= Cycling at the 2012 Summer Olympics – Men's road time trial =

Men's road time trial at the Games of the XXX Olympiad
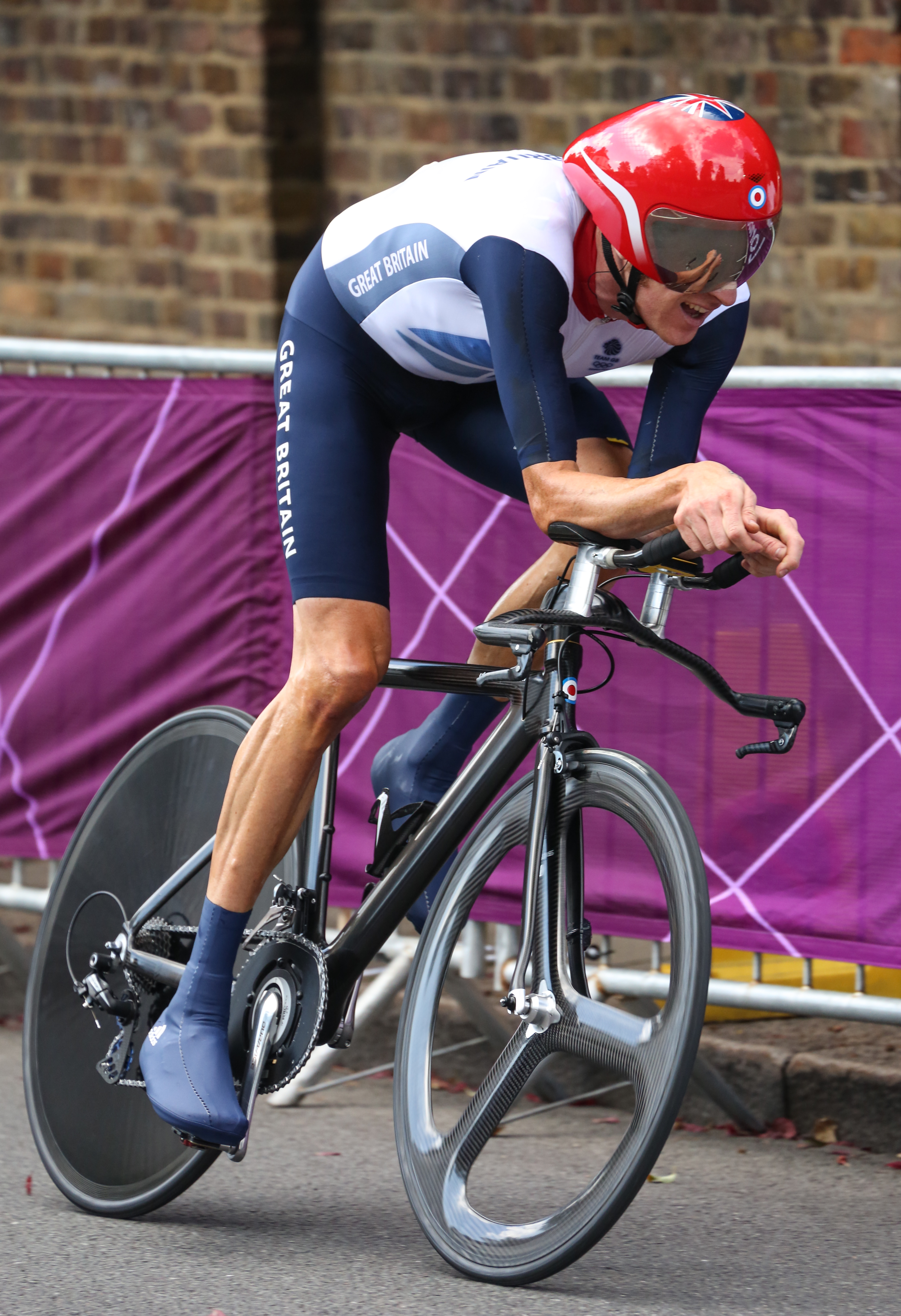
- Winner Bradley Wiggins as he approached Bushy Park, 2 km from the finish line.
- Venue: London and Surrey
- Date: 1 August
- Competitors: 37 from 30 nations
- Winning time: 50:39.54

Medalists
1st place, gold medalist(s)		Bradley Wiggins	Great Britain
2nd place, silver medalist(s)		Tony Martin	Germany
3rd place, bronze medalist(s)		Chris Froome	Great Britain

The men's road time trial, one of the cycling events at the 2012 Olympic Games in London, took place on 1 August over a 44 km (27.3 mi) course in southwest London and Surrey.

Bradley Wiggins of Great Britain won the gold medal.

== Qualification ==
Each nation in the top 15 of the 2011 UCI World Tour, top 7 of the UCI Europe Tour, top 4 of the UCI America Tour, top 2 of the UCI Asia Tour and leaders of the UCI Oceania and Africa Tours qualified to have one rider in the race. In addition, ten nations gained an extra rider through the performance of their riders in the 2011 UCI World Time Trial Championships; these were Germany, Great Britain, Switzerland, Australia, Netherlands, Kazakhstan, Denmark, Spain, Sweden and Canada. The United States were given an extra rider at the expense of Luxembourg, who were not represented in the race.

== Pre-race favourites ==
The defending champion in this discipline was Fabian Cancellara of Switzerland. He was expected to mount a strong challenge, but crashed heavily in the closing stages of the Olympic road race, initially putting his participation in the time trial in doubt. Scans revealed that he had avoided breaking his collarbone for the second time in the season, though, and he started in the time trial.

Bradley Wiggins of Great Britain was also considered a big favourite, having won seven previous time trials in the 2012 season.. Current world champion Tony Martin of Germany was tipped as an early favourite, but had suffered an injury-wrecked season, and pulled out of the Tour de France in an effort to be fit for the Olympic race.

Of the other contenders, Great Britain's Chris Froome had shown strong form at the Tour de France, where he finished second in two time trials. Michael Rogers, the 2003–2005 time trial world champion represented Australia, with 2011 Tour de France winner Cadel Evans electing not to start due to fatigue. Young American Taylor Phinney, who won the opening time trial of the 2012 Giro D'Italia represented the United States. Sylvain Chavanel was the sole French rider, along with Luis León Sánchez of Spain and Marco Pinotti, winner of a time trial in the Giro, who represented Italy.

== Course ==
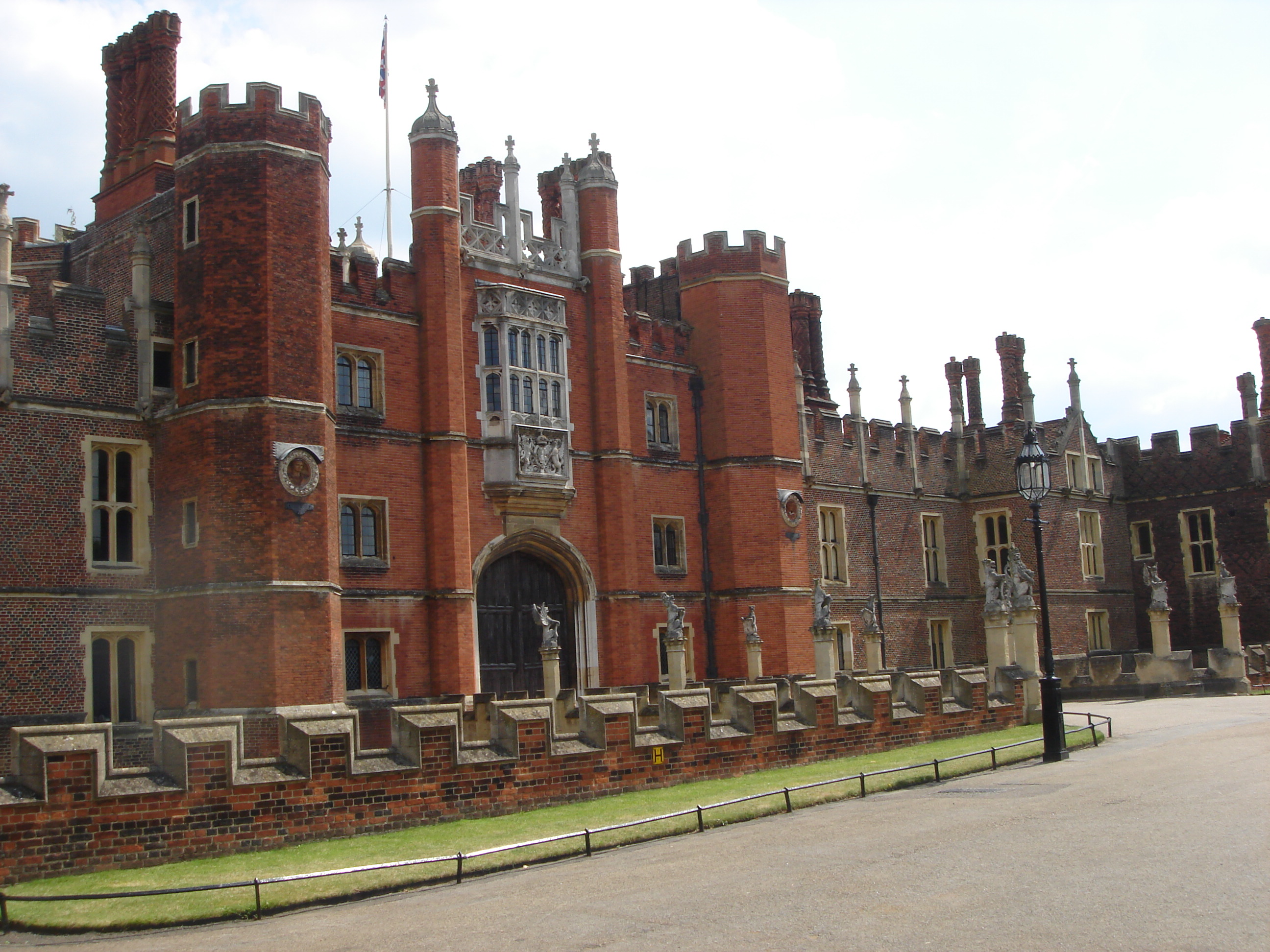
Hampton Court Palace hosted the start and finish of the time trial.

The competition consisted of a time trial over one lap of a 44 km (27.3 mi) course, with staggered starts. Starting and finishing at the historic Hampton Court Palace, the course passed through areas of southwest London and Surrey including Esher, Kingston upon Thames, Teddington and Bushy Park.

== Schedule ==
Date	Time	Round
Wednesday 1 August 2012	14:15 (BST)	Final

== Results ==
The entry list was published on 1 August.

Rank	Rider	Country	Time
1st place, gold medalist(s)	Bradley Wiggins	Great Britain	50:39.54
2nd place, silver medalist(s)	Tony Martin	Germany	51:21.54
3rd place, bronze medalist(s)	Chris Froome	Great Britain	51:47.87
4	Taylor Phinney	United States	52:38.07
5	Marco Pinotti	Italy	52:49.28
6	Michael Rogers	Australia	52:51.39
7	Fabian Cancellara	Switzerland	52:53.71
8	Bert Grabsch	Germany	53:18.04
9	Jonathan Castroviejo	Spain	53:29.36
10	Janez Brajkovič	Slovenia	54:09.72
11	Lieuwe Westra	Netherlands	54:19.62
12	Vasil Kiryienka	Belarus	54:30.29
13	Edvald Boasson Hagen	Norway	54:30.87
14	Lars Bak	Denmark	54:33.21
15	Jakob Fuglsang	Denmark	54:34.49
16	Gustav Larsson	Sweden	54:35.26
17	Philippe Gilbert	Belgium	54:39.98
18	Nelson Oliveira	Portugal	54:41.57
19	Jack Bauer	New Zealand	54:54.16
20	Denis Menchov	Russia	54:59.26
21	Ramūnas Navardauskas	Lithuania	55:12.32
22	Lars Boom	Netherlands	55:29.74
23	Alexander Vinokourov	Kazakhstan	55:37.05
24	Fumiyuki Beppu	Japan	55:40.64
25	Maciej Bodnar	Poland	55:49.67
26	Magno Nazaret	Brazil	55:50.77
27	David McCann	Ireland	56:03.77
28	Ryder Hesjedal	Canada	56:06.18
29	Sylvain Chavanel	France	56:07.67
30	Michael Albasini	Switzerland	56:38.38
31	Assan Bazayev	Kazakhstan	56:40.77
32	Luis León Sánchez	Spain	56:59.16
33	Tomás Gil	Venezuela	57:05.12
34	Mouhcine Lahsaini	Morocco	57:25.24
35	Fabio Duarte	Colombia	57:34.20
36	Alireza Haghi	Iran	57:41.44
37	Ahmet Akdilek	Turkey	59:11.19
