= 2011 UCI Road World Championships – Men's time trial =

Men's time trial
2011 UCI Road World Championships
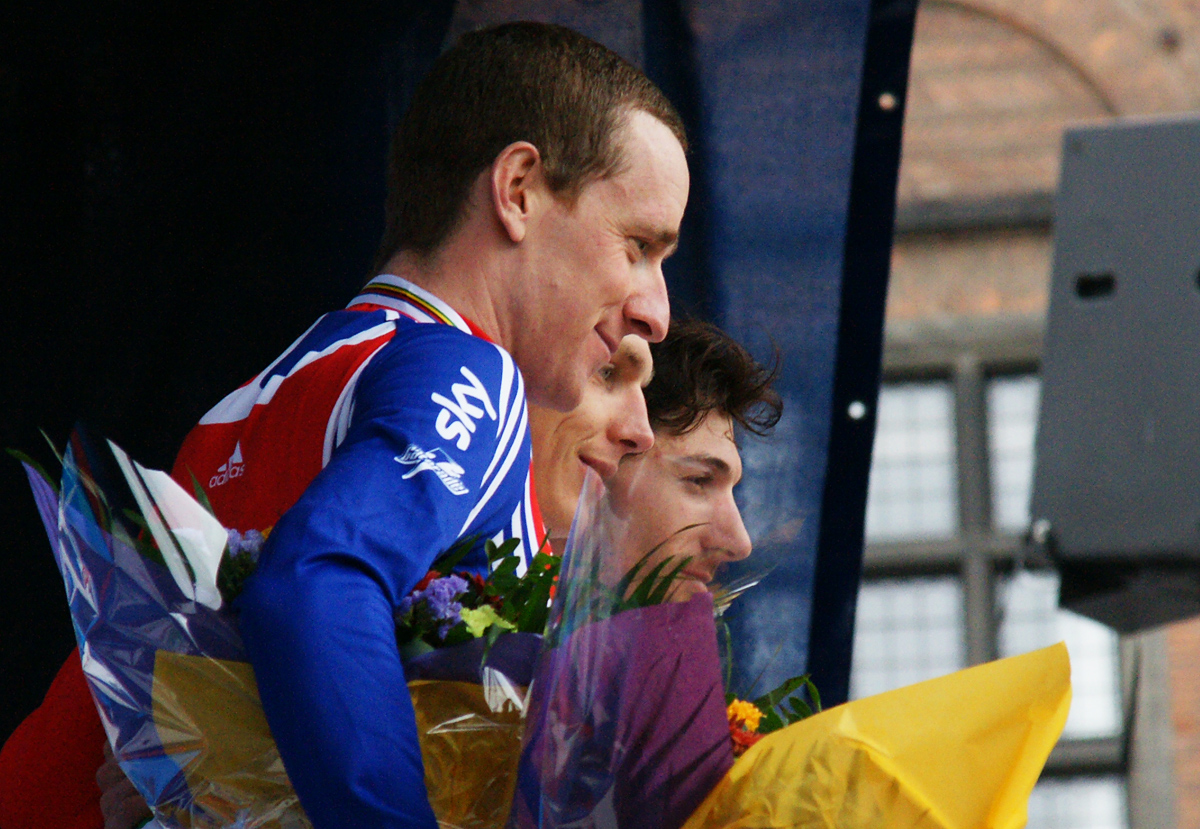
- The podium (left to right): Bradley Wiggins, Tony Martin and Fabian Cancellara

Race details
- Dates: 21 September 2011
- Stages: 1
- Distance: 46.4 km (28.83 mi)
- Winning time: 53' 43.85"

Medalists
	Gold	Tony Martin (Germany)
	Silver	Bradley Wiggins (Great Britain)
	Bronze	Fabian Cancellara (Switzerland)

The men's time trial of the 2011 UCI Road World Championships cycling event took place on 21 September 2011 in Copenhagen, Denmark.

After bronze medals in both 2009 and 2010, Tony Martin won his first world championship title after setting the quickest time at each of the intermediate splits, before crossing the line in a time over a minute faster than anyone else. He caught and passed the two riders who started directly before him, David Millar and Mikhail Ignatiev, and came within 45 seconds of catching a third (Taylor Phinney). The silver medal went to Great Britain's Bradley Wiggins, with the bronze medal going to four-time world champion Fabian Cancellara, who trailed Wiggins by 4.76 seconds after making an error in the closing stages.

== Route ==
The riders completed two laps on a 23.2 km (14.4 mi) course in and around Copenhagen, for a total length of 46.4 km (28.8 mi).

== Final classification ==
Rank	Rider	Time
1	(Germany) Tony Martin (GER)	53' 43.85"
2	(United Kingdom) Bradley Wiggins (GBR)	+ 1' 15.83"
3	(Switzerland) Fabian Cancellara (SUI)	+ 1' 20.59"
4	(Germany) Bert Grabsch (GER)	+ 1' 31.76"
5	(Australia) Jack Bobridge (AUS)	+ 2' 13.86"
6	(Australia) Richie Porte (AUS)	+ 2' 29.54"
7	(United Kingdom) David Millar (GBR)	+ 2' 45.62"
8	(Netherlands) Lieuwe Westra (NED)	+ 3' 18.52"
9	(Kazakhstan) Alexsandr Dyachenko (KAZ)	+ 3' 19.76"
10	(Denmark) Jakob Fuglsang (DEN)	+ 3' 30.59"
11	(Spain) Jonathan Castroviejo (ESP)	+ 3' 34.37"
12	(Sweden) Gustav Larsson (SWE)	+ 3' 34.62"
13	(Canada) Svein Tuft (CAN)	+ 3' 35.89"
14	(Slovenia) Janez Brajkovič (SLO)	+ 3' 44.74"
15	(United States) Taylor Phinney (USA)	+ 3' 52.58"
16	(United States) Andrew Talansky (USA)	+ 3' 57.89"
17	(Portugal) Nelson Oliveira (POR)	+ 4' 14.98"
18	(New Zealand) Jesse Sergent (NZL)	+ 4' 26.31"
19	(New Zealand) Jack Bauer (NZL)	+ 4' 26.99"
20	(Netherlands) Stef Clement (NED)	+ 4' 33.93"
21	(Czech Republic) František Raboň (CZE)	+ 4' 39.85"
22	(France) László Bodrogi (FRA)	+ 4' 41.46"
23	(Belarus) Vasil Kiryienka (BLR)	+ 4' 42.60"
24	(Italy) Adriano Malori (ITA)	+ 4' 46.58"
25	(Russia) Mikhail Ignatiev (RUS)	+ 4' 47.97"
26	(Italy) Marco Pinotti (ITA)	+ 4' 48.12"
27	(Republic of Ireland) David McCann (IRL)	+ 4' 53.65"
28	(Lithuania) Ignatas Konovalovas (LTU)	+ 5' 00.51"
29	(Belgium) Dominique Cornu (BEL)	+ 5' 01.36"
30	(Greece) Ioannis Tamouridis (GRE)	+ 5' 07.74"
31	(Kyrgyzstan) Evgeny Vakker (KGZ)	+ 5' 10.46"
32	(Lithuania) Gediminas Bagdonas (LTU)	+ 5' 10.46"
33	(Colombia) Iván Casas (COL)	+ 5' 20.23"
34	(Chile) Carlos Oyarzún (CHI)	+ 5' 22.32"
35	(Argentina) Leandro Messineo (ARG)	+ 5' 23.67"
36	(Kazakhstan) Dmitriy Gruzdev (KAZ)	+ 5' 29.90"
37	(Sweden) Alexander Wetterhall (SWE)	+ 5' 35.10"
38	(Slovakia) Matej Jurčo (SVK)	+ 5' 37.35"
39	(Spain) Jesús Herrada (ESP)	+ 5' 39.30"
40	(Switzerland) Martin Kohler (SUI)	+ 5' 43.24"
41	(Russia) Vladimir Gusev (RUS)	+ 5' 49.99"
42	(France) Dimitri Champion (FRA)	+ 5' 50.82"
43	(Norway) Reidar Borgersen (NOR)	+ 5' 54.83"
44	(Argentina) Matías Médici (ARG)	+ 5' 56.21"
45	(Slovenia) Robert Vrečer (SLO)	+ 6' 04.21"
46	(Tunisia) Rafaâ Chtioui (TUN)	+ 6' 10.00"
47	(Denmark) Michael Mørkøv (DEN)	+ 6' 10.16"
48	(Poland) Michał Kwiatkowski (POL)	+ 6' 13.80"
49	(Portugal) Rui Costa (POR)	+ 6' 17.44"
50	(Belgium) Thomas De Gendt (BEL)	+ 6' 28.46"
51	(Colombia) Winner Anacona (COL)	+ 6' 29.04"
52	(Ukraine) Oleksandr Kvachuk (UKR)	+ 6' 30.37"
53	(Finland) Matti Helminen (FIN)	+ 6' 43.78"
54	(Venezuela) Tomás Gil (VEN)	+ 6' 52.81"
55	(Poland) Maciej Bodnar (POL)	+ 6 '55.36"
56	(Ukraine) Vitaliy Popkov (UKR)	+ 7' 06.49"
57	(Czech Republic) Jiří Hudeček (CZE)	+ 7' 27.50"
58	(Slovakia) Pavol Polievka (SVK)	+ 7' 40.16"
59	(Eritrea) Ferekalsi Debesay (ERI)	+ 8' 12.76"
60	(Andorra) David Albós (AND)	+ 9' 38.90"
61	(Albania) Tyron Giorgieri (ALB)	+ 11' 18.93"
62	(Albania) Simone Zignoli (ALB)	+ 17' 43.22"
	(Republic of Ireland) Matt Brammeier (IRL)	DNF
	(Eritrea) Semere Mengis (ERI)	DSQ
	(Algeria) Azzedine Lagab (ALG)	DNS
