= 2012 UCI Road World Championships – Men's time trial =

Men's time trial
2012 UCI Road World Championships
- Rainbow jersey

Race details
- Dates: 19 September 2012
- Stages: 1
- Distance: 46.2 km (28.71 mi)
- Winning time: 58' 38.76"

Medalists
	Gold	Tony Martin (Germany)
	Silver	Taylor Phinney (United States)
	Bronze	Vasil Kiryienka (Belarus)

The Men's time trial of the 2012 UCI Road World Championships cycling event took place on 19 September 2012 in Limburg, Netherlands.

Tony Martin defended his title by one of the smallest margins in the history of the event. On his ride he caught up and overtook Alberto Contador who started two minutes ahead.

== Route ==
The riders completed a course that was 46.2 km (28.7 mi) starting from Heerlen and finishing in Valkenburg. There were three named climbs including the famous Cauberg that features in the Amstel Gold Race.

== Final classification ==
Rank	Rider	Time
1	(Germany) Tony Martin (GER)	58' 38.76"
2	(United States) Taylor Phinney (USA)	+ 5.37"
3	(Belarus) Vasil Kiryienka (BLR)	+ 1' 44.99"
4	(United States) Tejay van Garderen (USA)	+ 1' 49.37"
5	(Sweden) Fredrik Kessiakoff (SWE)	+ 1' 50.56"
6	(Kazakhstan) Dmitriy Gruzdev (KAZ)	+ 1' 56.44"
7	(Czech Republic) Jan Bárta (CZE)	+ 2' 12.49"
8	(United Kingdom) Alex Dowsett (GBR)	+ 2' 26.06"
9	(Spain) Alberto Contador (ESP)	+ 2' 30.00"
10	(Italy) Adriano Malori (ITA)	+ 2' 40.54"
11	(Ukraine) Andriy Hryvko (UKR)	+ 2' 43.69"
12	(Canada) Svein Tuft (CAN)	+ 2' 56.24"
13	(Estonia) Tanel Kangert (EST)	+ 2' 57.13"
14	(Austria) Riccardo Zoidl (AUT)	+ 2' 57.27"
15	(France) Sylvain Chavanel (FRA)	+ 2' 58.15"
16	(Australia) Cameron Meyer (AUS)	+ 2' 59.65"
17	(Slovenia) Kristijan Koren (SLO)	+ 3' 05.29"
18	(France) Jérémy Roy (FRA)	+ 3' 08.16"
19	(Sweden) Gustav Larsson (SWE)	+ 3' 11.99"
20	(Belgium) Thomas De Gendt (BEL)	+ 3' 15.29"
21	(Australia) Luke Durbridge (AUS)	+ 3' 17.88"
22	(Spain) Jonathan Castroviejo (ESP)	+ 3' 23.38"
23	(New Zealand) Jesse Sergent (NZL)	+ 3' 25.89"
24	(Belgium) Kristof Vandewalle (BEL)	+ 3' 35.66"
25	(Netherlands) Wilco Kelderman (NED)	+ 3' 39.35"
26	(Poland) Maciej Bodnar (POL)	+ 3' 46.06"
27	(Germany) Patrick Gretsch (GER)	+ 3' 48.78"
28	(Greece) Ioannis Tamouridis (GRE)	+ 3' 52.35"
29	(Russia) Sergey Firsanov (RUS)	+ 3' 56.58"
30	(Slovakia) Matej Jurčo (SVK)	+ 3' 56.96"
31	(New Zealand) Sam Bewley (NZL)	+ 3' 59.21"
32	(Chile) Carlos Oyarzun (CHI)	+ 4' 03.43"
33	(Lithuania) Ramūnas Navardauskas (LTU)	+ 4' 05.98"
34	(Slovakia) Peter Velits (SVK)	+ 4' 07.06"
35	(Estonia) Rein Taaramäe (EST)	+ 4' 09.84"
36	(Germany) Bert Grabsch (GER)	+ 4' 16.85"
37	(Denmark) Jakob Fuglsang (DEN)	+ 4' 18.37"
38	(Netherlands) Lieuwe Westra (NED)	+ 4' 18.79"
39	(South Africa) Jay Thomson (RSA)	+ 4' 19.25"
40	(Slovenia) Janez Brajkovič (SLO)	+ 4' 19.82"
41	(South Africa) Reinardt Janse van Rensburg (RSA)	+ 4' 25.93"
42	(Kazakhstan) Alexsandr Dyachenko (KAZ)	+ 4' 32.23"
43	(Latvia) Gatis Smukulis (LAT)	+ 4' 35.63"
44	(Lithuania) Ignatas Konovalovas (LTU)	+ 4' 54.59"
45	(Ukraine) Mykhaylo Kononenko (UKR)	+ 5' 09.20"
46	(Republic of Ireland) Michael Hutchinson (IRL)	+ 5' 22.86"
47	(Russia) Vladimir Gusev (RUS)	+ 5' 34.37"
48	(Kyrgyzstan) Evgeny Vakker (KGZ)	+ 5' 43.45"
49	(Ecuador) José Ragonessi (ECU)	+ 6' 16.66"
50	(Latvia) Aleksejs Saramotins (LAT)	+ 6' 19.04"
51	(Ecuador) Segundo Navarrete (ECU)	+ 7' 58.00"
52	(Azerbaijan) Elchin Asadov (AZE)	+ 9' 12.93"
53	(Belarus) Andrei Krasilnikau (BLR)	+ 9' 17.91"
54	(Andorra) David Albós (AND)	+ 9' 18.85"
55	(South Korea) Jiyong Kang (KOR)	+ 9' 19.66"
56	(Hungary) Gábor Lengyel (HUN)	+ 13' 49.29"
	(Norway) Reidar Borgersen (NOR)	DNF
	(Italy) Marco Pinotti (ITA)	DNF
