= 2009 national road cycling championships =

The 2009 national road cycling championships began in January in Australia and New Zealand. Most of the European national championships took place in June.

== Jerseys ==
The winner of each national championship wears the national jersey in all their races for the next year in the respective discipline, apart from the World Championships, or unless they are wearing a category leader's jersey in a stage race. The jerseys tend to represent the countries' flag or use the colours from it.

== 2009 Champions ==
With eight national champions, Team Columbia-HTC (1 road race champion and 7 time trial champions) had the most national champions in 2009.

=== Men's Elite ===
Country	Men's Elite Road Race Champion	Champion's Current Team	Men's Elite Time Trial Champion	Champion's Current Team
Albania	Eugert Zhupa		Eugert Zhupa	
Andorra			David Albós	Agrupació Ciclista Andorrana
Argentina	Facundo Bazzi		Juan Curuchet	
Antigua and Barbuda	Godfrey Pollydore		Robert Marsh	
Australia	Peter McDonald	Drapac–Porsche	Michael Rogers	Team Columbia–High Road
Austria	Markus Eibegger	Elk Haus	Matthias Brändle	Elk Haus
Bahamas	Lee Farmer		Mark Holowesko	
Belarus	Yauheni Hutarovich	Française des Jeux	Branislau Samoilau	Quick-Step
Belgium	Tom Boonen	Quick-Step	Maxime Monfort	Team Columbia–HTC
Belize	Marlon Castillo		Ernest Meighan	Belize Cycling
Bermuda	Scott Williams		Garth Thomson	
Bolivia	Arnold Zapata		Arnold Zapata	
Brazil	Flávio Cardoso		Rodrigo Nascimento	
British Virgin Islands	Aurélien Moyon (France)		Andrews Orano (Saint Vincent and the Grenadines)	
Bulgaria	Ivaïlo Gabrovski	Heraklion-Nessebar	Pavel Shumanov	
Burkina Faso	Rabak Jérémie Ouedraogo			
Cameroon	Sadrak Teguimaha			
Canada	Guillaume Boivin		Svein Tuft	Garmin–Slipstream
Cayman Islands			Jerome Ameline	
Chile	José Aravena		Jorge Contreras	
China	Xu Gang	Max Success Sports	Li Fuyu	Trek-Marco Polo Cycling Team
Colombia	Oscar Álvarez	UNE-EPM	Santiago Botero	Indeportes Antioquia
Costa Rica	Henry Raabe		José Adrián Bonilla	
Ivory Coast	Issiaka Fofana	AS Cavel de Koumassi		
Croatia	Radoslav Rogina	Loborika	Bruno Radotič	BK Puris Kamen
Cyprus	Vassilis Adamou		Vassilis Adamou	
Czech Republic	Martin Mareš	PSK Whirlpool–Author	František Raboň	Team Columbia–HTC
Denmark	Matti Breschel	Team Saxo Bank	Lars Bak	Team Saxo Bank
Ecuador	cancelled		Roberto Quistial	
El Salvador	Reynaldo Murillo		Mario Contreras	
Estonia	Rein Taaramäe	Cofidis	Rein Taaramäe	Cofidis
France	Dimitri Champion	Bretagne–Schuller	Jean-Christophe Péraud	Creusot Cyclisme
Finland	Kjell Carlström	Liquigas	Jarmo Rissanen	Cycle Center
Germany	Martin Reimer	Cervélo TestTeam	Bert Grabsch	Team Columbia–HTC
Greece	Ioannis Drakakis		Ioannis Tamouridis	
Guatemala	Rolando Solomán		Rodrigo Castillo	
Guyana	Warren McKay			
Hungary	Istvan Cziraki	Betonexpressz 2000–Limonta	Rida Cador	Atlas–Romer's Hausbäckerei
Iceland	Pálmar Kristmundsson		Hafsteinn Geirsson	
Iran	Rahim Ememi		Mehdi Sohrabi	Tabriz Petrochemical Cycling Team
Ireland	Nicolas Roche	Ag2r–La Mondiale	David McCann	Ride Sport Racing
Israel	Avichai Greenberg		Eyal Rahat	
Italy	Filippo Pozzato	Team Katusha	Marco Pinotti	Team Columbia–HTC
Japan	Taiji Nishitani	Aisan Racing Team	Kazuhiro Mori	Aisan Racing Team
Kazakhstan	Dimitri Fofonov		Andrey Mizourov	Tabriz Petrochemical Cycling Team
Kyrgyzstan	Evgeny Vakker	Islamic Azad University	Evgeny Vakker	Islamic Azad University
Latvia	Oleg Melehs	Meridiana – Kalev Chocolate Team	Raivis Belohvoščiks	Betonexpressz 2000–Limonta
Lebanon	Zaher El Hage		Zaher El Hage	
Lithuania	Egidijus Juodvalkis	Team Piemonte	Ignatas Konovalovas	Cervélo TestTeam
Luxembourg	Andy Schleck	Team Saxo Bank	Kim Kirchen	Team Columbia–HTC
Mexico	Florencio Ramos	Chiapas Tequila Afamado	Ignacio Sarabia	Rock Racing
Mauritius	Yannick Lincoln		Yannick Lincoln	
Moldova	Oleg Berdos		Serghei Tvetcov	
Morocco	Adil Jelloul			
Namibia	Tjipee Murangi		Erik Hoffmann	
Netherlands	Koos Moerenhout	Rabobank	Stef Clement	Rabobank
North Korea	Ho Nam Ri		Chol Ryong Kim	
New Zealand	Gordon McCauley	Subway – Avanti Cycling Team	Jeremy Vennell	Bissell
Norway	Kurt Asle Arvesen	Team Saxo Bank	Edvald Boasson Hagen	Team Columbia–HTC
Panama	Fernando Ureña		Mohamed Méndez	
Poland	Krzysztof Jezowski	CCC–Polsat–Polkowice	Maciej Bodnar	Liquigas
Portugal	Manuel Cardoso	Liberty Seguros	Tiago Machado	Madeinox–Boavista
Romania	Sorin Gabriel Pop	C.S. Mazicon București	Sorin Gabriel Pop	C.S. Mazicon București
Russia	Sergei Ivanov	Team Katusha	Artem Ovechkin	Lokomotiv
Serbia	Ivan Stević		Zolt Der	
Slovakia	Martin Velits	Team Milram	Roman Bronis	CK Windoor's Pribram
Slovenia	Mitja Mahoric	Adria Mobil	Janez Brajkovič	Astana
South Africa	Jamie Ball	House of Paint	David George	Barloworld
Spain	Rubén Plaza	Liberty Seguros	Alberto Contador	Astana
Sweden	Marcus Ljungqvist	Team Saxo Bank	Alexander Wetterhall	
Switzerland	Fabian Cancellara	Team Saxo Bank	Rubens Bertogliati	Diquigiovanni–Androni
Tunisia			Aymen Ben Hassine	
Turkey	Miraç Kal	Torku Şekerspor	Muhammet Eyüp Karagöbek	Brisaspor
Ukraine	Volodymyr Starchyk	Amore & Vita–McDonald's	Andriy Hrivko	ISD
United Kingdom	Kristian House	Rapha Condor	Bradley Wiggins	Garmin–Slipstream
Uruguay	Néstor Aquino	Club Ciclista Fénix	Daniel Fuentes	Olimpico Juvenil De Flores
United Arab Emirates	Mohamed Al Marwi		Badr Banihammad	
United States	George Hincapie	Team Columbia–HTC	David Zabriskie	Garmin–Slipstream
United States Virgin Islands	Robert Bumann			
Uzbekistan	Sergey Lagutin	Vacansoleil	Vladimir Tuychiev	
Venezuela	Honorio Machado	Betonexpressz 2000–Limonta	José Rujano	Gobernación del Zulia
Zimbabwe	Conway Mohamed		Dave Martin	

=== Women's ===
Country	Women's Road Race Champion	Women's Time Trial Champion
Argentina	Carla Álvarez	Valeria Müller
Antigua and Barbuda	Tamiko Butler	
Australia	Carla Ryan	Carla Ryan
Austria	Christiane Soeder	Christiane Soeder
Belarus	Tatsiana Sharakova	Tatsiana Sharakova
Belgium	Ludivine Henrion	Liesbet De Vocht
Bolivia		
Brazil		
Canada		
Chile		
China		
Colombia		
Costa Rica		Rebeca Gonzalez
Croatia		
Cyprus		
Czech Republic		Tereza Huríková
Denmark	Linda Villumsen	Linda Villumsen
Ecuador		
Estonia		
France		Jeannie Longo
Finland	Carina Ketonen	Heljä Korhonen
Germany		
Hungary	Monika Király	
Iran		
Ireland	Heather Wilson	Olivia Dillon
Israel	Leah Goldstein	Leah Goldstein
Italy	Monia Baccaille	Noemi Cantele
Japan	Kanako Nishi	Mayuko Hagiwara
Kazakhstan		
Latvia		
Lebanon		
Lithuania	Rasa Leleivytė	Diana Žiliūtė
Luxembourg		
Moldova		
Netherlands	Marianne Vos	Regina Bruins
New Zealand	Melissa Holt	Melissa Holt
Norway		Gunn Hilleren
Poland	Bogumiła Matusiak	
Portugal		
Russia	Yulia Ilinykh	Tatyana Antoshina
Serbia	Jovana Krtinic	Jovana Krtinic
Slovakia		
Slovenia		
South Africa	Lynette Burger	Cashandra Slingerland
Spain		
Sweden	Jennie Stenerhag	Emilia Fahlin
Switzerland		Karin Thürig
Turkey	Esra Kürkçü	Merve Tayfun Marmara
Ukraine		
United Kingdom	Nicole Cooke	Emma Pooley
United States	Meredith Miller	
Uzbekistan		
Venezuela		

=== Men's Under-23 ===
Country	Men's Under-23 Road Race Champion	Men's Under-23 Time Trial Champion
Argentina	Román Mastrángelo	Román Mastrángelo
Antigua and Barbuda		
Australia	Jack Bobridge	Jack Bobridge
Austria		
Belarus		
Belgium		
Bolivia		
Brazil		
Canada	Guillaume Boivin	David Veilleux
Chile		
China		
Colombia		
Costa Rica		
Croatia		
Cyprus		
Czech Republic		
Denmark	Rasmus Guldhammer	
Ecuador		
Estonia		
France		
Finland	Paavo Paajanen	Teemu Viholainen
Germany		
Hungary	Vígh Zoltán	Fejes Gábor
Iran		
Ireland	Seán Downey	Aaron Buggle
Israel		
Italy	Andrea Zontan	Alfredo Balloni
Japan	Eiichi Hirai	Yoshiaki Shimada
Kazakhstan		
Latvia		
Lebanon		
Lithuania		
Luxembourg		
Moldova		
Netherlands	Steven Kruijswijk	Dennis van Winden
New Zealand	James Williamson	Michael Torckler
Norway	Alexander Kristoff	Alexander Randin
Poland		
Portugal		Nelson Oliveira
Romania	Andrei Nechita	Zoltan Sipos
Russia	Andrei Solomennikov	Timofey Kritskiy
Slovakia		
Slovenia		
South Africa	Christopher Jennings	Jaco Venter
Spain		
Sweden		Tobias Ludvigsson
Switzerland		Nicolas Schnyder
Turkey	Ali Osman Usta	Rasim Reis
Ukraine		
United Kingdom	Peter Kennaugh	Alex Dowsett
United States	Alex Howes	
Uzbekistan		
Venezuela		
