= 2010 Eneco Tour =

2010 UCI World Ranking, race 21 of 26
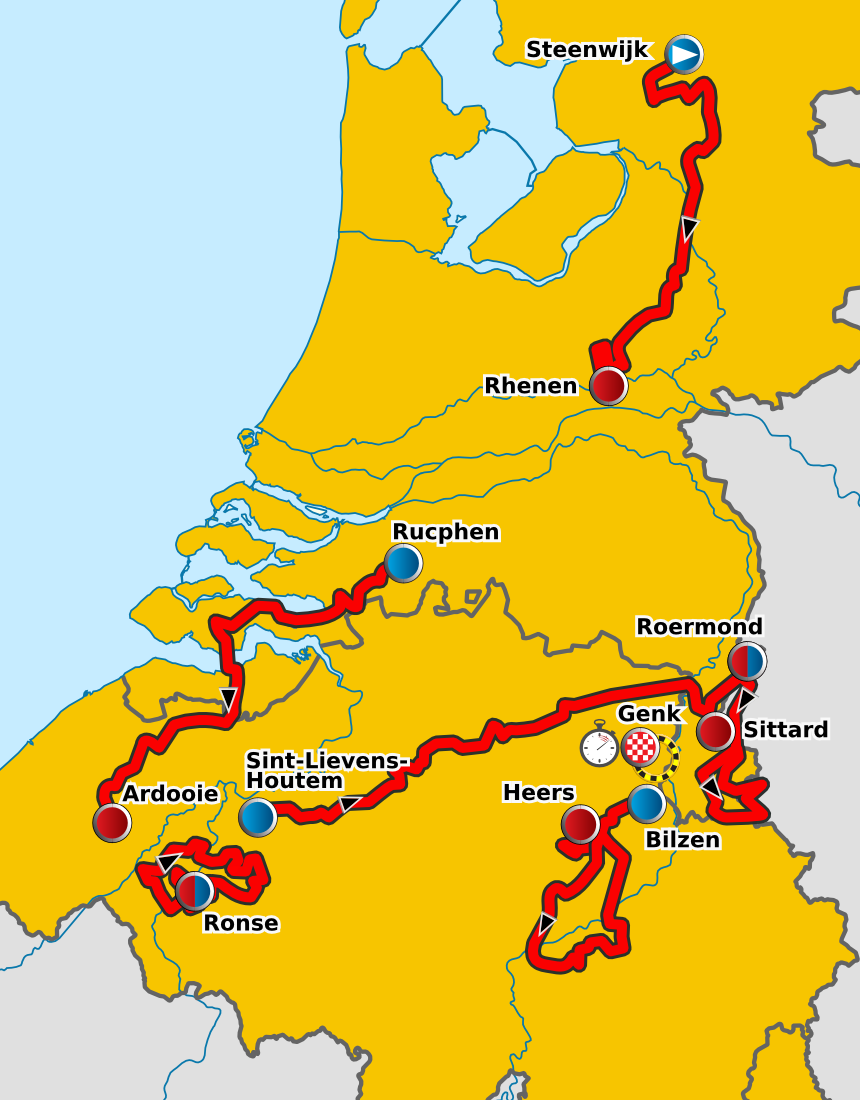

Race details
- Dates: 17—24 August 2010
- Stages: 7+Prologue
- Distance: 1,214.4 km (754.6 mi)
- Winning time: 28h 50' 57"

Results
Jersey awarded to the overall winner	Winner	Tony Martin (GER)	(Team HTC–Columbia)
	Second	Koos Moerenhout (NED)	(Rabobank)
	Third	Edvald Boasson Hagen (NOR)	(Team Sky)

The 2010 Eneco Tour was the sixth edition of the Eneco Tour cycling stage race. It took place from 17 August to 24 August 2010 in the Benelux. Like the previous years, parts of the Netherlands and Belgium were covered. It was part of the UCI World Ranking. It began with a short individual time trial in Steenwijk and ended with a longer one in Genk.

== Schedule ==
Stage	Route	Distance	Date	Winner
P	Steenwijk (Netherlands) > Steenwijk (Netherlands)	5.2 km	Tuesday, August 17	(Canada) Svein Tuft
1	Steenwijk (Netherlands) > Rhenen (Netherlands)	178 km	Wednesday, August 18	(Australia) Robbie McEwen
2	Rucphen (Netherlands) > Ardooie (Belgium)	198.5 km	Thursday, August 19	(Germany) André Greipel
3	Ronse (Belgium) > Ronse (Belgium)	191.8 km	Friday, August 20	(Netherlands) Koos Moerenhout
4	Sint-Lievens-Houtem (Belgium) > Roermond (Netherlands)	214.4 km	Saturday, August 21	(New Zealand) Greg Henderson
5	Roermond (Netherlands) > Sittard (Netherlands)	204 km	Sunday, August 22	(Australia) Jack Bobridge
6	Bilzen (Belgium) > Heers (Belgium)	205.6 km	Monday, August 23	(Germany) André Greipel
7 (ITT)	Genk (Belgium) > Genk (Belgium)	16.9 km	Tuesday, August 24	(Germany) Tony Martin

== Teams ==
Twenty-one teams have been invited to the 2010 Eneco Tour of which 18 teams are from the UCI Pro Tour

- Ag2r–La Mondiale
- Astana
- Caisse d'Epargne
- Euskaltel–Euskadi
- Footon–Servetto–Fuji
- Française des Jeux
- Garmin–Transitions
- Lampre–Farnese
- Liquigas–Doimo
- Omega Pharma–Lotto
- Quick-Step
- Rabobank
- Team Sky
- Team HTC–Columbia
- Team Katusha
- Team Milram
- Team RadioShack
- Team Saxo Bank

3 teams were awarded a wildcard invitation:

- Vacansoleil
- Topsport Vlaanderen–Mercator
- Skil–Shimano

== Stages ==
=== Prologue ===
17 August 2010 – Steenwijk (Netherlands), 5.2 km (3.2 mi)

Prologue Result and General Classification after Prologue

	Rider	Team	Time
1	Svein Tuft (CAN)	Garmin–Transitions	6' 18"
2	Jos van Emden (NED)	Rabobank	+ 5"
3	Lars Boom (NED)	Rabobank	+ 6"
4	Maarten Tjallingii (NED)	Rabobank	+ 6"
5	Edvald Boasson Hagen (NOR)	Team Sky	+ 7"
6	Geraint Thomas (GBR)	Team Sky	+ 7"
7	Tony Martin (GER)	Team HTC–Columbia	+ 7"
8	Alex Rasmussen (DEN)	Team Saxo Bank	+ 9"
9	Richie Porte (AUS)	Team Saxo Bank	+ 9"
10	Jonathan Castroviejo (ESP)	Euskaltel–Euskadi	+ 10"

=== Stage 1 ===
18 August 2010 – Steenwijk (Netherlands) to Rhenen (Netherlands), 178 km (110.6 mi)

Stage 1 Result

	Rider	Team	Time
1	Robbie McEwen (AUS)	Team Katusha	4h 16' 34"
2	Lucas Sebastián Haedo (ARG)	Team Saxo Bank	s.t.
3	Allan Davis (AUS)	Astana	s.t.
4	Francesco Chicchi (ITA)	Liquigas–Doimo	s.t.
5	Jürgen Roelandts (BEL)	Omega Pharma–Lotto	s.t.
6	Lieuwe Westra (NED)	Vacansoleil	s.t.
7	Yauheni Hutarovich (BLR)	FDJ	s.t.
8	Iván Gutiérrez (ESP)	Caisse d'Epargne	s.t.
9	Christian Knees (GER)	Team Milram	s.t.
10	Maxime Vantomme (BEL)	Team Katusha	s.t.

General Classification after Stage 1

	Rider	Team	Time
1	Svein Tuft (CAN)	Garmin–Transitions	4h 22' 52"
2	Jos van Emden (NED)	Rabobank	+ 5"
3	Lars Boom (NED)	Rabobank	+ 6"
4	Maarten Tjallingii (NED)	Rabobank	+ 6"
5	Edvald Boasson Hagen (NOR)	Team Sky	+ 7"
6	Tony Martin (GER)	Team HTC–Columbia	+ 7"
7	Richie Porte (AUS)	Team Saxo Bank	+ 9"
8	Christian Knees (GER)	Team Milram	+ 11"
9	Patrick Gretsch (GER)	Team HTC–Columbia	+ 12"
10	Greg Henderson (NZL)	Team Sky	+ 12"

=== Stage 2 ===
19 August 2010 – Sint Willebrord (Netherlands) to Ardooie (Belgium), 198.5 km (123.3 mi)

Stage 2 Result

	Rider	Team	Time
1	André Greipel (GER)	Team HTC–Columbia	4h 46' 50"
2	Robbie McEwen (AUS)	Team Katusha	s.t.
3	Edvald Boasson Hagen (NOR)	Team Sky	s.t.
4	Lucas Sebastián Haedo (ARG)	Team Saxo Bank	s.t.
5	Yauheni Hutarovich (BLR)	FDJ	s.t.
6	Enrique Mata (ESP)	Footon–Servetto–Fuji	s.t.
7	Wouter Weylandt (BEL)	Quick-Step	s.t.
8	Francesco Chicchi (ITA)	Liquigas–Doimo	s.t.
9	Allan Davis (AUS)	Astana	s.t.
10	Kenny Dehaes (BEL)	Omega Pharma–Lotto	s.t.

General Classification after Stage 2

	Rider	Team	Time
1	Svein Tuft (CAN)	Garmin–Transitions	9h 09' 42"
2	Edvald Boasson Hagen (NOR)	Team Sky	+ 3"
3	André Greipel (GER)	Team HTC–Columbia	+ 4"
4	Jos van Emden (NED)	Rabobank	+ 5"
5	Lars Boom (NED)	Rabobank	+ 6"
6	Maarten Tjallingii (NED)	Rabobank	+ 6"
7	Tony Martin (GER)	Team HTC–Columbia	+ 7"
8	Richie Porte (AUS)	Team Saxo Bank	+ 9"
9	Christian Knees (GER)	Team Milram	+ 11"
10	Patrick Gretsch (GER)	Team HTC–Columbia	+ 12"

=== Stage 3 ===
20 August 2010 – Ronse (Belgium), 191.8 km (119.2 mi)

Stage 3 Result

	Rider	Team	Time
1	Koos Moerenhout (NED)	Rabobank	4h 35' 51"
2	Tony Martin (GER)	Team HTC–Columbia	s.t.
3	Allan Davis (AUS)	Astana	+ 1' 24"
4	Edvald Boasson Hagen (NOR)	Team Sky	+ 1' 24"
5	Jürgen Roelandts (BEL)	Omega Pharma–Lotto	+ 1' 24"
6	Sep Vanmarcke (BEL)	Topsport Vlaanderen–Mercator	+ 1' 24"
7	Gorka Izaguirre (ESP)	Euskaltel–Euskadi	+ 1' 24"
8	Iván Gutiérrez (ESP)	Caisse d'Epargne	+ 1' 24"
9	Sergey Lagutin (UZB)	Vacansoleil	+ 1' 24"
10	Stijn Vandenbergh (BEL)	Team Katusha	+ 1' 24"

General Classification after Stage 3

	Rider	Team	Time
1	Tony Martin (GER)	Team HTC–Columbia	13h 45' 31"
2	Koos Moerenhout (NED)	Rabobank	+ 10"
3	Svein Tuft (CAN)	Garmin–Transitions	+ 1' 26"
4	Edvald Boasson Hagen (NOR)	Team Sky	+ 1' 28"
5	Lars Boom (NED)	Rabobank	+ 1' 32"
6	Richie Porte (AUS)	Team Saxo Bank	+ 1' 35"
7	Christian Knees (GER)	Team Milram	+ 1' 37"
8	Iván Gutiérrez (ESP)	Caisse d'Epargne	+ 1' 39"
9	Dominique Cornu (BEL)	Skil–Shimano	+ 1' 39"
10	Jürgen Roelandts (BEL)	Omega Pharma–Lotto	+ 1' 42"

=== Stage 4 ===
21 August 2010 – Sint-Lievens-Houtem (Belgium) to Roermond (Netherlands), 214.4 km (133.2 mi)

Stage 4 Result

	Rider	Team	Time
1	Greg Henderson (NZL)	Team Sky	4h 46' 46"
2	Kenny van Hummel (NED)	Skil–Shimano	s.t.
3	Edvald Boasson Hagen (NOR)	Team Sky	s.t.
4	Alex Rasmussen (DEN)	Team Saxo Bank	s.t.
5	Robbie McEwen (AUS)	Team Katusha	s.t.
6	Jürgen Roelandts (BEL)	Omega Pharma–Lotto	s.t.
7	Gert Steegmans (BEL)	Team RadioShack	s.t.
8	Elia Viviani (ITA)	Liquigas–Doimo	s.t.
9	Michael Van Staeyen (BEL)	Topsport Vlaanderen–Mercator	s.t.
10	Allan Davis (AUS)	Astana	s.t.

General Classification after Stage 4

	Rider	Team	Time
1	Tony Martin (GER)	Team HTC–Columbia	18h 32' 17"
2	Koos Moerenhout (NED)	Rabobank	+ 10"
3	Edvald Boasson Hagen (NOR)	Team Sky	+ 1' 24"
4	Svein Tuft (CAN)	Garmin–Transitions	+ 1' 26"
5	Lars Boom (NED)	Rabobank	+ 1' 32"
6	Richie Porte (AUS)	Team Saxo Bank	+ 1' 35"
7	Dominique Cornu (BEL)	Skil–Shimano	+ 1' 39"
8	Jürgen Roelandts (BEL)	Omega Pharma–Lotto	+ 1' 42"
9	Andreas Klöden (GER)	Team RadioShack	+ 1' 43"
10	Daniel Oss (ITA)	Liquigas–Doimo	+ 1' 43"

=== Stage 5 ===
22 August 2010 – Roermond (Netherlands) to Sittard (Netherlands), 204 km (126.8 mi)

Stage 5 Result

	Rider	Team	Time
1	Jack Bobridge (AUS)	Garmin–Transitions	4h 48' 25"
2	Rubén Pérez (ESP)	Euskaltel–Euskadi	+ 4"
3	Thomas De Gendt (BEL)	Topsport Vlaanderen–Mercator	+ 4"
4	Michael Van Stayen (BEL)	Topsport Vlaanderen–Mercator	+ 4"
5	Gorik Gardeyn (BEL)	Vacansoleil	+ 4"
6	Dominik Nerz (GER)	Team Milram	+ 8"
7	Gert Steegmans (BEL)	Team RadioShack	+ 15"
8	Borut Božič (SLO)	Vacansoleil	+ 15"
9	Lucas Sebastián Haedo (ARG)	Team Saxo Bank	+ 15"
10	Sergey Lagutin (UZB)	Vacansoleil	+ 15"

General Classification after Stage 5

	Rider	Team	Time
1	Tony Martin (GER)	Team HTC–Columbia	23h 18' 10"
2	Koos Moerenhout (NED)	Rabobank	+ 10"
3	Edvald Boasson Hagen (NOR)	Team Sky	+ 1' 24"
4	Svein Tuft (CAN)	Garmin–Transitions	+ 1' 26"
5	Lars Boom (NED)	Rabobank	+ 1' 32"
6	Richie Porte (AUS)	Team Saxo Bank	+ 1' 35"
7	Dominique Cornu (BEL)	Skil–Shimano	+ 1' 39"
8	Jürgen Roelandts (BEL)	Omega Pharma–Lotto	+ 1' 42"
9	Andreas Klöden (GER)	Team RadioShack	+ 1' 43"
10	Daniel Oss (ITA)	Liquigas–Doimo	+ 1' 43"

=== Stage 6 ===
23 August 2010 – Bilzen (Belgium) to Heers (Belgium), 205.6 km (127.8 mi)

Stage 6 Result

	Rider	Team	Time
1	André Greipel (GER)	Team HTC–Columbia	5h 12' 25"
2	Jürgen Roelandts (BEL)	Omega Pharma–Lotto	s.t.
3	Edvald Boasson Hagen (NOR)	Team Sky	s.t.
4	Elia Viviani (ITA)	Liquigas–Doimo	s.t.
5	Lucas Sebastián Haedo (ARG)	Team Saxo Bank	s.t.
6	Koen de Kort (NED)	Skil–Shimano	s.t.
7	Daniel Oss (ITA)	Liquigas–Doimo	s.t.
8	Tony Martin (GER)	Team HTC–Columbia	s.t.
9	Maxime Vantomme (BEL)	Team Katusha	s.t.
10	Iñaki Isasi (ESP)	Euskaltel–Euskadi	s.t.

General Classification after Stage 6

	Rider	Team	Time
1	Tony Martin (GER)	Team HTC–Columbia	28h 30' 33"
2	Koos Moerenhout (NED)	Rabobank	+ 11"
3	Edvald Boasson Hagen (NOR)	Team Sky	+ 1' 22"
4	Svein Tuft (CAN)	Garmin–Transitions	+ 1' 28"
5	Lars Boom (NED)	Rabobank	+ 1' 31"
6	Richie Porte (AUS)	Team Saxo Bank	+ 1' 37"
7	Jürgen Roelandts (BEL)	Omega Pharma–Lotto	+ 1' 38"
8	Dominique Cornu (BEL)	Skil–Shimano	+ 1' 41"
9	Andreas Klöden (GER)	Team RadioShack	+ 1' 45"
10	Daniel Oss (ITA)	Liquigas–Doimo	+ 1' 45"

=== Stage 7 ===
24 August 2010 – Genk (Belgium), 16.9 km (10.5 mi)

Stage 7 Result

	Rider	Team	Time
1	Tony Martin (GER)	Team HTC–Columbia	20' 24"
2	Maarten Tjallingii (NED)	Rabobank	+ 6"
3	Alex Rasmussen (DEN)	Team Saxo Bank	+ 9"
4	Richie Porte (AUS)	Team Saxo Bank	+ 20"
5	Koos Moerenhout (NED)	Rabobank	+ 20"
6	Edvald Boasson Hagen (NOR)	Team Sky	+ 24"
7	Jos van Emden (NED)	Rabobank	+ 24"
8	Jonathan Castroviejo (ESP)	Euskaltel–Euskadi	+ 27"
9	Andreas Klöden (GER)	Team RadioShack	+ 33"
10	Svein Tuft (CAN)	Garmin–Transitions	+ 36"

Final General Classification

	Rider	Team	Time
1	Tony Martin (GER)	Team HTC–Columbia	28h 50' 57"
2	Koos Moerenhout (NED)	Rabobank	+ 31"
3	Edvald Boasson Hagen (NOR)	Team Sky	+ 1' 46"
4	Richie Porte (AUS)	Team Saxo Bank	+ 1' 57"
5	Svein Tuft (CAN)	Garmin–Transitions	+ 2' 04"
6	Lars Boom (NED)	Rabobank	+ 2' 11"
7	Maarten Tjallingii (NED)	Rabobank	+ 2' 17"
8	Andreas Klöden (GER)	Team RadioShack	+ 2' 18"
9	Dominique Cornu (BEL)	Skil–Shimano	+ 2' 35"
10	Jürgen Roelandts (BEL)	Omega Pharma–Lotto	+ 2' 37"

== Final standings ==
=== General classification ===
	Rider	Team	Time
1	Tony Martin (GER)	Team HTC–Columbia	28h 50' 57"
2	Koos Moerenhout (NED)	Rabobank	+ 31"
3	Edvald Boasson Hagen (NOR)	Team Sky	+ 1' 46"
4	Richie Porte (AUS)	Team Saxo Bank	+ 1′ 57"
5	Svein Tuft (CAN)	Garmin–Transitions	+ 2′ 04"
6	Lars Boom (NED)	Rabobank	+ 2′ 11"
7	Maarten Tjallingii (NED)	Rabobank	+ 2′ 17"
8	Andreas Klöden (GER)	Team RadioShack	+ 2′ 18"
9	Dominique Cornu (BEL)	Skil–Shimano	+ 2′ 35"
10	Jürgen Roelandts (BEL)	Omega Pharma–Lotto	+ 2′ 37"

=== Points classification ===
	Rider	Team	Points
1	Edvald Boasson Hagen (NOR)	Team Sky	103
2	Robbie McEwen (AUS)	Team Katusha	80
3	Tony Martin (GER)	Team HTC–Columbia	80
4	André Greipel (GER)	Team HTC–Columbia	79
5	Jürgen Roelandts (BEL)	Omega Pharma–Lotto	74
6	Lucas Sebastian Haedo (ARG)	Team Saxo Bank	72
7	Koos Moerenhout (NED)	Rabobank	55
8	Thomas De Gendt (BEL)	Topsport Vlaanderen–Mercator	46
9	Alex Rasmussen (DEN)	Team Saxo Bank	41
10	Jack Bobridge (AUS)	Garmin–Transitions	35

=== Young Riders' classification ===
	Rider	Team	Time
1	Tony Martin (GER)	Team HTC–Columbia	28h 50′ 57"
2	Edvald Boasson Hagen (NOR)	Team Sky	+ 1′ 46"
3	Richie Porte (AUS)	Team Saxo Bank	+ 1′ 57"
4	Lars Boom (NED)	Rabobank	+ 2′ 11"
5	Dominique Cornu (FRA)	Skil–Shimano	+ 2′ 35"
6	Jürgen Roelandts (BEL)	Omega Pharma–Lotto	+ 2′ 37"
7	Simon Špilak (SLO)	Lampre–Farnese Vini	+ 2′ 44"
8	Tiago Machado (POR)	Team RadioShack	+ 2′ 50"
9	Jos van Emden (NED)	Rabobank	+ 2′ 56"
10	Daniel Oss (ITA)	Liquigas–Doimo	+ 3′ 06"

=== Team classification ===
	Team	Points
1	(Netherlands) Rabobank	86h 36' 58"
2	(Denmark) Team Saxo Bank	+ 2' 10"
3	(United States) Team RadioShack	+ 3' 30"
4	(Belgium) Topsport Vlaanderen–Mercator	+ 6' 46"
5	(Spain) Euskaltel–Euskadi	+ 7' 18"
6	(Russia) Team Katusha	+ 7' 50"
7	(Italy) Liquigas–Doimo	+ 13' 54"
8	(Netherlands) Vacansoleil	+ 14' 28"
9	(Netherlands) Skil–Shimano	+ 15' 44"
10	(United Kingdom) Team Sky	+ 15' 52"

== Classification leadership table ==
Stage	Winner	General classification Algemeen Klassement	Points classification Puntentrui	Young Rider Classification Jongerentrui	Team classification Ploegenklassement
P	Svein Tuft	Svein Tuft	Svein Tuft	Jos van Emden	Rabobank
1	Robbie McEwen	Svein Tuft	Robbie McEwen	Jos van Emden	Rabobank
2	André Greipel	Svein Tuft	Robbie McEwen	Edvald Boasson Hagen	Rabobank
3	Koos Moerenhout	Tony Martin	Robbie McEwen	Tony Martin	Rabobank
4	Greg Henderson	Tony Martin	Robbie McEwen	Tony Martin	Rabobank
5	Jack Bobridge	Tony Martin	Robbie McEwen	Tony Martin	Rabobank
6	André Greipel	Tony Martin	Edvald Boasson Hagen	Tony Martin	Rabobank
7	Tony Martin	Tony Martin	Edvald Boasson Hagen	Tony Martin	Rabobank
Final		Tony Martin	Edvald Boasson Hagen	Tony Martin	Rabobank
