= 2009 UCI Road World Championships – Men's time trial =

Men's Individual Time Trial
2009 UCI Road World Championships
- Rainbow jersey

Race details
- Dates: 2009-09-24 in (Switzerland) Mendrisio (SUI)
- Stages: 1
- Distance: 49.8 km (30.94 mi)
- Winning time: 00h 57' 55.74"

Results
	Winner	Fabian Cancellara (SUI)	(Switzerland)
	Second	Gustav Larsson (SWE)	(Sweden)
	Third	Tony Martin (GER)	(Germany)

The Men's time trial of the 2009 UCI Road World Championships cycling event took place on 24 September in Mendrisio, Switzerland.

== Starting order ==
Group 1				Group 2				Group 3				Group 4				Group 5			
66	Saint Kitts and Nevis	James Weekes	66	53	Saint Kitts and Nevis	Reginald Douglas	65	40	Namibia	Erik Hoffmann	43	27	Latvia	Raivis Belohvoščiks	45	14	United States	Tom Danielson	23
65	Finland	Jarmo Rissanen	61	52	Kyrgyzstan	Eugen Wacker	29	39	Finland	Matti Helminen	57	26	Ukraine	Dmytro Hrabovs'kyj	58	13	Russia	Michail Ignat'ev	57
64	Hungary	Rida Cador	55	51	Ecuador	José Ragonessi	60	38	Australia	Adam Hansen	30	25	Germany	Sebastian Lang	20	12	Netherlands	Lars Boom	16
63	Colombia	José Serpa	22	50	South Africa	Jay Robert Thomson	28	37	France	Jérôme Coppel	56	24	Slovakia	Martin Velits	34	11	Kazakhstan	Aleksandr Vinokurov	8
62	Belarus	Branislaŭ Samojlaŭ	37	49	Slovenia	Gregor Gazvoda	48	36	Argentina	Martín Garrido	32	23	Belgium	Dominique Cornu	14	10	Slovenia	Janez Brajkovič	6
61	Australia	Cameron Wurf	53	48	Slovakia	Pavol Polievka	52	35	Great Britain	Chris Froome	18	22	Ukraine	Andrij Hrivko	41	9	Norway	Edvald Boasson Hagen	27
60	Romania	Gabriel Pop	64	47	Romania	Eduard Novak	63	34	Sweden	Fredrik Ericsson	39	21	Russia	Artem Ovechkin	17	8	Czech Republic	František Raboň	19
59	France	Jean-Christophe Péraud	12	46	Brazil	Magno Nazaret	46	33	Denmark	Lars Bak	13	20	Lithuania	Ignatas Konovalovas	45	7	Canada	Svein Tuft	15
58	Portugal	Sérgio Paulinho	26	45	Ireland	David McCann	45	32	New Zealand	Jeremy Vennell	50	19	Portugal	Tiago Machado	54	6	Belgium	Sébastien Rosseler	38
57	Argentina	Matías Médici	44	44	United States	Tom Zirbel	4	31	Spain	Juan José Cobo	42	18	Denmark	Alex Rasmussen	24	5	Germany	Tony Martin	3
56	Hungary	Zoltán Madaras	62	43	Estonia	Ervin Korts-Laur	52	30	Netherlands	Koos Moerenhout	7	17	Belarus	Vasil Kiryienka	49	4	Great Britain	Bradley Wiggins	21
55	Poland	Bartosz Huzarski	33	42	Colombia	Juan Carlos López Marín	36	29	Poland	Maciej Bodnar	59	17	Italy	Marco Pinotti	5	3	Sweden	Gustav Larsson	2
54	Spain	José Iván Gutiérrez	35	41	Switzerland	Rubens Bertogliati	40	28	Kazakhstan	Andrej Kašečkin	25	15	Latvia	Aleksejs Saramotins	31	2	Switzerland	Fabian Cancellara	1
												1	Germany	Bert Grabsch	10				

== Final classification (top 30) ==
Rank	Cyclist	Time
1	(Switzerland) Fabian Cancellara (SUI)	57'55:74"
2	(Sweden) Gustav Larsson (SWE)	+01'27.13"
3	(Germany) Tony Martin (GER)	+02'30.18"
4	(Italy) Marco Pinotti (ITA)	+03'02.88"
5	(Slovenia) Janez Brajkovič (SLO)	+03'08.49"
6	(Netherlands) Koos Moerenhout (NED)	+03'11.59"
7	(Kazakhstan) Alexander Vinokourov (KAZ)	+03'20.95"
8	(Lithuania) Ignatas Konovalovas (LIT)	+03'33.88"
9	(Germany) Bert Grabsch (GER)	+03'37.39"
10	(Republic of Ireland) David McCann (IRL)	+03.40:61
11	(France) Jean-Christophe Péraud (FRA)	+03'37:39"
12	(Denmark) Lars Bak (DEN)	+04'07:66"
13	(Belgium) Dominique Cornu (BEL)	+04'09.40"
14	(Canada) Svein Tuft (CAN)	+04'24.25"
15	(Netherlands) Lars Boom (NED)	+04'24.85"
16	(Russia) Artem Ovechkin (RUS)	+04'27.64"
17	(United Kingdom) Chris Froome (GBR)	+04'34.55"
18	(Czech Republic) František Raboň (CZE)	+04'39.67"
19	(Germany) Sebastian Lang (GER)	+04'40.97"
20	(United Kingdom) Bradley Wiggins (GBR)	+04'50.39"
21	(Colombia) José Serpa (COL)	+04'56.25"
22	(United States) Tom Danielson (USA)	+05'09.45"
23	(Denmark) Alex Rasmussen (DEN)	+05'12.60"
24	(Kazakhstan) Andrey Kashechkin (KAZ)	+05'16.82"
25	(Portugal) Sérgio Paulinho (POR)	+05'25.86"
26	(Norway) Edvald Boasson Hagen (NOR)	+05'28.44"
27	(South Africa) Jay Robert Thomson (RSA)	+05'28.71"
28	(Kyrgyzstan) Eugen Wacker (KGZ)	+05'31.07"
29	(Australia) Adam Hansen (AUS)	+05'33.54"
30	(Latvia) Aleksejs Saramotins (LAT)	+05'34.76"
