= David Albós =

Andorran road cyclist (born 1984)

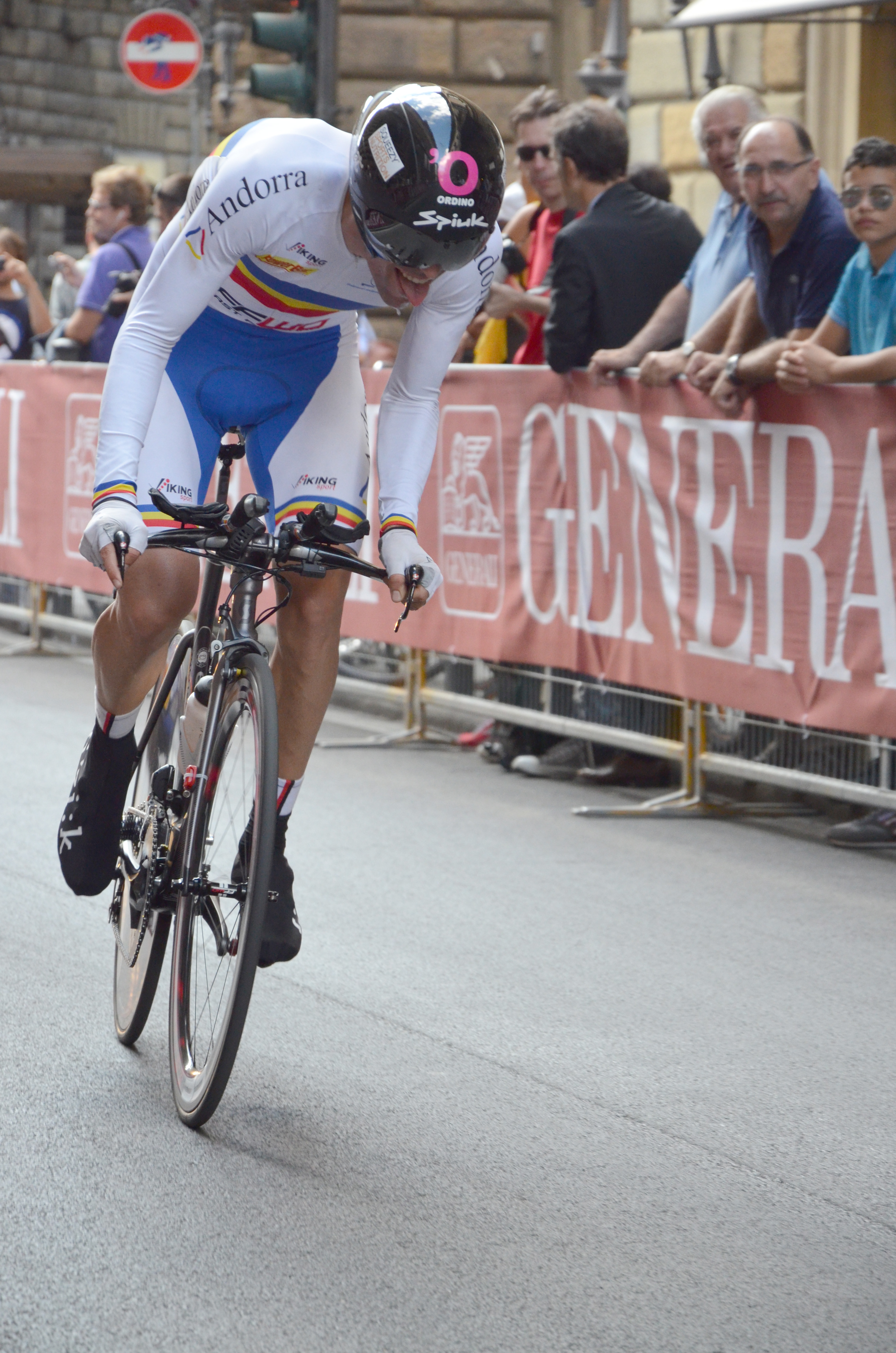
- Albós at the 2013 UCI World Time Trial Championships

Personal information
- Full name: David Albós Cavaliere
- Born: 7 March 1984 (age 42) Escaldes-Engordany, Andorra

Cycling career
- Sport: Cycling
- Current team: Retired
- Discipline: Road
- Role: Rider
- Rider type: Time trialist

Amateur team
- 2008–2017: Agrupació Ciclista Andorrana

Professional team
- 2011: CJAM–CKT–Novatec
Medal record
Representing Andorra
Games of the Small States of Europe
Silver medal – second place	2017 San Marino	Team road race

David Albós Cavaliere (born 7 March 1984) is an Andorran former professional road racing cyclist. He competed with CJAM-CKT-Novatec in 2011, and also with the national team, Agrupació Ciclista Andorrana.

Albós competed in the 2011, the 2012, the 2013, and the 2015 UCI World Time Trial Championships. Albós won the National Time Trial Championships a record seven times. Originally a skier, Albós began competitive cycling in 2008. His brothers Ludovic Albós Cavaliere and Joan Albós Cavaliere are ski mountaineers.

== Major results ==
2008
1st Time trial, National Road Championships
2009
1st Time trial, National Road Championships
2010
1st Time trial, National Road Championships
2011
1st Time trial, National Road Championships
5th Time trial, Games of the Small States of Europe
2012
1st Time trial, National Time Trial Championships
2013
2nd Time trial, National Road Championships
6th Time trial, Games of the Small States of Europe
2014
1st Time trial, National Road Championships
2015
1st Time trial, National Road Championships
