= 2008 UCI Road World Championships – Men's time trial =

Men's Time Trial
2008 UCI Road World Championships
- Rainbow jersey

Race details
- Dates: 25 September
- Stages: 1
- Winning time: 52' 01.60"

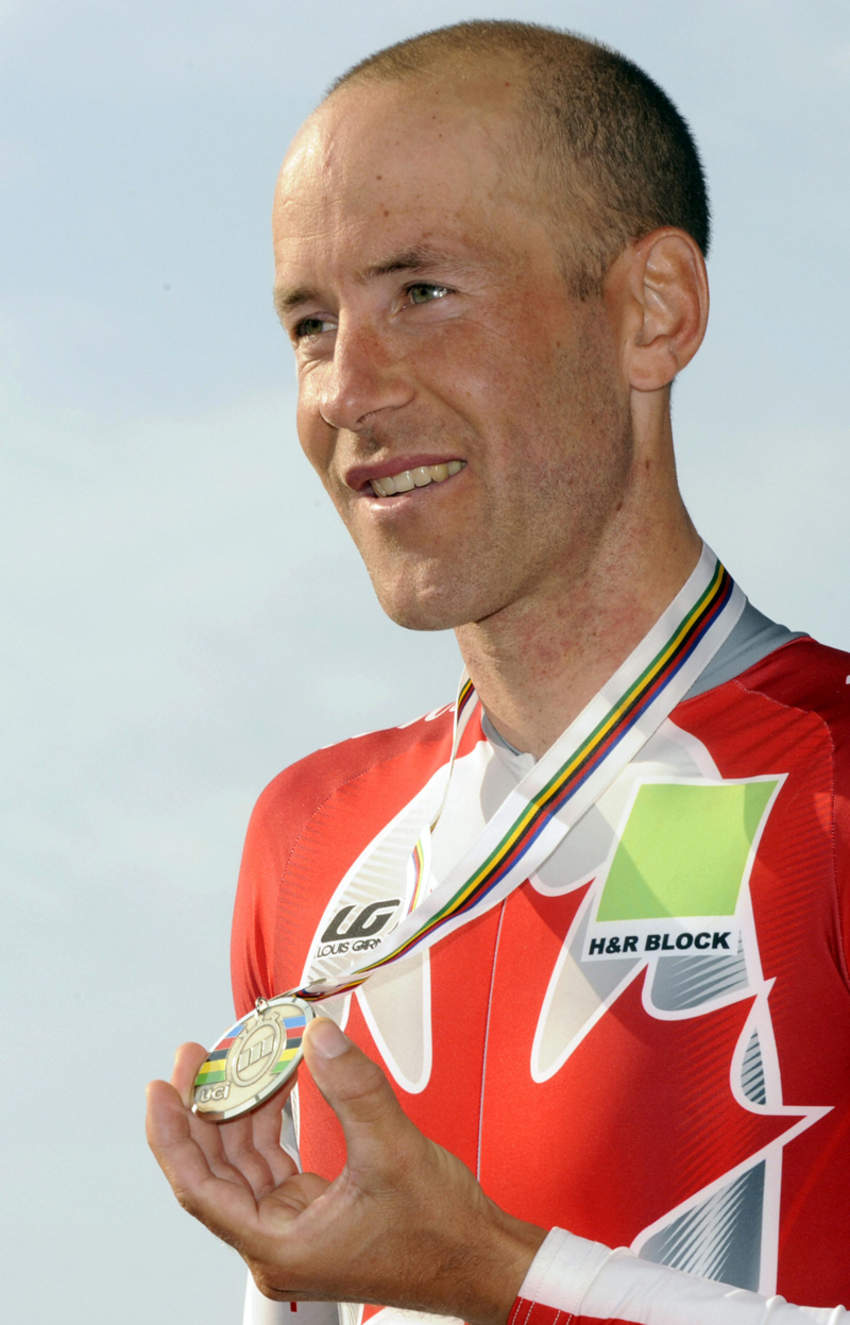
Svein Tuft from Canada won silver

The 2008 edition of the UCI Road World Championships Time Trial took place on September 25 in Varese, Italy.

== Final classification ==
	Cyclist	Nation		Time
1st place, gold medalist(s)	Bert Grabsch	Germany	en	52 min 01 s 60
2nd place, silver medalist(s)	Svein Tuft	Canada	+	42 s 79
3rd place, bronze medalist(s)	David Zabriskie	United States	+	52 s 27
4	Levi Leipheimer	United States	+	1 min 05 s 42
5	Gustav Larsson	Sweden	+	1 min 05 s 84
6	Stijn Devolder	Belgium	+	1 min 15 s 41
7	Tony Martin	Germany	+	1 min 16 s 26
8	Janez Brajkovič	Slovenia	+	1 min 25 s 16
9	David Millar	Great Britain	+	1 min 25 s 26
10	Sylvain Chavanel	France	+	1 min 25 s 82
11	Vladimir Gusev	Russia	+	1 min 27 s 13
12	Michael Rogers	Australia	+	1 min 33 s 32
13	Marco Pinotti	Italy	+	1 min 34 s 12
14	Manuel Quinziato	Italy	+	1 min 36 s 79
15	Serhiy Honchar	Ukraine	+	1 min 38 s 00
16	José Iván Gutiérrez	Spain	+	1 min 54 s 63
17	Matej Jurčo	Slovakia	+	1 min 58 s 00
18	Vasil Kiryienka	Belarus	+	2 min 11 s 71
19	Lars Bak	Denmark	+	2 min 23 s 43
20	Fredrik Ericsson	Sweden	+	2 min 27 s 78
21	Edvald Boasson Hagen	Norway	+	2 min 28 s 42
22	Stef Clement	Netherlands	+	2 min 30 s 87
23	Eugen Wacker	Kyrgyzstan	+	2 min 34 s 03
24	Michael Blaudzun	Denmark	+	2 min 40 s 49
25	Steve Cummings	Great Britain	+	2 min 54 s 97
26	Mikhail Ignatiev	Russia	+	2 min 55 s 46
27	Andrei Kunitski	Belarus	+	3 min 08 s 62
28	Łukasz Bodnar	Poland	+	3 min 11 s 57
29	Rein Taaramäe	Estonia	+	3 min 20 s 25
30	Rubens Bertogliati	Switzerland	+	3 min 20 s 99
31	Tanel Kangert	Estonia	+	3 min 29 s 61
32	Rubén Plaza	Spain	+	3 min 29 s 82
33	Leif Hoste	Belgium	+	3 min 30 s 65
34	Adam Hansen	Australia	+	3 min 49 s 54
35	Gregor Gazvoda	Slovenia	+	3 min 57 s 91
36	Maciej Bodnar	Poland	+	4 min 01 s 12
37	Ignatas Konovalovas	Lithuania	+	4 min 01 s 21
38	František Raboň	Czech Republic	+	4 min 01 s 37
39	Félix Cárdenas	Colombia	+	4 min 11 s 56
40	Sergiy Matveyev	Ukraine	+	4 min 19 s 18
41	Thomas Frei	Switzerland	+	4 min 24 s 45
42	Jérôme Coppel	France	+	4 min 25 s 60
43	Ruslan Ivanov	Moldova	+	4 min 28 s 15
44	Muradian Khalmuratov	Uzbekistan	+	4 min 32 s 01
45	Roman Kireyev	Kazakhstan	+	4 min 32 s 12
46	Raivis Belohvoščiks	Latvia	+	4 min 34 s 83
47	Andrey Zeits	Kazakhstan	+	4 min 56 s 48
48	Henry Raabe	Costa Rica	+	4 min 59 s 98
49	Benoît Joachim	Luxembourg	+	5 min 07 s 29
50	Robert Nagy	Slovakia	+	5 min 38 s 21
51	Dan Craven	Namibia	+	5 min 39 s 36
52	Matti Helminen	Finland	+	5 min 40 s 76
53	Vladimir Tuychiev	Uzbekistan	+	5 min 46 s 38
54	Zoltán Madaras	Hungary	+	6 min 32 s 44
55	Esad Hasanović	Serbia	+	7 min 17 s 14
56	Gabriel Sorin Pop	Romania	+	8 min 24 s 54
57	George-Daniel Anghelache	Romania	+	8 min 43 s 14
	Mauricio Soler	Colombia		Did not finish
