= Tony Martin (cyclist) =

German professional road bicycle racer

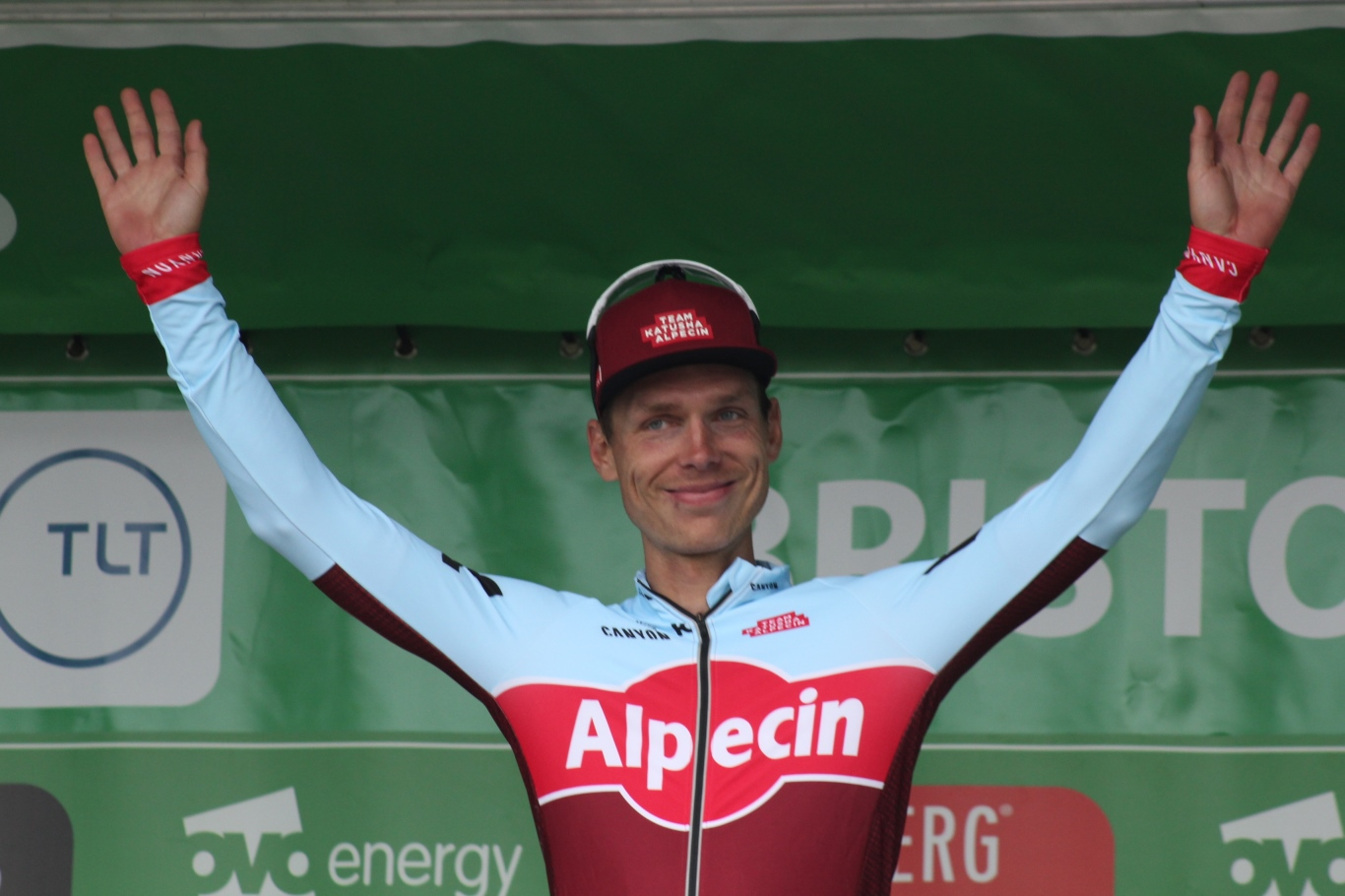
- Martin at the 2018 Tour of Britain

Personal information
- Full name: Tony Hans-Joachim Martin
- Nickname: Panzerwagen
- Born: 23 April 1985 (age 41) Cottbus, East Germany
- Height: 1.85 m (6 ft 1 in)
- Weight: 75 kg (165 lb; 11 st 11 lb)

Cycling career
- Sport: Cycling
- Current team: Retired
- Discipline: Road
- Role: Rider
- Rider type: Time trialist Domestique; Rouleur

Amateur teams
- 2004: Köstritzer
- 2005: Gerolsteiner (stagiaire)
- 2006–2007: Thüringer Energie Team

Professional teams
- 2008–2011: Team High Road
- 2012–2016: Omega Pharma–Quick-Step
- 2017–2018: Team Katusha–Alpecin
- 2019–2021: Team Jumbo–Visma

Major wins
- Grand Tours Tour de France 5 individual stages (2011, 2013, 2014, 2015) 1 TTT stage (2019) Vuelta a España 2 individual stages (2011, 2014) Stage races Eneco Tour (2010) Paris–Nice (2011) Tour of Beijing (2011, 2012) Tour of Belgium (2012, 2013, 2014) Volta ao Algarve (2011, 2013) One-day races and Classics World Time Trial Championships (2011, 2012, 2013, 2016) National Time Trial Championships (2010, 2012–2019, 2021)
Medal record
Men's road bicycle racing
Representing Germany
Olympic Games
Silver medal – second place	2012 London	Time trial
World Championships
Gold medal – first place	2011 Copenhagen	Time trial
Gold medal – first place	2012 Valkenburg	Time trial
Gold medal – first place	2013 Florence	Time trial
Gold medal – first place	2016 Doha	Time trial
Gold medal – first place	2021 Flanders	Mixed team relay
Silver medal – second place	2014 Ponferrada	Time trial
Silver medal – second place	2019 Yorkshire	Mixed team relay
Bronze medal – third place	2009 Mendrisio	Time trial
Bronze medal – third place	2010 Melbourne	Time trial
Representing Omega Pharma–Quick-Step (2012–2014) Etixx–Quick-Step (2015–2016)
World Championships
Gold medal – first place	2012 Valkenburg	Team time trial
Gold medal – first place	2013 Florence	Team time trial
Gold medal – first place	2016 Doha	Team time trial
Silver medal – second place	2015 Richmond	Team time trial
Bronze medal – third place	2014 Ponferrada	Team time trial

Tony Hans-Joachim Martin (born 23 April 1985) is a German former professional road bicycle racer. Martin was known as a time trial specialist, and is a four-time world champion in the discipline – having won the title in 2011, 2012, 2013 and 2016 – which is joint-most with Fabian Cancellara and Remco Evenepoel. He also won a silver medal at the 2012 Summer Olympics in London, finishing runner-up to Bradley Wiggins in the event. Martin was also part of four world championship-winning team time trial squads, with Omega Pharma–Quick-Step/Etixx–Quick-Step, in 2012, 2013 and 2016, and with Germany in the mixed relay time-trial in 2021.

Martin won seven Grand Tour stages, including five individual time trial stages – three at the Tour de France in 2011, 2013 and 2014, and two at the Vuelta a España in 2011 and in 2014. In the mid-part of his career Martin was a successful stage racer, winning the Eneco Tour (2010), Paris–Nice (2011) and the first two editions of the Tour of Beijing in 2011 and 2012. In the latter part of his career he became a super-domestique and road captain at Team Jumbo–Visma.

== Early life ==
Born in Cottbus, East Germany, Martin and the rest of his family escaped from East Germany shortly before the fall of the Berlin Wall and the collapse of communist Eastern Europe. Later, he returned to the eastern part of Germany to attend sport school in Erfurt.

== Career ==
=== Team High Road (2008–11) ===
==== 2008 ====
Having turned professional for the 2008 season, Martin took four victories during the year – he won the Hel van het Mergelland one-day race, as well as time trial stages at the Ster Elektrotoer, the Tour de l'Ain, and the Deutschland Tour. He also placed second to his teammate Marco Pinotti on the final time trial stage of the Giro d'Italia – his first start in a Grand Tour – and finished seventh in the time trial at the UCI Road World Championships.

==== 2009 ====
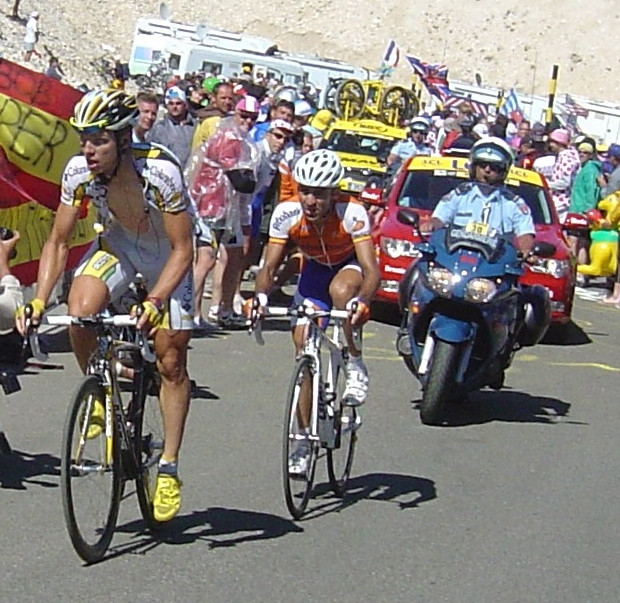
Martin (left) riding on Mont Ventoux at the 2009 Tour de France

In 2009, Martin won time trials in the Critérium International, and the Bayern Rundfahrt. He also featured strongly in week-long stage races, winning the mountain classifications at Paris–Nice, and the Tour de Suisse, finishing second overall and winning a stage in the latter. Martin also made an impact at the Tour de France, wearing the white jersey as leader of the young rider classification for twelve days (between stages 3 and 14), and winning the combativity award after finishing second on Stage 20 at the top of Mont Ventoux. He took the bronze medal in the time trial at the UCI Road World Championships at the end of the season.

==== 2010 ====
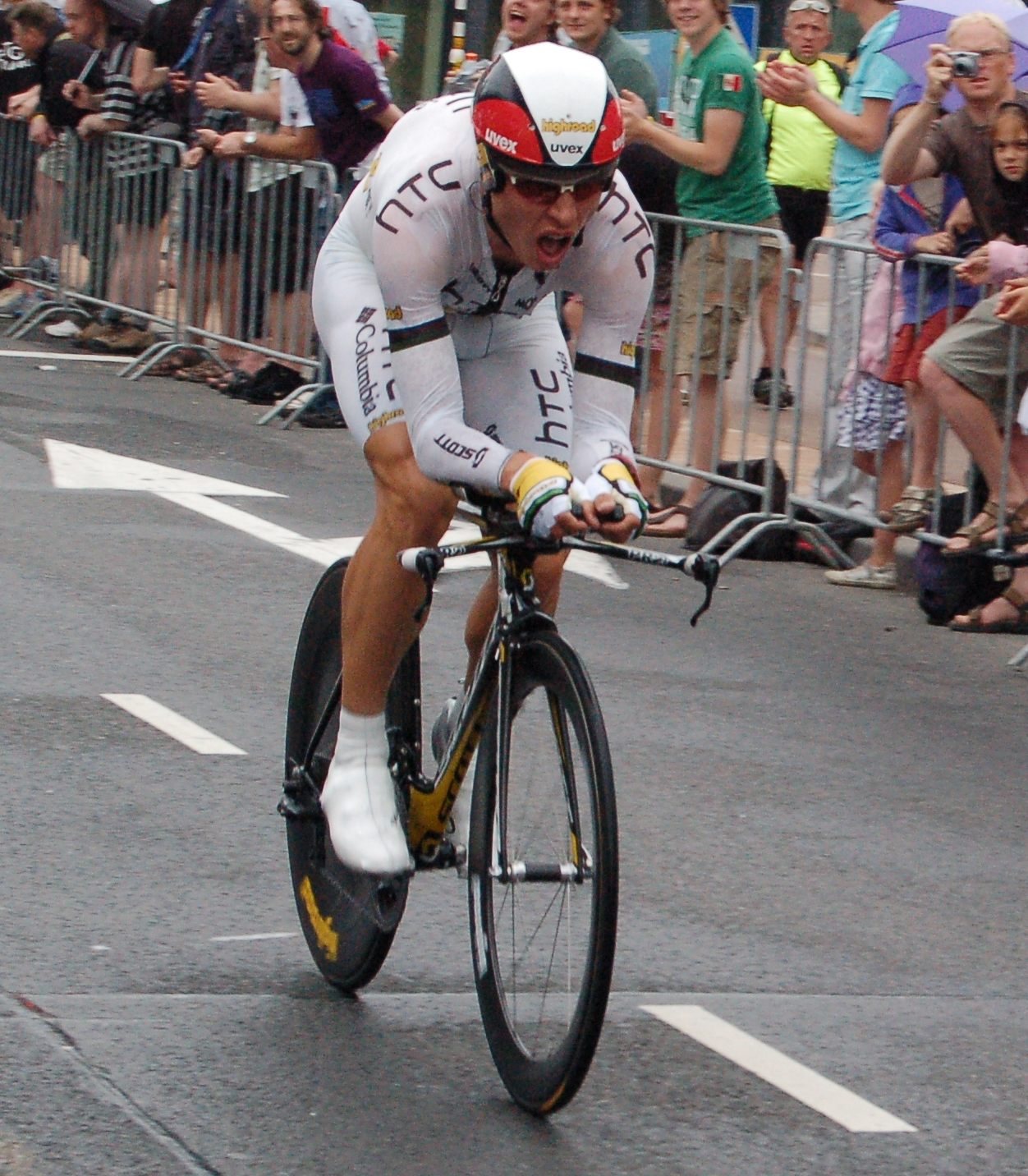
Martin at the 2010 Tour de France

Martin enjoyed more success in time trials in 2010, winning his first national championship title as well as stages in the Tour of California, and the Tour de Suisse. Martin finished second in the prologue and the Stage 19 individual time trial – behind Fabian Cancellara on both occasions – of the Tour de France, and again wore the white jersey as leader of the young rider classification on stages 1 to 3. Following the Tour de France, Martin finished first overall in the Eneco Tour, as well as the seventh stage time trial and the young rider classification. Martin again took the bronze medal at the time trial at the UCI Road World Championships.

==== 2011 ====
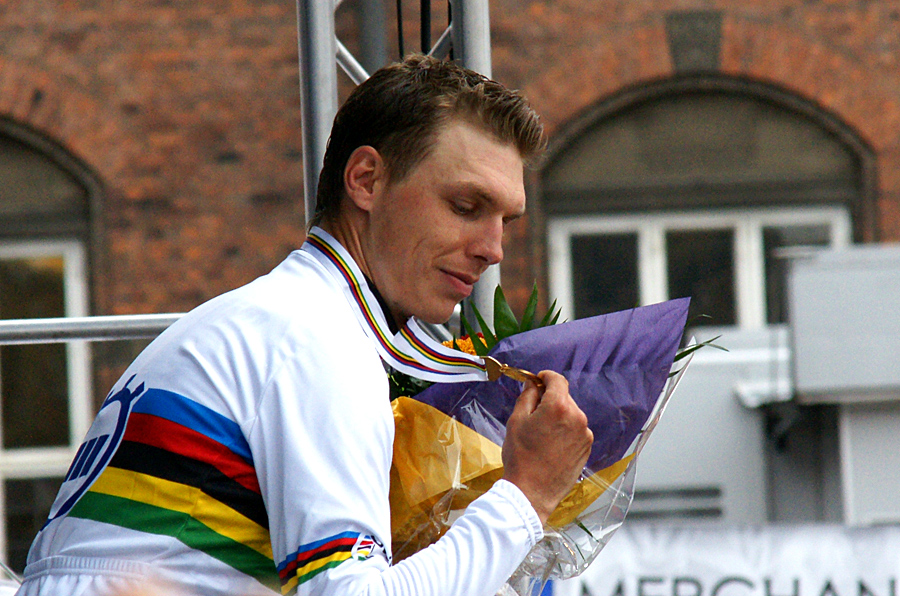
Martin in the rainbow jersey after winning the time trial at the 2011 UCI Road World Championships.

2011 saw Martin claim overall victories in the Volta ao Algarve, and Paris–Nice, having won time trials in both events. He also finished second overall in the Tour de Romandie, and won the time trial in the Critérium du Dauphiné. Martin won his first Grand Tour stage by taking victory in the Stage 20 individual time trial of the Tour de France. He also won the stage 10 time trial in the Vuelta a España. In September, Martin won the gold medal in the time trial at the UCI Road World Championships in Copenhagen, Denmark. He then won the opening time trial of the inaugural Tour of Beijing, and held the race lead for the rest of the event to claim overall victory.

=== Omega Pharma–Quick-Step (2012–16) ===
Following the announcement that HTC–Highroad would fold at the end of 2011, Martin signed with Omega Pharma–Quick-Step for the 2012 season.

==== 2012 ====
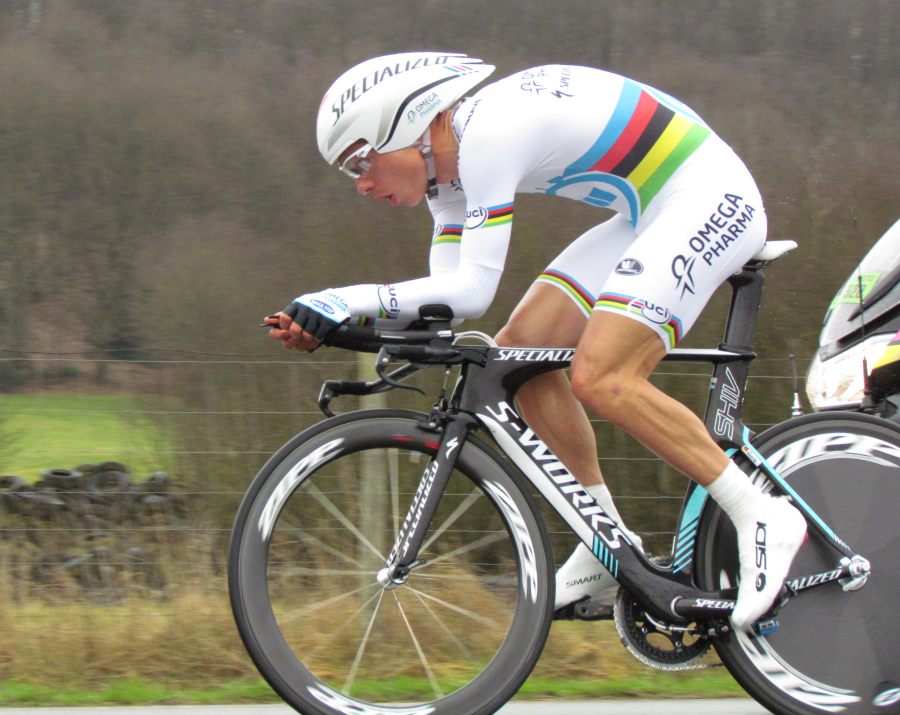
Martin at the 2012 Paris–Nice, wearing the rainbow jersey skinsuit of world champion.

Martin began 2012 with second overall in the Volta ao Algarve, finishing second to Bradley Wiggins by less than a second in the final time trial. In April, Martin lost consciousness after colliding with a car during training and sustained injuries, wrecking his early season. Martin returned to action at the Tour of Belgium in May, winning the time trial on Stage 4 and taking the overall victory.

At the Tour de France, Martin's hopes of winning the prologue, were dashed by a mechanical problem that forced him to switch bikes on course. Martin then crashed the following day on Stage 1, suffering a broken wrist. After suffering more mechanical problems in the next time trial, Stage 9, he withdrew from the competition so that his wrist would have more time to heal before the time trial at the Olympic Games three weeks later. Martin was deemed fit enough to compete, and he claimed silver at the Olympics behind Wiggins.

In September, Martin was part of the six-man Omega Pharma–Quick-Step team that won the inaugural team time trial for trade teams at the UCI Road World Championships. Three days later, he successfully defended his individual world title, beating Taylor Phinney by five seconds and passing Alberto Contador on course. In October, Martin went back to China to attempt to defend his Tour of Beijing title at the last UCI World Tour race of the season. He placed well in all the stages, but his overall win was attributed in large part to a solo victory on stage 2. Martin attacked the lead group with 25 kilometres (15.5 miles) remaining, on the climb of the Dong Gang Hong Tunnel, and sped away to win by around 45 seconds to record his first road stage win since the 2009 Tour de Suisse.

==== 2013 ====
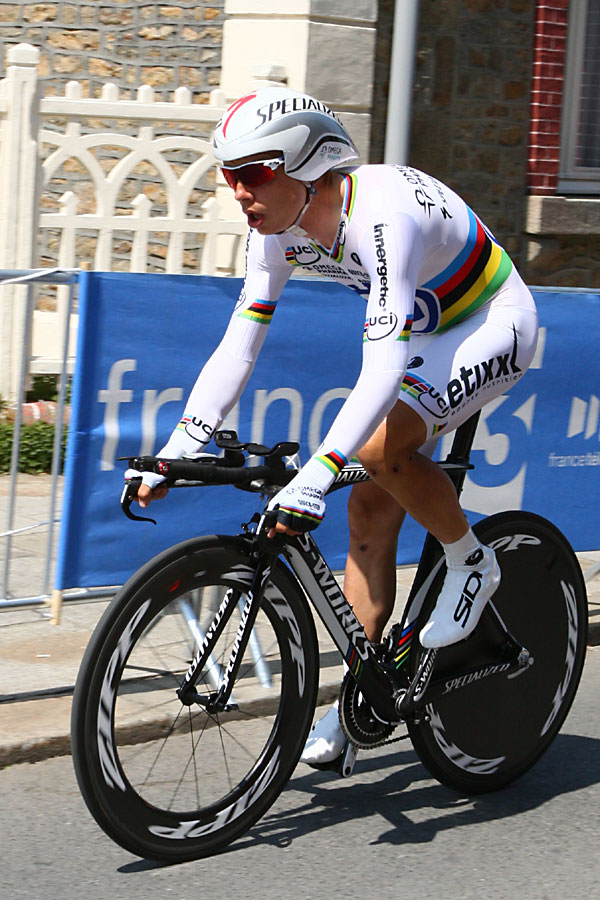
Martin on his way to victory on Stage 11 of the 2013 Tour de France

In February, Martin won the general classification of the Volta ao Algarve. He earned the leader's jersey on the fourth and last stage, a 34.8-kilometre (21.6-mile) individual time trial, which he won by over a minute from the next closest competitor, team-mate Michał Kwiatkowski. In the overall classification, he bested Kwiatkowski and Lieuwe Westra of Vacansoleil–DCM. In the Tour de France he was involved in a crash on the 1st stage which left him with a concussion and a contusion on his left lung. He recovered enough to win stage 11, an individual time trial. With an average speed of 54.271 kilometres per hour (33.722 miles per hour), Martin rode the third fastest Tour de France individual time trial stage at that time.

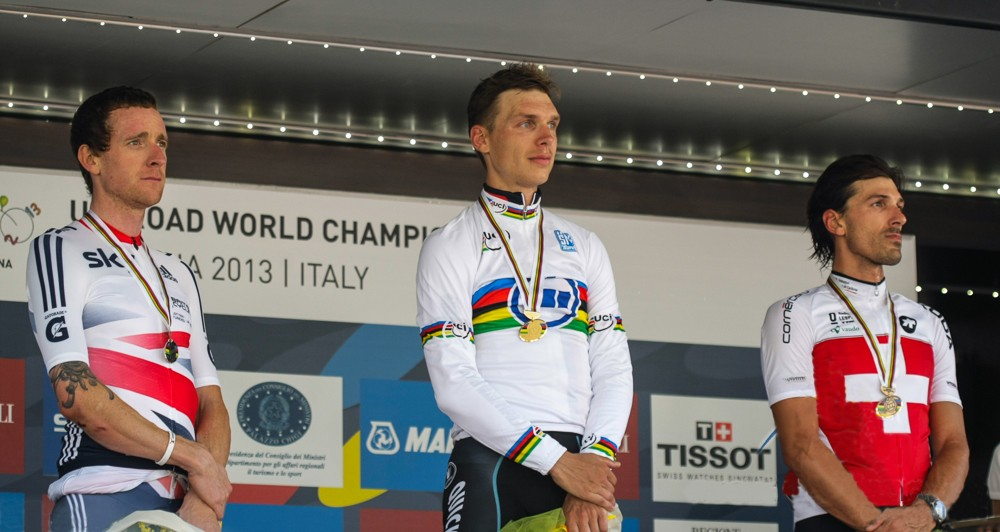
Martin took his third consecutive world time trial title at the 2013 UCI Road World Championships, ahead of Bradley Wiggins (left) and Fabian Cancellara (right).

In the sixth stage of Vuelta a España, Martin managed a 175-kilometre (109-mile) solo breakaway, averaging 27.7 mph (44.6 km/h), which was only caught in the final metres of the stage. Martin then went on to help his team Omega Pharma–Quick-Step to narrowly beat Orica–GreenEDGE in the team time trial at the UCI Road World Championships. He then emerged victorious once more in the individual time trial, beating second placed Bradley Wiggins by 46 seconds, who was a further two seconds ahead of four-time winner Fabian Cancellara.

In the off season, Martin had surgery in Hamburg to resolve the scaphoid non-union resulting from his 2012 Tour de France stage 1 crash. The Omega Pharma–Quick-Step team said he would wear a special cast for six weeks which would allow him to resume training before the cast was removed.

==== 2014 ====
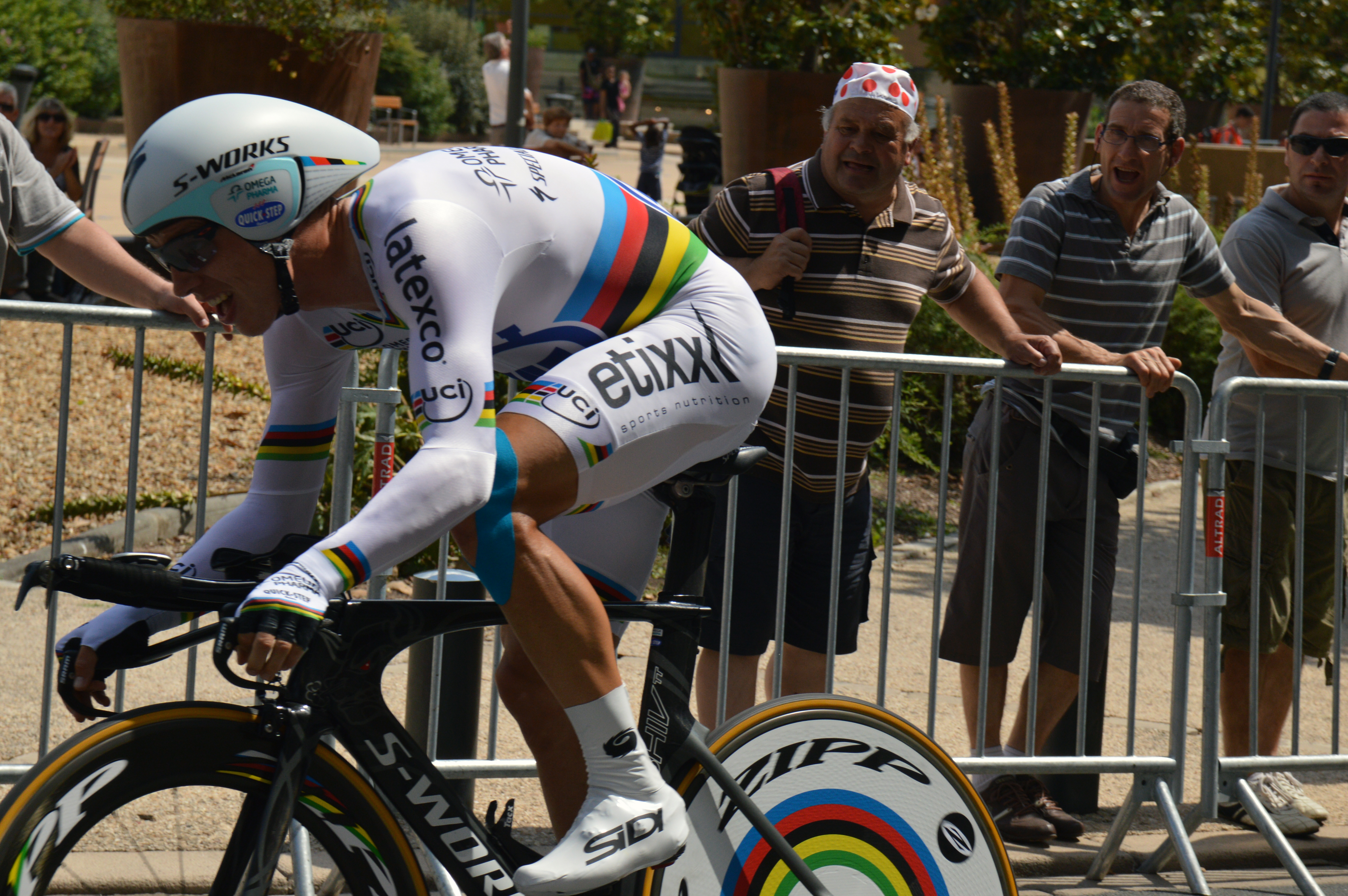
Martin at the 2014 Tour de France

On 1 June, he claimed his third consecutive Tour of Belgium and set a new record in doing so, surpassing 9 other riders who had managed to win the race two times. Martin then won the two time trials of the Tour de Suisse, finishing fourth overall after limiting his losses in the mountains. On 13 July, Martin won his first mass start road stage of the Tour de France. He was in a breakaway for 155 kilometres (96 miles), the final 60 kilometres (37 miles) in a solo effort to bring back memories of his Vuelta effort in 2013. This time Martin won the stage and was able to begin his celebrations some distance before the line. He topped his Tour off by winning the 20th stage time trial by a margin of 1 minute 39 seconds over his nearest rival. He went on to take another Grand Tour stage win at the Vuelta a España, clinching the individual time trial on stage 10. However he missed out on victory in the time trials at the UCI Road World Championships, taking the bronze medal alongside his Omega Pharma–Quick-Step teammates in the team event and the silver medal in the individual event, trailing Bradley Wiggins by 26 seconds.

==== 2015 ====
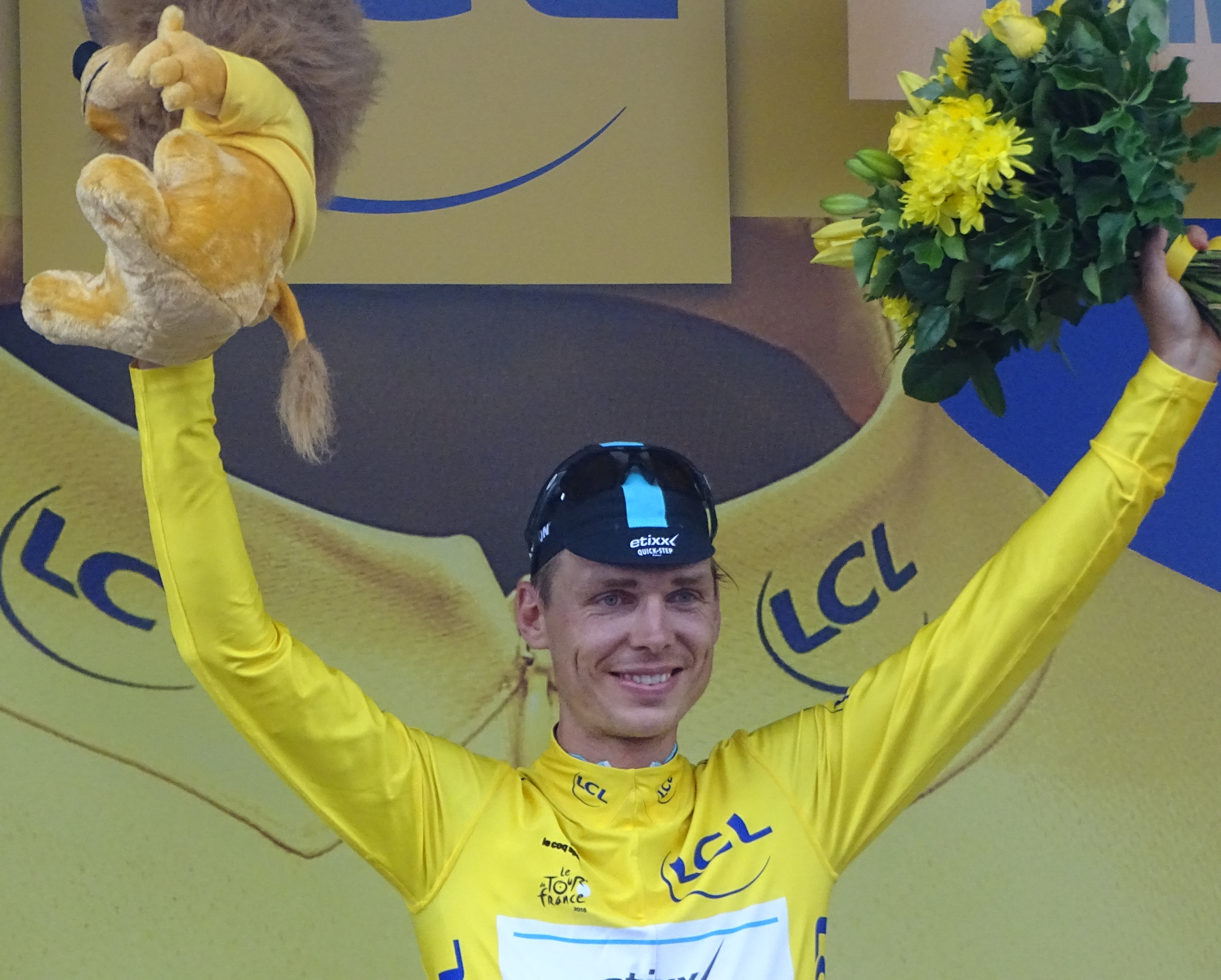
Martin was awarded the leader's yellow jersey after stage four of the 2015 Tour de France.

Martin had his first victory of the season in the individual time trial of the Volta ao Algarve. The second one came in May, at the Tour de Romandie, where he bettered Simon Špilak by eleven seconds in the rainy streets of Lausanne. At the end of June, he defended his German National Time Trial Championships title successfully.

At the Tour de France, Martin finished second behind Rohan Dennis (BMC Racing Team) in the opening time trial in Utrecht. Martin looked set to take the yellow jersey on Stage 2 when Dennis was dropped when the peloton split in crosswinds, but Fabian Cancellara outsprinted Martin's teammate Mark Cavendish to take third on the stage, and jump ahead of Martin into first place due to time bonuses. On Stage 3, Cancellara was involved in a large accident and lost time, but Martin again missed out on taking the yellow jersey, as Chris Froome (Team Sky) came home second at the finish on the Mur de Huy, and took the lead by one second over Martin due to the time bonus. On 7 July, Martin won Stage 4 after a short escape 3 kilometres (1.9 miles) before the finish, taking the yellow jersey for the first time in his career. He was riding on a bike borrowed from teammate Matteo Trentin, having had mechanical problems earlier in the race, which featured 13 kilometres (8.1 miles) of cobbles. On Stage 6, Martin crashed in the final kilometre on an uphill section while he was still in yellow and had to abandon the Tour because of a broken collarbone.

One month later, Martin returned to racing; although he fell short in the individual time trial in stage 4, he gained time over his main competitors and eventually won the overall of the Tour du Poitou-Charentes, his first stage race win of the season. However he missed out on a World Championship gold for the second year running; Etixx–Quick-Step finished second in the team time trial, 11 seconds behind the BMC Racing Team, and he struggled to seventh place in the individual event – his worst performance in the event since 2008, when he also finished seventh.

==== 2016 ====
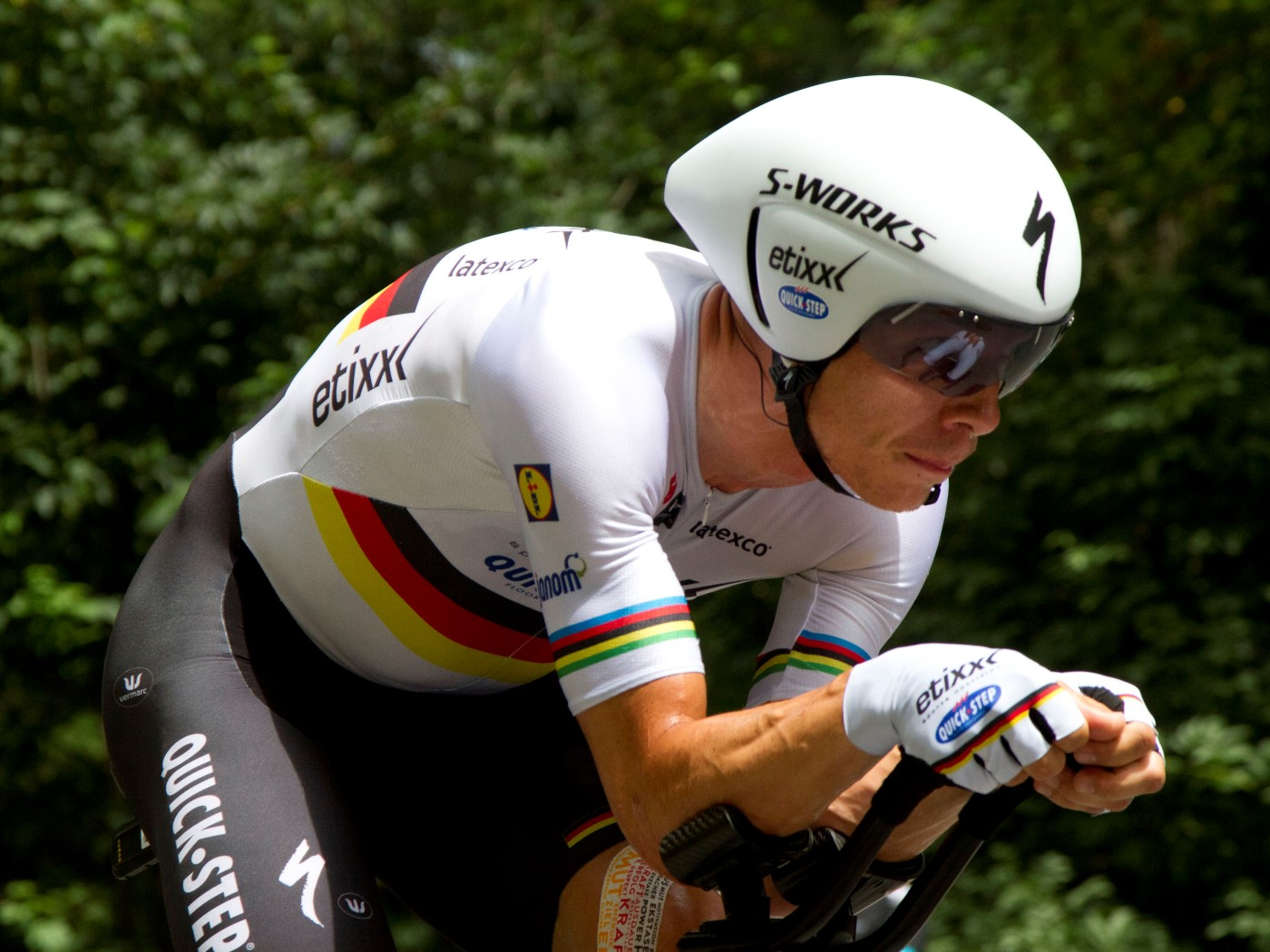
Martin at the 2016 Tour de France

Martin spent two days in the leader's jersey at the Volta ao Algarve in February, having finished second on the third stage – an individual time trial – before losing the lead on the final day. He finished fourth overall at March's Three Days of De Panne, again finishing second on an individual time trial stage. He took his first victory of the season, with his fifth consecutive victory (and sixth overall) in the German National Time Trial Championships in June. He won the individual time trial at the Tour of Britain, and finished his season with gold medals in both the team time trial and the individual time trial at the UCI Road World Championships.

=== Team Katusha–Alpecin (2017–18) ===
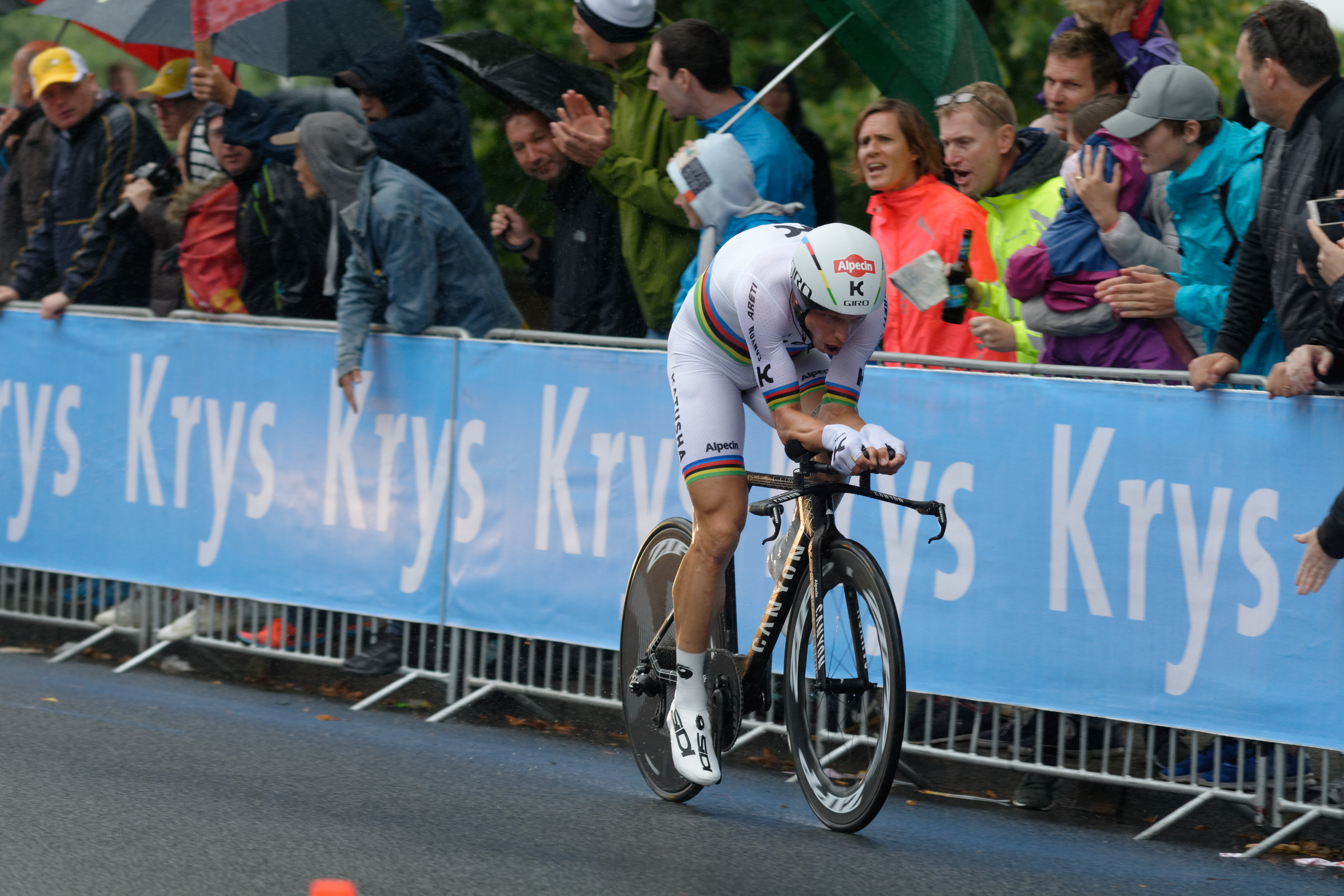
Martin at the 2017 Tour de France

In August 2016, Martin signed a two-year contract with Team Katusha–Alpecin from the 2017 season. In his first start with the team at the 2017 Volta a la Comunitat Valenciana, Martin took victory on the second stage with a 6-kilometre (3.7-mile) solo move. He finished on the overall podium at the 2017 Tour of Belgium in third place, before winning the German National Time Trial Championships for the seventh time. He finished eighth overall at the 2017 Tour of Britain, before finishing ninth in the time trial at the 2017 UCI Road World Championships – his worst placing in the event – having criticised the inclusion of an uphill finish on Fløyen. Martin's lone victory of the 2018 season came with a seventh consecutive win in the German National Time Trial Championships.

=== Team Jumbo–Visma (2019–21) ===
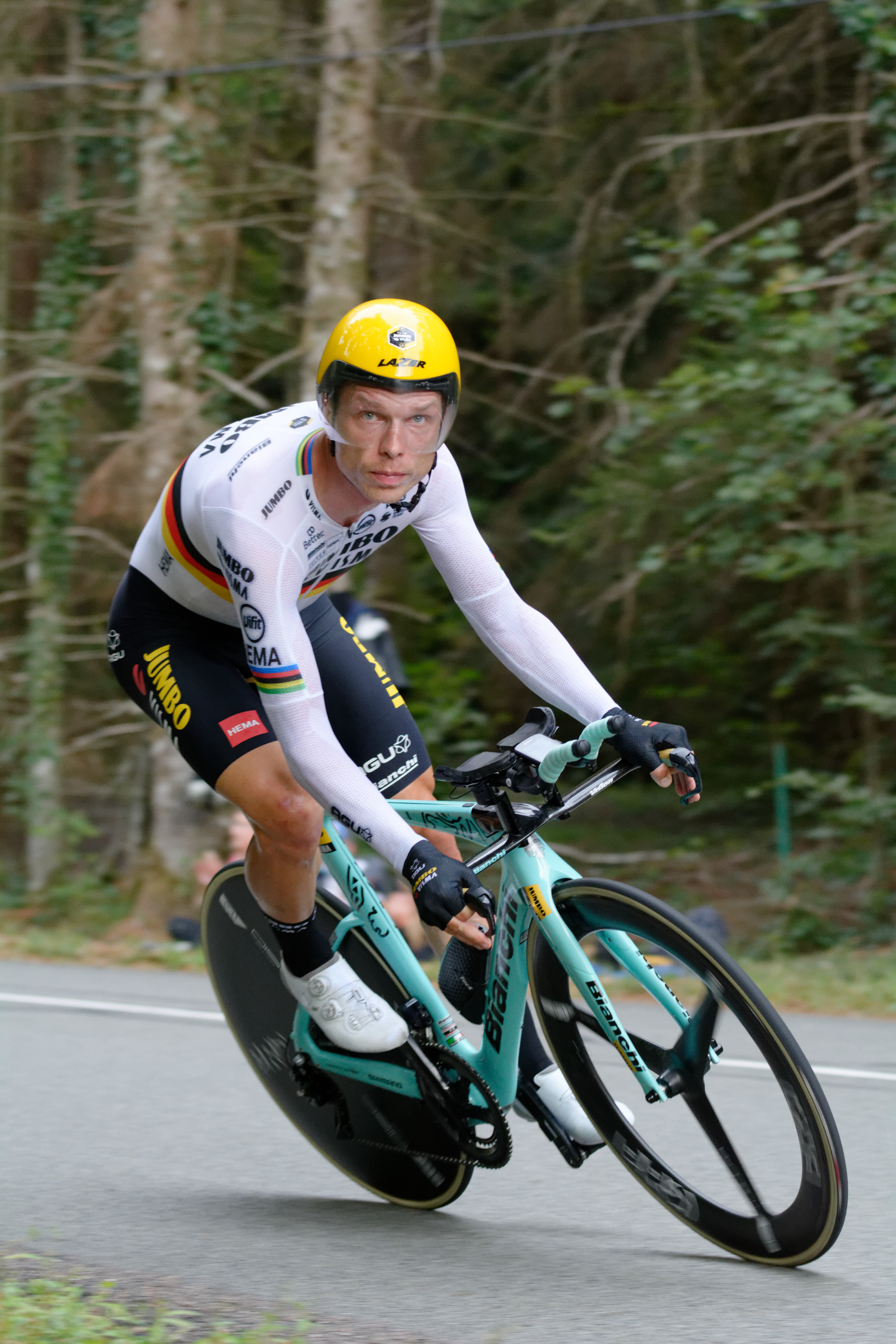
Martin at the 2020 Tour de France

Martin joined Team Jumbo–Visma for the 2019 season, following two years at Team Katusha–Alpecin which he described as a "wasteland", and was primarily utilised as a domestique. He formed part of winning team time trial stage efforts at the UAE Tour and the Tour de France, either side of another German National Time Trial Championships victory. He was later disqualified from the Tour de France following an incident with Team INEOS rider Luke Rowe on stage 17, who was also disqualified from the race for his retaliation. At the UCI Road World Championships, Martin formed part of the German team that won a silver medal in the inaugural mixed team relay (consisting of three men and three women), which replaced the trade team time trial.

After Martin failed to record any top-ten finishes during the 2020 season, which was affected by the COVID-19 pandemic, he won the German National Time Trial Championships for its ninth consecutive edition in 2021, as the 2020 running was not held. At the Tour de France, Martin was involved in an incident with around 45 kilometres (28 miles) remaining on the opening stage; leading the peloton, Martin impacted a cardboard sign that was being held by a spectator at the side of the road, and was one of many riders to fall to the ground. Martin later abandoned the race after a further crash on the eleventh stage, which resulted in him ending up in a ditch. The spectator that caused the stage 1 crash was later fined €1200 for her actions, in court in Brest. In September, Martin announced that he would retire following the UCI Road World Championships, as an after effect of his Tour de France crashes and additional safety concerns. In his final race, he helped the German team win the mixed team relay, 13 seconds ahead of the Dutch team.

== Personal life ==
Martin is the father of two daughters. In 2022, Martin auctioned off his Olympic silver medal to raise money for children during the Russian invasion of Ukraine. The winning bidder of the medal was a German supplements company, FitLine, who returned the medal to Martin. In 2021, Martin was injured in the "Allez Opi-Omi" Tour de France peloton crash causing a pileup after running into a fan's cardboard sign, after which he retired.

== Career achievements ==
=== Major results ===
2003
1st Time trial, National Junior Road Championships
8th Time trial, UCI Junior Road World Championships
2004
1st Team pursuit, National Track Championships
2005 (1 pro win)
Giro delle Regioni

1st Stages 4 & 6

1st Stage 4 (ITT) Regio-Tour
6th Time trial, UEC European Under-23 Road Championships
2006
1st Time trial, National Under-23 Road Championships
1st Overall Thüringen Rundfahrt der U23
3rd Overall Mainfranken-Tour
6th Road race, UEC European Under-23 Road Championships
2007
1st Overall FBD Insurance Rás

1st Young rider classification

1st Coppa Città di Asti
2nd Overall Thüringen Rundfahrt der U23

1st Stage 1

2nd Overall Tour de l'Avenir
7th Overall Circuit des Ardennes

1st Stage 3 (ITT)

2008 (4)
1st Hel van het Mergelland
1st Stage 3b (ITT) Tour de l'Ain
1st Stage 8 (ITT) Deutschland Tour
1st Prologue Ster Elektrotoer
3rd Time trial, National Road Championships
3rd Overall Sachsen Tour
7th Time trial, UCI Road World Championships
2009 (3)
1st Mountains classification, Paris–Nice
1st Stage 3 (ITT) Critérium International
1st Stage 4 (ITT) Bayern Rundfahrt
2nd Time trial, National Road Championships
2nd Overall Tour de Suisse

1st Mountains classification
1st Stage 8

3rd Time trial, UCI Road World Championships
7th Overall Volta ao Algarve
7th Clásica de Almería
8th Overall Tour de Romandie

1st Stage 3 (TTT)

Tour de France

Held after Stages 3–14
Combativity award Stage 20

2010 (5)
1st Time trial, National Road Championships
1st Overall Eneco Tour

1st Young rider classification
1st Stage 7 (ITT)

1st Stage 7 (ITT) Tour of California
3rd Time trial, UCI Road World Championships
6th Overall Tour de Suisse

1st Stage 9 (ITT)

Tour de France

Held after Stages 1–3

2011 (12)
1st Time trial, UCI Road World Championships
1st Overall Paris–Nice

1st Stage 6 (ITT)

1st Overall Volta ao Algarve

1st Stage 5 (ITT)

1st Overall Tour of Beijing

1st Stage 1 (ITT)

1st Chrono des Nations
1st Stage 6 (ITT) Tour of the Basque Country
1st Stage 20 (ITT) Tour de France
1st Stage 10 (ITT) Vuelta a España
1st Stage 3 (ITT) Critérium du Dauphiné
2nd Time trial, National Road Championships
2nd Overall Tour de Romandie
5th UCI World Tour
5th Trofeo Deià
2012 (7)
UCI Road World Championships

1st Time trial
1st Team time trial

1st Time trial, National Road Championships
1st Overall Tour of Belgium

1st Stage 4 (ITT)

1st Overall Tour of Beijing

1st Stage 2

1st Chrono des Nations
2nd Time trial, Olympic Games
2nd Overall Volta ao Algarve
4th Eschborn–Frankfurt – Rund um den Finanzplatz
5th Overall Tour of the Basque Country
2013 (12)
UCI Road World Championships

1st Time trial
1st Team time trial

1st Time trial, National Road Championships
1st Overall Volta ao Algarve

1st Stage 4 (ITT)

1st Overall Tour of Belgium

1st Stage 3 (ITT)

1st Chrono des Nations
Tirreno–Adriatico

1st Stages 1 (TTT) & 7 (ITT)

1st Stage 6 (ITT) Tour of the Basque Country
1st Stage 5 (ITT) Tour de Romandie
1st Stage 4 (ITT) Critérium du Dauphiné
1st Stage 11 (ITT) Tour de France
6th Overall Tour of Beijing
8th Trofeo Serra de Tramuntana
Combativity award Stage 6 Vuelta a España
2014 (10)
1st Time trial, National Road Championships
1st Overall Tour of Belgium

1st Stage 3 (ITT)

Tour de France

1st Stages 9 & 20 (ITT)
Held after Stage 9
Combativity award Stages 9 & 10

Vuelta a España

1st Stage 10 (ITT)
Combativity award Stage 10

Tour of the Basque Country

1st Stages 2 & 6 (ITT)

1st Stage 1 (TTT) Tirreno–Adriatico
UCI Road World Championships

2nd Time trial
3rd Team time trial

4th Overall Dubai Tour
4th Overall Tour de Suisse

1st Stages 1 (ITT) & 7 (ITT)

2015 (5)
1st Time trial, National Road Championships
1st Overall Tour du Poitou-Charentes
Tour de France

1st Stage 4
Held after Stages 4–6

1st Stage 3 (ITT) Volta ao Algarve
1st Stage 6 (ITT) Tour de Romandie
UCI Road World Championships

2nd Team time trial
7th Time trial

2016 (3)
UCI Road World Championships

1st Time trial
1st Team time trial

1st Time trial, National Road Championships
1st Stage 7a (ITT) Tour of Britain
4th Overall Three Days of De Panne
Combativity award Stage 16 Tour de France
2017 (2)
1st Time trial, National Road Championships
1st Stage 2 Volta a la Comunitat Valenciana
3rd Overall Tour of Belgium
8th Overall Tour of Britain
9th Time trial, UCI Road World Championships
2018 (1)
1st Time trial, National Road Championships
7th Time trial, UCI Road World Championships
2019 (1)
1st Time trial, National Road Championships
1st Stage 2 (TTT) Tour de France
1st Stage 1 (TTT) UAE Tour
UCI Road World Championships

2nd Team relay
9th Time trial

2021 (1)
UCI Road World Championships

1st Team relay
6th Time trial

1st Time trial, National Road Championships

==== Grand Tour general classification results timeline ====
Grand Tour general classification results
Grand Tour	2008	2009	2010	2011	2012	2013	2014	2015	2016	2017	2018	2019	2020	2021
Giro d'Italia	128	—	—	—	—	—	—	—	—	—	110	—	DNF	—
Tour de France	—	35	137	44	DNF	106	47	DNF	DNF	101	DNF	DSQ	118	DNF
Vuelta a España	—	—	—	DNF	DNF	DNF	DNF	—	—	—	—	DNF	—	—
Major stage race general classification results
Race	2008	2009	2010	2011	2012	2013	2014	2015	2016	2017	2018	2019	2020	2021
Paris–Nice	—	85	DNF	1	62	—	—	38	—	93	—	—	—	DNF
Tirreno–Adriatico	—	—	—	—	—	29	75	—	117	—	47	135	—	—
Volta a Catalunya	—	—	92	—	—	—	—	—	—	—	—	—	NH	—
Tour of the Basque Country	—	—	—	107	5	60	30	32	—	—	—	DNF	NH	—
Tour de Romandie	94	8	—	2	—	11	83	30	—	—	—	80	NH	89
Critérium du Dauphiné	—	—	—	37	23	DNF	—	DNF	65	90	—	—	DNF	106
Tour de Suisse	—	2	6	—	—	—	4	—	—	—	—	—	NH	—

==== Major championships timeline ====
Event		2008	2009	2010	2011	2012	2013	2014	2015	2016	2017	2018	2019	2020	2021
Olympic Games	Time trial	—	Not held			2	Not held			12	Not held				—
Olympic Games	Road race	—	Not held			DNF	Not held			DNF	Not held				—
World Championships	Time trial	7	3	3	1	1	1	2	7	1	9	7	9	—	6
World Championships	Road race	—	DNF	DNF	166	—	—	DNF	88	DNF	69	—	—	—	—
World Championships	Team time trial (Note: From 2012 to 2016, Martin was part of the Omega Pharma–Quick-Step/Etixx–Quick-Step team that contested the race. In 2017 and 2018, he contested the event with Team Katusha–Alpecin.)	Not held				1	1	3	2	1	9	11	Not held		
World Championships	Mixed team relay	Did not exist											2	NH	1
National Championships	Time trial	3	2	1	2	1	1	1	1	1	1	1	1	NH	1
National Championships	Road race	14	—	4	68	—	39	50	—	124	—	160	—	—	—

Legend
—	Did not compete
DNF	Did not finish
DSQ	Disqualified
NH	Not held

=== Awards ===
- German Male Cyclist of the Year (German: Radsportler des Jahres für Männer): 2009, 2011, 2016
- Thüringia Sportsperson of the Year (German: Thüringer Sportler des Jahres): 2012
