= Koos Moerenhout =

Dutch cyclist (born 1973)

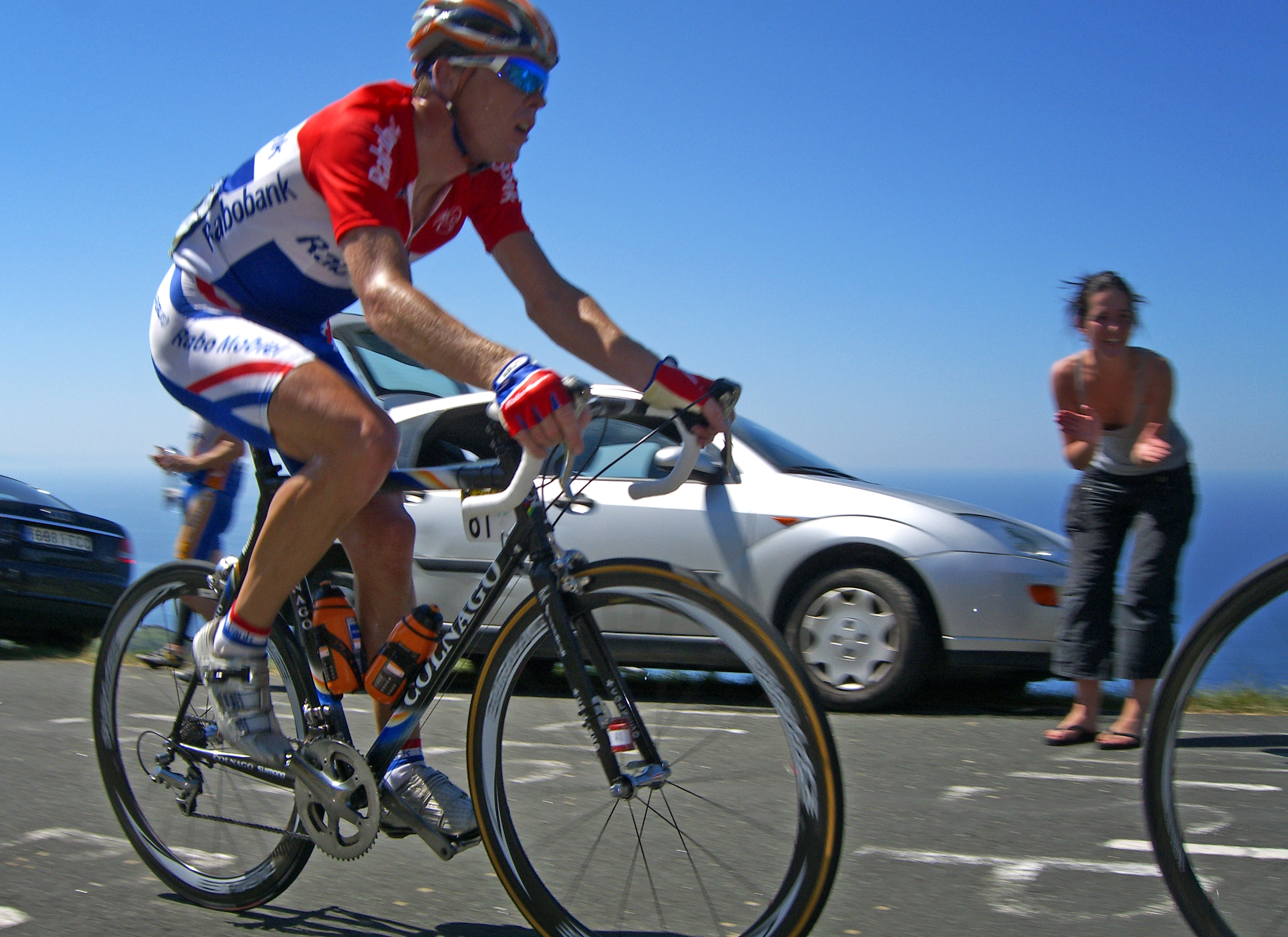
- Moerenhout during the 2007 Clásica de San Sebastián

Personal information
- Full name: Jacobus Moerenhout
- Nickname: Jake
- Born: 5 November 1973 (age 52) Achthuizen, the Netherlands
- Height: 1.84 m (6 ft 0 in)
- Weight: 74 kg (163 lb)

Cycling career
- Sport: Cycling
- Discipline: Road
- Role: Rider

Professional teams
- 1996–1999: Rabobank
- 2000–2002: Domo-Farm Frites
- 2003–2005: Lotto–Domo
- 2006: Phonak
- 2007–2010: Rabobank

Major wins
- Dutch National Road Race Champion (2007, 2009); Circuit Franco-Belge (1996)

Jacobus ("Koos") Moerenhout (born 5 November 1973 in Achthuizen) is a Dutch former professional road bicycle racer. Moerenhout was named as Dutch national coach in 2018 by the Royal Dutch Cycling Union (KNWU), and the Netherlands won the World Championship, with Mathieu van der Poel in 2023 in Glasgow.

== Major results ==
1994
1st, Overall, Tour de Liège
1996
1st, Overall, Circuit Franco-Belge

Winner Stage 1
Winner Points Competition

1st, Dokkum Woudenomloop
1997
1st, Stage 8, Rheinland-Pfalz Rundfahrt

Winner Mountain Competition

1998
1st, Profronde van Oostvoorne
1999
1st, Stage 4, Tour of the Basque Country

Winner Mountain Competition

2000
1st, Stage 1, Tour Down Under
1st, Steenwijk
2nd, National Road Race Championship
2003
1st, Stage 4, Rheinland-Pfalz Rundfahrt
2004
1st, Izegem
2nd, National Road Race Championship
2005
12th, Vuelta a España
2006
1st, Zevenbergen & Geleen
2007
(Netherlands) Dutch National Road Race Championship
1st, Acht van Chaam
2009
(Netherlands) Dutch National Road Race Championship
1st, Stage 7, Tour of Austria
2010
1st, Stage 3, Eneco Tour

=== General classification results timeline ===
Grand Tour general classification results
Grand Tour	1997	1998	1999	2000	2001	2002	2003	2004	2005	2006	2007	2008	2009	2010
Giro d'Italia	-	-	-	-	-	-	52	-	-	-	70	-	-	-
Tour de France	-	44	-	77	-	-	128	100	-	61	-	32	-	52
Vuelta a España	65	-	-	-	-	72	-	-	14	-	42	-	36	-

== See also ==
- List of Dutch Olympic cyclists

Sporting positions
Preceded by Michael Boogerd; Lars Boom	Dutch National Road Race Champion; 2007; 2009	Succeeded by Lars Boom; Niki Terpstra
