= Bert Grabsch =

German cyclist (born 1975)

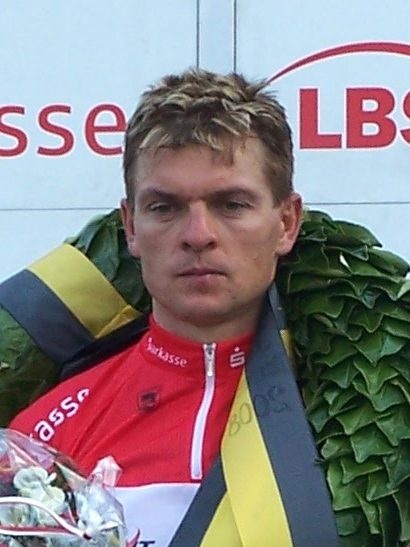
- Grabsch at the 2008 Sachsen Tour

Personal information
- Full name: Bert Grabsch
- Born: 19 June 1975 (age 51) Wittenberg, East Germany
- Height: 1.79 m (5 ft 10 in)
- Weight: 78 kg (172 lb)

Cycling career
- Sport: Cycling
- Current team: Retired
- Role: Rider
- Rider type: Time-Trialist

Amateur team
- 1997–1998: Agro-Adler Brandenburg

Professional teams
- 1999–2000: Team Cologne
- 2001–2006: Phonak
- 2007–2011: T-Mobile Team
- 2012–2013: Omega Pharma–Quick-Step

Major wins
- Grand Tours Vuelta a España 1 individual stage (2007) One-day races and Classics World Time Trial Championships (2008) National Time Trial Championships (2007, 2008, 2009, 2011)
Medal record
Men's road bicycle racing
Representing Germany
World Championships
Gold medal – first place	2008 Varese	Elite Men's Time Trial

Bert Grabsch (born 19 June 1975) is a German former road bicycle racer, who raced as a professional between 1999 and 2013. He was born in Wittenberg and is the younger brother of fellow road racing cyclist Ralf Grabsch. He is a former UCI time trial world champion, having won the title in Varese, Italy on 25 September 2008.

He competed at the 2008 Beijing Olympic Games in the Individual Road Race, which he did not finish, and Individual Time Trial, where he finished thirteenth. In the same events at the 2012 Summer Olympics, he finished 95th in the road race and 8th in the time trial.

Grabsch retired at the end of the 2013 season, after fifteen years as a professional.

== Career achievements ==
=== Major results ===
1998
1st Stage 4 Regio-Tour
9th Overall Vuelta Ciclista de Chile
1999
1st Stage 5 Regio-Tour
6th Overall Niedersachsen-Rundfahrt
9th Overall Deutschland Tour
2000
1st Hel van het Mergelland
3rd Overall Niedersachsen-Rundfahrt
3rd Stadsprijs Geraardsbergen
4th Rund um den Henninger Turm
5th GP Rudy Dhaenens
7th Overall Rheinland-Pfalz Rundfahrt
10th Overall Peace Race
2001
2nd Rund um Köln
2nd Giro del Mendrisiotto
3rd Grand Prix Eddy Merckx
5th Overall Tour de Wallonie

1st Stage 2

6th Overall Deutschland Tour
7th Overall Niedersachsen-Rundfahrt

1st Stage 5

7th Overall Rheinland-Pfalz Rundfahrt
2002
1st Stage 1 Vuelta a Burgos
10th Rund um Köln
2004
6th LUK Challenge Chrono Bühl
7th Overall Three Days of De Panne
7th Grand Prix Pino Cerami
2005
1st Rund um die Hainleite
2nd Eindhoven Team Time Trial
10th HEW Cyclassics
2007
1st Time trial, National Road Championships
1st Stage 8 (ITT) Vuelta a España
2nd Overall Bayern Rundfahrt
3rd Sparkassen Giro Bochum
2008
1st Time trial, UCI Road World Championships
1st Time trial, National Road Championships
1st Overall Sachsen-Tour

1st Stage 4

1st Stage 6 (ITT) Tour of Austria
2009
1st Time trial, National Road Championships
1st Stage 4 (ITT) Critérium du Dauphiné Libéré
2011
1st Time trial, National Road Championships
1st Stage 7 (ITT) Tour of Austria
5th Overall Three Days of De Panne
2012
2nd Time trial, National Road Championships

=== Grand Tour general classification results timeline ===
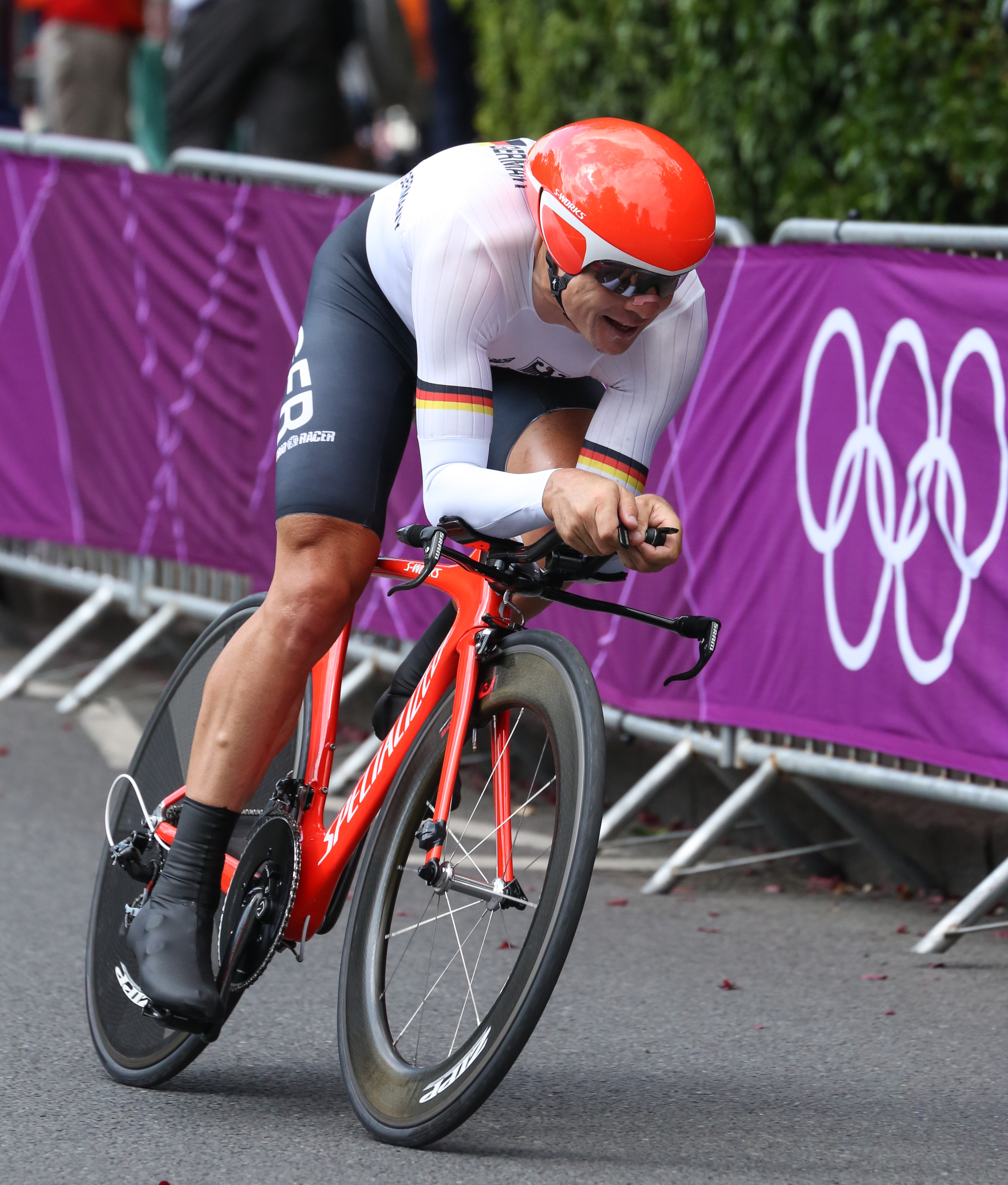
Competing in the 2012 London Olympics Time Trial

Grand Tour	2002	2003	2004	2005	2006	2007	2008	2009	2010	2011	2012
Giro d'Italia	61	—	—	—	—	—	—	—	—	—	—
Tour de France	—	—	81	103	104	105	—	134	169	—	125
/ Vuelta a España	101	88	86	—	—	DNF	—	DNF	—	136	—

Legend
—	Did not compete
DNF	Did not finish

Sporting positions
Preceded by Fabian Cancellara	World Time Trial Champion; 2008	Succeeded by Fabian Cancellara
