= Scandinavian Race Uppsala =

Swedish one-day road cycling race

Scandinavian Race
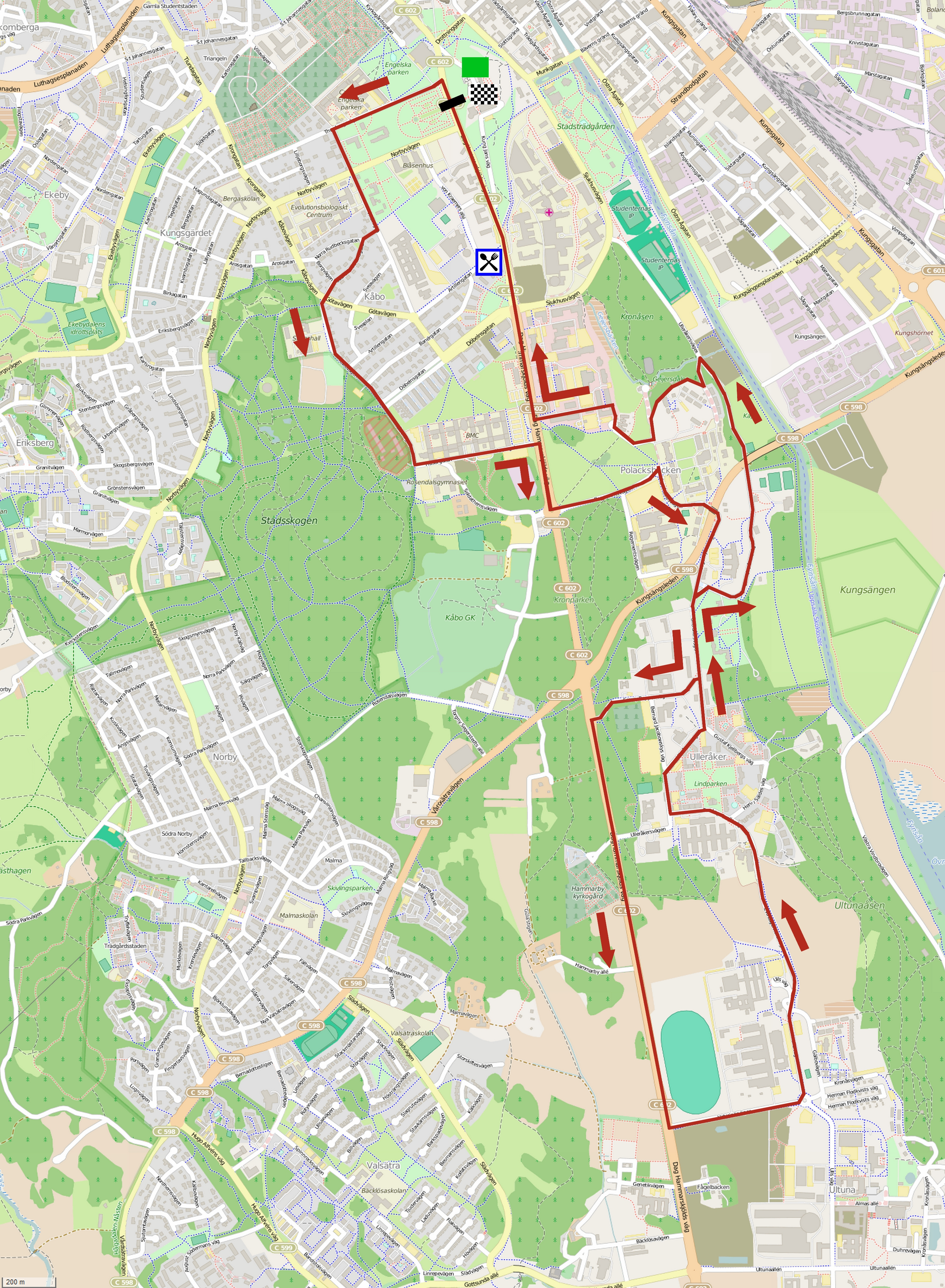

Race details
- Date: Mid May
- Region: Uppsala, Sweden
- English name: Scandinavian Race
- Local name(s): Skandisloppet
- Discipline: Road
- Competition: UCI Europe Tour
- Type: Single-day race
- Web site: www.upsalack.se/eng/

History
- First edition: 1909
- Editions: 114 (as of 2022)
- First winner: Alex Ekström (SWE)
- Most wins: Ragnar Malm (SWE); Henry Hansen (DEN) (6 wins)
- Most recent: Rasmus Bøgh Wallin (DEN)

Scandinavian Race is an annual bicycle road race held in Uppsala, Sweden. Between the years 1909–1937 and 1940–1945 the race was run as a time trial; in 1956 it was held as a team time trial. Since 2008, it is organized as a 1.2 event on the UCI Europe Tour. In 2020 and 2021, due to the COVID-19 pandemic in Sweden, the Scandinavian Race was held as the Swedish National Road Race Championships.

== Winners ==
Year	Country	Rider	Team
1909	Sweden	Alex Ekström	SK Iter
1910	Sweden	Arvid Pettersson	Söderbrunns IS
1911	Sweden	Erik Blomgren	Söderbrunns IS
1912	Sweden	Henrik Morén	SK Iter
1913	Sweden	Karl Landsberg	IFK Örebro
1914	Sweden	Karl Landsberg	IFK Örebro
1915	Sweden	Ragnar Malm	VIF Diana
1916	Sweden	Axel Eriksson	CK Uni
1917	Sweden	Ragnar Malm	VIF Diana
1918	Sweden	Ragnar Malm	IF Thor
1919	Sweden	Ragnar Malm	IF Thor
1920	Sweden	Harry Stenqvist	CK Uni
1921	Sweden	Algot Persson	Hammarby IF
1922	Sweden	Ragnar Malm	IF Thor
1923	Sweden	Sigfrid Lundberg	IF Thor
1924	Sweden	Ragnar Malm	IF Thor
1925	Sweden	Karl Lundberger	Hammarby IF
1926	Denmark	Henry Hansen	DCR
1927	Denmark	Henry Hansen	DCR
1928	Denmark	Henry Hansen	DCR
1929	Denmark	Henry Hansen	DCR
1930	Denmark	Henry Hansen	DCR
1931	Denmark	Henry Hansen	DCR
1932	Sweden	Martin Lundin	CK Uni
1933	Sweden	Bernhard Britz	IFK Enskede
1934	Sweden	Sven Thor	SK Fyrishof
1935	Sweden	Berndt Carlsson	Hammarby IF
1936	Sweden	Ingvar Eriksson	Hammarby IF
1937	Sweden	Martin Lundin	CK Uni
1938	Sweden	Ingvar Eriksson	Hammarby IF
1939	Sweden	Harry Jansson	SK Fyrishof
1940	Sweden	Sven Johansson	Hammarby IF
1941	Sweden	Bengt Malmgren	Hammarby IF
1942	Sweden	Martin Lundin	CK Uni
1943	Sweden	Gunnar Jansson	CK Meteor
1944	Sweden	Erik Törnblom	Västerås IK
1945	Sweden	Halle Janemar	Upsala CK
1946	Sweden	Harry Jansson	SK Fyrishof
1947	Sweden	Ingvar Eriksson	CK Wano
1948	Sweden	Sven Johansson	Hammarby IF
1949	Sweden	Yngve Lundh	Bollnäs CK
1950	Sweden	Ingvar Birgersson	SK Fyrishof
1951	Sweden	Sven Johansson	CK Crescent
1952	Sweden	Sven Johansson	Örebro VK
1953	Sweden	Allan Carlsson	Norrköpings CK
1954	Sweden	Arne Tevall	CK Crescent
1955	Denmark	Eluf Dalgaard	Denmark (national team)
1956		Team edition	Denmark (national team)
1957	Sweden	Nils Körberg	Västerås IK
1958	Sweden	Owe Adamson	Kumla CA
1959	Sweden	Göte Sundell	Upsala CK
1960	Sweden	Rune Nilsson	CK Wano
1961	Sweden	Owe Adamson	Upsala CK
1962	Sweden	Owe Adamson	Upsala CK
1963	Sweden	Göte Sundell	Upsala CK
1964	Sweden	Göran Wagman	Albano CK
1965	Sweden	Jupp Ripfel	CK Falken
1966	Sweden	Paul Munther	Upsala CK
1967	Sweden	Gösta Pettersson	Vårgårda CK
1968	Sweden	Bo Anderberg	Brahelunds IK
1969	Sweden	Jupp Ripfel	CK Falken
1970	Sweden	Sune Wennlöf	CK Centrum
1971	Sweden	Roine Grönlund	Falu CK
1972	Sweden	Mats Mikiver	CK Antilopen
1973	Sweden	Lars Gustafsson	Västerås IK
1974	Sweden	Ronnie Carlsson	Kumla CA
1975	Sweden	Alf Segersäll	Fagersta CA
1976	Norway	Svein Langholm	Norway (national team)
1977	Sweden	Bernt Scheler	Burseryds IF
1978	Sweden	Thomas Eriksson	Örebrocyklisterna
1979	Finland	Sixten Wackström	Akilles
1980	Sweden	Per Christiansson	IK Vinco
1981	Sweden	Per Christiansson	IK Vinco
1982	Sweden	Juha Narkiniemi	Upsala CK
1983	Sweden	Bengt Asplund	Kumla CA
1984	Sweden	Håkan Larsson	Södertälje CK
1985	Sweden	Anders Johansson	Tranemo IF
1986	Sweden	Raoul Fahlin	Örebrocyklisterna
1987	Sweden	Magnus Knutsson	Nordbanken CK
1988	Sweden	Klas Johansson	CK Master
1989	Sweden	Peter Pegestam	Nordbanken CK
1990	Sweden	Hans Kindberg	Tefteå IF
1991	Sweden	Magnus Knutsson	Nordbanken CK
1992	Sweden	Johan Fredriksson	CK Falken
1993	Sweden	Klas Johansson	CK Ceres
1994	Sweden	Patrik Serra	Team Mälarenergi
1995	Norway	Vegard Øverås-Lied	Norway (national team)
1996	Norway	Vegard Øverås-Lied	Norway (national team)
1997	Sweden	Kristoffer Johansen	Tranemo IF
1998	Poland	Marcin Sapa	Poland (national team)
1999	Sweden	Göran Enström	Gimonäs IF
2000	Sweden	Stefan Adamsson	Team Crescent
2001	Sweden	Magnus Lömäng	Falu CK
2002	Sweden	Tobias Lergård	Team Crescent
2003	Sweden	Fredrik Ericsson	Upsala CK
2004	Sweden	Lucas Persson	Team Mälarenergi
2005	Sweden	Lucas Persson	Team Mälarenergi
2006	Sweden	Lucas Persson	Team Mälarenergi
2007	Sweden	Mattias Westling	Team Cykelcity
2008	Denmark	Morten Høberg	Team Løgstør-Cycling for Health
2009	Denmark	Jonas Aaen Jørgensen	Team Capinordic
2010	Denmark	Philip Nielsen	Concordia Forsikring–Himmerland
2011	Latvia	Andžs Flaksis	Rietumu–Delfin
2012	Sweden	Jonas Ahlstrand	Team CykelCity
2013	Sweden	Alexander Gingsjö	Team People4you–Unaas Cycling
2014	Denmark	Jonas Aaen Jørgensen	Riwal Cycling Team
2015	Denmark	Nicolai Brøchner	Riwal Platform
2016	Norway	Syver Wærsted	Team Ringeriks–Kraft
2017	Denmark	Nicolai Brøchner	Riwal Platform
2018	Norway	Trond Trondsen	Team Coop
2019	Denmark	Rasmus Bøgh Wallin	Riwal Readynez
2020	Sweden	Kim Magnusson	Riwal Securitas
2021	Sweden	Victor Hillerström Rundh	CK Hymer
2022	Denmark	Rasmus Bøgh Wallin	Restaurant Suri–Carl Ras
