= 2021 UCI Road World Championships – Women's road race =

Cycling race

Women's road race
2021 UCI Road World Championships
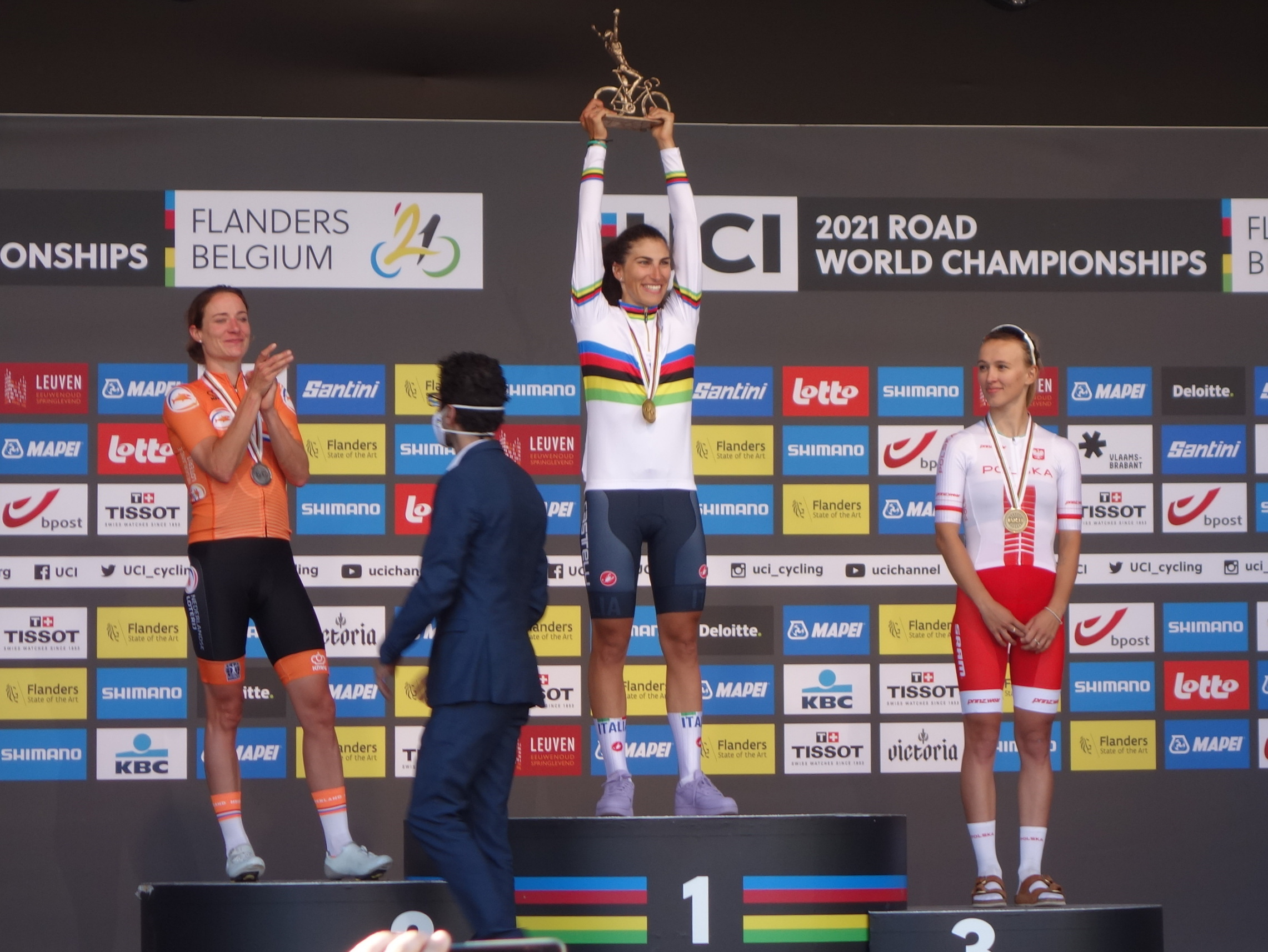
- Podium of the women's road race

Race details
- Dates: 25 September 2021
- Stages: 1 in Leuven, Belgium
- Distance: 157.7 km (98.0 mi)
- Winning time: 3h 52' 27"

Medalists
	Gold	(Italy) Elisa Balsamo (ITA)
	Silver	(Netherlands) Marianne Vos (NED)
	Bronze	(Poland) Katarzyna Niewiadoma (POL)

The Women's road race of the 2021 UCI Road World Championships was a cycling event that took place on 25 September 2021 from Antwerp to Leuven, Belgium. Anna van der Breggen of the Netherlands was the defending champion.

The race was won by Italian Elisa Balsamo in a bunch sprint ahead of three-time world champion Marianne Vos from the Netherlands, and Katarzyna Niewiadoma from Poland.

== Qualification ==
Qualification was based mainly on the UCI World Ranking by nations as of 17 August 2021.

=== UCI World Rankings ===
The following nations qualified.

Criterium	Rank	Number of riders		Nations
Criterium	Rank	To enter	To start	Nations
UCI World Ranking by Nations	1-5		7	Netherlands; Italy; Denmark; Germany; Australia
UCI World Ranking by Nations	6-14		6	Belgium; United States; Great Britain; South Africa; Poland; Switzerland; France; Spain; Norway; Russian Cycling Federation
UCI World Ranking by Nations	15-19		5	New Zealand; Austria; Sweden; Slovenia; Colombia
UCI World Ranking by Individuals (if not already qualified)	1–200	2	1	—N/a

=== Continental champions ===
Name	Country	Reason
Anna Kiesenhofer	Austria	Olympic Champion
Anna van der Breggen	Netherlands	Outgoing World Champion
Carla Oberholzer	South Africa	African Champion
Lina Hernández	Colombia	Pan American Champion

== Final classification ==
Of the race's 162 entrants, 117 riders completed the full distance of 157.7 kilometres (98.0 mi).

Rank	Rider	Country	Time
1	Elisa Balsamo	Italy	3h 52' 27"
2	Marianne Vos	Netherlands	+ 0"
3	Katarzyna Niewiadoma	Poland	+ 1"
4	Kata Blanka Vas	Hungary	+ 1"
5	Arlenis Sierra	Cuba	+ 1"
6	Alison Jackson	Canada	+ 1"
7	Demi Vollering	Netherlands	+ 1"
8	Cecilie Uttrup Ludwig	Denmark	+ 1"
9	Lisa Brennauer	Germany	+ 1"
10	Coryn Rivera	United States	+ 1"
11	Ashleigh Moolman	South Africa	+ 1"
12	Alena Amialiusik	Belarus	+ 1"
13	Elise Chabbey	Switzerland	+ 1"
14	Elizabeth Deignan	United Kingdom	+ 1"
15	Sina Frei	Switzerland	+ 1"
16	Lotte Kopecky	Belgium	+ 1"
17	Elisa Longo Borghini	Italy	+ 1"
18	Ellen van Dijk	Netherlands	+ 8"
19	Annemiek van Vleuten	Netherlands	+ 8"
20	Marta Cavalli	Italy	+ 15"
21	Ruth Winder	United States	+ 17"
22	Marta Bastianelli	Italy	+ 17"
23	Maria Giulia Confalonieri	Italy	+ 29"
24	Rachel Neylan	Australia	+ 45"
25	Anna Henderson	United Kingdom	+ 49"
26	Ella Harris	New Zealand	+ 49"
27	Audrey Cordon-Ragot	France	+ 49"
28	Špela Kern	Slovenia	+ 50"
29	Mavi García	Spain	+ 50"
30	Amy Pieters	Netherlands	+ 50"
31	Karol-Ann Canuel	Canada	+ 50"
32	Chantal van den Broek-Blaak	Netherlands	+ 50"
33	Christine Majerus	Luxembourg	+ 50"
34	Jolien D'Hoore	Belgium	+ 1' 21"
35	Pfeiffer Georgi	United Kingdom	+ 1' 21"
36	Lucinda Brand	Netherlands	+ 3' 01"
37	Franziska Koch	Germany	+ 3' 29"
38	Sarah Roy	Australia	+ 3' 31"
39	Ane Santesteban	Spain	+ 3' 31"
40	Anna Shackley	United Kingdom	+ 3' 31"
41	Tiffany Cromwell	Australia	+ 3' 31"
42	Paula Patiño	Colombia	+ 3' 31"
43	Hanna Nilsson	Sweden	+ 3' 31"
44	Omer Shapira	Israel	+ 3' 31"
45	Aude Biannic	France	+ 3' 34"
46	Juliette Labous	France	+ 3' 34"
47	Anne Dorthe Ysland	Norway	+ 6' 23"
48	Jesse Vandenbulcke	Belgium	+ 7' 31"
49	Eugénie Duval	France	+ 7' 31"
50	Évita Muzic	France	+ 7' 31"
51	Karolina Kumiega	Poland	+ 7' 31"
52	Kristen Faulkner	United States	+ 8' 22"
53	Marta Lach	Poland	+ 8' 50"
54	Rasa Leleivytė	Lithuania	+ 8' 50"
55	Eider Merino	Spain	+ 8' 55"
56	Leah Thomas	United States	+ 9' 13"
57	Hanna Solovey	Ukraine	+ 9' 13"
58	Eugenia Bujak	Slovenia	+ 9' 13"
59	Shari Bossuyt	Belgium	+ 9' 13"
60	Jarmila Machačová	Czech Republic	+ 9' 13"
61	Hayley Preen	South Africa	+ 9' 13"
62	Noemi Rüegg	Switzerland	+ 9' 13"
63	Leah Kirchmann	Canada	+ 9' 13"
64	Michaela Drummond	New Zealand	+ 9' 13"
65	Amalie Dideriksen	Denmark	+ 9' 13"
66	Lisa Klein	Germany	+ 9' 13"
67	Sarah Rijkes	Austria	+ 9' 13"
68	Marta Jaskulska	Poland	+ 9' 13"
69	Sara Martín	Spain	+ 9' 13"
70	Anastasiya Kolesava	Belarus	+ 9' 13"
71	Tayler Wiles	United States	+ 9' 13"
72	Aurela Nerlo	Poland	+ 9' 13"
73	Nathalie Eklund	Sweden	+ 9' 13"
74	Kathrin Hammes	Germany	+ 9' 13"
75	Susanne Andersen	Norway	+ 9' 13"
76	Valerie Demey	Belgium	+ 9' 13"
77	Lourdes Oyarbide	Spain	+ 9' 13"
78	Ingvild Gåskjenn	Norway	+ 9' 13"
79	Julie Leth	Denmark	+ 9' 13"
80	Stine Borgli	Norway	+ 9' 13"
81	Sheyla Gutiérrez	Spain	+ 9' 13"
82	Emma Norsgaard	Denmark	+ 9' 13"
83	Katrine Aalerud	Norway	+ 9' 13"
84	Alice Barnes	United Kingdom	+ 9' 13"
85	Eri Yonamine	Japan	+ 9' 13"
86	Rotem Gafinovitz	Israel	+ 9' 13"
87	Romy Kasper	Germany	+ 9' 25"
88	Lea Lin Teutenberg	Germany	+ 9' 25"
89	Anna van der Breggen	Netherlands	+ 9' 30"
90	Marlen Reusser	Switzerland	+ 9' 30"
91	Niamh Fisher-Black	New Zealand	+ 9' 30"
92	Lauretta Hanson	Australia	+ 9' 30"
93	Amanda Spratt	Australia	+ 9' 30"
94	Vittoria Guazzini	Italy	+ 9' 30"
95	Elena Cecchini	Italy	+ 9' 30"
96	Marita Jensen	Denmark	+ 13' 21"
97	Karolina Karasiewicz	Poland	+ 13' 21"
98	Diana Peñuela	Colombia	+ 13' 21"
99	Lizbeth Salazar	Mexico	+ 13' 21"
100	Phetdarin Somrat	Thailand	+ 13' 21"
101	Julia Borgström	Sweden	+ 13' 21"
102	Trine Holmsgaard	Denmark	+ 13' 21"
103	Daniela Campos	Portugal	+ 13' 21"
104	Christina Schweinberger	Austria	+ 13' 21"
105	Caroline Baur	Switzerland	+ 13' 21"
106	Lauren Stephens	United States	+ 13' 21"
107	Valeriya Kononenko	Ukraine	+ 13' 21"
108	Dana Rožlapa	Latvia	+ 13' 21"
109	Roxane Fournier	France	+ 13' 21"
110	Jelena Erić	Serbia	+ 13' 21"
111	Jessica Allen	Australia	+ 13' 21"
112	Frances Janse van Rensburg	South Africa	+ 18' 47
113	Yuliia Biriukova	Ukraine	+ 18' 47
114	Yanina Kuskova	Uzbekistan	+ 18' 47
115	Inga Češulienė	Lithuania	+ 18' 47
116	Nina Berton	Luxembourg	+ 22' 01"
117	Yeny Lorena Colmenares	Colombia	+ 22' 01"

Rank	Rider	Country	Time
	Joss Lowden	United Kingdom	DNF
	Henrietta Christie	New Zealand	DNF
	Chloe Hosking	Australia	DNF
	Kim de Baat	Belgium	DNF
	Kathrin Schweinberger	Austria	DNF
	Verena Eberhardt	Austria	DNF
	Teniel Campbell	Trinidad and Tobago	DNF
	Fernanda Yapura	Argentina	DNF
	Urška Žigart	Slovenia	DNF
	Maria Martins	Portugal	DNF
	Lina Hernández	Colombia	DNF
	Erika Botero	Colombia	DNF
	Nicole Koller	Switzerland	DNF
	Kerry Jonker	South Africa	DNF
	Sara Penton	Sweden	DNF
	Paola Muñoz	Chile	DNF
	Tiffany Keep	South Africa	DNF
	Aidi Gerde Tuisk	Estonia	DNF
	Valentine Nzayisenga	Rwanda	DNF
	Tereza Medveďová	Slovakia	DNF
	Chaniporn Batriya	Thailand	DNF
	Bríet Kristý	Iceland	DNF
	Desiet Kidane	Eritrea	DNF
	Urška Bravec	Slovenia	DNF
	Caroline Andersson	Sweden	DNF
	Agua Marina Espínola	Paraguay	DNF
	Tamara Dronova	Russian Cycling Federation	DNF
	Shaknoza Abdullaeva	Uzbekistan	DNF
	Liane Lippert	Germany	DNF
	Emilie Moberg	Norway	DNF
	Megan Armitage	Ireland	DNF
	Rebecca Koerner	Denmark	DNF
	Thayná Araújo de Lima	Brazil	DNF
	Agusta Edda Bjornsdóttir	Iceland	DNF
	Courteney Webb	South Africa	DNF
	Luciana Roland	Argentina	DNF
	Bisrat Gebremeskel	Eritrea	DNF
	Diane Ingabire	Rwanda	DNF
	Kamonrada Khaoplot	Thailand	DNF
	Elín Björg Björnsdóttir	Iceland	DNF
	Ayan Khankishiyeva	Azerbaijan	DNF
	Anna Kulikova	Uzbekistan	DNF
	Lina Svarinska	Latvia	DNF
	Stephanie Subercaseaux	Chile	DNF
	Adyam Tesfalem	Eritrea	DNF
