= Swedish National Time Trial Championships =

National road cycling championship in Sweden

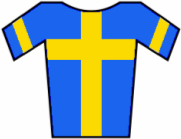

The Swedish National Time Trial Championships have been held since 1909.

== Men ==
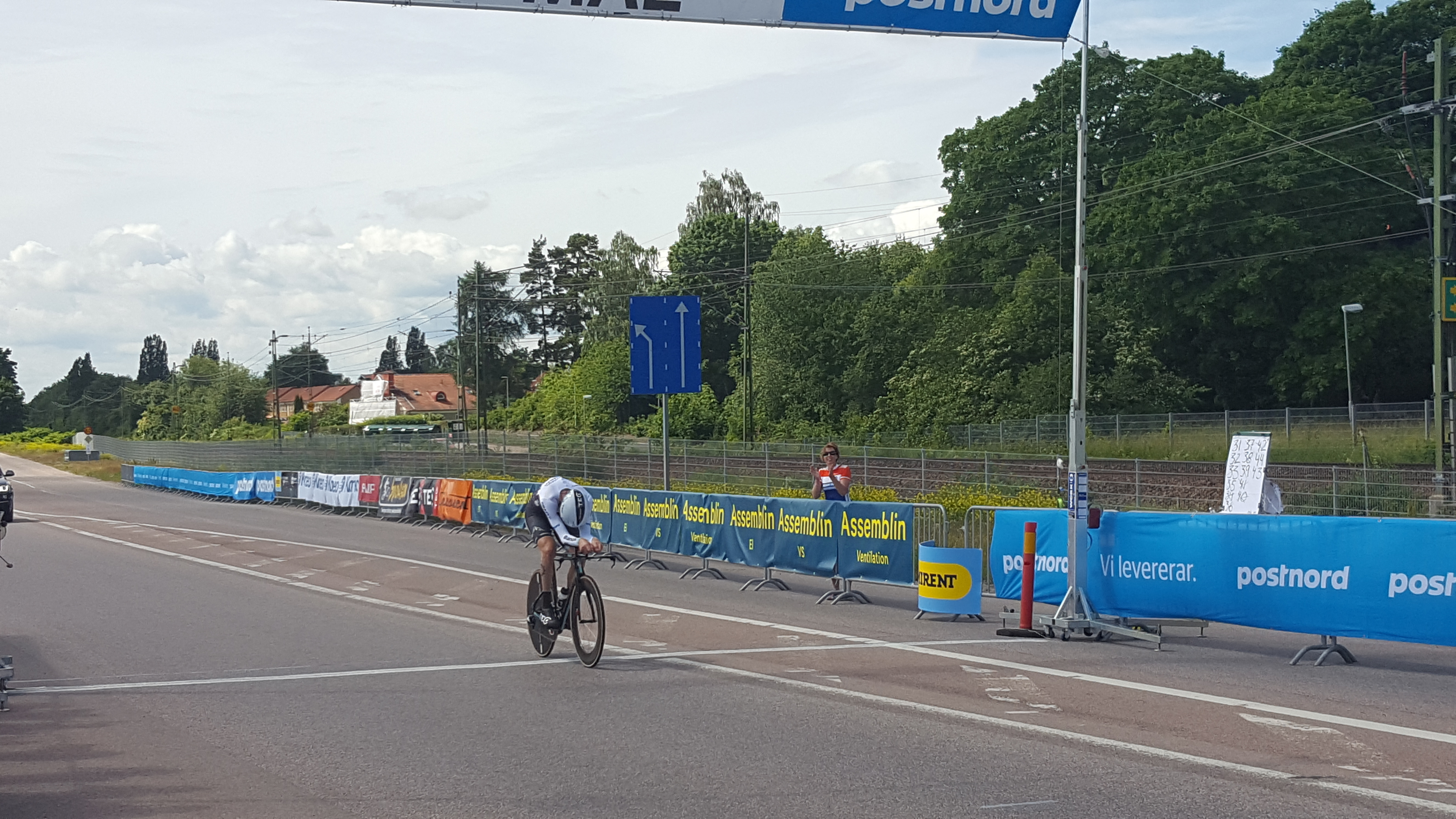
Alexander Wetterhall passes the finish line as winner of the championships in 2016.

Year	Gold	Silver	Bronze
1909	Hjalmar Levin	-	-
1910	Gustav Ericsson	-	-
1911	Axel Persson	-	-
1912	Axel Persson	-	-
1913	Axel Persson	-	-
1915	Harry Stenqvist	-	-
1916	John Gustavsson	-	-
1918	Ragnar Malm	-	-
1919	Axel Persson	-	-
1920	Harry Stenqvist	-	-
1921	Arthur Bjurberg	-	-
1922	Arthur Bjurberg	-	-
1923	Arthur Bjurberg	-	-
1925	Arthur Bjurberg	-	-
1926	Karl Lundberger	-	-
1927	Karl Lundberger	-	-
1928	Folke Nilsson	-	-
1929	Nils Holmqvist	-	-
1930	Sven Thor	-	-
1931	Sven Thor	Bernhard Britz	Gustaf Svensson
1932	Sven Thor	-	-
1933	Gustaf Svensson	-	-
1934	Gustaf Svensson	-	-
1935	Berndt Carlsson	-	-
1936	Berndt Carlsson	-	-
1937	Sven Johansson	-	-
1938	Sven Johansson	-	-
1939	Åke Seyffarth	-	-
1940	Åke Seyffarth	-	-
1941	Sven Johansson	-	-
1942	Arvid Adamsson	-	-
1943	Åke Seyffarth	Karl Erik Söderström	Uno Karlsson
1944	Harald Janemar	Arvid Adamsson	Harry Snell
1945	Harry Snell	Arvid Adamsson	Harald Janemar
1946	Åke Olivestedt	Sven Johansson	Yngve Lundh
1947	Sven Johansson	Hans Iwar	Arvid Adamsson
1948	Arvid Adamsson	Yngve Lundh	Sven Johansson
1949	Alan Carlsson	Arvid Adamsson	Nils Johansson
1950	Sven Johansson	Olle Wänlund	Arvid Adamsson
1951	Stig Mårtensson	John Wickström	Lars Nordwall
1952	Stig Mårtensson	Evert Lindgren	Lars Nordwall
1953	Martin Sjökvist	Gunnar Lindgren	Stig Mårtensson
1954	Lars Nordwall	Evert Lindgren	Gunnar Lindgren
1955	Lars Nordwall	Stig Mårtensson	Sven Johansson
1956	Herbert Dahlbom	Gunnar Lindgren	Gunnar Göransson
1957	Herbert Dahlbom	-	-
1958	Herbert Dahlbom	-	-
1959	Sune Hansson	-	-
1960	Herbert Dahlbom	-	-
1962	Gösta Pettersson	-	-
1963	Gösta Pettersson	-	-
1964	Gösta Pettersson	-	-
1965	Sture Pettersson	-	-
1966	Gösta Pettersson	-	-
1967	Gösta Pettersson	-	-
1968	Tomas Pettersson	-	-
1969	Gösta Pettersson	-	-
1970	Curt Söderlund	-	-
1971	Sten Andersson	-	-
1972	Sten Andersson	-	-
1973	Sten Andersson	-	-
1974	Tord Filipsson	-	-
1975	Tord Filipsson	-	-
1976	Tord Filipsson	-	-
1977	Tord Filipsson	-	-
1978	Bengt Asplund	-	-
1979	Tommy Prim	-	-
1980	Bengt Asplund	-	-
1981	Bengt Asplund	-	-
1982	Bengt Asplund	-	-
1983	Håkan Larsson	-	-
1984	Bengt Asplund	-	-
1985	Magnus Knutsson	-	-
1986	Anders Jarl	-	-
1987	Björn Johansson	-	-
1988	Jan Karlsson	-	-
1989	Jan Karlsson	-	-
1990	Lars Wahlqvist	-	-
1991	Lars Wahlqvist	-	-
1992	Michael Andersson	-	-
1993	Michael Andersson	-	-
1994	Magnus Åström	-	-
1995	Jan Karlsson	-	-
1996	Michael Andersson	-	-
1997	Michael Andersson	-	-
1998	Michael Andersson	-	-
1999	Michael Andersson	-	-
2000	Michael Andersson	Petter Renäng	Martin Rittsel
2001	Jonas Olsson	Gustav Larsson	Tobias Lergard
2002	Jonas Olsson	Gustav Larsson	Martin Rittsel
2003	Magnus Bäckstedt	Jonas Olsson	Thomas Löfkvist
2004	Thomas Löfkvist	Petter Renäng	Fredrik Johansson
2005	Viktor Renäng	Stefan Grahn	Stefan Adamsson
2006	Gustav Larsson	Thomas Löfkvist	Marcus Ljungqvist
2007	Gustav Larsson	Magnus Bäckstedt	Lucas Persson
2008	Fredrik Ericsson	Gustav Larsson	Thomas Löfkvist
2009	Alexander Wetterhall	Fredrik Ericsson	Fredrik Kessiakoff
2010	Gustav Larsson	Sébastien Balck	Fredrik Kessiakoff
2011	Gustav Larsson	Thomas Löfkvist	Alexander Wetterhall
2012	Gustav Larsson	Tobias Ludvigsson	Alexander Wetterhall
2013	Gustav Larsson	Tobias Ludvigsson	Thomas Löfkvist
2014	Alexander Gingsjö	Alexander Wetterhall	Marcus Fåglum
2015	Gustav Larsson	Alexander Wetterhall	Joakim Aleheim
2016	Alexander Wetterhall	Tobias Ludvigsson	Gustav Larsson
2017	Tobias Ludvigsson	Alexander Wetterhall	Hampus Anderberg
2018	Tobias Ludvigsson	Staffan Arvidsson	Hannes Bergström Frisk
2019	Tobias Ludvigsson	Erik Bergström Frisk	Hugo Forssell
2020	Jacob Ahlsson	Tobias Ludvigsson	Hugo Forssell
2021	Hugo Forssell	Jacob Ahlsson	Tobias Ludvigsson
2022	Jacob Ahlsson	Edvin Lovidius	Tobias Ludvigsson
2023	Jacob Ahlsson	Jakob Söderqvist	Hjalmar Klyver

== Women ==
Year	Gold	Silver	Bronze
1971	Elisabet Höglund		
1972	Elisabet Höglund		
1973	Marja-Leena Huhtiniemi		
1974	Anna-Karin Johansson	Marja-Leene Huhtiniemi	Elisabet Hoeglund
1975	Marja-Leena Huhtiniemi	Elisabet Hoeglund	Christel Johansson
1976	Tuulikki Jahre		
1977	Tuulikki Jahre	Ritva Mykkaenen	Anna-Karin Johansson
1978	Anna-Karin Johansson	Tuulikki Jahre	Kristina Ranudd
1979	Tuulikki Jahre		
1980	Tuulikki Jahre		
1981	Maria Johnsson	Tuulikki Jahre	Pia Prim
1982	Maria Johnsson		
1983	Kathrine Lundström		
1984	Marie Höljer		
1985	Christina Vosveld		
1986	Christina Vosveld		
1987	Christina Vosveld		
1988	Christina Vosveld		
1989	Christina Vosveld		
1990	Christina Vosveld		
1991	Marie Höljer		
1992	Christina Vosveld		
1993	Christina Vosveld		
1994	Susanne Ljungskog		
1995	Jenny Algelid	Marie Höljer	Helena Norrman
1996	Jenny Algelid	Susanne Ljungskog	Marie Höljer
1997	Jenny Algelid	Marie Höljer	Susanne Ljungskog
1998	Jenny Algelid	Susanne Ljungskog	Marie Höljer
1999	Jenny Algelid	Susanne Ljungskog	Marie Höljer
2000	Jenny Algelid	Marie Höljer	Annica Jonsson
2001	Madeleine Lindberg	Susanne Ljungskog	Veronica Andrèasson
2002	Jenny Algelid	Susanne Ljungskog	Lotta Green
2003	Susanne Ljungskog	Madeleine Lindberg	Lotta Green
2004	Susanne Ljungskog	Madeleine Lindberg	Lotta Green
2005	Emma Johansson	Monica Holler	Madeleine Lindberg
2006	Susanne Ljungskog	Veronica Andrèasson	Eva Nyström
2007	Emma Johansson	Eva Nyström	Marie Lindberg
2008	Emma Johansson	Dorotea Isaksson	Camilla Larsson
2009	Emilia Fahlin	Susanne Ljungskog	Emma Johansson
2010	Emilia Fahlin	Emma Johansson	Sara Mustonen
2011	Emilia Fahlin	Emma Johansson	Sara Mustonen
2012	Emma Johansson	Malin Rydlund	Emilia Fahlin
2013	Emma Johansson	Lisa Nordén	Malin Rydlund
2014	Emma Johansson	Eva Nyström	Malin Rydlund
2015	Emma Johansson	Sara Mustonen	Hanna Nilsson
2016	Emma Johansson	Emilia Fahlin	Åsa Lundström
2017	Lisa Nordén	Åsa Lundström	Hanna Nilsson
2018	Lisa Nordén	Emilia Fahlin	Frida Knutsson
2019	Lisa Nordén	Nathalie Eklund	Hanna Nilsson
2020	Lisa Nordén	Nathalie Eklund	Emilia Fahlin
2021	Nathalie Eklund	Ebba Granqvist	Hanna Nilsson
2022	Nathalie Eklund	Julia Borgström	Malin Alzén
2023	Jenny Rissveds	Nathalie Eklund	Emilia Fahlin

== See also ==
- Swedish National Road Race Championships
- National Road Cycling Championships
