= Massi–Tactic Women Team =

Spanish cycling team

Massi–Tactic
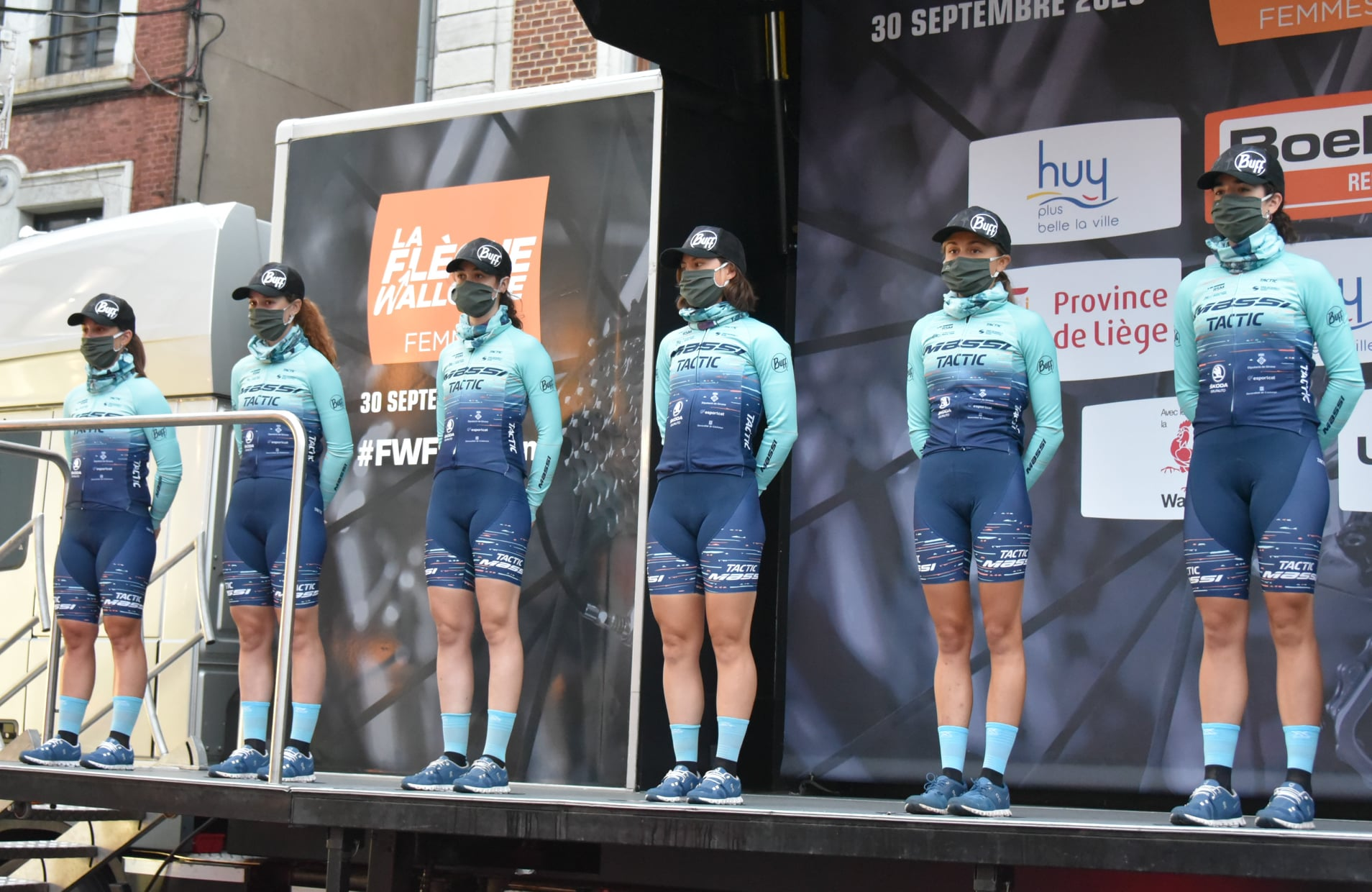

Team information
- UCI code: CAT (2018); MAT (2019–)
- Founded: 2018
- Discipline: Road
- Status: UCI Women's Team (2019); UCI Women's Continental Team (2020–)
- Bicycles: Massi
- Website: Team home page

Key personnel
- General manager: Ángel González
- Team manager: Sergi Güell

Team name history
- 2018 2019–: Catema.cat; Massi–Tactic Women Team

Massi–Tactic Women Team is a professional cycling team which competes in elite road bicycle racing events such as the UCI Women's World Tour. The team was established in 2018, before registering with the UCI for the 2019 season.

== Team roster ==
As of 19 January 2023.

Rider	Date of birth
Jennifer Ducuara (Colombia)	31 January 1996 (age 30)
Elisabet Escursell (Spain)	30 October 1996 (age 29)
Iris Gomez (Spain)	21 October 1986 (age 39)
Estefania Jimenez (Spain)	7 November 2004 (age 21)
Corinna Lechner (Germany)	10 August 1994 (age 32)
Cécile Lejeune (France)	1 February 1988 (age 38)

Rider	Date of birth
Aurela Nerlo (Poland)	11 February 1998 (age 28)
Adèle Normand (Canada)	5 January 2002 (age 24)
Miryam Nuñez (Ecuador)	10 October 1994 (age 31)
Patricia Ortega (Spain)	15 September 1988 (age 37)
Vera Vilaça (Portugal)	17 January 1998 (age 28)
Petra Zsankó (Hungary)	18 February 2001 (age 25)

== Major wins ==
2022
Kringelloppet GP, Nathalie Eklund
Falkenloppet, Nathalie Eklund
Juegos Bolivarianos, Time Trial, Miryam Nuñez
Maarke-Kerkem, Maaike Coljé
Overall Tour of Uppsala, Nathalie Eklund

Stage 3, Nathalie Eklund

Overall Volta a Portugal Feminina Cofidis, Nathalie Eklund

Prologue, Stages 1, 2 & 3, Nathalie Eklund

Stages 1, 2 & 3 Vuelta Femenina Ecuador, Miryam Nuñez

2023
Gran Premio Cidade de Pontevedra, Cécile Lejeune
Int. Braunauer Radsporttage Kriterium, Petra Zsanko
Mühlviertler Hügelwelt Classic, Petra Zsanko
Overall Volta a Portugal Feminina Cofidis, Valeria Valgonen

Prologue & Stage 3, Miryam Nuñez
Stage 4, Valeria Valgonen

== National and continental champions ==
2020
Paraguay Time Trial, Agua Marina Espínola

2021
Norway Road Race, Vita Heine

2022
Sweden Time Trial, Nathalie Eklund

2023
Ecuador Time Trial Miryam Nuñez
Hungary U23 Time Trial Petra Zsankó
