= 1999 UCI Road World Championships – Men's time trial =

Men's Individual Time Trial
1999 UCI Road World Championships
- Rainbow jersey

Race details
- Dates: 1999-10-07 in (Italy) Treviso (ITA)
- Stages: 1
- Distance: 50.8 km (31.57 mi)
- Winning time: 01h 00' 28"

Results
	Winner	Jan Ullrich (GER)	(Germany)
	Second	Michael Andersson (SWE)	(Sweden)
	Third	Chris Boardman (GBR)	(Great Britain)

The Men's Individual Time Trial at the 1999 World Cycling Championships was held on Thursday 7 October 1999 in Treviso, Italy, over a total distance of 50.8 kilometres. There were a total number of 59 starters, with three non-starters.

== Final classification ==
Rank	Rider	Time
1st place, gold medalist(s)	Jan Ullrich (GER)	01:00.28,44
2nd place, silver medalist(s)	Michael Andersson (SWE)	+ 14.09
3rd place, bronze medalist(s)	Chris Boardman (GBR)	+ 58.66
4.	Raivis Belohvoščiks (LAT)	+ 1.04,50
5.	Melcior Mauri (ESP)	+ 1.18,81
6.	Serhiy Honchar (UKR)	+ 1.19,53
7.	Gilles Maignan (FRA)	+ 1.25,40
8.	Erik Dekker (NED)	+ 1.40,59
9.	Jens Voigt (GER)	+ 1.45,11
10.	Alex Zülle (SUI)	+ 1.45,79
11.	Viatcheslav Ekimov (RUS)	+ 1.53,59
12.	Eugen Wacker (KGZ)	+ 2.00,52
13.	Andrey Teteryouk (KAZ)	+ 2.01,34
14.	Álvaro González (ESP)	+ 2.13,31
15.	Marco Velo (ITA)	+ 2.14,39
16.	Raimondas Rumšas (LTU)	+ 2.15,72
17.	Christophe Moreau (FRA)	+ 2.19,40
18.	Artūras Kasputis (LTU)	+ 2.20,09
19.	Beat Zberg (SUI)	+ 2.22,01
20.	Chann McRae (USA)	+ 2.26,93
21.	Bert Roesems (BEL)	+ 2.28,32
22.	Nathan O'Neill (AUS)	+ 2.39,20
23.	Rik Verbrugghe (BEL)	+ 2.56,54
24.	Martin Hvastija (SLO)	+ 3.04,04
25.	Eric Wohlberg (CAN)	+ 3.04,06
26.	Piotr Przydział (POL)	+ 3.08,64
27.	Tomasz Brożyna (POL)	+ 3.15,59
28.	Ruslan Ivanov (MDA)	+ 3.18,99
29.	Martin Rittsel (SWE)	+ 3.38,02
30.	Florian Wiesinger (AUT)	+ 3.49,27
31.	Bradley McGee (AUS)	+ 3.51,97
32.	Jan Hruška (CZE)	+ 3.53,66
33.	Michael Sandstød (DEN)	+ 4.13,52
34.	Sergiy Matveyev (UKR)	+ 4.15,98
35.	Milan Kadlec (CZE)	+ 4.19,46
36.	Levi Leipheimer (USA)	+ 4.27,69
37.	Andrey Mizurov (KAZ)	+ 4.34,23
38.	Bart Voskamp (NED)	+ 4.34,39
39.	Ondrej Slobodnik (SVK)	+ 4.36,57
40.	Gian Mario Ortenzi (ITA)	+ 5.11,21
41.	José Azevedo (POR)	+ 5.22,17
42.	Dmitry Fofonov (KAZ)	+ 5.25,09
43.	René Haselbacher (AUT)	+ 5.30,51
44.	Chris Newton (GBR)	+ 5.30,94
45.	Jaan Kirsipuu (EST)	+ 5.58,84
46.	Mikos Rnjakovic (YUG)	+ 6.05,06
47.	Benoît Joachim (LUX)	+ 6.23,97
48.	Ján Valach (SVK)	+ 7.01,77
49.	Branko Filip (SLO)	+ 7.28,23
50.	Morne Bester (RSA)	+ 7.47,24
51.	Amar El Nady (EGY)	+ 8.01,18
52.	Alexandr Kozlov (BLR)	+ 8.12,48
53.	Sergei Stets (BLR)	+ 8.53,29
54.	Ervin Lika (ALB)	+ 9.38,16
55.	Marc Vanacker (LUX)	+ 10.27,42
56.	Besnik Musaji (ALB)	+ 11.14,05
—	Igor Bonciucov (MDA)	DNS
—	David George (RSA)	DNS
—	Sergev Krushevskiy (UZB)	DNS
