= Gunnarsson =

Gunnarsson is a surname of Icelandic or Swedish origin, meaning son of Gunnar. In Icelandic names, the name is not strictly a surname, but a patronymic. Notable people with the surname include:

- Ágúst Ævar Gunnarsson (born 1976), Icelandic post-rock musician
- Aron Gunnarsson (born 1989), Icelandic professional football player
- Björn Leví Gunnarsson (born 1976), Icelandic politician
- Brynjar Gunnarsson (born 1975), Icelandic professional football player
- Carl Gunnarsson (born 1986), Swedish professional ice hockey player
- Daniel Gunnarsson (born 1992), Swedish professional ice hockey player
- Guðmundur Gunnarsson (born 1945), Icelandic labor leader; father of father of Icelandic singer Björk
- Guðmundur Steinn Gunnarsson (born 1982), Icelandic musician and composer
- Gunnar Gunnarsson (1889–1975), Icelandic author
- Gunnar Kristinn Gunnarsson (born 1933), Icelandic chess master
- Gunnar Thor Gunnarsson (born 1985), Icelandic professional football player
- Göran Gunnarsson (born 1950), Swedish lieutenant general
- Hanna Gunnarsson (born 1983), Swedish politician
- Hermann Gunnarsson (1946–2013), Icelandic television and radio personality
- Jan Gunnarsson (born 1962), Swedish tennis player
- Johánnes Gunnarsson (1897–1972), Icelandic Roman Catholic prelate
- Jonas Gunnarsson (disambiguation), several people
- Orri Gunnarsson (born 2003), Icelandic basketballer
- Patrik Gunnarsson (born 2000), Icelandic professional football player
- Pétur Gunnarsson (born 1947), Icelandic author, poet, and translator
- Rolf Gunnarsson (born 1946), Swedish politician; member of the Riksdag since 1994
- Sturla Gunnarsson (born 1951), Iceland-born Canadian film director
- Susanne Gunnarsson (born 1963), Swedish Olympic canoeist
- Thorarinn Gunnarsson (contemporary), American science-fiction and fantasy author
- Þórhallur Gunnarsson (born 1963), Icelandic actor and television personality
- Veigar Páll Gunnarsson (born 1980), Icelandic professional football player
- Victor Gunnarsson (1953–1993), Swedish extremist suspected in the murder of Swedish prime minister Olof Palme

== See also ==
- Gunnarsdóttir
