= Fredrik Ludvigsson =

Swedish cyclist

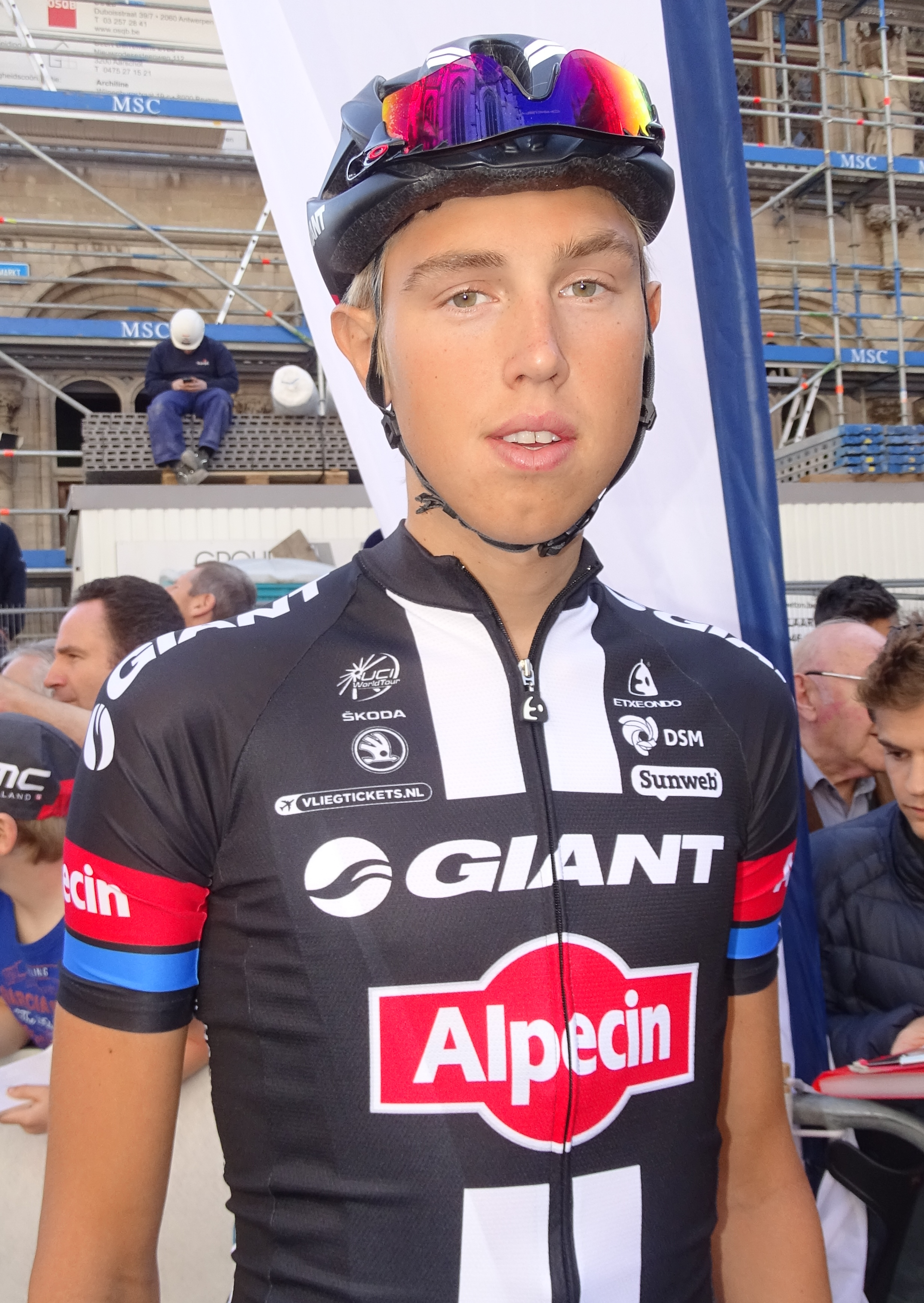
- Ludvigsson at the 2015 Brabantse Pijl.

Personal information
- Full name: Fredrik Ludvigsson
- Born: April 28, 1994 (age 32) Jönköping, Sweden
- Height: 189 cm (6 ft 2 1/2 in)
- Weight: 71 kg (157 lb)

Cycling career
- Sport: Cycling
- Current team: Retired
- Discipline: Road
- Role: Rider

Amateur teams
- 2013: Team People4you–Unaas Cycling
- 2014: Development Team Giant–Shimano

Professional teams
- 2014: Giant–Shimano (stagiaire)
- 2015–2016: Team Giant–Alpecin
- 2017: Copenhagen Pro Cycling
- 2018: Team Coop
- 2019: Memil Pro Cycling

Fredrik Ludvigsson (born 28 April 1994) is a Swedish former professional road cyclist. He is the younger brother of fellow cyclist Tobias Ludvigsson.

== Biography ==
=== 2014 season ===
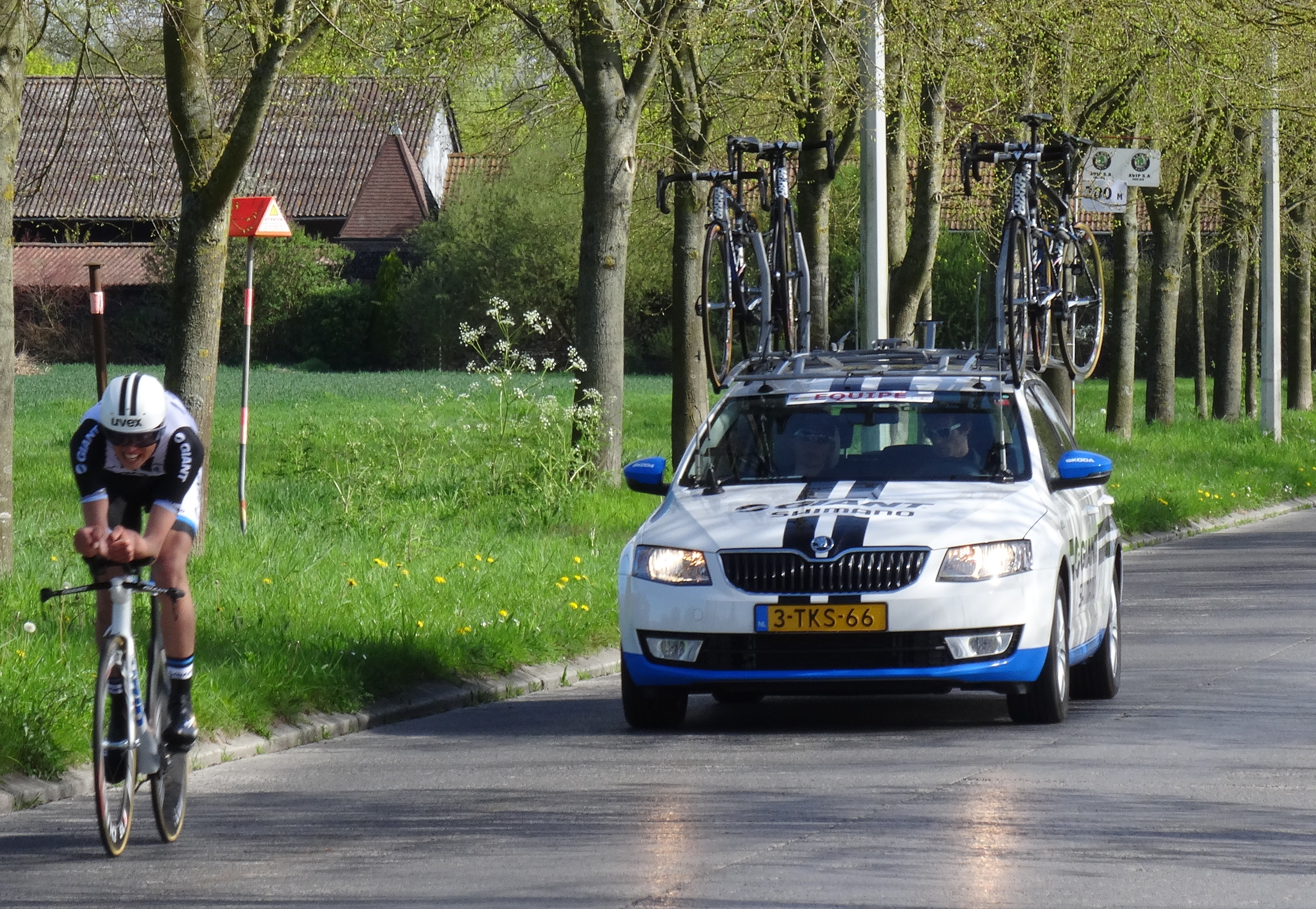
Ludvigsson during the stage 2a individual time trial at the 2014 Triptyque des Monts et Châteaux.

In March Ludvigsson was 10th overall and fifth in the young rider classification at the Tour de Normandie. In April he was fifth overall in the Triptyque des Monts et Châteaux in Belgium. Ludvigsson the finished 10th overall and won the young rider classification at the Circuit des Ardennes in France. He was 23rd in La Côte Picarde, and finished seventh in the U23 Liège–Bastogne–Liège. Ludvigsson finished 29th in the Rund um Köln. He rode into 16th place overall in the Tour d'Azerbaïdjan in May.

In June Ludvigsson did not finish the Paris–Roubaix Espoirs and came 27th in the Memorial Van Coningsloo before coming 50th overall and 23rd in the young rider classification at the Ronde de l'Oise stage race in France. He finished 44th overall at the Oberösterreich-Rundfahrt in Austria, before travelling to Sweden to compete at the 2014 national road cycling championships where he was 15th in the individual time trial and fourth in the road race. In August he began as a stagiaire at the Dutch UCI ProTeam Giant–Shimano for the remainder of their season. Ludvigsson did not finish the Tour Alsace or the Antwerpse Havenpijl but came 77th overall and 40th in the young rider classification at the Arctic Race of Norway. He then had some mediocre results in one day races in the 2014 UCI Europe Tour and finished his season with a 75th place at the Gooikse Pijl in Belgium. This was partly due to an injury in his leg, which was operated on after the Gooikse Pijl.

=== 2015 season ===
Ludvigsson joined the now German Team Giant–Alpecin with a two-year contract for the 2015 season.

=== 2016 season ===
On 23 January 2016, he was one of the six members of the Team Giant–Alpecin who were hit by a car which drove into on-coming traffic while they were training in Spain. All riders were in stable condition.

== Major results ==
2011
National Junior Road Championships

2nd Road race
3rd Time trial

2012
2nd Overall Trofeo Karlsberg
3rd Time trial, National Junior Road Championships
7th Overall Course de la Paix Juniors

1st Mountains classification

10th Overall GP Général Patton
2013
1st Overall Boucle de l'Artois

1st Points classification
1st Stage 2 (ITT)

2nd Overall Tour of Estonia

1st Young rider classification

4th Hadeland GP
5th Overall Tour de Normandie
2014
4th Road race, National Road Championships
5th Overall Le Triptyque des Monts et Châteaux
7th Liège–Bastogne–Liège U23
10th Overall Circuit des Ardennes

1st Young rider classification

10th Overall Tour de Normandie
2017
4th Time trial, National Road Championships
2018
5th Time trial, National Road Championships
