= Julia Borgström =

Swedish cyclist

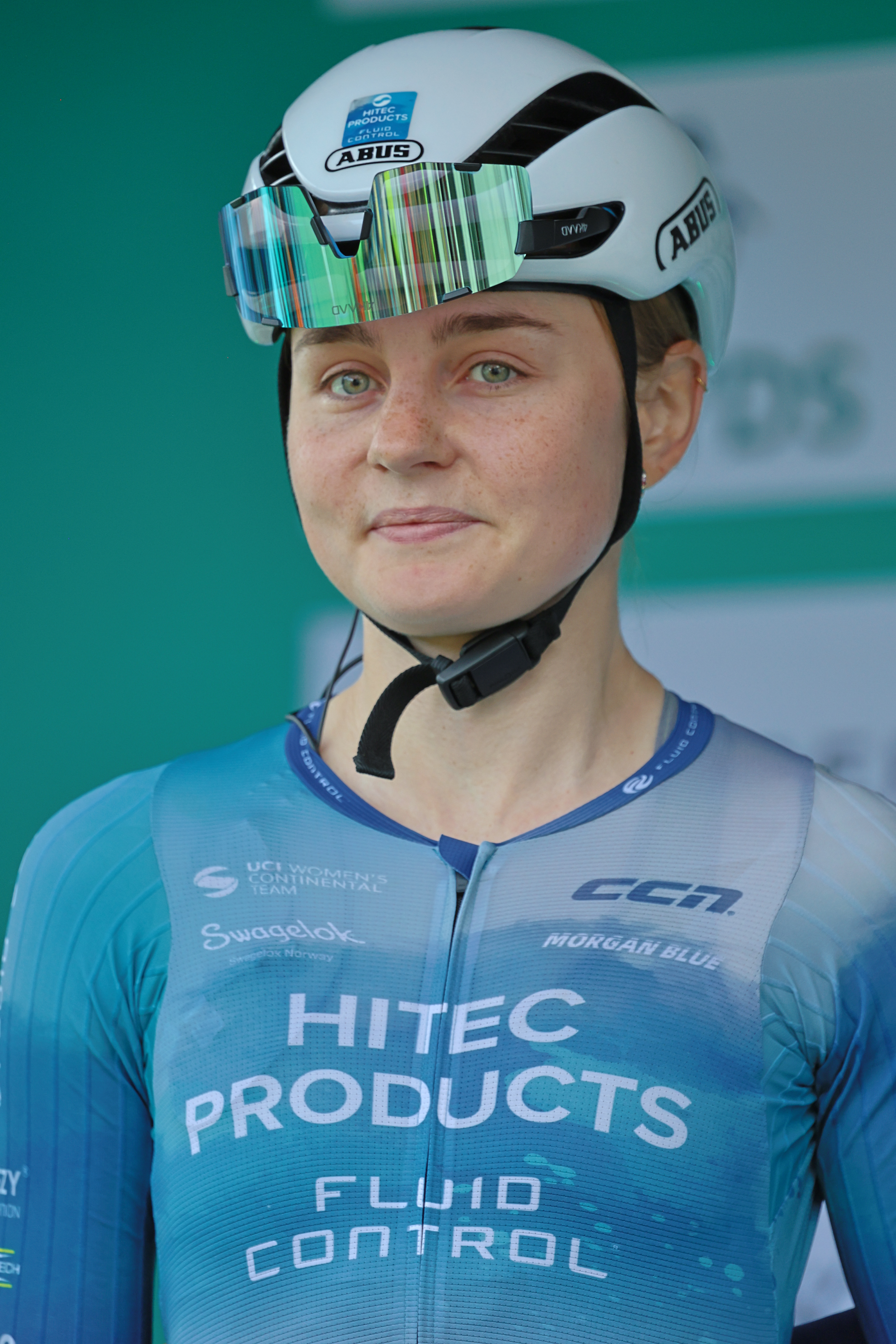
- Borgström at the 2026 Tour of Britain Women

Personal information
- Born: 9 June 2001 (age 25) Skanör med Falsterbo, Sweden

Cycling career
- Sport: Cycling
- Current team: Hitec Products–Fluid Control
- Discipline: Road
- Role: Rider

Amateur teams
- 2018–2019: Team Rytger powered by Cykeltøj-Online.dk
- 2026: Kasseien Fiets Huis CT

Professional teams
- 2020–2025: NXTG Racing
- 2026–: Hitec Products–Fluid Control

Julia Borgström (born 9 June 2001) is a Swedish professional racing cyclist, who rides for UCI Women's Continental Team Hitec Products–Fluid Control. The winner of the 2026 Swedish National Criterium Championships, Borgström has also finished as runner-up at the Swedish National Time Trial Championships twice, and the Swedish National Road Race Championships in 2026. Borgström has also represented Sweden at the UCI Road World Championships on five occasions, between 2020 and 2024.

== Career ==
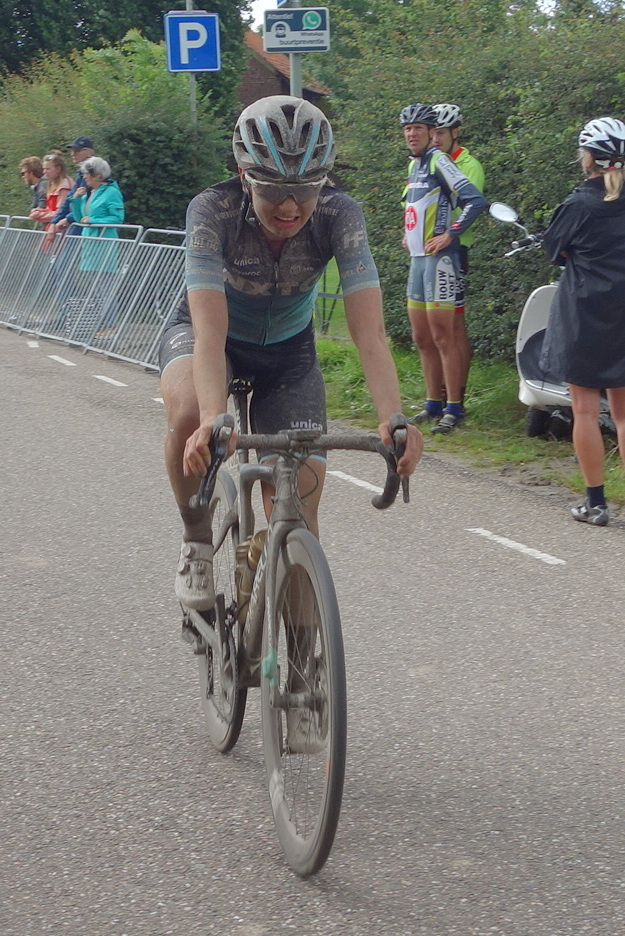
Borgström at the 2021 Holland Ladies Tour

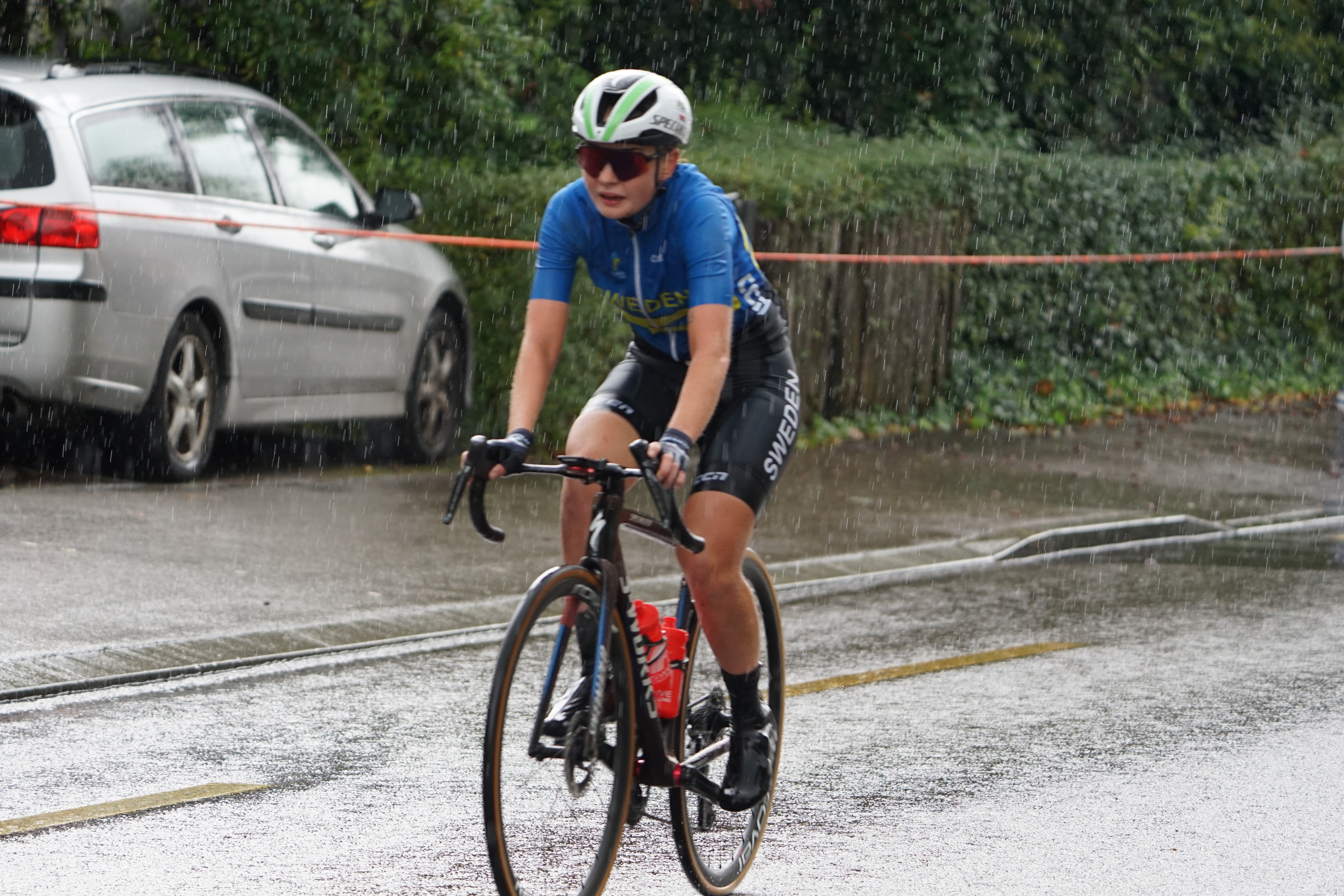
Borgström at the 2024 UCI Road World Championships

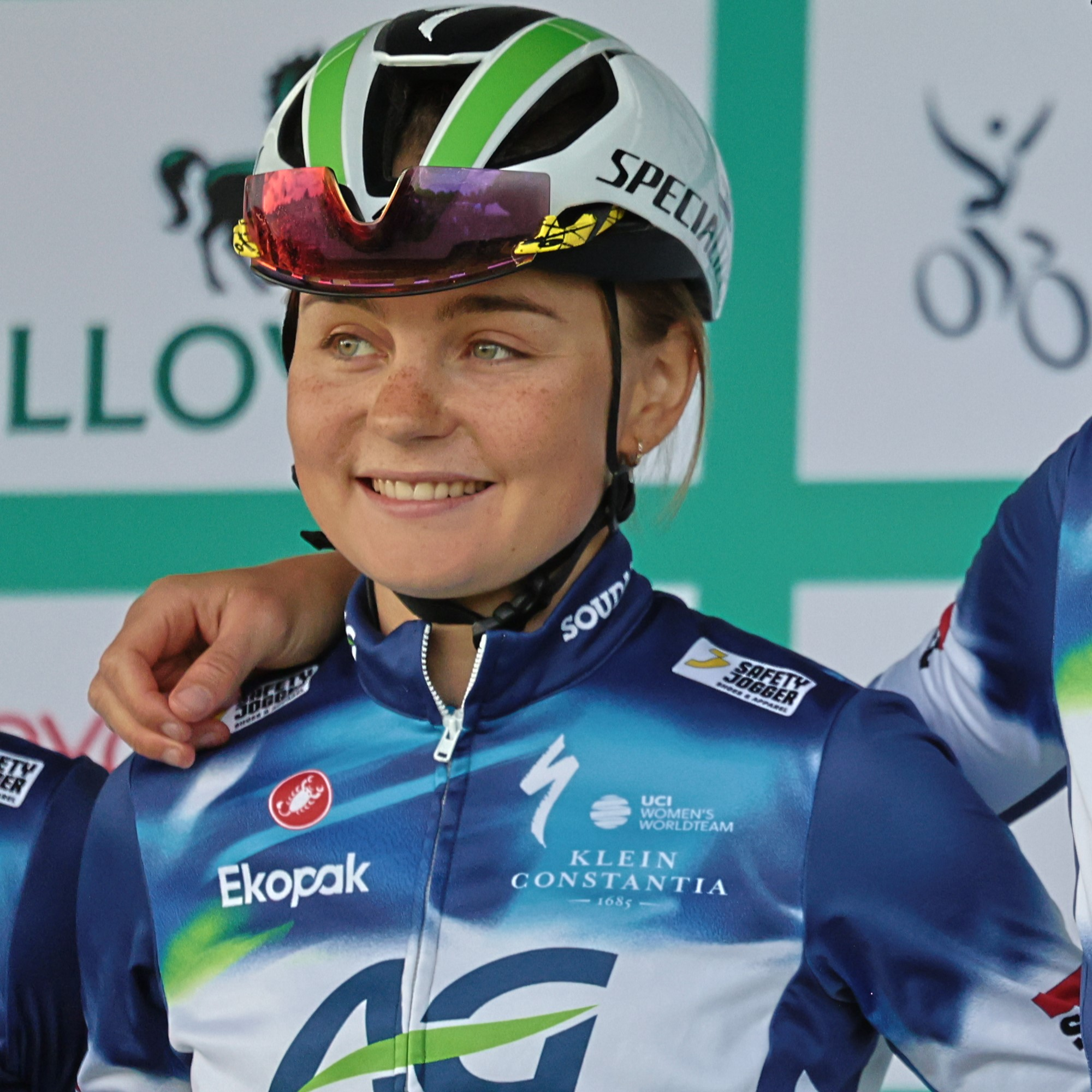
Borgström at the 2025 Tour of Britain

At the age of 15, she moved 4.5 hours away from home to attend a national elite sports school for cycling. Afterwards she joined a Belgian team, and lived alone in the Netherlands.

=== 2018 ===
2018 was Borgström's first year as a junior, and she began by competing for the Swedish junior women's national team in the women's junior Nations' Cup. In March, Borgström finished 18th in the Italian Piccolo Trofeo Alfredo Binda and 62nd in the Belgian Gent–Wevelgem U19. The following month she competed in the Healthy Ageing Tour U19, where her best result was a fourth place on the third stage in Groningen. During the month, Borgström also competed in the Dutch Omloop van Borsele U19.

In June 2018, at the Swedish Championships in Båstad, Borgström won gold in both the junior road race and time trial. The following month she competed in the junior category at the European Championships in the Czech Republic, finishing 24th in the road race and 26th in the time trial. In September 2018, Borgström won the third stage of the Dutch Watersley Ladies Challenge. That same month, she finished 65th in the junior women's road race at the World Championships in Innsbruck.

=== 2019 ===
In June 2019, Borgström finished third in the junior women's road race at the Swedish Championships. In August 2019, she competed in the junior category at the European Championships in Alkmaar, finishing 12th in the road race and 24th in the time trial. That same month, Borgström finished second in the junior time trial at the Swedish Championships in Båstad, only beaten by Wilma Olausson. In September 2019, she competed in the junior women's road race at the World Championships in Harrogate but was involved in a crash near the finish and ultimately finished 29th.

=== 2020–2023 ===
Ahead of the 2020 season, Borgström signed with the Belgian professional team Rogelli–Gyproc–APB, which later became NXTG Racing. She rode in the women's road race event at the 2020 UCI Road World Championships.

In 2022, she finished third in the youth classification at the 2022 Tour de France Femmes. She later signed a three-year contract with the now-renamed AG Insurance–Soudal–Quick-Step where she was coached by Alexander Wetterhall.

=== 2023–2026 ===
In mid-2023, Borgström began experiencing significant health problems that affected her performance. After approximately eighteen months of struggling with unexplained symptoms, she was diagnosed with relative energy deficiency in sport (RED-S), a condition caused by prolonged low energy availability that impairs physiological functioning and athletic performance. She later described this period as a major setback in her development, although the diagnosis enabled her to begin a targeted recovery process.

Despite these difficulties, Borgström continued to compete during the 2024 and 2025 seasons with UCI Women's WorldTeam AG Insurance–Soudal, primarily riding in support roles in major races. She later stated that she looked back on her time with the team with pride, describing it as one of the best periods of her life and highlighting the team's development and strong internal cohesion.

Following the 2025 season, Borgström left AG Insurance–Soudal after five years and joined the Belgian club team Kasseien Fiets Huis. The move was motivated by her health struggles and the demands of top-level competition. At her new team, she aimed to rebuild her form in a smaller and more supportive environment, with the goal of achieving results while safeguarding her health. Although she expressed the ambition to return to the WorldTour, she also emphasized her intention to focus on gradual development and enjoyment of racing, while beginning academic studies alongside her sporting career. In May 2026, Borgström joined UCI Women's Continental Team Hitec Products–Fluid Control for the remainder of the season; she finished second in both the Swedish National Road Race Championships and the Swedish National Time Trial Championships, losing out to Clara Lundmark and Mika Söderström respectively, and won the Swedish National Criterium Championships.

== Major results ==
2018
National Junior Road Championships

1st Time trial
1st Road race

1st Stage 3 Watersley Challenge
2019
National Junior Road Championships

2nd Time trial
3rd Road race

8th Overall Tour of Uppsala
2022
National Road Championships

2nd Time trial
3rd Road race

5th Overall Gracia–Orlová
5th À travers les Hauts-de-France
8th Overall RideLondon Classique

1st Young rider classification

Tour de France Femmes

Held after stage 6

2023
3rd Road race, National Road Championships
8th Grand Prix Stuttgart & Region
2025
3rd Time trial, National Road Championships
2026
National Road Championships

1st Criterium
2nd Time trial
2nd Road race

8th Région Pays de la Loire Tour
9th Overall Gracia–Orlová
9th Clásica Féminas de Navarra
