= Tobias Ludvigsson =

Swedish cyclist

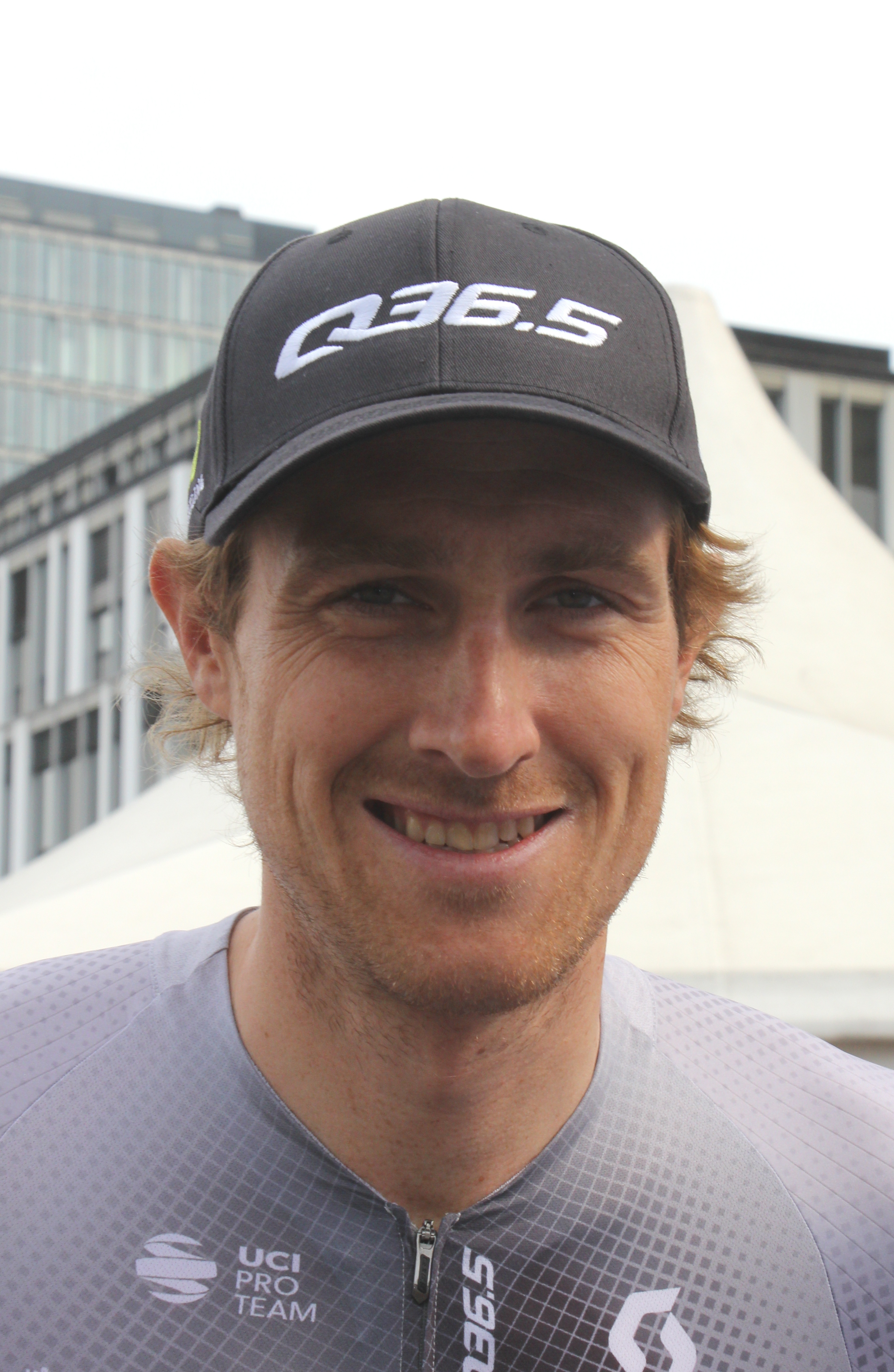
- Ludvigsson, Rund um Köln, 2023

Personal information
- Full name: Tobias Ludvigsson
- Born: 22 February 1991 (age 35) Huskvarna, Sweden
- Height: 1.94 m (6 ft 4 1/2 in)
- Weight: 75 kg (165 lb; 11 st 11 lb)

Cycling career
- Sport: Cycling
- Current team: Retired
- Disciplines: Road; Mountain biking
- Role: Rider
- Rider type: Time trial specialist

Amateur team
- 2011: Skil–Shimano (stagiaire)

Professional teams
- 2010–2011: Team CykelCity.se
- 2012–2016: Project 1t4i
- 2017–2022: FDJ
- 2023–2024: Q36.5 Pro Cycling Team

Major wins
- One-day races and Classics National Time Trial Championships (2017–2019)

Tobias Ludvigsson (born 22 February 1991) is a Swedish cyclist who competed as a professional from 2010 to 2024.

== Career ==
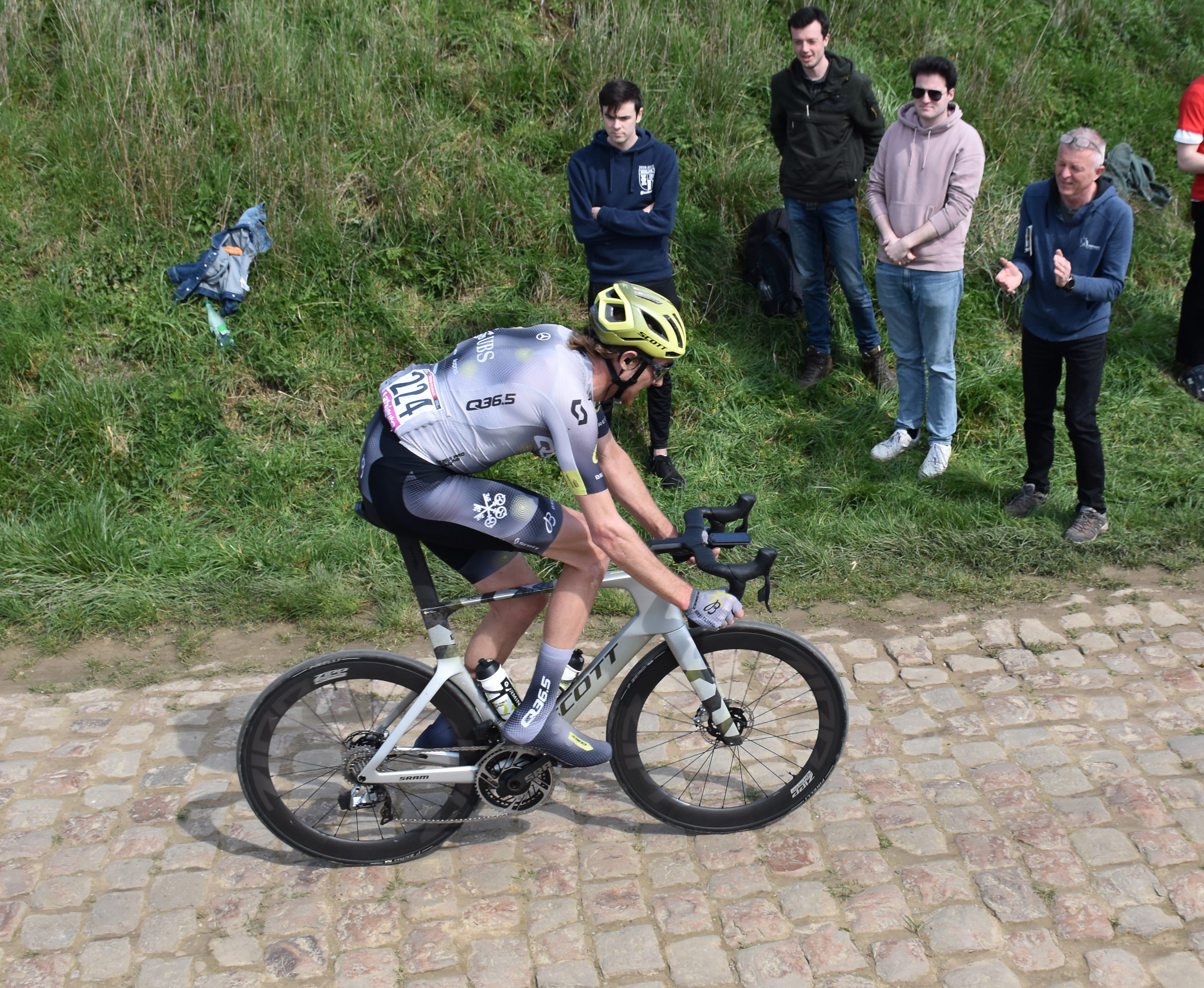
Paris-Roubaix 2023 - Secteur pavé de Quiévy à Saint-Python - N° 2 24 Tobias Ludvigsson.

As a junior Ludvigsson won several national titles, both on the road and in mountain biking. In 2009, he was eighth in the junior world road race championship.

In mid-2011 he was offered a training contract at the Skil–Shimano team. Soon after, Ludvigsson was offered a professional contract with the team for two years.

He is the older brother of Fredrik Ludvigsson. He was named in the start list for the 2016 Giro d'Italia, where he were able to hold the white jersey in the Young rider classification for three stages. In July 2018, he was named in the start list for the Tour de France.

== Major results ==
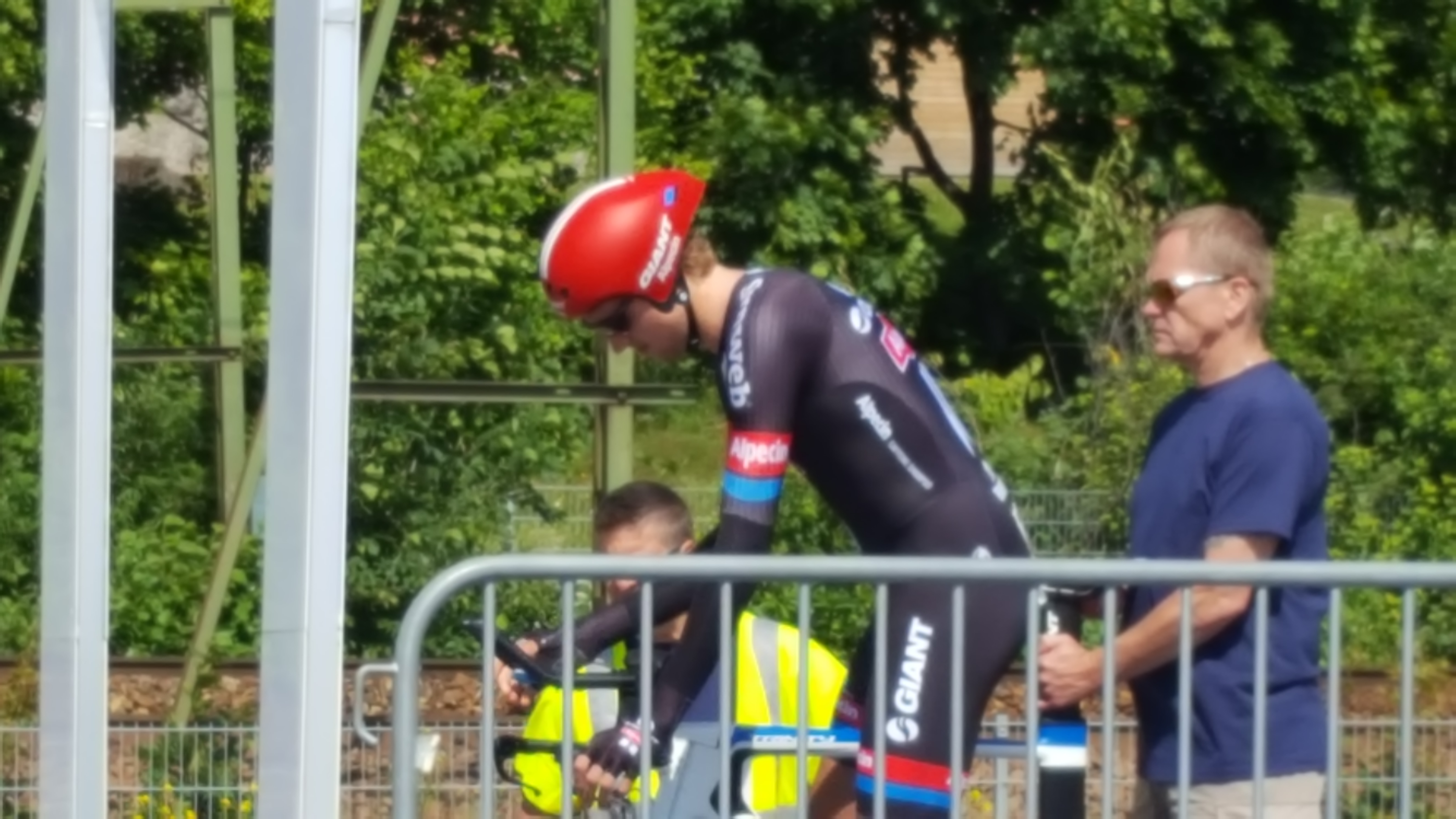
Ludvigsson at the 2016 Swedish National Time Trial Championships.

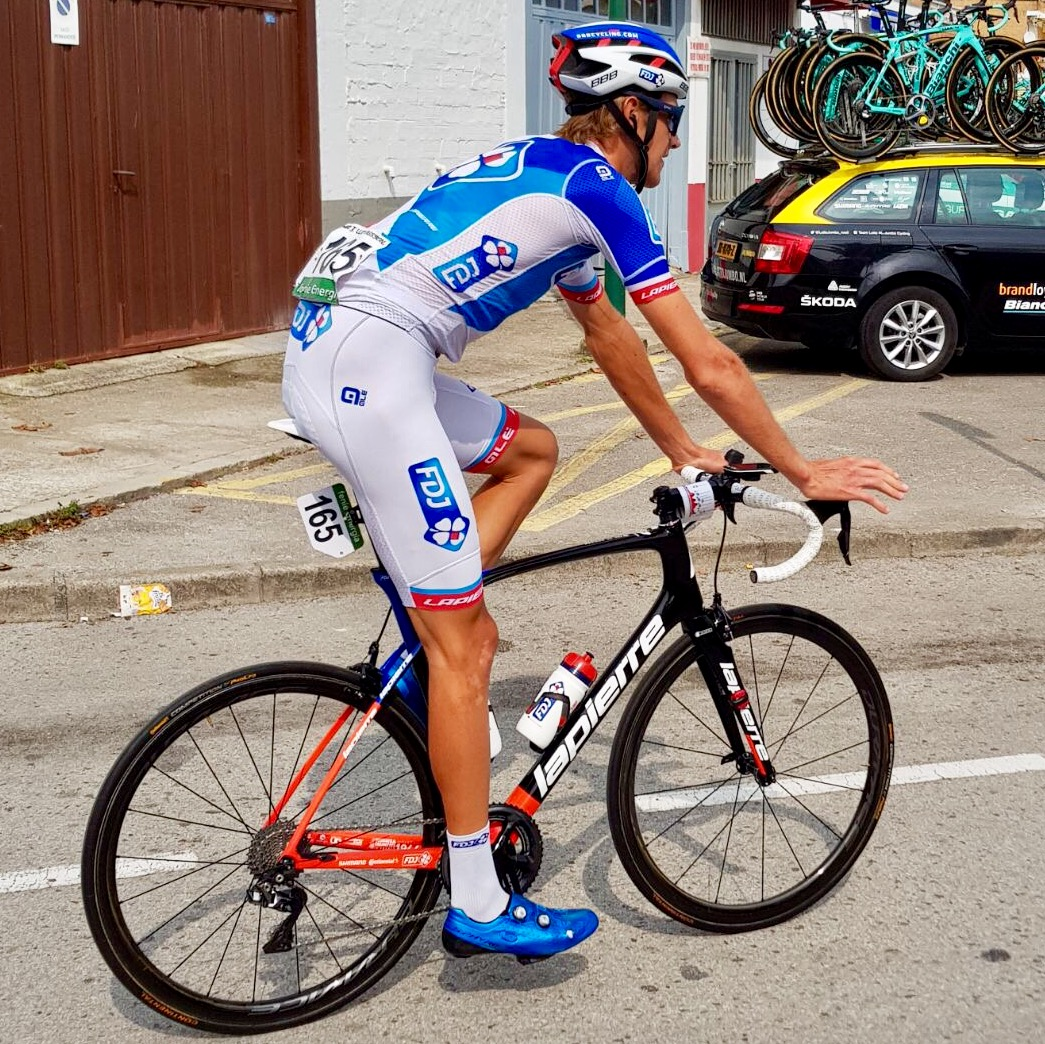
Ludvigsson at the 2017 Vuelta a España.

2008
National Junior Mountain Bike Championships

1st Time trial
1st Cross country
1st Team relay

1st Time trial, National Junior Road Championships
2009
1st Time trial, National Junior Road Championships
1st Junior Kinnekulleloppet
5th Overall Junior Tour de Himmelfart
8th Road race, UCI Junior World Championships
2010
2nd Overall Tour of Jamtland
3rd Overall Hammarö 3-dagars

1st Stage 2

2011
1st Overall Hammarö 3-dagars

1st Stages 1 & 3

1st Prologue Tour de Normandie
1st Stage 4 Thüringen Rundfahrt der U23
4th Overall Olympia's Tour
5th La Côte Picarde
6th Himmerland Rundt
2012
2nd Time trial, National Road Championships
3rd Overall Tour of Hainan
4th Västboloppet
2013
1st Västboloppet
2nd Time trial, National Road Championships
2nd Overall Driedaagse van West-Vlaanderen

1st Young rider classification

3rd Overall Circuit de la Sarthe

1st Young rider classification

2014
1st Overall Étoile de Bessèges

1st Young rider classification
1st Stage 5 (ITT)

5th Overall Tour Méditerranéen
2015
National Road Championships

3rd Road race
5th Time trial

2016
2nd Time trial, National Road Championships
Giro d'Italia

Held after Stages 1–3

2017
1st Time trial, National Road Championships
2018
National Road Championships

1st Time trial
2nd Road race

2019
National Road Championships

1st Time trial
2nd Road race

2nd Overall Étoile de Bessèges
9th Overall Tour de Wallonie
2020
2nd Time trial, National Road Championships
2021
National Road Championships

3rd Time trial
5th Road race

2022
National Road Championships

2nd Road race
3rd Time trial

2024
2nd Time trial, National Road Championships

=== Grand Tour general classification results timeline ===
Grand Tour	2013	2014	2015	2016	2017	2018	2019	2020	2021	2022
Giro d'Italia	112	DNF	83	51	85	—	82	—	—	102
Tour de France	—	—	—	—	—	74	—	—	—	—
Vuelta a España	—	62	—	52	59	—	44	—	99	—

Legend
—	Did not compete
DNF	Did not finish
