= Martin Rittsel =

Swedish cyclist

Personal information
- Born: 28 March 1971 (age 55) Växjö, Sweden

Cycling career
- Sport: Cycling
- Current team: Retired
- Discipline: Road
- Role: Rider
- Rider type: Time-trialist

Professional teams
- 1998: Cantina Tollo
- 1999: Chicky World
- 2000–2002: Memory Card–Jack & Jones
- 2003: Team Fakta

Martin Rittsel (born 28 March 1971 in Växjö) is a former Swedish cyclist.

== Major results ==
1989
1st Time trial, National Junior Road Championships
1995 (1 pro win)
1st Stage 4 Peace Race
2nd Time trial, National Road Championships
1996
1st Stage 4 Settimana Internazionale di Coppi e Bartali
3rd Time trial, National Road Championships
1997
1st Overall Cinturón a Mallorca

1st Stage 4b

1998 (1)
1st Road race, National Road Championships
1999 (1)
1st Overall Vuelta a Argentina
1st Stage 3b (ITT) Bayern Rundfahrt
2nd Overall Sachsen Tour

1st Prologue

2nd Overall Niedersachsen-Rundfahrt
3rd Overall Tour of Sweden
3rd Grand Prix de la Ville de Lillers
2000 (1)
1st Overall Four Days of Dunkirk
2nd Overall Tour de Picardie
7th Overall Paris–Nice
2002
3rd Time trial, National Road Championships
