= Sara Mustonen (cyclist) =

Swedish cyclist

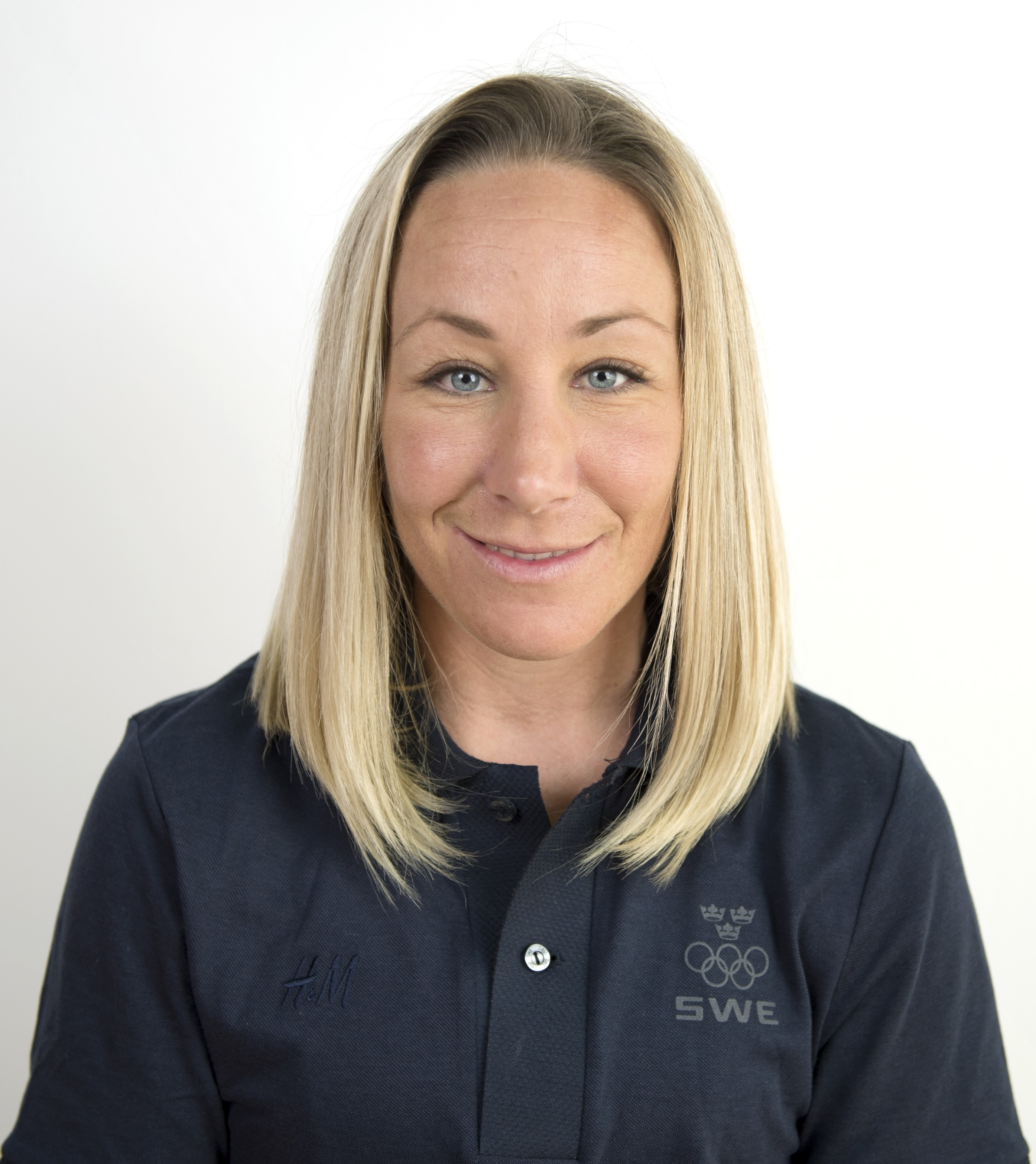
- Mustonen in November 2015

Personal information
- Full name: Sara Johanna Mustonen
- Born: 8 February 1981 (age 45) Höganäs, Sweden
- Height: 161 cm (5 ft 3 in)
- Weight: 58 kg (128 lb)

Cycling career
- Sport: Cycling
- Discipline: Road
- Role: Rider
- Rider type: All-rounder

Amateur team
- 2019: Chevalmeire Cycling Team

Professional teams
- 2007: SC Michela Fanini Record Rox
- 2008: CMAX Dila
- 2009: Cykelcity.se
- 2009–2012: Hitec Products UCK
- 2013: Faren–Let's Go Finland
- 2014–2016: Giant–Shimano
- 2017: Team VéloCONCEPT
- 2018: Experza–Footlogix
- 2019: Health Mate–Cyclelive Team
- 2020: Chevalmeire Cycling Team

Sara Mustonen (born 8 February 1981) is a Swedish racing cyclist, who most recently rode for UCI Women's Continental Team Chevalmeire Cycling Team. Prior to becoming a cyclist she was a boxer. She took up cycle racing after working as a bicycle courier. She competed in the women's road race at the 2008 Summer Olympics and the 2013 UCI women's road race in Florence. Her father is Finnish.

== Major results ==
2006
5th Time trial, National Road Championships
2008
6th Tour de Berne
10th GP Liberazione
2009
National Road Championships

4th Road race
5th Time trial

4th Overall Tour de Bretagne Féminin
4th Omloop van Borsele
5th Holland Hills Classic
6th Open de Suède Vårgårda
7th Rund um die Nürnberger Altstadt
9th Ronde van Gelderland
2010
National Road Championships

3rd Road race
3rd Time trial

6th Dwars door de Westhoek
8th Overall Tour Féminin en Limousin
8th GP Stad Roeselare
9th Overall Women's Tour of New Zealand
9th Overall La Route de France
9th Grand Prix Elsy Jacobs
2011
National Road Championships

3rd Time trial
4th Road race

3rd Cholet Pays de Loire Dames
5th Overall Tour of Chongming Island
5th Omloop van Borsele
2012
10th Overall Belgium Tour
2013
5th Tour of Chongming Island World Cup
10th Overall Tour of Chongming Island
2014
National Road Championships

3rd Road race
5th Time trial

4th 7-Dorpenomloop Aalburg
6th Cholet Pays de Loire Dames
2015
National Road Championships

2nd Road race
2nd Time trial

3rd Omloop van het Hageland
3rd Trofee Maarten Wynants
2016
2nd Road race, National Road Championships
5th Diamond Tour
7th Overall Ladies Tour of Norway
2017
9th Erondegemse Pijl
2018
3rd Overall Tour of Uppsala
3rd Tour of Guangxi
10th Grand Prix International d'Isbergues
2019
1st Overall Tour of Uppsala

1st Points classification
1st Stage 1

9th Vuelta a la Comunitat Valenciana Feminas

== See also ==
- 2014 Team Giant-Shimano season
