= Michael Andersson (cyclist) =

Swedish cyclist

Personal information
- Born: 4 March 1967 (age 59) Höganäs, Sweden

Cycling career
- Sport: Cycling
- Discipline: Road
- Role: Rider

Professional teams
- 1995: Sicasal–Acral
- 1996: Team Telekom
- 1997–1998: TVM–Farm Frites
- 1999: Acceptcard Pro Cycling
- 2000: De Nardi–Pasta Montegrappa
- 2000–2001: Mercatone Uno–Albacom
Medal record
Representing Sweden
Men's road bicycle racing
World Championships
Silver medal – second place	1999 Verona	Elite Men's Time Trial

Michael Andersson (born 4 March 1967) is a Swedish former road cyclist who was a professional rider from 1995 to 2001. He competed three times at the Summer Olympics (1992, 1996 and 2000). Andersson is a three-time winner of the Tour of Sweden. Andersson started in the Giro d'Italia two times, and in the Vuelta a España four times; the only Grand Tour he finished was the 1995 Vuelta a España.

== Major results ==
1990
2nd Grand Prix de France
5th Chrono des Herbiers
1991
1st Overall Tour of Sweden

1st Stage 1b

1992
1st Overall Tour of Sweden

1st Stages 1b (ITT) & 5 (ITT)

1993
National Road Championships

1st Time trial
2nd Road race

1st Paris–Évreux
4th Overall Tour of Sweden
9th Chrono des Herbiers
1994
1st Time trial, National Road Championships
1st Overall Cinturó de l'Empordà

1st Stage 2

1995
1st Overall Rapport Toer

1st Stage 6 (ITT)

1st Overall Giro del Capo
1996
1st Overall Tour of China

1st Stage 3

1st Stage 3a (ITT) Tour of Sweden
2nd Overall Peace Race

1st Stage 3

9th Overall Ronde van Nederland
1997
1st Time trial, National Road Championships
1st Tour de Berne
7th Overall Vuelta a la Comunidad Valenciana
1998
National Road Championships

1st Time trial
3rd Road race

4th Overall Tour of Sweden
1999
1st Time trial, National Road Championships
2nd Time trial, UCI Road World Championships
3rd Overall Ringerike GP

1st Stage 3

9th Overall Tour of Sweden
2000
1st Time trial, National Road Championships
1st Overall Tour of Sweden

1st Stage 2

1st Scandinavian Open Time Trial
5th Overall Istrian Spring Trophy
