= Jacob Ahlsson =

Swedish cyclist

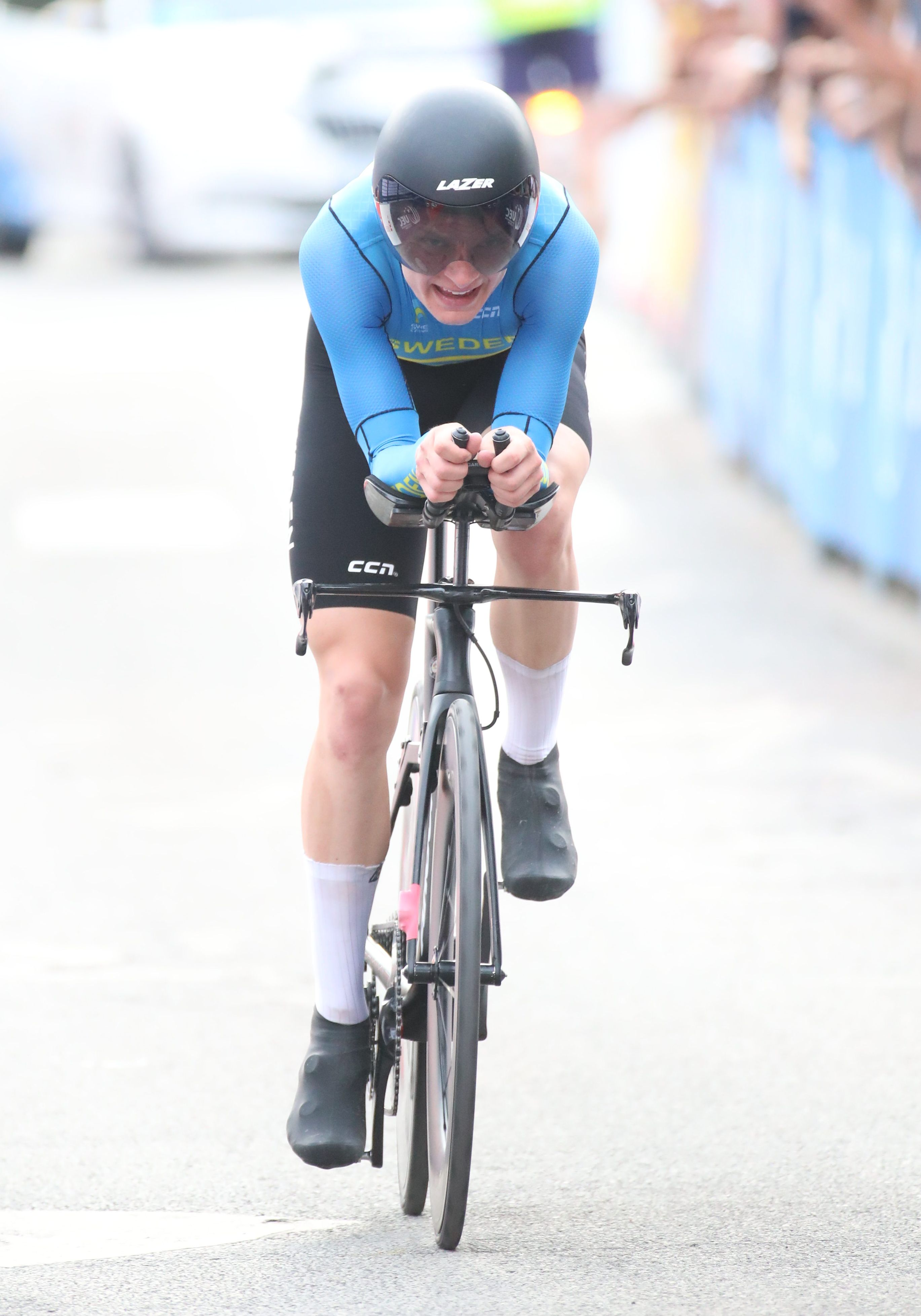
- Ahlsson at the 2022 European Championships

Personal information
- Born: 3 August 1998 (age 28) Kumla, Sweden
- Height: 1.83 m (6 ft 0 in)
- Weight: 68 kg (150 lb)

Cycling career
- Sport: Cycling
- Discipline: Road
- Role: Rider
- Rider type: Time trialist

Amateur teams
- 2018: Team Västergötland
- 2019–2020: Maifracing
- 2021: Motala AIF CK

Professional team
- 2022: Motala AIF Serneke Allebike

Jacob Ahlsson (born 3 August 1998) is a Swedish cyclist, who last rode for UCI Continental team Motala AIF Continental. His brother Jonathan is also a cyclist.

== Major results ==
2019
5th Time trial, National Road Championships
2020
1st Time trial, National Road Championships
1st Time trial, National Under-23 Road Championships
2021
2nd Time trial, National Road Championships
2022
1st Time trial, National Road Championships
2023
1st Time trial, National Road Championships
