= Airtox–Carl Ras Junior Women =

Cycling team

Airtox-Carl Ras Junior Women
Team information
- UCI code: OCK (2010–2011); BTK (2012); RYT (2013); TRY (2014–)
- Registered: Denmark
- Founded: 2010
- Discipline: Road
- Status: National (2010–2013); UCI Women's Team (2014–2015); National (2016–)

Team name history
- 2010–2011 2012 2013 2014–2016 2017–: Odder Cykel Klub; BikeToyz–Kvickly Odder; Rytger Cycling Team; Team Rytger; Team Rytger powered by Cykeltøj-Online.dk

Airtox-Carl Ras Junior Women is a cycling team based in Denmark. In 2015 it was registered as a UCI Women's Team, enabling it to compete in elite road bicycle racing events such as the UCI Women's Road World Cup, but returned to the Danish national ranks from 2016.

== Major results ==
2018
Nootdorp, Clara Lundmark
Stage 3 Watersley Ladies Tour, Julia Borgström
Youth Olympic Games – Team Time Trial, Mie Saabye

== National champions ==
2010
Denmark Road Race, Annika Langvad
Denmark Time Trial, Annika Langvad

2011
Denmark Time Trial, Annika Langvad

2013
Denmark Road Race, Kamilla Sofie Vallin

2014
Netherlands Track (Madison), Kelly Markus

2016
Denmark Road Race, Emma Norsgaard Jørgensen

2017
Denmark Junior Time Trial, Emma Norsgaard Jørgensen

2018
Denmark Junior Cyclo-cross, Mie Saabye
Sweden Junior Time Trial, Julia Borgström
Sweden Junior Road Race, Julia Borgström
Denmark Junior Time Trial, Mie Saabye
Denmark Junior Road Race, Mie Saabye
