= 2022 RideLondon Classique =

2022 UCI Women's World Tour, race 13 of 23

Race details
- Dates: 27–29 May
- Stages: 3
- Distance: 363.4 km (225.8 mi)
- Winning time: 9h 10' 02"

Results
Jersey awarded to the overall winner	Winner	Lorena Wiebes (NED)	(Team DSM)
	Second	Elisa Balsamo (ITA)	(Trek–Segafredo)
	Third	Emma Norsgaard (DEN)	(Movistar Team)
Jersey awarded to the points classification winner	Points	Lorena Wiebes (NED)	(Team DSM)
Jersey awarded to the mountains classification winner	Mountains	Anna Henderson (GBR)	(Team Jumbo–Visma)
Jersey awarded to the young rider classification winner	Young rider	Julia Borgström (SWE)	(AG Insurance–NXTG)
	Team	Valcar–Travel & Service	

The 2022 RideLondon Classique was the eighth edition of the RideLondon Classique, part of the UCI Women's World Tour. The race was part of the RideLondon cycling festival. The race took place from 27 to 29 May 2022. It was won by Dutch rider Lorena Wiebes, who also won all three stages.

It was the first time that the Classique took place over multiple days, having previously been a one-day race in central London. The Classique was last held in 2019, due to the COVID-19 pandemic.

Compared to previous editions of the Classique, there was a reduced prize pot of €60,000 spread out over the three stages.

The race was criticised for not providing live TV coverage for all three stages - with only the final stage in central London broadcast live. The UCI subsequently warned that the 2023 event would be demoted to the UCI ProSeries if stages were not broadcast on live television.

== Teams ==
In April 2022, organisers announced that 21 teams had been invited to take part, with 12 UCI Women's WorldTeams and 9 UCI Women's Continental Teams.

UCI Women's WorldTeams

- Canyon//SRAM
- EF Education–Tibco–SVB
- FDJ Nouvelle-Aquitaine Futuroscope
- Liv Racing Xstra
- Movistar Team
- Roland Cogeas Edelweiss Squad
- Team DSM
- Team Jumbo–Visma
- SD Worx
- Trek–Segafredo
- UAE Team ADQ
- Uno-X Pro Cycling Team

UCI Women's Continental Teams

- Ceratizit–WNT Pro Cycling
- Parkhotel Valkenburg
- Valcar–Travel & Service
- Le Col–Wahoo
- AG Insurance–NXTG
- Andy Schleck–CP NVST–Immo Losch
- AWOL O'Shea
- IBCT
- Team Coop–Hitec Products

== Route and stages ==
Revealed in February 2022, the route used two stages in Essex, with the third stage using a central London circuit similar to previous editions of the RideLondon Classique.

Stage characteristics
Stage	Date	Course	Distance	Type	Winner
1	27 May	Maldon to Maldon	137.1 km (85.2 mi)	Hilly stage	Lorena Wiebes (NED)
2	28 May	Chelmsford to Epping	141 km (88 mi)	Hilly stage	Lorena Wiebes (NED)
3	29 May	London to London	85.3 km (53.0 mi)	Flat stage	Lorena Wiebes (NED)
Total			363.4 km (225.8 mi)		

== Classification leadership table ==
Classification leadership by stage
Stage	Winner	General classification	Points classification	Mountains classification	Young rider classification	British rider classification	Team classification
1	Lorena Wiebes	Lorena Wiebes	Lorena Wiebes	Anna Henderson	Vittoria Guazzini	Alice Barnes	Valcar–Travel & Service
2	Lorena Wiebes	Lorena Wiebes	Lorena Wiebes	Anna Henderson	Vittoria Guazzini	Anna Henderson	Valcar–Travel & Service
3	Lorena Wiebes	Lorena Wiebes	Lorena Wiebes	Anna Henderson	Julia Borgström	Anna Henderson	Valcar–Travel & Service
Final		Lorena Wiebes	Lorena Wiebes	Anna Henderson	Julia Borgström	Anna Henderson	Valcar–Travel & Service
