= Lucas Persson =

Swedish cyclist

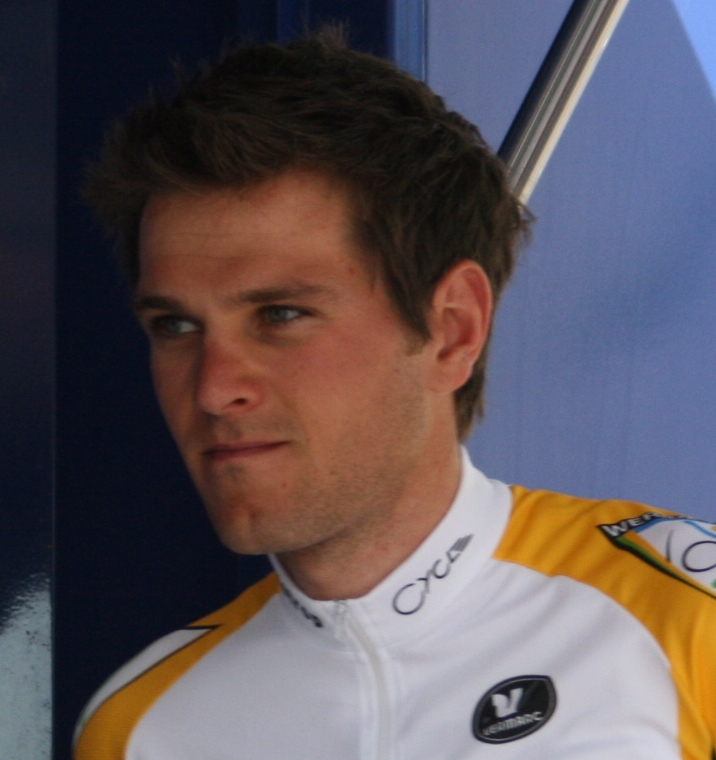

Personal information
- Born: 16 March 1984 (age 42) Kiruna, Sweden

Cycling career
- Sport: Cycling
- Current team: Retired
- Discipline: Road
- Role: Rider

Professional teams
- 2007–2008: Unibet.com
- 2009: Team Capinordic
- 2010: CykelCity
- 2011–2013: Concordia Forsikring-Himmerland

Lucas Persson (born 16 March 1984) is a Swedish cyclist.

== Palmares ==
2004

National Team Time Trial Champion

2005

1st Scandinavian Race Uppsala

2006

1st Scandinavian Race Uppsala
3rd National Road Race Championships

2007

1st Stage 2 Triptyque Ardennais
1st Scandinavian Open Road Race
2nd Circuito Montañés
3rd National Time Trial Championships
