= Fredrik Ericsson (cyclist) =

Swedish cyclist

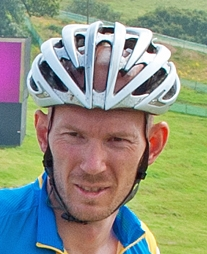
- Fredrik Ericsson in 2012

Personal information
- Born: 18 September 1978 (age 48) Uppsala, Sweden

Cycling career
- Sport: Cycling
- Current team: Retired
- Discipline: Road
- Role: Rider
- Rider type: Time trialist

Professional teams
- 2007: Time–Van Hemert
- 2008: Cykelcity.se
- 2009: Team Capinordic

Fredrik Ericsson (born 18 September 1978) is a Swedish former professional road cyclist. He notably competed in the time trial at the 2008 UCI Road World Championships and won the Ringerike GP and the Swedish National Time Trial Championships the same year.

== Major results ==
2003
1st Skandisloppet
2004
9th Overall Ringerike GP
2006
3rd Overall Ringerike GP
9th De Drie Zustersteden
2007
6th Overall Ringerike GP
2008
1st Time trial, National Road Championships
1st Overall Ringerike GP
2nd Univest Grand Prix
4th Scandinavian Open Road Race
10th GP Copenhagen
10th Tartu Grand Prix
2009
National Road Championships

2nd Road race
2nd Time trial

3rd Overall Ringerike GP
4th Duo Normand
5th Grand Prix Herning
5th Scandinavian Race Uppsala
6th Overall Tour du Gévaudan Languedoc-Roussillon
6th Overall Okolo Slovenska
6th Grand Prix Cristal Energie
10th Overall Danmark Rundt
10th Chrono Champenois
