= Hanna Nilsson =

Swedish cyclist

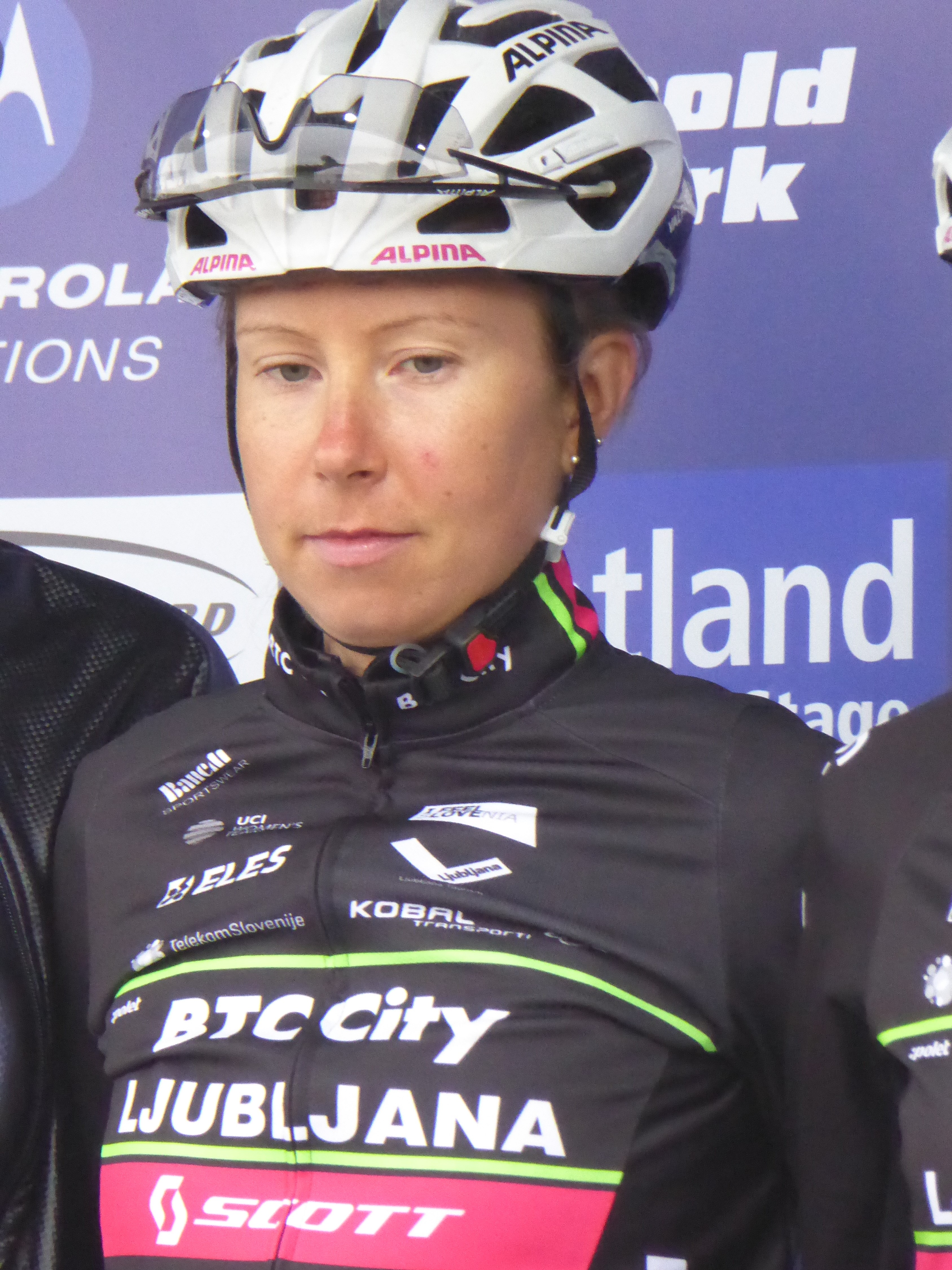
- Nilsson at the 2019 Women's Tour of Scotland

Personal information
- Full name: Hanna Nilsson
- Born: 16 February 1992 (age 34) Kristianstad, Sweden

Cycling career
- Sport: Cycling
- Disciplines: Gravel; Road (former)
- Role: Rider
- Rider type: Climber

Amateur team
- 2015: Autoglas Wetteren

Professional teams
- 2012–2013: Alriksson - Go:Green
- 2016: Lensworld–Zannata
- 2017–2019: BTC City Ljubljana
- 2020: Parkhotel Valkenburg
- 2021: Lotto–Soudal Ladies
- 2022–2023: Ceratizit–WNT Pro Cycling
- 2024: Chevalmeire

Hanna Nilsson (born 16 February 1992) is a Swedish racing cyclist, who competes in gravel cycling. Prior to this, Nilsson competed in road bicycle racing for seven different professional teams, and contested the road race at the UCI Road World Championships on nine occasions, between 2012 and 2022. Nilsson's one professional road racing victory came at the 2022 Tour of Uppsala, where she won the second stage. In 2025 she's riding for Sartoria cycling club in gravel.

== Major results ==
2015
National Road Championships

3rd Time trial
3rd Road race

2017
2nd Overall Tour Cycliste Féminin International de l'Ardèche

1st Mountains classification

2nd Giro del Trentino Alto Adige-Südtirol
National Road Championships

3rd Time trial
3rd Road race

6th Giro dell'Emilia Internazionale Donne Elite
7th Overall Gracia–Orlová
8th La Classique Morbihan
9th Ljubljana–Domžale–Ljubljana TT
10th La Course by Le Tour de France
2018
6th Giro dell'Emilia Internazionale Donne Elite
8th Durango-Durango Emakumeen Saria
8th Grand Prix de Plumelec-Morbihan Dames
10th Overall Tour Cycliste Féminin International de l'Ardèche
2019
National Road Championships

2nd Road race
3rd Time trial

7th Overall Women's Tour of Scotland
8th Overall Gracia–Orlová
9th Donostia San Sebastian Klasikoa
10th Overall Ladies Tour of Norway
2021
3rd Time trial, National Road Championships
2022
5th Overall Tour of Uppsala

1st Stage 2

5th Grand Prix du Morbihan Féminin
2025
1st Overall UCI Gravel World series Poland
