= Alex Ekström =

Swedish cyclist

Personal information
- Born: 4 October 1883 Enköping, Sweden
- Died: 20 February 1958 (aged 74) Stockholm, Sweden

Cycling career
- Sport: Cycling

Alex Ekström (4 October 1883 – 20 February 1958) was a Swedish cyclist. He competed in two events at the 1912 Summer Olympics.
