= Karl Landsberg =

Swedish cyclist

Personal information
- Born: 13 May 1890 Örebro, Sweden
- Died: 4 August 1964 (aged 74) Örebro, Sweden

Cycling career
- Sport: Cycling

Karl Landsberg (13 May 1890 – 4 August 1964) was a Swedish cyclist. He competed in two events at the 1912 Summer Olympics.
