= Gunnarsdóttir =

Gunnarsdóttir is an Icelandic patronymic, meaning daughter of Gunnar. In Icelandic names, the name is not strictly a surname. Notable people with the patronymic include:

- Elín Ebba Gunnarsdóttir (born 1953), Icelandic author
- Halla Gunnarsdóttir (born 1981), Iceland politician, journalist and writer
- Þorgerður Katrín Gunnarsdóttir (born 1965), Icelandic politician; government minister and member of the Alþing since 1999

== See also ==
- Gunnarsson
