= Tour of Sweden =

Road bicycle racing stage race

Race details
- Region: Sweden
- Local name: Postgirot Open
- Discipline: Road
- Type: Stage race

History
- First edition: 1982
- Editions: 21
- Final edition: 2002
- First winner: Tommy Prim (SWE)
- Most wins: Michael Andersson (SWE) (3)
- Final winner: Kurt Asle Arvesen (NOR)

The Tour of Sweden (or Postgirot Open) was an annual professional road bicycle racing stage race held in Sweden from 1982 to 2002. It replaced the former Six Days Race, which was held between 1924 and 1975.

== Past winners ==
- 1982 : Tommy Prim (SWE)
- 1983 : Tommy Prim (2) (SWE)
- 1984 : Allan Peiper (AUS)
- 1985 : Marc Gomez (FRA)
- 1986 : Gilbert Duclos-Lassalle (FRA)
- 1987 : Gerrie Knetemann (NED)
- 1988 : Jesper Worre (DEN)
- 1989 : Atle Kvålsvoll (NOR)
- 1990 : Dimitri Zhdanov (USSR)
- 1991 : Michael Andersson (SWE)
- 1992 : Michael Andersson (2) (SWE)
- 1993 : Phil Anderson (AUS)
- 1994 : Erik Dekker (NED)
- 1995 : Erik Dekker (2) (NED)
- 1996 : Michael Blaudzun (DEN)
- 1997 : Giampaolo Mondini (ITA)
- 1998 : Steven de Jongh (NED)
- 1999 : Jakob Piil (DEN)
- 2000 : Michael Andersson (3) (SWE)
- 2001 : Thor Hushovd (NOR)
- 2002 : Kurt Asle Arvesen (NOR)
