= Jonas Gunnarsson =

Jonas Gunnarsson may refer to:

- Jonas Gunnarsson (ice hockey) (born 1992), Swedish ice hockey player
- Jonas Gunnarsson (politician) (born 1980), Swedish politician
