= Alexander Wetterhall =

Swedish cyclist

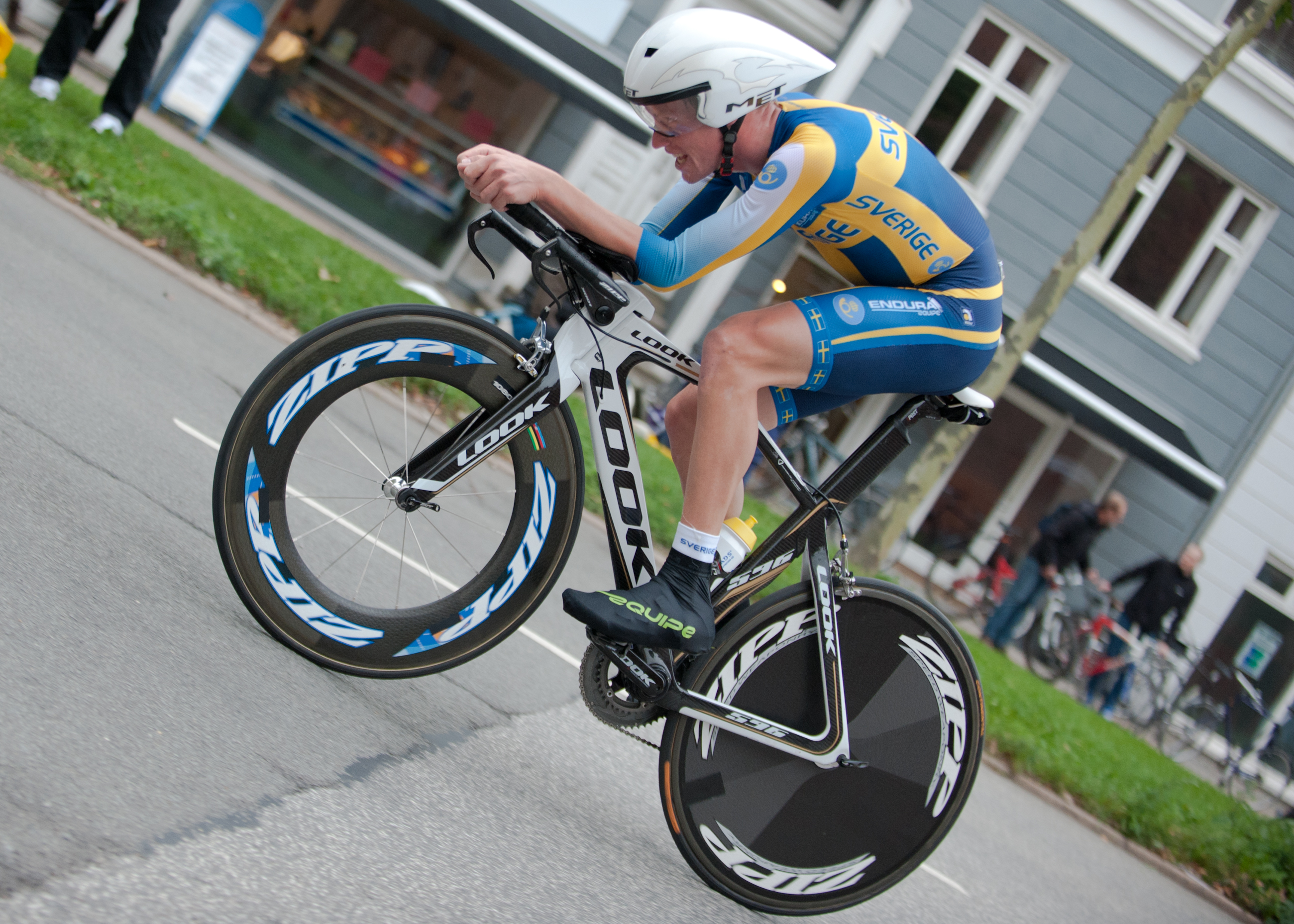
- Wetterhall, competing in the time trial, at the 2011 UCI Road World Championships.

Personal information
- Full name: Alexander Wetterhall
- Nickname: Ikea
- Born: 12 April 1986 (age 40) Gislaved, Sweden
- Height: 1.85 m (6 ft 1 in)
- Weight: 70 kg (154 lb)

Cycling career
- Sport: Cycling
- Disciplines: Road; Mountain biking
- Role: Rider
- Rider type: All-rounder

Amateur teams
- 2008: Team Cyclesport.se
- 2008: Pezula Racing (stagiaire)
- 2009: MagnusMaximusCoffee.com
- 2010: Team Sprocket
- 2010: Cervélo TestTeam (stagiaire)
- 2019: Tre Berg Cykelklubb

Professional teams
- 2011–2012: Endura Racing
- 2013: NetApp–Endura
- 2014: Firefighters Upsala CK
- 2015–2017: Team Tre Berg–Bianchi

Major wins
- One-day races and Classics National Time Trial Championships (2009, 2016)

Alexander Wetterhall (born 12 April 1986) is a Swedish road bicycle racer and mountain biker.

== Career ==
Born in Gislaved, Wetterhall was born with dysmelia of his feet, which needed several surgeries to be corrected.

He first competed as a professional in 2011, competing for Endura Racing prior to the squad's merger with Team NetApp for the 2013 season. He was the winner of the Swedish National Time Trial Championships in 2009, and 2016. Wetterhall is also a former winner of the Rás Tailteann, and the Ronde van Drenthe races.

For the 2014 season, Wetterhall joined the new Firefighters Upsala CK team. In November 2014 he was announced as part of the squad for the new Swedish outfit Team Tre Berg–Bianchi for the 2015 season.

== Major results ==
2004
1st Time trial, National Junior Mountain Bike Championships
2007
1st Team relay, National Mountain Bike Championships
2008
National Mountain Bike Championships

2nd Time trial
3rd Cross-country
3rd Team relay

2009
1st Time trial, National Road Championships
2010
1st Overall Rás Tailteann
1st Stage 1 Ringerike GP
2nd Västboloppet
4th Lincoln International GP
2011
3rd Time trial, National Road Championships
6th Overall Boucles de la Mayenne
2012
3rd Time trial, National Road Championships
5th Paris–Troyes
8th Tallinn–Tartu GP
10th Tartu GP
2013
1st Ronde van Drenthe
2014
National Road Championships

2nd Time trial
2nd Road race

2015
2nd Time trial, National Road Championships
3rd Overall Tour du Loir-et-Cher
2016
1st Time trial, National Road Championships
2017
National Road Championships

2nd Time trial
3rd Road race

9th Overall East Bohemia Tour
