= Jenny Algelid-Bengtsson =

Swedish cyclist

Personal information
- Born: 6 March 1976 (age 50) Kungälv, Sweden

Cycling career
- Sport: Cycling
- Discipline: Road cycling
- Role: Rider
- Rider type: Time trialist

Professional teams
- 1999-2000: Team Lolland-Falster
- 2001-2003: Equipe Nürnberger Versicherung

Jenny Algelid-Bengtsson (born 6 March 1976) is a road cyclist from Sweden. At the 1997 European Road Championships she won bronze in the under-23 women's time trial. She represented her nation at the 2000, 2001 and 2002 UCI Road World Championships.
