= Tuulikki Jahre =

Swedish cyclist

Personal information
- Born: Tuulikki Ryynänen; 11 August 1951 (age 75) Pielisjärvi, Pohjois-Karjala, Finland

Cycling career
- Sport: Cycling

Tuulikki Jahre (née Ryynänen; born 11 August 1951) is a Swedish former cyclist. She competed in the women's road race event at the 1984 Summer Olympics and won the silver medal in the road race at the 1980 UCI Road World Championships.

== Early life ==
Jahre was born in Pielisjärvi, Finland, moved to Sweden in 1961 and grew up in Färnäs, Sweden.
