= Nathalie Eklund (cyclist) =

Swedish cyclist (born 1991)

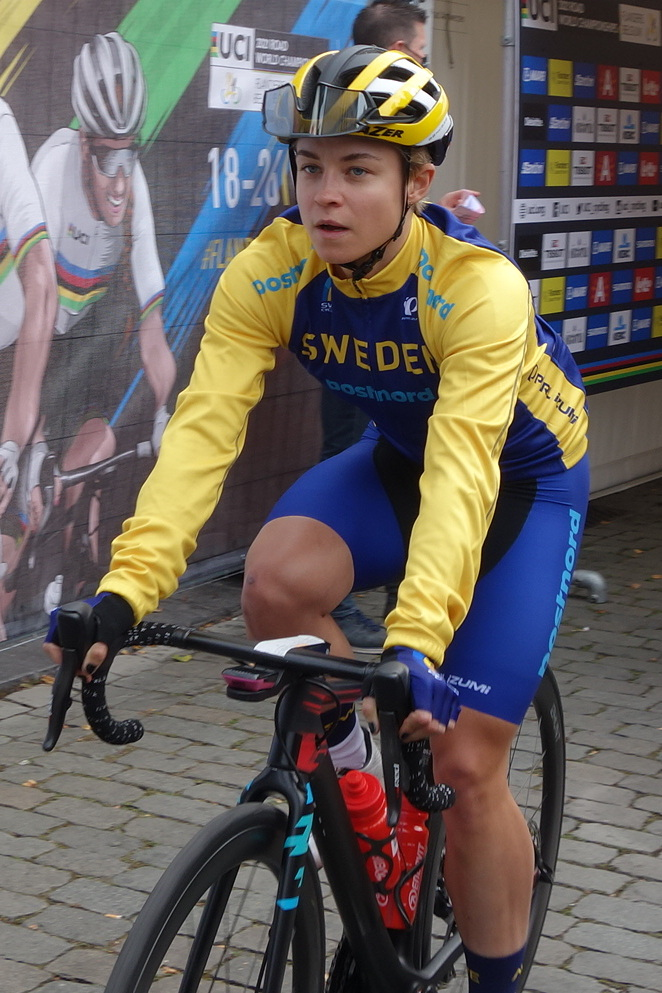
- Eklund in 2021

Personal information
- Born: 28 May 1991 (age 35) Stockholm, Sweden
- Height: 1.66 m (5 ft 5 in)
- Weight: 58 kg (128 lb)

Cycling career
- Sport: Cycling
- Discipline: Road
- Role: Rider

Professional teams
- 2021: GT Krush Tunap
- 2022: Massi–Tactic Women Team
- 2023–2024: Israel Premier Tech Roland

Major wins
- One-day races and Classics National Time Trial Championships (2021, 2022) National Road Race Championships (2020)

Nathalie Eklund (born 28 May 1991) is a Swedish professional racing cyclist, who last rode for UCI Women's WorldTeam Roland.

== Major results ==
2019
National Road Championships

2nd Time trial
3rd Road race

2020
National Road Championships

1st Road race
2nd Time trial

2021
1st Time trial, National Road Championships
4th Overall Belgrade GP Woman Tour
2022
National Road Championships

1st Time trial
4th Road race

1st Overall Tour of Uppsala

1st Stage 3

1st Overall Volta a Portugal

1st Prologue & Stages 1, 2 & 3

3rd La Picto–Charentaise
2023
National Road Championships

2nd Time trial
4th Road race
