= Sven Johansson (cyclist) =

Swedish cyclist

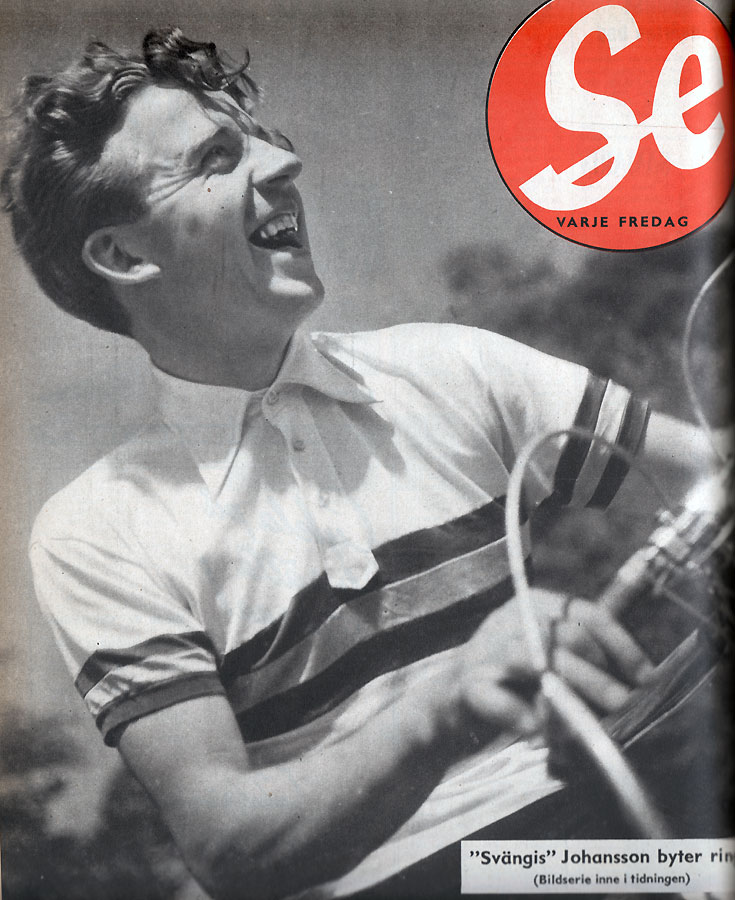
- Johansson on the back of Se magazine no 29, 1941.

Personal information
- Full name: Sven Folke Lennart Johansson
- Nickname: Svängis
- Born: 8 July 1914 Stockholm, Sweden
- Died: 12 October 1982 (aged 68) Stockholm, Sweden

Cycling career
- Sport: Cycling

Amateur team
- 1937–1950: Hammarby IF

Sven "Svängis" Folke Lennart Johansson (8 July 1914 – 12 October 1982) was a Swedish cyclist. He competed in the individual and team road race events at the 1936 Summer Olympics.
