= Bengt Asplund =

Swedish cyclist (born 1957)

Personal information
- Born: 30 March 1957 (age 69) Säffle, Sweden

Cycling career
- Sport: Cycling

Bengt Asplund (born 30 March 1957) is a Swedish former cyclist. He competed at the 1980 Summer Olympics and 1984 Summer Olympics.
