= Magnus Knutsson =

Swedish cyclist

Personal information
- Born: 12 March 1963 (age 63) Vänersborg, Sweden

Cycling career
- Sport: Cycling

Magnus Knutsson (born 12 March 1963) is a Swedish former cyclist. He competed in the team time trial event at the 1984 Summer Olympics.
