= Tour of Uppsala =

Race details
- Date: May
- Region: Sweden
- Discipline: Road
- Competition: UCI 2.1
- Type: Stage race
- Web site: upsalack.se

History
- First edition: 2018
- Editions: 3 (as of 2022)
- First winner: Ida Erngren (SWE)
- Most wins: No repeat winners
- Most recent: Nathalie Eklund (SWE)

The Tour of Uppsala is an annual professional road bicycle race for women in Sweden.

== Winners ==
| Year | Country | Rider | Team |
|---|---|---|---|
| 2018 | Sweden | Ida Erngren | Sweden (National team) |
| 2019 | Sweden | Sara Mustonen | Sweden (National team) |
| 2022 | Sweden | Nathalie Eklund | Sweden (National team) |
