= Swedish National Road Race Championships =

National road cycling championship in Sweden

The Swedish National Road Race Championships have been held since 1930.

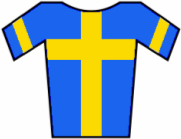

== Men ==
Year	Gold	Silver	Bronze
1930	Berndt Carlsson	-	-
1931	Arne Berg	-	-
1932	Gösta Björklund	-	-
1933	Bernhard Britz	-	-
1934	Berndt Carlsson	-	-
1935	Rudolf Gustavsson	-	-
1936	Ingvar Ericsson	-	-
1937	Martin Lundin	-	-
1938	Sven Johansson	-	-
1939	Ingvar Ericsson	-	-
1940	Ingvar Ericsson	-	-
1941	Sven Johansson	-	-
1942	Sture Andersson	-	-
1943	Harry Snell	-	-
1944	Harry Snell	Sture Andersson	Olle Wickholm
1945	Harry Jansson	Harry Snell	Sture Andersson
1946	Nils Johansson	Harry Snell	Olle Wänlund
1947	Sigge Larsson	Harry Snell	Sven Johansson
1948	Harry Snell	Sven Johansson	Nils Johansson
1949	Bengt Fröbom	Nils Johansson	Yngve Lundh
1950	Harry Snell	Sven Johansson	Olle Wänlund
1951	Stig Mårtensson	Harry Snell	Lars Nordwall
1952	Stig Mårtensson	Evert Lindgren	Lars Nordwall
1953	Axel Öhgren	Yngve Lundh	Sven Körberg
1954	Lars Carlén	Lars Nordwall	Owe Nordqvist
1955	Karl Johansson	Lars Nordwall	Sven Körberg
1956	Roland Ströhm	-	Lars Nordwall
1957	Uno Borgengârd	Karl-Ivar Andersson	Karl Johansson
1958	Gunnar Göransson	Karl-Ivar Andersson	Sven-Uno Stensson
1959	Owe Adamson	Nils Körberg	Bo Johansson
1960	Owe Adamson	Karl Johansson	Gunnar Göransson
1961	Owe Adamson	Sune Hansson	Göte Sundell
1962	Owe Adamson	Gösta Pettersson	Paul Munther
1963	Einar Björklund	Jupp Ripfel	Lennart Emanuelsson
1964	Sven Hamrin	Jupp Ripfel	Gösta Pettersson
1965	Jupp Ripfel	Sture Pettersson	Steve Tell
1966	Jupp Ripfel	Sune Wennlöf	Einar Björklund
1967	Erik Pettersson	Jupp Ripfel	Sune Wennlöf
1968	Curt Söderlund	Gösta Pettersson	Krister Persson
1969	Gösta Pettersson	Jan-Åke Ek	Curt Söderlund
1970	Jupp Ripfel	Sune Wennlöf	Krister Persson
1971	Jupp Ripfel	Sune Wennlöf	Leif Hansson
1972	Sven-Åke Nilsson	Ronnie Carlsson	Bernt Johansson
1973	Curt Söderlund	Sven-Åke Nilsson	Anders Gåvertsson
1974	Bernt Johansson	Leif Hansson	Sven-Åke Nilsson
1975	Roine Grönlund	Ronnie Carlsson	Alf Segersäll
1976	Tommy Prim	Mats Mikiver	Leif Hansson
1977	Alf Segersäll	Bengt Nilsson	Tord Filipsson
1978	Thomas Eriksson	Håkan Larsson	Bernt Scheler
1979	Lennart Fagerlund	Lars Eriksson	Bernt Scheler
1980	Bengt Asplund	Roy Almquist	Bernt Scheler
1981	Thomas Eriksson	Peter Jonsson	Peter Weberg
1982	Mårten Rosén	Per Christiansson	Anders Johansson
1983	Göran Barkfors	Patrick Serra	Thomas Eriksson
1984	Kjell Nilsson	Anders Johansson	Bengt Asplund
1985	Per Christiansson	Peter Jonsson	Lars Wahlqvist
1986	Lars Wahlqvist	Torbjörn Wallén	Anders Adamsson
1987	Björn Johansson	Michel Lafis	Kjell Hedman
1988	Anders Jarl	Michel Lafis	Per Moberg
1989	Bengt Ring	Allen Andersson	Lars Wahlqvist
1990	Anders Eklundh	Michel Lafis	Jan Karlsson
1991	Niklas Kindåker	Patrick Serra	Stefan Andersson
1992	Anders Eklundh	Per Strååt	Per-Anders Johansson
1993	Klas Johansson	Michael Andersson	Dan Kullgren
1994	Michael Andersson	Stefan Andersson	Daniel Sjöberg
1995	Glenn Magnusson	Daniel Sjöberg	Michel Lafis
1996	Marcus Ljungqvist	Michel Lafis	Henrik Sparr
1997	Michel Lafis	Glenn Magnusson	Johan Frederiksson
1998	Martin Rittsel	Michel Lafis	Michael Andersson
1999	Henrik Sparr	Martin Rittsel	Niklas Axelsson
2000	Stefan Adamsson	Magnus Bäckstedt	Michel Lafis
2001	Marcus Ljungqvist	Niklas Axelsson	Tobias Lergard
2002	Stefan Adamsson	Martin Rittsel	Jonas Olsson
2003	Jonas Holmkvist	Magnus Bäckstedt	Thomas Löfkvist
2004	Petter Renäng	Marcus Ljungqvist	Christofer Stevenson
2005	Jonas Ljungblad	Christofer Stevenson	Stefan Adamsson
2006	Thomas Löfkvist	Christofer Stevenson	Lucas Persson
2007	Magnus Bäckstedt	Johan Landström	Gustav Larsson
2008	Jonas Ljungblad	Niklas Axelsson	Thomas Löfkvist
2009	Marcus Ljungqvist	Fredrik Ericsson	Patrik Moren
2010	Michael Stevenson	Gustav Larsson	Michael Olsson
2011	Philip Lindau	Alexander Gingsjö	Marcus Johansson
2012	Christofer Stevenson	Lars Andersson	Fredrik Kessiakoff
2013	Michael Olsson	Petter Persson	Hakan-Bo Nilsson
2014	Michael Olsson	Alexander Wetterhall	Marcus Fåglum
2015	Alexander Gingsjö	Richard Larsén	Tobias Ludvigsson
2016	Richard Larsén	Niklas Gustavsson	Ludwig Bengtsson
2017	Kim Magnusson	Richard Larsén	Alexander Wetterhall
2018	Lucas Eriksson	Tobias Ludvigsson	Gustav Höög
2019	Lucas Eriksson	Tobias Ludvigsson	Erik Bergström Frisk
2020	Kim Magnusson	Jakob Eriksson	Lucas Eriksson
2021	Victor Hillerström Rundh	Richard Larsén	Lucas Eriksson
2022	Lucas Eriksson	Tobias Ludvigsson	Jakob Eriksson
2023	Lucas Eriksson	Hugo Forssell	Edvin Lovidius
2024	Jacob Eriksson	Joel Rydergren	Gabriel Sandör
2025	Hugo Forssell	Lucas Eriksson	Ville Merlöv
2026	Hugo Forssell	Anton Olars	Anton Karlsson

== Women ==
Year	Gold	Silver	Bronze
1972	Ann Pettersson		
1973	Tuulikki Jahre		
1974	Eva Johansson		
1975	Meeri Bodelid		
1976	Tuulikki Jahre		
1977	Tuulikki Jahre		
1978	Kristina Ranudd		
1979	Marianne Berglund		
1980	Anna-Karin Johansson		
1981	Maria Johnsson		
1982	Maria Johnsson		
1983	Kristina Ranudd		
1984	Marianne Berglund		
1985	Paula Westher		
1986	Paula Westher		
1987	Marianne Berglund		
1988	Marie Höljer		
1989	Marie Höljer		
1990	Elisabeth Westman		
1991	Marianne Berglund		
1992	Christina Vosveld	Elisabeth Westman	Marie Höljer
1993	Christina Vosveld	Elisabeth Westman	Marie Höljer
1994	Susanne Ljungskog	Marie Höljer	Helena Norrman
1995	Linda Hyden	Marie Höljer	Annelie Lundin
1996	Madeleine Lindberg	Marie Höljer	Madeleine Lindberg
1997	Madeleine Lindberg	Marie Höljer	Annelie Lundin
1998	Madeleine Lindberg	Marie Höljer	Madeleine Lindberg
1999	Madeleine Lindberg	Susanne Ljungskog	Marie Höljer
2000	Madeleine Lindberg	Susanne Ljungskog	Jenny Algelid
2001	Madeleine Lindberg	Maria Oestergren	Asa Hagberg
2002	Nathalie Visser	Veronica Andrèasson	Susanne Ljungskog
2003	Susanne Ljungskog	Madeleine Lindberg	Camilla Larsson
2004	Susanne Ljungskog	Monica Holler	Madeleine Lindberg
2005	Susanne Ljungskog	Maria Oestergren	Mirella Ehrin
2006	Susanne Ljungskog	Monica Holler	Karin Aune
2007	Angelica Agerteg	Linda Josefsson	Madelene Olsson
2008	Emilia Fahlin	Emma Johansson	Susanne Ljungskog
2009	Jennie Stenerhag	Karin Aune	Marie Lindberg
2010	Emma Johansson	Marie Lindberg	Sara Mustonen
2011	Emma Johansson	Jennie Stenerhag	Emilia Fahlin
2012	Emma Johansson	Emilia Fahlin	Isabelle Söderberg
2013	Emilia Fahlin	Emma Johansson	Jessica Kihlbom
2014	Emma Johansson	Malin Rydlund	Sara Mustonen
2015	Emma Johansson	Sara Mustonen	Hanna Nilsson
2016	Emma Johansson	Sara Mustonen	Emilia Fahlin
2017	Sara Penton	Ida Erngren	Hanna Nilsson
2018	Emilia Fahlin	Lisa Nordén	Sara Penton
2019	Lisa Nordén	Hanna Nilsson	Nathalie Eklund
2020	Nathalie Eklund	Emilia Fahlin	Matilda Frantzich
2021	Carin Winell	Hanna Johansson	Alexandra Nessmar
2022	Jenny Rissveds	Emilia Fahlin	Julia Borgström

== See also ==
- Swedish National Time Trial Championships
- National road cycling championships
