= 2019 Tour of Norway =

2019 UCI Europe Tour

Race details
- Dates: 28 May 2019 - 2 June 2019
- Stages: 6
- Distance: 1,081.1 km (671.8 mi)
- Winning time: 25h 19' 58"

Results
	Winner	Alexander Kristoff (NOR)	(UAE Team Emirates)
	Second	Kristoffer Halvorsen (NOR)	(Team Ineos)
	Third	Edvald Boasson Hagen (NOR)	(Team Dimension Data)
	Points	Alexander Kristoff (NOR)	(UAE Team Emirates)
	Mountains	Elmar Reinders (NED)	(Roompot–Charles)
	Youth	Kristoffer Halvorsen (NOR)	(Team Ineos)
	Team	Lotto–Soudal	

The 2019 Tour of Norway was a road cycling stage race that took place in Norway between 28 May 2019 and 2 June 2019. It was the ninth edition of the Tour of Norway and was rated as a 2.HC event as part of the 2019 UCI Europe Tour.

== Teams ==
21 teams participated in the race, including 11 UCI WorldTeams, 7 UCI Professional Continental teams, and 3 UCI Continental teams. Each team had a maximum of six riders:

UCI WorldTeams

- Astana
- Deceuninck–Quick-Step
- EF Education First
- Lotto–Soudal
- Mitchelton–Scott
- Team Dimension Data
- Team Ineos
- Team Jumbo–Visma
- Team Sunweb
- Trek–Segafredo
- UAE Team Emirates

UCI Professional Continental Teams

- Arkéa–Samsic
- Caja Rural–Seguros RGA
- Delko–Marseille Provence
- Israel Cycling Academy
- Riwal Readynez
- Roompot–Charles
- Sport Vlaanderen–Baloise

UCI Continental Teams

- Joker Fuel of Norway
- Team Coop
- Uno-X Norwegian Development Team

== Route ==
Stage characteristics and winners
Stage	Date	Course	Distance	Type	Stage winner
1	28 May	Stavanger to Egersund	168.2 km (104.5 mi)	Flat stage	Cees Bol (NED)
2	29 May	Kvinesdal to Mandal	174 km (108 mi)	Flat stage	Álvaro Hodeg (COL)
3	30 May	Lyngdal to Kristiansand	179.7 km (111.7 mi)	Hilly stage	Edvald Boasson Hagen (NOR)
4	31 May	Arendal to Sandefjord	224.4 km (139.4 mi)	Hilly stage	Edoardo Affini (ITA)
5	1 June	Skien to Drammen	159.7 km (99.2 mi)	Flat stage	Alexander Kristoff (NOR)
6	2 June	Gran to Hønefoss	175.1 km (108.8 mi)	Hilly stage	Kristoffer Halvorsen (NOR)
Total		1,081.1 km (671.8 mi)			

== Stages ==
=== Stage 1 ===
28 May 2019 — Stavanger to Egersund, 168.2 km (104.5 miles)

Stage 1 result
Rank	Rider	Team	Time
1	Cees Bol (NED)	Team Sunweb	3h 55' 12"
2	Eduard-Michael Grosu (ROM)	Delko–Marseille Provence	+ 0"
3	Alexander Kristoff (NOR)	UAE Team Emirates	+ 0"
4	Lawrence Naesen (BEL)	Lotto–Soudal	+ 0"
5	Kristoffer Halvorsen (NOR)	Team Ineos	+ 0"
6	Moreno Hofland (NED)	EF Education First	+ 0"
7	Trond Trondsen (NOR)	Team Coop	+ 0"
8	Tom Van Asbroeck (BEL)	Israel Cycling Academy	+ 0"
9	Matteo Malucelli (ITA)	Caja Rural–Seguros RGA	+ 0"
10	Tim Wellens (BEL)	Lotto–Soudal	+ 0"

General classification after Stage 1
Rank	Rider	Team	Time
1	Cees Bol (NED)	Team Sunweb	3h 55' 02"
2	Eduard-Michael Grosu (ROM)	Delko–Marseille Provence	+ 4"
3	Alexander Kristoff (NOR)	UAE Team Emirates	+ 6"
4	Jacob Eriksson (SWE)	Team Coop	+ 9"
5	Lawrence Naesen (BEL)	Lotto–Soudal	+ 10"
6	Kristoffer Halvorsen (NOR)	Team Ineos	+ 10"
7	Moreno Hofland (NED)	EF Education First	+ 10"
8	Trond Trondsen (NOR)	Team Coop	+ 10"
9	Tom Van Asbroeck (BEL)	Israel Cycling Academy	+ 10"
10	Matteo Malucelli (ITA)	Caja Rural–Seguros RGA	+ 10"

=== Stage 2 ===
29 May 2019 — Kvinesdal to Mandal, 174 km (108.1 miles)

Stage 2 result
Rank	Rider	Team	Time
1	Álvaro Hodeg (COL)	Deceuninck–Quick-Step	4h 09' 18"
2	Kristoffer Halvorsen (NOR)	Team Ineos	+ 0"
3	Edvald Boasson Hagen (NOR)	Team Dimension Data	+ 0"
4	Alexander Kristoff (NOR)	UAE Team Emirates	+ 0"
5	Alex Kirsch (LUX)	Trek–Segafredo	+ 0"
6	Eduard-Michael Grosu (ROM)	Delko–Marseille Provence	+ 0"
7	Tom Van Asbroeck (BEL)	Israel Cycling Academy	+ 0"
8	Cees Bol (NED)	Team Sunweb	+ 0"
9	Luka Mezgec (SLO)	Mitchelton–Scott	+ 0"
10	Boy van Poppel (NED)	Roompot–Charles	+ 0"

General classification after Stage 2
Rank	Rider	Team	Time
1	Cees Bol (NED)	Team Sunweb	8h 04' 20"
2	Álvaro Hodeg (COL)	Deceuninck–Quick-Step	+ 0"
3	Kristoffer Halvorsen (NOR)	Team Ineos	+ 4"
4	Eduard-Michael Grosu (ROM)	Delko–Marseille Provence	+ 4"
5	Franck Bonnamour (FRA)	Arkéa–Samsic	+ 5"
6	Alexander Kristoff (NOR)	UAE Team Emirates	+ 6"
7	Edvald Boasson Hagen (NOR)	Team Dimension Data	+ 6"
8	Taco van der Hoorn (NED)	Team Jumbo–Visma	+ 7"
9	Markus Hoelgaard (NOR)	Uno-X Norwegian Development Team	+ 7"
10	Omer Goldstein (ISR)	Israel Cycling Academy	+ 9"

=== Stage 3 ===
30 May 2019 — Lyngdal to Kristiansand, 179.7 km (111.7 miles)

Stage 3 result
Rank	Rider	Team	Time
1	Edvald Boasson Hagen (NOR)	Team Dimension Data	4h 25' 47"
2	Joris Nieuwenhuis (NED)	Team Sunweb	+ 2"
3	Alexander Kristoff (NOR)	UAE Team Emirates	+ 3"
4	Cees Bol (NED)	Team Sunweb	+ 3"
5	Alex Kirsch (LUX)	Trek–Segafredo	+ 3"
6	Davide Martinelli (ITA)	Deceuninck–Quick-Step	+ 3"
7	Luka Mezgec (SLO)	Mitchelton–Scott	+ 3"
8	Tom Van Asbroeck (BEL)	Israel Cycling Academy	+ 3"
9	Kristoffer Halvorsen (NOR)	Team Ineos	+ 3"
10	Marc Hirschi (SUI)	Team Sunweb	+ 3"

General classification after Stage 3
Rank	Rider	Team	Time
1	Edvald Boasson Hagen (NOR)	Team Dimension Data	12h 30' 03"
2	Cees Bol (NED)	Team Sunweb	+ 7"
3	Alexander Kristoff (NOR)	UAE Team Emirates	+ 9"
4	Joris Nieuwenhuis (NED)	Team Sunweb	+ 10"
5	Kristoffer Halvorsen (NOR)	Team Ineos	+ 11"
6	Franck Bonnamour (FRA)	Arkéa–Samsic	+ 12"
7	Taco van der Hoorn (NED)	Team Jumbo–Visma	+ 14"
8	Markus Hoelgaard (NOR)	Uno-X Norwegian Development Team	+ 14"
9	Omer Goldstein (ISR)	Israel Cycling Academy	+ 16"
10	Jacob Eriksson (SWE)	Team Coop	+ 16"

=== Stage 4 ===
31 May 2019 — Arendal to Sandefjord, 224.4 km (139.4 miles)

Stage 4 result
Rank	Rider	Team	Time
1	Edoardo Affini (ITA)	Mitchelton–Scott	5h 07' 30"
2	Anders Skaarseth (NOR)	Uno-X Norwegian Development Team	+ 0"
3	Sander Armée (BEL)	Lotto–Soudal	+ 0"
4	Rasmus Quaade (DEN)	Riwal Readynez	+ 0"
5	Daniel Turek (CZE)	Israel Cycling Academy	+ 0"
6	Alexander Kristoff (NOR)	UAE Team Emirates	+ 7"
7	Yves Lampaert (BEL)	Deceuninck–Quick-Step	+ 7"
8	Tom Van Asbroeck (BEL)	Israel Cycling Academy	+ 7"
9	Ben Swift (GBR)	Team Ineos	+ 7"
10	Eduard-Michael Grosu (ROM)	Delko–Marseille Provence	+ 7"

General classification after Stage 4
Rank	Rider	Team	Time
1	Edvald Boasson Hagen (NOR)	Team Dimension Data	17h 37' 40"
2	Edoardo Affini (ITA)	Mitchelton–Scott	+ 0"
3	Cees Bol (NED)	Team Sunweb	+ 7"
4	Alexander Kristoff (NOR)	UAE Team Emirates	+ 8"
5	Anders Skaarseth (NOR)	Uno-X Norwegian Development Team	+ 9"
6	Joris Nieuwenhuis (NED)	Team Sunweb	+ 10"
7	Daniel Turek (CZE)	Israel Cycling Academy	+ 10"
8	Sander Armée (BEL)	Lotto–Soudal	+ 10"
9	Kristoffer Halvorsen (NOR)	Team Ineos	+ 11"
10	Franck Bonnamour (FRA)	Arkéa–Samsic	+ 12"

=== Stage 5 ===
1 June 2019 — Skien to Drammen, 159.7 km (99.2 miles)

Stage 5 result
Rank	Rider	Team	Time
1	Alexander Kristoff (NOR)	UAE Team Emirates	3h 39' 44"
2	Álvaro Hodeg (COL)	Deceuninck–Quick-Step	+ 0"
3	Kristoffer Halvorsen (NOR)	Team Ineos	+ 0"
4	Edvald Boasson Hagen (NOR)	Team Dimension Data	+ 0"
5	Yves Lampaert (BEL)	Deceuninck–Quick-Step	+ 0"
6	Moreno Hofland (NED)	EF Education First	+ 0"
7	Alex Frame (NZL)	Trek–Segafredo	+ 0"
8	Lawrence Naesen (BEL)	Lotto–Soudal	+ 0"
9	Luka Mezgec (SLO)	Mitchelton–Scott	+ 0"
10	Tom Van Asbroeck (BEL)	Israel Cycling Academy	+ 0"

General classification after Stage 5
Rank	Rider	Team	Time
1	Alexander Kristoff (NOR)	UAE Team Emirates	21h 17' 22"
2	Edvald Boasson Hagen (NOR)	Team Dimension Data	+ 1"
3	Edoardo Affini (ITA)	Mitchelton–Scott	+ 2"
4	Kristoffer Halvorsen (NOR)	Team Ineos	+ 9"
5	Cees Bol (NED)	Team Sunweb	+ 9"
6	Anders Skaarseth (NOR)	Uno-X Norwegian Development Team	+ 11"
7	Joris Nieuwenhuis (NED)	Team Sunweb	+ 12"
8	Daniel Turek (CZE)	Israel Cycling Academy	+ 12"
9	Sander Armée (BEL)	Lotto–Soudal	+ 12"
10	Franck Bonnamour (FRA)	Arkéa–Samsic	+ 14"

=== Stage 6 ===
2 June 2019 — Gran to Hønefoss, 175.1 km (108.8 miles)

Stage 6 result
Rank	Rider	Team	Time
1	Kristoffer Halvorsen (NOR)	Team Ineos	4h 02' 40"
2	Cees Bol (NED)	Team Sunweb	+ 0"
3	Alexander Kristoff (NOR)	UAE Team Emirates	+ 0"
4	Luka Mezgec (SLO)	Mitchelton–Scott	+ 0"
5	Ben Swift (GBR)	Team Ineos	+ 0"
6	Yves Lampaert (BEL)	Deceuninck–Quick-Step	+ 0"
7	Alex Kirsch (LUX)	Trek–Segafredo	+ 0"
8	Joris Nieuwenhuis (NED)	Team Sunweb	+ 0"
9	August Jensen (NOR)	Israel Cycling Academy	+ 0"
10	Edoardo Affini (ITA)	Mitchelton–Scott	+ 0"

== Classification leadership ==
Classification leadership by stage
Stage	Winner	General classification	Points classification	Mountains classification	Young rider classification	Teams classification
1	Cees Bol	Cees Bol	Cees Bol	Fridtjof Røinås	Jacob Eriksson	Lotto–Soudal
2	Álvaro Hodeg	Cees Bol	Kristoffer Halvorsen	Henrik Evensen	Álvaro Hodeg	Team Sunweb
3	Edvald Boasson Hagen	Edvald Boasson Hagen	Alexander Kristoff	Markus Hoelgaard	Joris Nieuwenhuis	Team Sunweb
4	Edoardo Affini	Edvald Boasson Hagen	Alexander Kristoff	Markus Hoelgaard	Edoardo Affini	Lotto–Soudal
5	Alexander Kristoff	Alexander Kristoff	Alexander Kristoff	Elmar Reinders	Edoardo Affini	Lotto–Soudal
6	Kristoffer Halvorsen	Alexander Kristoff	Alexander Kristoff	Elmar Reinders	Kristoffer Halvorsen	Lotto–Soudal
Final		Alexander Kristoff	Alexander Kristoff	Elmar Reinders	Kristoffer Halvorsen	Lotto–Soudal

== Final standings ==
=== General classification ===
Final general classification
Rank	Rider	Team	Time
1	Alexander Kristoff (NOR)	UAE Team Emirates	25h 19' 58"
2	Kristoffer Halvorsen (NOR)	Team Ineos	+ 3"
3	Edvald Boasson Hagen (NOR)	Team Dimension Data	+ 5"
4	Edoardo Affini (ITA)	Mitchelton–Scott	+ 6"
5	Cees Bol (NED)	Team Sunweb	+ 7"
6	Anders Skaarseth (NOR)	Uno-X Norwegian Development Team	+ 15"
7	Joris Nieuwenhuis (NED)	Team Sunweb	+ 16"
8	Daniel Turek (CZE)	Israel Cycling Academy	+ 16"
9	Sander Armée (BEL)	Lotto–Soudal	+ 16"
10	Carl Fredrik Hagen (NOR)	Lotto–Soudal	+ 17"

=== Points classification ===
Final points classification
Rank	Rider	Team	Points
1	Alexander Kristoff (NOR)	UAE Team Emirates	77
2	Kristoffer Halvorsen (NOR)	Team Ineos	64
3	Cees Bol (NED)	Team Sunweb	56
4	Edvald Boasson Hagen (NOR)	Team Dimension Data	46
5	Tom Van Asbroeck (BEL)	Israel Cycling Academy	42
6	Alex Kirsch (LUX)	Trek–Segafredo	36
7	Luka Mezgec (SLO)	Mitchelton–Scott	35
8	Álvaro Hodeg (COL)	Deceuninck–Quick-Step	33
9	Yves Lampaert (BEL)	Deceuninck–Quick-Step	33
10	Lawrence Naesen (BEL)	Lotto–Soudal	29

=== Mountains classification ===
Final mountains classification
Rank	Rider	Team	Points
1	Elmar Reinders (NED)	Roompot–Charles	20
2	Marc Hirschi (SUI)	Team Sunweb	19
3	Bjorg Lambrecht (BEL)	Lotto–Soudal	16
4	Markus Hoelgaard (NOR)	Uno-X Norwegian Development Team	13
5	Remco Evenepoel (BEL)	Deceuninck–Quick-Step	13
6	Tim Wellens (BEL)	Lotto–Soudal	10
7	Andreas Vangstad (NOR)	Joker Fuel of Norway	9
8	Nikita Stalnov (KAZ)	Astana	9
9	Carl Fredrik Hagen (NOR)	Lotto–Soudal	9
10	Tom Van Asbroeck (BEL)	Israel Cycling Academy	9

=== Young rider classification ===
Final young rider general classification
Rank	Rider	Team	Time
1	Kristoffer Halvorsen (NOR)	Team Ineos	25h 20' 01"
2	Edoardo Affini (ITA)	Mitchelton–Scott	+ 3"
3	Joris Nieuwenhuis (NED)	Team Sunweb	+ 13"
4	Marc Hirschi (SUI)	Team Sunweb	+ 17"
5	Jacob Eriksson (SWE)	Team Coop	+ 19"
6	Bjorg Lambrecht (BEL)	Lotto–Soudal	+ 20"
7	Milan Menten (BEL)	Sport Vlaanderen–Baloise	+ 20"
8	Lucas Eriksson (SWE)	Riwal Readynez	+ 20"
9	Yevgeniy Gidich (KAZ)	Astana	+ 41"
10	Alessandro Fedeli (ITA)	Delko–Marseille Provence	+ 1' 43"

=== Teams classification ===
Final teams classification
Rank	Team	Time
1	Lotto–Soudal	76h 00' 56"
2	Israel Cycling Academy	+ 0"
3	Mitchelton–Scott	+ 0"
4	Uno-X Norwegian Development Team	+ 0"
5	Team Sunweb	+ 6"
6	Team Ineos	+ 7"
7	Astana	+ 28"
8	Deceuninck–Quick-Step	+ 3' 58"
9	UAE Team Emirates	+ 4' 14"
10	Arkéa–Samsic	+ 4' 52"
