= Eton Shirts =

Swedish clothing brand

Eton AB
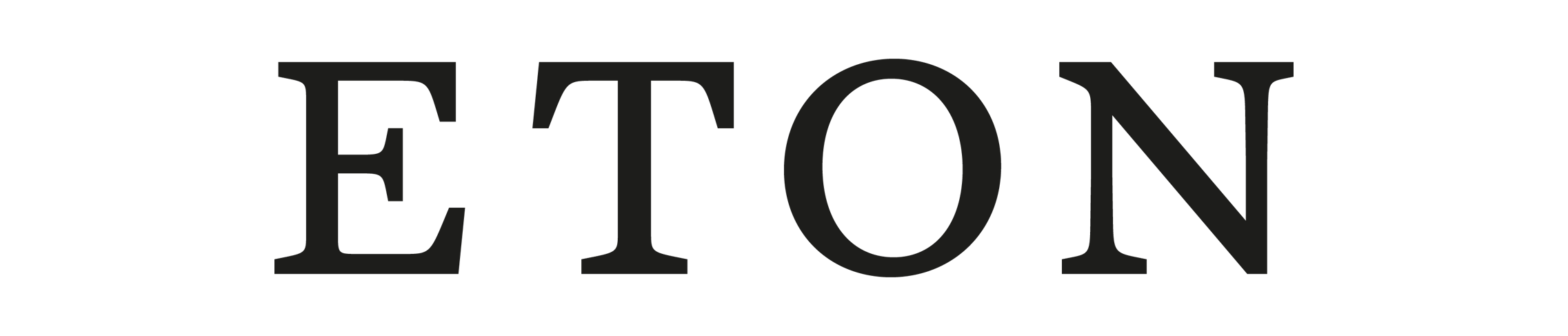

- Eton store display at Göteborg Landvetter Airport in 2019
- Company type: Private (Aktiebolag)
- Industry: Clothing
- Founded: 1928 in Gånghester, Sweden
- Founders: Annie Petterson; David Petterson
- Headquarters: Gånghester, Sweden
- Area served: Worldwide
- Key people: David Thörewik (CEO); Erik Wilkinson (CSO)
- Products: Luxury men's shirts and accessories
- Owner: EQT AB (85%)
- Number of employees: 250 (2018)
- Website: etonshirts.com

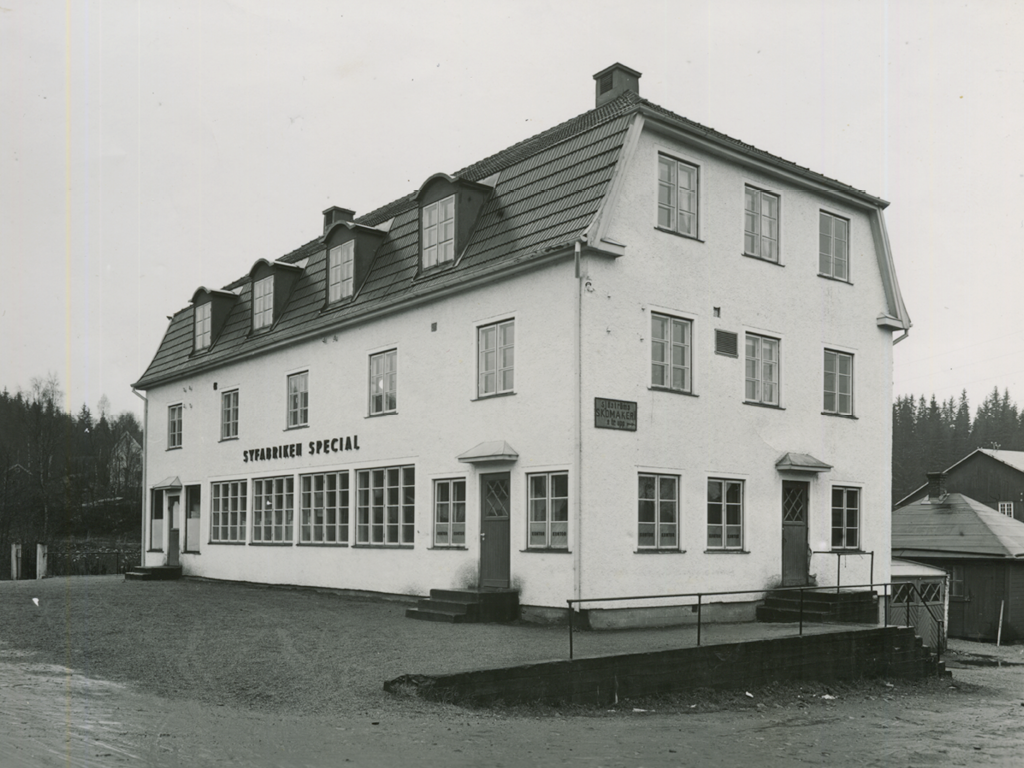
The Syfabriken Special factory

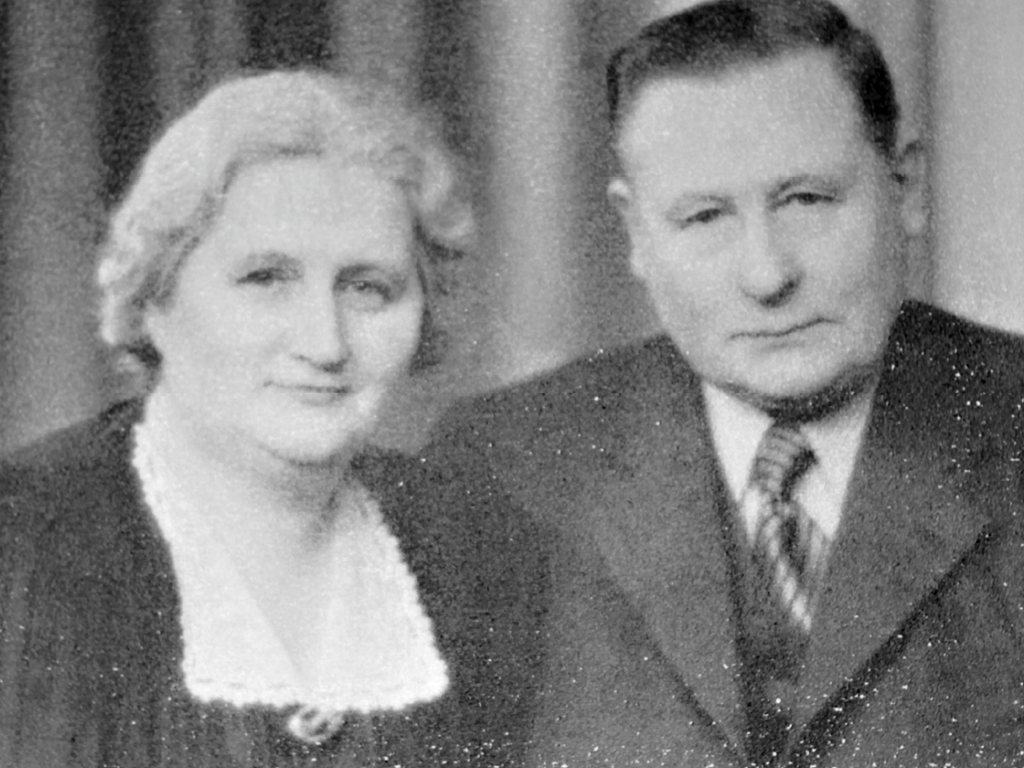
Annie and David Pettersson

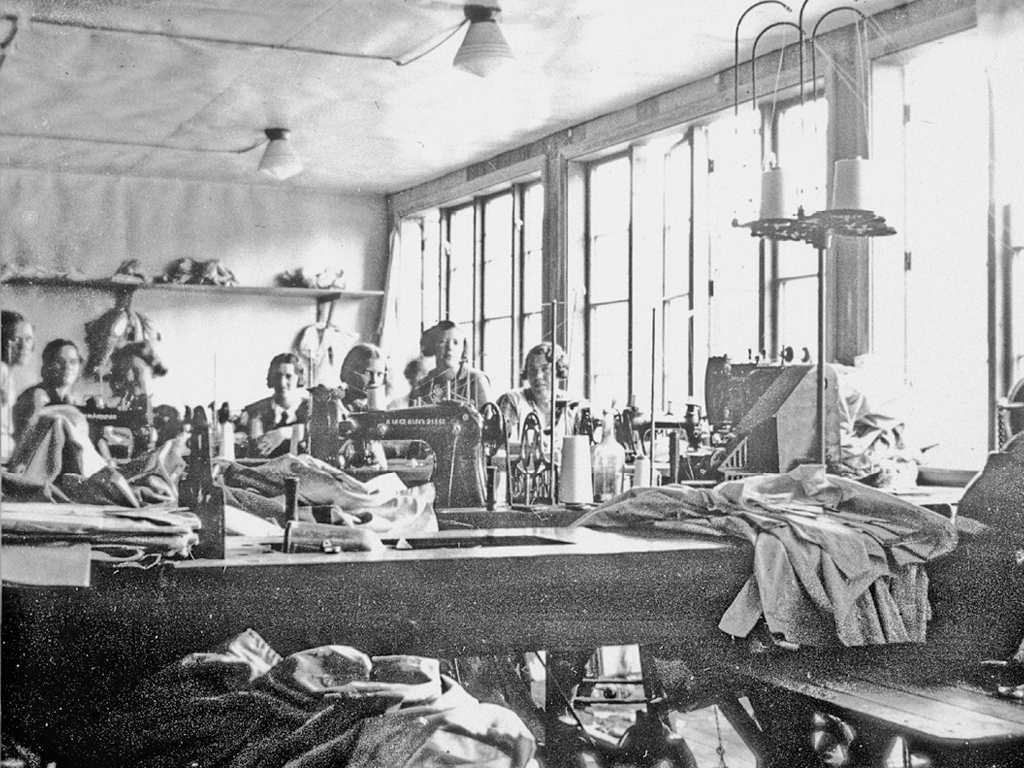
Seamstresses in the factory

Eton AB is a Swedish manufacturer of luxury men's shirts. It was founded in 1928 by David and Annie Petterson in the small village of Gånghester in Sweden. Eton is now a global brand, being sold in more than 1,500 stores in over 50 countries, with flagship stores in Stockholm, Frankfurt, London and New York.

== History ==
=== Early history ===
During the 1920s, Annie Petterson started to sew dresses in the family kitchen. When the Great Depression forced her husband David to close down the family sawmill, he joined his wife's quickly growing business. The company was originally called Syfabriken Special (Specialized Sewing Factory). With an increasing focus on men's shirts, the company soon changed its name to Skjortfabriken Special (Specialized Shirt Factory).

=== 1950–2000 ===
At the beginning of the 1950s, Skjortfabriken Special launched the so-called "Eton shirt", created with inspiration from the famous Eton College. In the mid-1950s, export started to Great Britain but since Skjortfabriken Special was difficult to pronounce for non-Swedes, "Eton" was adopted as the company name.

In connection with the international expansion, a new and modern factory was built in Gånghester. The building still functions as the company headquarters. During the 1980s, Eton started working to offer high quality, premium shirts.

In 1992, Eton presented, after a collaboration with Swiss experts, the world's first non-iron shirt in 100% cotton. The first reseller was the British department store Harrods, which sold more than 600 shirts the first week alone.

=== 2001–present ===
In 2012, family-owned Eton was acquired by the Swedish private equity firm Litorina. In 2016, Swedish private equity group EQT AB became Eton's new owner.

== Key people ==
Hans Davidson, grandson to the founders Annie and David Petterson, was the CEO between 1989-2019. At the beginning of 2019, Eton announced that Hans Davidson, after more than 30 years as acting CEO, would step down and hand over the role to David Thörewik, former managing director at Weekday, one of the independent brands in the H&M group.

== Operations ==
Eton has its own branded stores in Europe and the United States, including an official online store. It is represented by more than 1500 resellers as of 2018, including department stores Harrods, Selfridges, Nordstrom, Saks Fifth Avenue, Neiman Marcus, Harry Rosen Inc, Le Bon Marché, El Corte Inglés, La Rinascente and KaDeWe.

Besides its Gånghester headquarters, Eton has offices in Stockholm, Düsseldorf, Cantù, London, New York, and Atlanta. The turnover for 2018 was a record high, with double-digit growth.
