= Christofer Stevenson =

Swedish cyclist

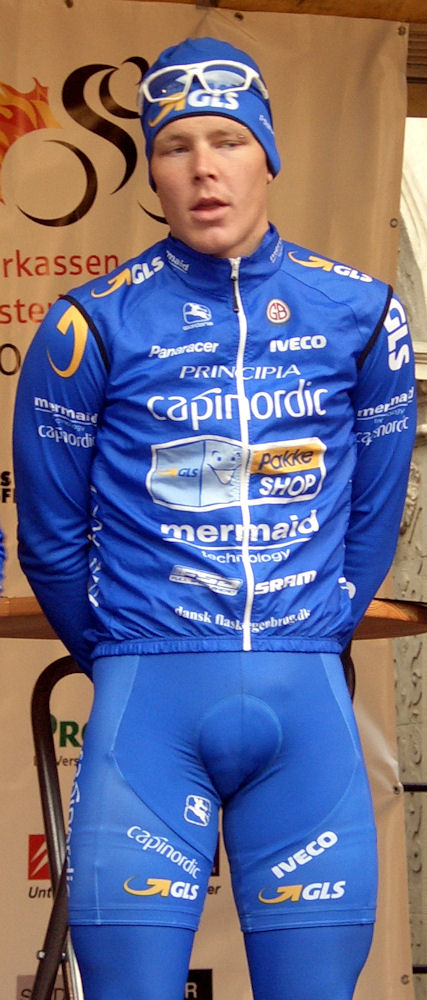
- Stevenson in 2008

Personal information
- Full name: Christofer Stevenson
- Born: 25 April 1982 (age 44) Gothenburg, Sweden

Cycling career
- Sport: Cycling
- Current team: Retired
- Discipline: Road
- Role: Rider

Amateur teams
- 2004: AVC Aix-en-Provence
- 2014: Motala AIF CK

Professional teams
- 2006: Amore & Vita–McDonald's (stagiaire)
- 2007: Amore & Vita–McDonald's
- 2008–2009: Team GLS–Pakke Shop
- 2010–2011: Sparebanken Vest–Ridley
- 2012: Team UK Youth
- 2013: Concordia Forsikring–Riwal

Christofer Stevenson (born 25 April 1982) is a Swedish former professional cyclist.

== Major results ==
2000
1st Road race, National Junior Road Championships
2004
3rd Road race, National Road Championships
2005
1st Scandinavian Open Road Race
2nd Road race, National Road Championships
5th Tartu GP
2006
2nd Road race, National Road Championships
2008
1st Overall Tour du Loir-et-Cher
3rd Overall Tour de Normandie
2009
2nd Scandinavian Race Uppsala
4th Overall Olympia's Tour

1st Stage 3

7th Overall Tour du Loir-et-Cher
8th Philadelphia International Championship
2010
7th Scandinavian Race Uppsala
2011
4th GP Herning
4th Rogaland GP
2012
1st Road race, National Road Championships
2015
4th Scandinavian Race Uppsala
