= Kim Magnusson (cyclist) =

Swedish cyclist

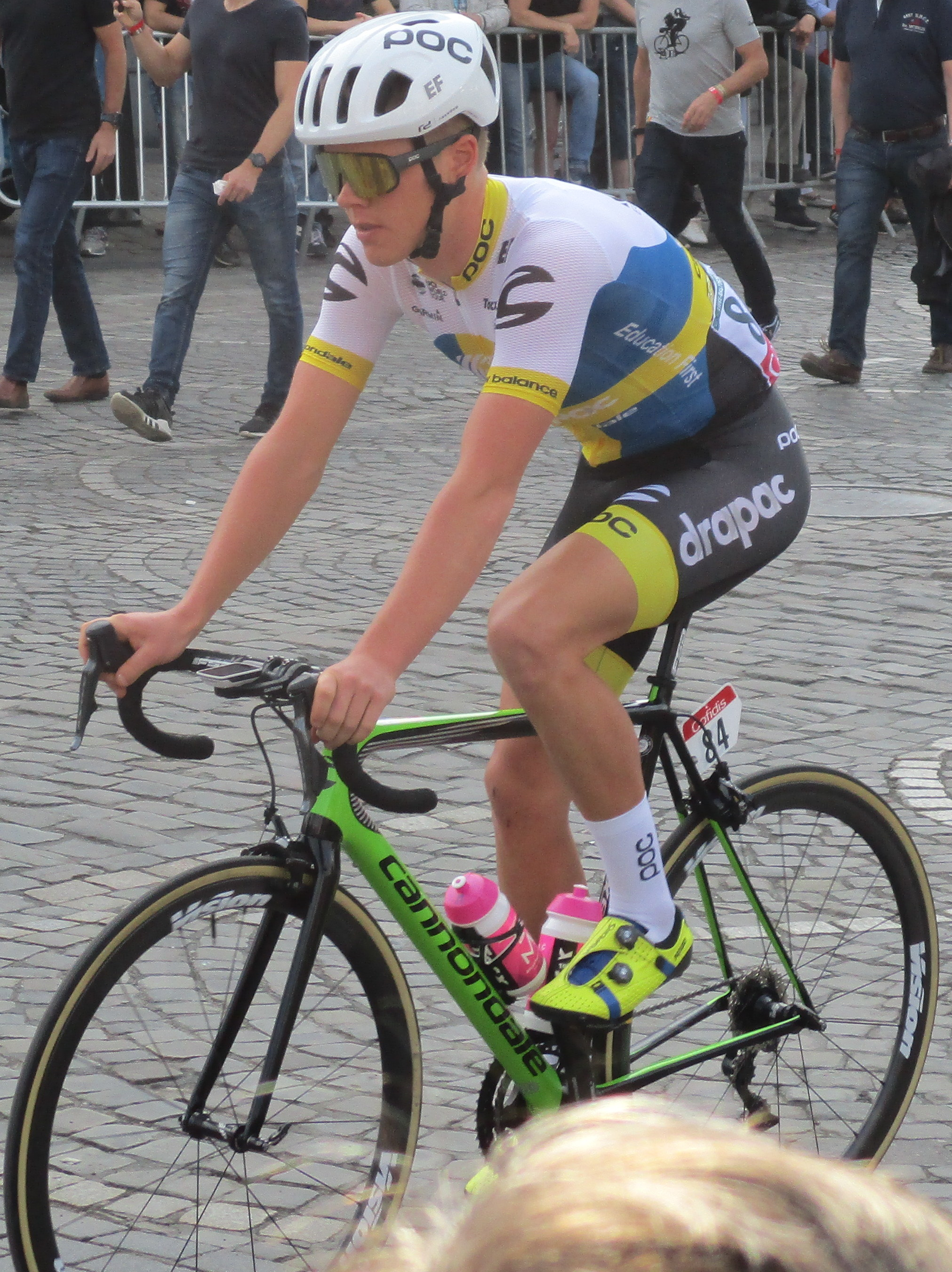
- Magnusson in 2018.

Personal information
- Full name: Kim Magnusson
- Born: 31 August 1992 (age 34) Skövde, Sweden

Cycling career
- Sport: Cycling
- Current team: Riwal Cycling Team
- Discipline: Road
- Role: Rider
- Rider type: Classics specialist

Professional teams
- 2014: Vini Fantini–Nippo
- 2015–2017: Team Tre Berg–Bianchi
- 2018: EF Education First–Drapac p/b Cannondale
- 2019–: Riwal Readynez

Major wins
- One-day races and Classics National Road Race Championships (2017, 2020)

Kim Magnusson (born 31 August 1992) is a Swedish professional road racing cyclist, who currently rides for UCI Continental team Riwal Cycling Team. He had been a member of UCI WorldTeam EF Education First–Drapac p/b Cannondale in 2018, initially signing a two-year contract, but left the team after only one season.

His father, Glenn Magnusson, also competed as a professional road racing cyclist between 1996 and 2001, winning three stages at the Giro d'Italia.

== Major results ==
2017
1st Road race, National Road Championships
5th Kalmar Grand Prix
8th Overall East Bohemia Tour
2018
5th Road race, National Road Championships
2020
1st Road race, National Road Championships
2021
6th Overall Kreiz Breizh Elites
