= Michael Stevenson (cyclist) =

Swedish cyclist

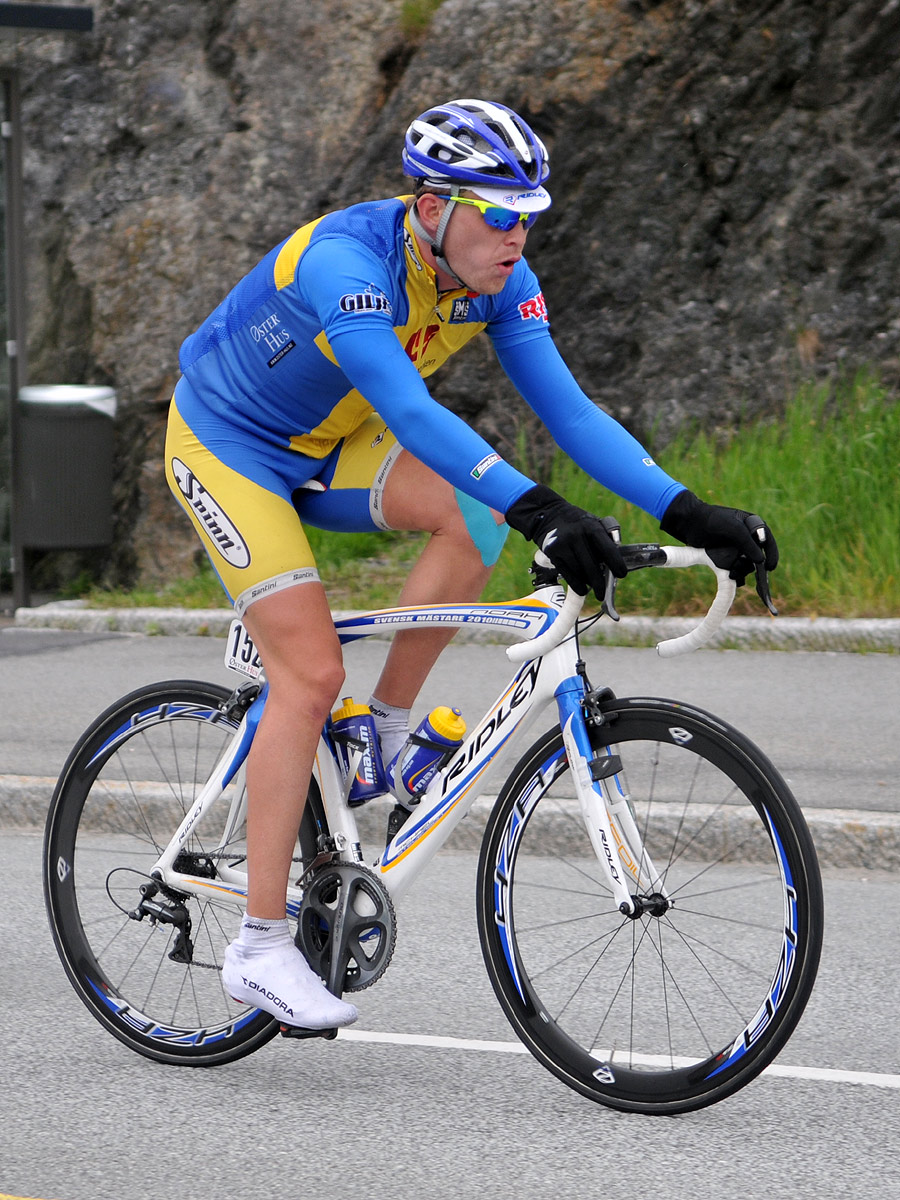
- Stevenson in 2011

Personal information
- Full name: Michael Stevenson
- Born: July 10, 1984 (age 42) Saffle, Sweden

Cycling career
- Sport: Cycling
- Current team: Retired
- Discipline: Road
- Role: Rider

Amateur team
- 2014: Motala AIF CK

Professional teams
- 2004: CK Kronborg Pro
- 2006–2008: Amore & Vita–McDonald's
- 2009: Sparebanken Vest–Ridley
- 2010–2013: Concordia Forsikring–Himmerland

Michael Stevenson (born July 10, 1984) is a Swedish former professional cyclist.

== Major results ==
2010
1st Road race, National Road Championships
2nd Tour de la Somme
2011
3rd Scandinavian Race Uppsala
