= 2021 Danmark Rundt =

2021 UCI Europe Tour 2021 UCI ProSeries

Race details
- Dates: 10 – 14 August 2021
- Stages: 5
- Distance: 783.3 km (486.7 mi)
- Winning time: 17h 19' 17"

Results
Jersey awarded to the overall winner	Winner	Remco Evenepoel (BEL)	(Deceuninck–Quick-Step)
	Second	Mads Pedersen (DEN)	(Trek–Segafredo)
	Third	Mike Teunissen (NED)	(Team Jumbo–Visma)
Jersey awarded to the points classification winner	Points	Mads Pedersen (DEN)	(Trek–Segafredo)
Jersey awarded to the mountains classification winner	Mountains	Rasmus Bøgh Wallin (DEN)	(Team PostNord Danmark)
Jersey awarded to the youth classification winner	Youth	Remco Evenepoel (BEL)	(Deceuninck–Quick-Step)
Jersey awarded to the combativity classification winner	Combativity	Rasmus Bøgh Wallin (DEN)	(Team PostNord Danmark)
	Team	(United States) Trek–Segafredo	

The 2021 Danmark Rundt (officially PostNord Danmark Rundt 2021 for sponsorship reasons) was a men's road bicycle race which was held from 10 to 14 August 2021. It was the 30th edition of Danmark Rundt, which was rated as a 2.Pro event on the 2021 UCI Europe Tour and the 2021 UCI ProSeries calendars. This edition was the race's first in the UCI ProSeries; the 2020 edition was expected to feature in the inaugural UCI ProSeries but was cancelled due to the COVID-19 pandemic. The race was made up of five stages over five days and concluded with an individual time trial in the traditional finishing town of Frederiksberg.

== Teams ==
Six UCI WorldTeams, seven UCI ProTeams, five UCI Continental teams and the Danish national team (competing as Team Postnord Danmark) made up the nineteen teams that participated in the race. Lotto–Soudal, with five riders, was the only team to not enter a full squad of seven riders. In total, 131 riders started the race, of which 105 riders finished the race.

UCI WorldTeams

- Deceuninck–Quick-Step
- Lotto–Soudal
- Team DSM
- Team Jumbo–Visma
- Team Qhubeka NextHash
- Trek–Segafredo

UCI ProTeams

- Bardiani–CSF–Faizanè
- Bingoal Pauwels Sauces WB
- Rally Cycling
- Sport Vlaanderen–Baloise
- Team Novo Nordisk
- Uno-X Pro Cycling Team
- Vini Zabù

UCI Continental Teams

- BHS–PL Beton Bornholm
- HRE Mazowsze Serce Polski
- Restaurant Suri–Carl Ras
- Riwal Cycling Team
- Team ColoQuick

National Teams

- Team PostNord Danmark

== Schedule ==
Stage characteristics and winners
Stage	Date	Route	Distance	Type	Stage winner
1	10 August	Struer to Esbjerg	175.3 km (108.9 mi)	Flat stage	Dylan Groenewegen (NED)
2	11 August	Ribe to Sønderborg	189.6 km (117.8 mi)	Flat stage	Mads Pedersen (DEN)
3	12 August	Tønder to Vejle	219.2 km (136.2 mi)	Hilly stage	Remco Evenepoel (BEL)
4	13 August	Holbæk to Kalundborg	188.4 km (117.1 mi)	Flat stage	Colin Joyce (USA)
5	14 August	Frederiksberg	10.8 km (6.7 mi)	Individual time trial	Remco Evenepoel (BEL)
Total			783.3 km (486.7 mi)		

== Stages ==
=== Stage 1 ===
10 August 2021 – Struer to Esbjerg, 175.3 km (108.9 mi)

Stage 1 Result
Rank	Rider	Team	Time
1	Dylan Groenewegen (NED)	Team Jumbo–Visma	3h 47' 36"
2	Mark Cavendish (GBR)	Deceuninck–Quick-Step	+ 0"
3	Giacomo Nizzolo (ITA)	Team Qhubeka NextHash	+ 0"
4	Arvid de Kleijn (NED)	Rally Cycling	+ 2"
5	Cees Bol (NED)	Team DSM	+ 2"
6	Mike Teunissen (NED)	Team Jumbo–Visma	+ 2"
7	Mads Pedersen (DEN)	Trek–Segafredo	+ 2"
8	Tosh Van der Sande (BEL)	Lotto–Soudal	+ 2"
9	Jannik Steimle (GER)	Deceuninck–Quick-Step	+ 2"
10	Yves Lampaert (BEL)	Deceuninck–Quick-Step	+ 2"

General classification after Stage 1
Rank	Rider	Team	Time
1	Dylan Groenewegen (NED)	Team Jumbo–Visma	3h 47' 26"
2	Mark Cavendish (GBR)	Deceuninck–Quick-Step	+ 4"
3	Giacomo Nizzolo (ITA)	Team Qhubeka NextHash	+ 6"
4	Arvid de Kleijn (NED)	Rally Cycling	+ 12"
5	Cees Bol (NED)	Team DSM	+ 12"
6	Mike Teunissen (NED)	Team Jumbo–Visma	+ 12"
7	Mads Pedersen (DEN)	Trek–Segafredo	+ 12"
8	Tosh Van der Sande (BEL)	Lotto–Soudal	+ 12"
9	Jannik Steimle (GER)	Deceuninck–Quick-Step	+ 12"
10	Yves Lampaert (BEL)	Deceuninck–Quick-Step	+ 12"

=== Stage 2 ===
11 August 2021 – Ribe to Sønderborg, 189.6 km (117.8 mi)

Stage 2 Result
Rank	Rider	Team	Time
1	Mads Pedersen (DEN)	Trek–Segafredo	4h 02' 02"
2	Giacomo Nizzolo (ITA)	Team Qhubeka NextHash	+ 0"
3	Dylan Groenewegen (NED)	Team Jumbo–Visma	+ 0"
4	Rasmus Tiller (NOR)	Uno-X Pro Cycling Team	+ 0"
5	Jannik Steimle (GER)	Deceuninck–Quick-Step	+ 0"
6	Timothy Dupont (BEL)	Bingoal Pauwels Sauces WB	+ 0"
7	Arvid de Kleijn (NED)	Rally Cycling	+ 0"
8	Gerben Thijssen (BEL)	Lotto–Soudal	+ 0"
9	Tosh Van der Sande (BEL)	Lotto–Soudal	+ 0"
10	Mattias Skjelmose Jensen (DEN)	Trek–Segafredo	+ 0"

General classification after Stage 2
Rank	Rider	Team	Time
1	Dylan Groenewegen (NED)	Team Jumbo–Visma	7h 49' 24"
2	Giacomo Nizzolo (ITA)	Team Qhubeka NextHash	+ 4"
3	Mads Pedersen (DEN)	Trek–Segafredo	+ 6"
4	Mark Cavendish (GBR)	Deceuninck–Quick-Step	+ 8"
5	Kenneth Van Rooy (BEL)	Sport Vlaanderen–Baloise	+ 13"
6	Arvid de Kleijn (NED)	Rally Cycling	+ 16"
7	Jannik Steimle (GER)	Deceuninck–Quick-Step	+ 16"
8	Tosh Van der Sande (BEL)	Lotto–Soudal	+ 16"
9	Gerben Thijssen (BEL)	Lotto–Soudal	+ 16"
10	Rasmus Tiller (NOR)	Uno-X Pro Cycling Team	+ 16"

=== Stage 3 ===
12 August 2021 – Tønder to Vejle, 219.2 km (136.2 mi)

Stage 3 Result
Rank	Rider	Team	Time
1	Remco Evenepoel (BEL)	Deceuninck–Quick-Step	4h 54' 44"
2	Tosh Van der Sande (BEL)	Lotto–Soudal	+ 1' 29"
3	Nick van der Lijke (NED)	Riwal Cycling Team	+ 1' 32"
4	Mike Teunissen (NED)	Team Jumbo–Visma	+ 1' 32"
5	Mads Pedersen (DEN)	Trek–Segafredo	+ 1' 41"
6	Anthon Charmig (DEN)	Uno-X Pro Cycling Team	+ 1' 54"
7	Mattias Skjelmose Jensen (DEN)	Trek–Segafredo	+ 3' 21"
8	Milan Menten (BEL)	Bingoal Pauwels Sauces WB	+ 3' 21"
9	Mads Rahbek (DEN)	BHS–PL Beton Bornholm	+ 3' 23"
10	Jeppe Pallesen (DEN)	Team ColoQuick	+ 3' 23"

General classification after Stage 3
Rank	Rider	Team	Time
1	Remco Evenepoel (BEL)	Deceuninck–Quick-Step	12h 44' 14"
2	Tosh Van der Sande (BEL)	Lotto–Soudal	+ 1' 33"
3	Mads Pedersen (DEN)	Trek–Segafredo	+ 1' 36"
4	Nick van der Lijke (NED)	Riwal Cycling Team	+ 1' 38"
5	Mike Teunissen (NED)	Team Jumbo–Visma	+ 1' 40"
6	Anthon Charmig (DEN)	Uno-X Pro Cycling Team	+ 2' 04"
7	Milan Menten (BEL)	Bingoal Pauwels Sauces WB	+ 3' 31"
8	Mattias Skjelmose Jensen (DEN)	Trek–Segafredo	+ 3' 31"
9	Rasmus Tiller (NOR)	Uno-X Pro Cycling Team	+ 3' 33"
10	Lucas Eriksson (SWE)	Riwal Cycling Team	+ 3' 33"

=== Stage 4 ===
13 August 2021 – Holbæk to Kalundborg, 188.4 km (117.1 mi)

Stage 4 Result
Rank	Rider	Team	Time
1	Colin Joyce (USA)	Rally Cycling	4h 22' 44"
2	Sebastian Nielsen (DEN)	Restaurant Suri–Carl Ras	+ 0"
3	Martin Salmon (GER)	Team DSM	+ 0"
4	Magnus Bak Klaris (DEN)	Team PostNord Danmark	+ 0"
5	Aaron Van Poucke (BEL)	Sport Vlaanderen–Baloise	+ 0"
6	Mads Kristensen (DEN)	Team ColoQuick	+ 2"
7	Giacomo Nizzolo (ITA)	Team Qhubeka NextHash	+ 6"
8	Mads Pedersen (DEN)	Trek–Segafredo	+ 6"
9	Mark Cavendish (GBR)	Deceuninck–Quick-Step	+ 6"
10	Michael Mørkøv (DEN)	Deceuninck–Quick-Step	+ 6"

General classification after Stage 4
Rank	Rider	Team	Time
1	Remco Evenepoel (BEL)	Deceuninck–Quick-Step	17h 07' 04"
2	Tosh Van der Sande (BEL)	Lotto–Soudal	+ 1' 33"
3	Mads Pedersen (DEN)	Trek–Segafredo	+ 1' 36"
4	Nick van der Lijke (NED)	Riwal Cycling Team	+ 1' 38"
5	Mike Teunissen (NED)	Team Jumbo–Visma	+ 1' 40"
6	Anthon Charmig (DEN)	Uno-X Pro Cycling Team	+ 2' 16"
7	Milan Menten (BEL)	Bingoal Pauwels Sauces WB	+ 3' 31"
8	Rasmus Tiller (NOR)	Uno-X Pro Cycling Team	+ 3' 33"
9	Lucas Eriksson (SWE)	Riwal Cycling Team	+ 3' 33"
10	Mattias Skjelmose Jensen (DEN)	Trek–Segafredo	+ 3' 43"

=== Stage 5 ===
14 August 2021 – Frederiksberg, 10.8 km (6.7 mi) (ITT)

Stage 5 Result
Rank	Rider	Team	Time
1	Remco Evenepoel (BEL)	Deceuninck–Quick-Step	12' 13"
2	Søren Kragh Andersen (DEN)	Team DSM	+ 1"
3	Mads Pedersen (DEN)	Trek–Segafredo	+ 5"
4	Edoardo Affini (ITA)	Team Jumbo–Visma	+ 6"
5	Jannik Steimle (GER)	Deceuninck–Quick-Step	+ 13"
6	Mike Teunissen (NED)	Team Jumbo–Visma	+ 20"
7	Mattias Skjelmose Jensen (DEN)	Trek–Segafredo	+ 22"
8	Morten Hulgaard (DEN)	Uno-X Pro Cycling Team	+ 27"
9	Mark Cavendish (GBR)	Deceuninck–Quick-Step	+ 30"
10	Adam Holm Jørgensen (DEN)	BHS–PL Beton Bornholm	+ 32"

General classification after Stage 5
Rank	Rider	Team	Time
1	Remco Evenepoel (BEL)	Deceuninck–Quick-Step	17h 19' 17"
2	Mads Pedersen (DEN)	Trek–Segafredo	+ 1' 42"
3	Mike Teunissen (NED)	Team Jumbo–Visma	+ 2' 00"
4	Nick van der Lijke (NED)	Riwal Cycling Team	+ 2' 14"
5	Tosh Van der Sande (BEL)	Lotto–Soudal	+ 2' 30"
6	Søren Kragh Andersen (DEN)	Team DSM	+ 3' 46"
7	Anthon Charmig (DEN)	Uno-X Pro Cycling Team	+ 3' 51"
8	Mattias Skjelmose Jensen (DEN)	Trek–Segafredo	+ 4' 06"
9	Julien Bernard (FRA)	Trek–Segafredo	+ 4' 42"
10	Lucas Eriksson (SWE)	Riwal Cycling Team	+ 4' 42"

== Classification leadership table ==
Classification leadership by stage
Stage	Winner	General classification	Points classification	Mountains classification	Young rider classification	Active rider classification	Team classification
1	Dylan Groenewegen	Dylan Groenewegen	Dylan Groenewegen	Frederik Jensen	Morten Nørtoft	Rasmus Bøgh Wallin	Deceuninck–Quick-Step
2	Mads Pedersen	Dylan Groenewegen	Dylan Groenewegen	Rasmus Bøgh Wallin	Mattias Skjelmose Jensen	Rasmus Bøgh Wallin	Trek–Segafredo
3	Remco Evenepoel	Remco Evenepoel	Mads Pedersen	Rasmus Bøgh Wallin	Remco Evenepoel	Rasmus Bøgh Wallin	Trek–Segafredo
4	Colin Joyce	Remco Evenepoel	Mads Pedersen	Rasmus Bøgh Wallin	Remco Evenepoel	Rasmus Bøgh Wallin	Trek–Segafredo
5	Remco Evenepoel	Remco Evenepoel	Mads Pedersen	Rasmus Bøgh Wallin	Remco Evenepoel	Rasmus Bøgh Wallin	Trek–Segafredo
Final		Remco Evenepoel	Mads Pedersen	Rasmus Bøgh Wallin	Remco Evenepoel	Rasmus Bøgh Wallin	Trek–Segafredo

- On stage 2, Mark Cavendish, who was second in the points classification, wore the green jersey, because first-placed Dylan Groenewegen wore the cyan jersey as the leader of the general classification. For the same reason, Giacomo Nizzolo wore the green jersey on stage 3.
- On stage 3, Jakub Kaczmarek, who was second in the active rider classification, wore the dark blue jersey, because first-placed Rasmus Bøgh Wallin wore the blue polka dot jersey as the leader of the mountains classification. For the same reason, Daniel Stampe wore the dark blue jersey on stage 4, and Emil Toudal on stage 5.
- On stages 4 and 5, Mattias Skjelmose Jensen, who was second in the young rider classification, wore the white jersey, because first-placed Remco Evenepoel wore the cyan jersey as the leader of the general classification.

== Final classification standings ==
Legend
Denotes the winner of the general classification	Denotes the winner of the young rider classification
Denotes the winner of the points classification	Denotes the winner of the active rider classification
Denotes the winner of the mountains classification	

=== General classification ===
Final general classification (1–10)
Rank	Rider	Team	Time
1	Remco Evenepoel (BEL)	Deceuninck–Quick-Step	17h 19' 17"
2	Mads Pedersen (DEN)	Trek–Segafredo	+ 1' 42"
3	Mike Teunissen (NED)	Team Jumbo–Visma	+ 2' 00"
4	Nick van der Lijke (NED)	Riwal Cycling Team	+ 2' 14"
5	Tosh Van der Sande (BEL)	Lotto–Soudal	+ 2' 30"
6	Søren Kragh Andersen (DEN)	Team DSM	+ 3' 46"
7	Anthon Charmig (DEN)	Uno-X Pro Cycling Team	+ 3' 51"
8	Mattias Skjelmose Jensen (DEN)	Trek–Segafredo	+ 4' 06"
9	Julien Bernard (FRA)	Trek–Segafredo	+ 4' 42"
10	Lucas Eriksson (SWE)	Riwal Cycling Team	+ 4' 42"

=== Points classification ===
Final points classification (1–10)
Rank	Rider	Team	Points
1	Mads Pedersen (DEN)	Trek–Segafredo	52
2	Remco Evenepoel (BEL)	Deceuninck–Quick-Step	30
3	Giacomo Nizzolo (ITA)	Team Qhubeka NextHash	29
4	Mike Teunissen (NED)	Team Jumbo–Visma	26
5	Dylan Groenewegen (NED)	Team Jumbo–Visma	25
6	Tosh Van der Sande (BEL)	Lotto–Soudal	21
7	Jannik Steimle (GER)	Deceuninck–Quick-Step	20
8	Mark Cavendish (GBR)	Deceuninck–Quick-Step	20
9	Colin Joyce (USA)	Rally Cycling	18
10	Sebastian Nielsen (DEN)	Restaurant Suri–Carl Ras	18

=== Mountains classification ===
Final mountains classification (1–10)
Rank	Rider	Team	Points
1	Rasmus Bøgh Wallin (DEN)	Team PostNord Danmark	40
2	Emil Toudal (DEN)	BHS–PL Beton Bornholm	40
3	Frederik Jensen (DEN)	BHS–PL Beton Bornholm	32
4	Jannik Steimle (GER)	Deceuninck–Quick-Step	16
5	Julien Bernard (FRA)	Trek–Segafredo	12
6	Jesper Hansen (DEN)	Riwal Cycling Team	12
7	Daniel Stampe (DEN)	Team PostNord Danmark	12
8	Norbert Banaszek (POL)	HRE Mazowsze Serce Polski	12
9	Anders Foldager (DEN)	Team PostNord Danmark	12
10	Jakub Kaczmarek (POL)	HRE Mazowsze Serce Polski	12

=== Young rider classification ===
Final young rider classification (1–10)
Rank	Rider	Team	Time
1	Remco Evenepoel (BEL)	Deceuninck–Quick-Step	17h 19' 17"
2	Mattias Skjelmose Jensen (DEN)	Trek–Segafredo	+ 4' 06"
3	Rick Pluimers (NED)	Team Jumbo–Visma	+ 10' 46"
4	Antonio Puppio (ITA)	Team Qhubeka NextHash	+ 14' 37"
5	Kasper Andersen (DEN)	Team ColoQuick	+ 15' 14"
6	Sébastien Grignard (BEL)	Lotto–Soudal	+ 16' 07"
7	Tim van Dijke (NED)	Team Jumbo–Visma	+ 17' 03"
8	Sebastian Nielsen (DEN)	Restaurant Suri–Carl Ras	+ 19' 53"
9	Frederik Jensen (DEN)	BHS–PL Beton Bornholm	+ 21' 44"
10	Fabio Mazzucco (ITA)	Bardiani–CSF–Faizanè	+ 22' 15"

=== Active rider classification ===
Final active rider classification (1–10)
Rank	Rider	Team	Points
1	Rasmus Bøgh Wallin (DEN)	Team PostNord Danmark	24
2	Emil Toudal (DEN)	BHS–PL Beton Bornholm	20
3	Daniel Stampe (DEN)	Team PostNord Danmark	12
4	Jakub Kaczmarek (POL)	HRE Mazowsze Serce Polski	8
5	Nickolas Zukowsky (CAN)	Rally Cycling	8
6	Ruben Apers (BEL)	Sport Vlaanderen–Baloise	8
7	Norbert Banaszek (POL)	HRE Mazowsze Serce Polski	4
8	Rasmus Quaade (DEN)	Riwal Cycling Team	4
9	Mirco Maestri (ITA)	Bardiani–CSF–Faizanè	4
10	Martin Salmon (GER)	Team DSM	4

=== Team classification ===
Final team classification (1–10)
Rank	Team	Time
1	Trek–Segafredo	52h 08' 18"
2	Deceuninck–Quick-Step	+ 4' 59"
3	Team Jumbo–Visma	+ 10' 27"
4	Riwal Cycling Team	+ 10' 37"
5	Uno-X Pro Cycling Team	+ 12' 39"
6	Team ColoQuick	+ 22' 28"
7	Rally Cycling	+ 22' 31"
8	Lotto–Soudal	+ 23' 00"
9	Team PostNord Danmark	+ 24' 13"
10	Team Qhubeka NextHash	+ 24' 58"
