= Sara Penton =

Swedish cyclist

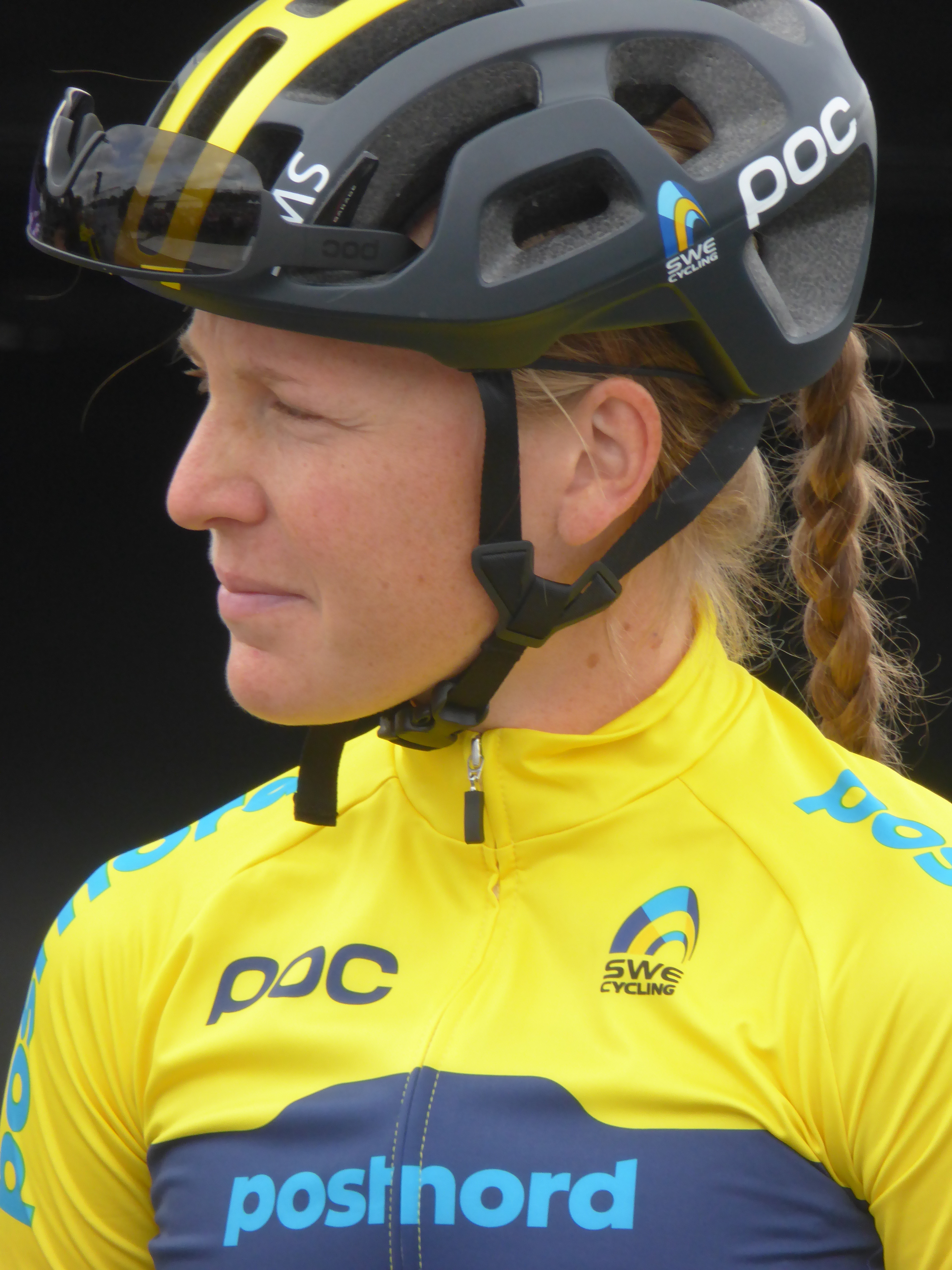
- Penton at the 2018 European Road Cycling Championships.

Personal information
- Full name: Sara Marie Penton
- Born: 15 November 1988 (age 37)

Cycling career
- Sport: Cycling
- Current team: Retired
- Discipline: Road
- Role: Rider

Amateur team
- 2015: De Jonge Renner

Professional teams
- 2016: Lares–Waowdeals
- 2017–2019: Team VéloCONCEPT
- 2020–2021: Drops

Sara Marie Penton (born 15 November 1988) is a Swedish former professional racing cyclist, who rode professionally between 2016 and 2021 for the Lares–Waowdeals, Team Virtu Cycling and Drops–Le Col teams.

== Career ==
A former football player who retired from that sport at around 18 years old in 2006 due to medical issues with her knees, Penton started her first cycling race in 2013. She had begun to take cycling seriously for the first time in 2011 whilst working in a bike shop, completing the 300-kilometre (190-mile) Vätternrundan sportive the same year. In 2017, Penton won the Swedish National Road Race Championships, becoming the first rider other than Emma Johansson and Emilia Fahlin – neither of whom raced the 2017 edition – to win the race in seven years. Penton retired from competition at the end of the 2021 season.

== Major results ==
2015
9th Trofee Maarten Wynants
9th Erondegemse Pijl
2017
1st Road race, National Road Championships
2018
3rd Road race, National Road Championships

== See also ==
- List of 2016 UCI Women's Teams and riders
