= Madeleine Lindberg =

Swedish cyclist

Personal information
- Born: 1 March 1972 (age 54) Sweden

Cycling career
- Sport: Cycling
- Discipline: Road cycling

Professional teams
- 1997: Crescent
- 2000–2002: Farm Frites–Hartol
- 2003–2005: Equipe Nürnberger Versicherung
Medal record
Women's road cycling
Representing Sweden
World Championships
Bronze medal – third place	2000 Plouay	Road race

Madeleine Lindberg (born 1 March 1972) is a road cyclist from Sweden. She represented her nation at the 1992 Summer Olympics and 2004 Summer Olympics. She also rode between 1993 and 2005 at the UCI Road World Championships. At the 2000 UCI Road World Championships she won the bronze medal in the women's road race. She won several times the Swedish National Road Race Championships and Swedish National Time Trial Championships.
