= Per Christiansson =

Swedish cyclist (1961–2023)

Personal information
- Born: 21 June 1961 Ystad, Sweden
- Died: 18 January 2023 (aged 61)

Cycling career
- Sport: Cycling
- Discipline: Road
- Role: Rider

Professional team
- 1986–1987: Atala–Ofmega

Per Mikael Christiansson (21 June 1961 – 18 January 2023) was a Swedish competitive cyclist. He competed in the individual road race and the team time trial events at the 1984 Summer Olympics. He also rode in the 1986 Giro d'Italia, but did not finish.

Christiansson died from cancer on 18 January 2023, at the age of 61.

== Major results ==
1979
1st Time trial, National Junior Road Championships
1980
1st Scandinavian Race in Uppsala
1981
1st Scandinavian Race in Uppsala
1982
2nd Road race, National Road Championships
1983
2nd Overall Tour of Norway
3rd Overall Tour of Sweden
1985
1st Road race, National Road Championships
1986
1st Stage 4 Tour of Sweden
5th Coppa Sabatini
9th Giro dell'Emilia
