= Nick van der Lijke =

Dutch cyclist

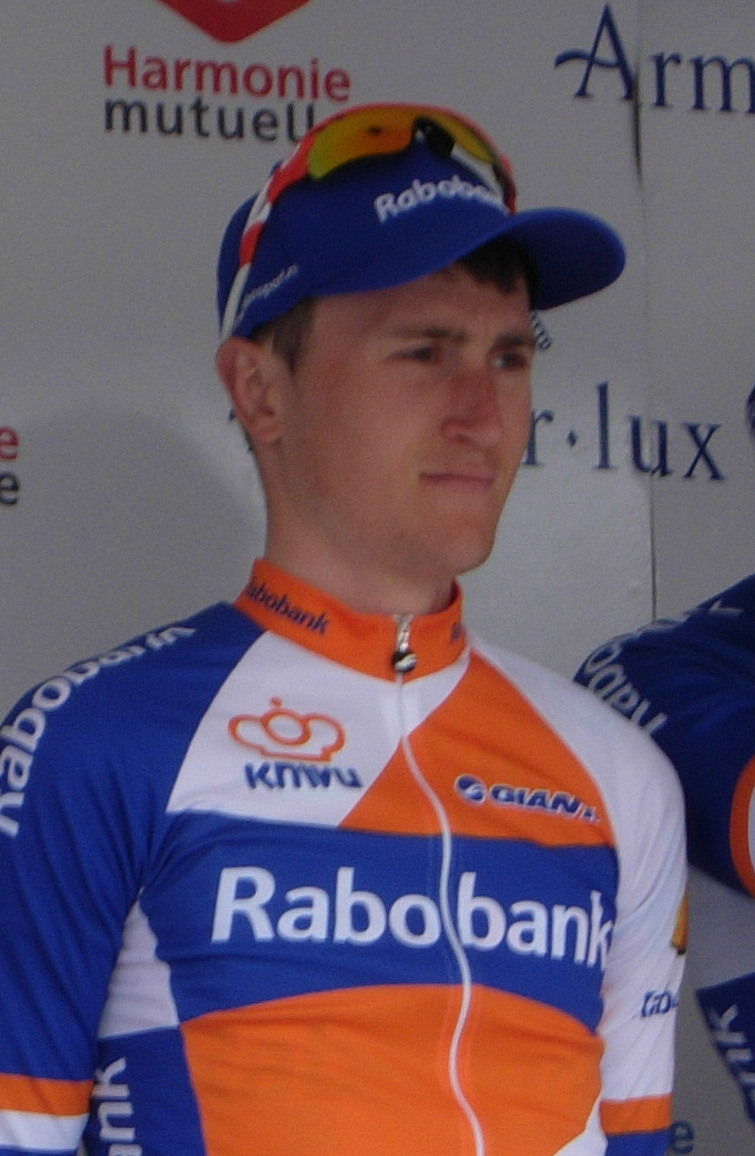
- Van der Lijke at the 2013 Tour de Bretagne

Personal information
- Full name: Nick van der Lijke
- Born: 23 September 1991 (age 35) Middelburg, Netherlands
- Height: 1.76 m (5 ft 9 in)
- Weight: 61 kg (134 lb)

Cycling career
- Sport: Cycling
- Current team: Leopard TOGT Pro Cycling
- Discipline: Road
- Role: Rider

Amateur team
- 2022: ZRTC Theo Middelkamp

Professional teams
- 2010–2013: Rabobank Continental Team
- 2014–2015: Belkin Pro Cycling
- 2016–2019: Roompot–Oranje Peloton
- 2020–2021: Riwal Readynez
- 2023–: Leopard TOGT Pro Cycling

Nick van der Lijke (born 23 September 1991) is a Dutch racing cyclist, who currently rides for UCI Continental team Leopard TOGT Pro Cycling.

Nick van der Lijke is married to Dutch former professional cyclist Nicky Zijlaard. When he did not get a new contract for 2022, the couple took over the Zijlaard family business. A few months later they handed the Croissanterie back to Nicky's parents, and Nick got back to racing. His amateur successes lead to a new contract with Riwal Cycling Team who in 2023 merged with Leopard Pro Cycling.

== Major results ==
2010
10th Rund um den Finanzplatz Eschborn-Frankfurt U23
2011
7th Grand Prix des Marbriers
9th Overall Tour of Norway
10th Ronde van Midden-Nederland
2012
1st Overall Tour de Gironde

1st Young rider classification
1st Stage 1

1st Mountains classification Boucles de la Mayenne
4th Omloop der Kempen
6th Overall Tour de Bretagne
8th Overall Tour of China I
9th Overall Ronde de l'Oise
2013
1st Overall Kreiz Breizh Elites

1st Points classification
1st Young rider classification
1st Stage 2 (ITT)

1st Beverbeek Classic
2nd Overall Tour de Bretagne

1st Young rider classification

3rd Overall Tour de Gironde

1st Young rider classification

3rd Grand Prix de la Somme
6th Overall Le Triptyque des Monts et Châteaux
6th Overall Olympia's Tour
6th Ronde van Vlaanderen U23
7th Paris–Tours Espoirs
8th Dorpenomloop Rucphen
9th Ronde van Overijssel
10th Ronde van Zeeland Seaports
2014
9th Overall Tour of Hainan
2015
7th Dwars door Drenthe
10th Ronde van Drenthe
2016
3rd Overall Tour des Fjords

1st Young rider classification

2017
3rd Volta Limburg Classic
9th Overall Tour des Fjords
2018
1st Derny, UEC European Track Championships
9th Overall Okolo Slovenska
10th Overall Deutschland Tour
2019
3rd Veenendaal–Veenendaal Classic
10th Overall Tour de Yorkshire
10th Druivenkoers Overijse
2020
8th Druivenkoers Overijse
2021
1st Overall Kreiz Breizh Elites
4th Overall Danmark Rundt
4th Skive–Løbet
5th Overall Tour de Bretagne

1st Points classification

8th GP Herning
2022
1st Omloop van de Braakman
