= Nicolai Brøchner =

Danish cyclist (born 1993)

Personal information
- Full name: Nicolai Philip Brøchner Nielsen
- Born: 4 July 1993 (age 33) Vejle, Denmark

Cycling career
- Sport: Cycling
- Current team: Retired
- Discipline: Road
- Role: Rider

Amateur teams
- 2010: Knudsgaard
- 2011: Designa Køkken–Knudsgaard junior
- 2013: Bissell–ABG–Giant

Professional teams
- 2012: Team Designa Køkken–Knudsgaard
- 2013: Bissell
- 2014: Bissell Development Team
- 2015–2017: Riwal Platform
- 2018: Holowesko Citadel p/b Arapahoe Resources
- 2019: Riwal Readynez
- 2020–2022: Team ColoQuick

Nicolai Philip Brøchner Nielsen (born 4 July 1993) is a Danish former racing cyclist, who competed as a professional from 2012 to 2022.

== Major results ==
2014
1st Stage 2 Tour of the Gila
3rd Road race, National Under-23 Road Championships
2015
1st Scandinavian Race Uppsala
1st Stage 2 (TTT) ZLM Tour
3rd Zuid Oost Drenthe Classic I
4th Himmerland Rundt
5th Dorpenomloop Rucphen
5th Ronde van Noord-Holland
5th Velothon Stockholm
2016
An Post Rás

1st Stages 4 & 8

3rd Ster van Zwolle
3rd Arno Wallaard Memorial
3rd Scandinavian Race Uppsala
5th Fyen Rundt
6th GP Horsens
10th Himmerland Rundt
10th Memoriał Henryka Łasaka
2017
1st Himmerland Rundt
1st Ronde van Overijssel
1st Scandinavian Race Uppsala
1st Mountains classification Danmark Rundt
1st Stage 1 An Post Rás
2nd Road race, National Road Championships
4th Overall Okolo Jižních Čech
4th Skive–Løbet
6th Overall Tour de Normandie
6th GP Horsens
10th Flèche Ardennaise
2018
1st Mountains classification Danmark Rundt
4th Road race, National Road Championships
2019
1st Stage 1 Tour de Normandie
2nd Himmerland Rundt
4th Scandinavian Race Uppsala
4th Kalmar Grand Prix
2021
4th GP Herning
