= Marcus Ljungqvist =

Swedish cyclist

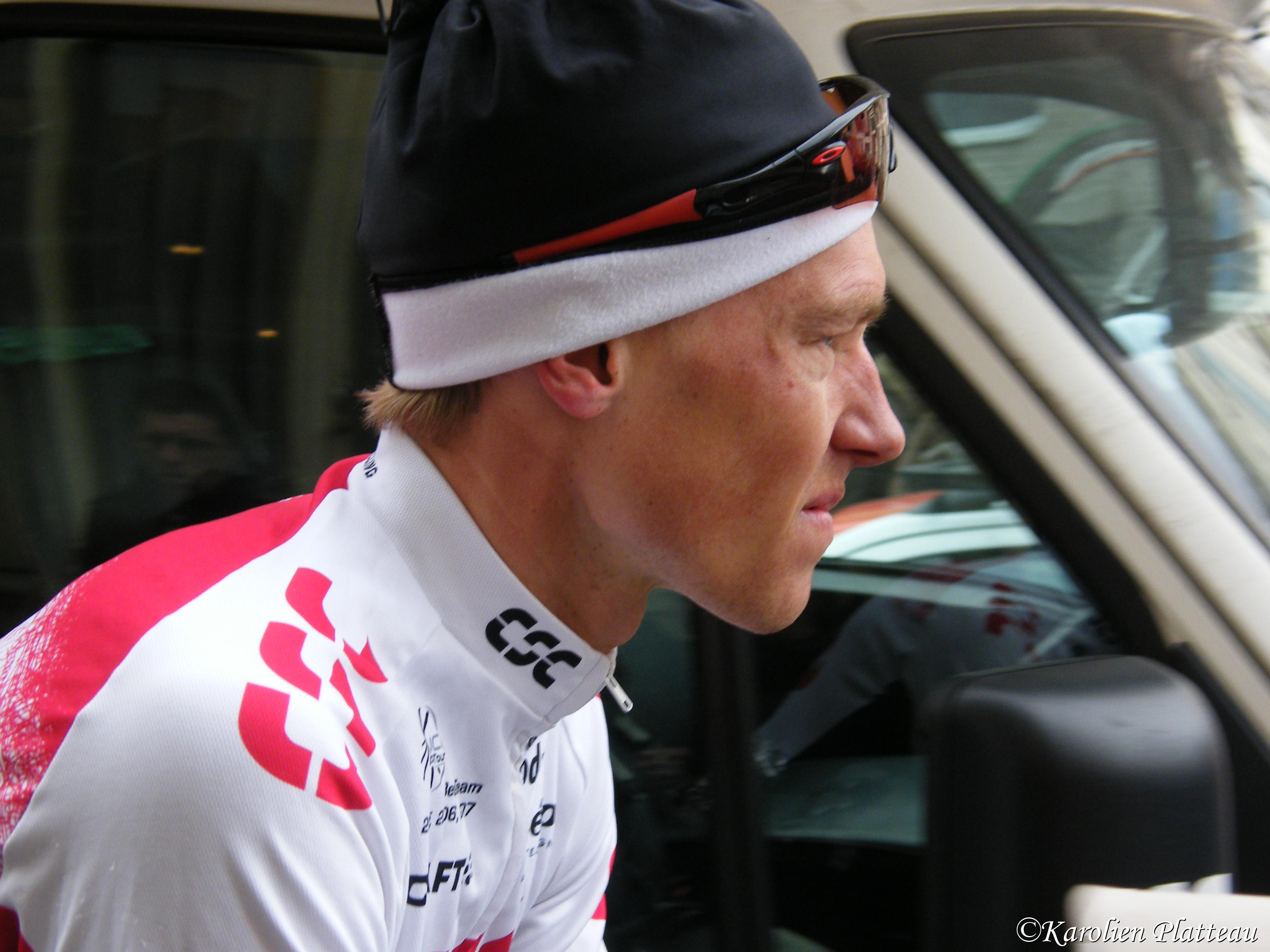
- Ljungqvist at the 2008 E3 Harelbeke

Personal information
- Full name: Marcus Ljungqvist
- Born: October 26, 1974 (age 51) Falun, Sweden
- Height: 1.89 m (6 ft 2 in)
- Weight: 73 kg (161 lb)

Cycling career
- Sport: Cycling
- Discipline: Road
- Role: Rider; Sporting director

Amateur teams
- 1994: Team Isostar
- 1995–1997: Team Wirsbo

Professional teams
- 1998–1999: Cantina Tollo–Alexia Alluminio
- 2000–2002: Team Fakta`
- 2003: Crédit Agricole
- 2004: Alessio–Bianchi
- 2005: Liquigas–Bianchi
- 2006–2009: Team CSC

Managerial team
- 2010–2013: Team Sky

Marcus Ljungqvist (born October 26, 1974, in Falun) is a Swedish former professional road bicycle racer. He turned professional in 1998, and retired from racing after the 2009 season. He worked for Team Sky as a sporting director from 2010 until 2013. He finished 4th in the road race at the 2005 UCI Road World Championships, which is the best placement ever for a Swedish rider.

== Career achievements ==
=== Major results ===
1996
1st Road race, National Road Championships
1998
1st Stage 2 Tour of Japan
3rd Overall Tour of Sweden
1999
1st Stage 11 Tour de Langkawi
2000
7th Hel van het Mergelland
10th Overall Tour of Sweden
2001
1st Road race, National Road Championships
1st Stage 3 Rheinland-Pfalz Rundfahrt
1st Stage 3 Tour of Rhodes
2nd Boucles de l'Aulne
3rd Overall Tour de Normandie

1st Stage 5

4th GP Aarhus
10th Overall Danmark Rundt
2002
1st Overall Tour de Luxembourg

1st Stage 2

1st Paris–Camembert
1st Route Adélie
6th Overall Tour of Rhodes
6th Overall Étoile de Bessèges
7th GP de Fourmies
7th Overall Tour of Sweden
8th Grand Prix Pino Cerami
8th Rund um den Henninger Turm
2004
1st Scandinavian Open Road Race
2nd Road race, National Road Championships
5th E3 Harelbeke
2005
4th Road race, UCI Road World Championships
2006
1st Stage 2 Paris–Corrèze
3rd Time trial, National Road Championships
5th Grand Prix Herning
5th Brabantse Pijl
6th E3 Harelbeke
2007
2nd Overall Tour of Ireland
2nd Monte Paschi Eroica
2009
1st Road race, National Road Championships

=== Grand Tour general classification results timeline ===
Grand Tour	1999	2000	2001	2002	2003	2004	2005	2006	2007
Giro d'Italia	—	—	—	—	—	63	—	—	—
Tour de France	131	—	—	—	—	132	125	—	—
Vuelta a España	—	—	—	—	—	—	114	53	43

Legend
DSQ	Disqualified
DNF	Did not finish
