= Tjejtrampet =

Race details
- Date: late May-early June
- Region: Sweden
- Discipline: road bicycle racing
- Type: one-day

History
- First edition: 1990
- First winner: Marianne Berglund, Sweden
- Most wins: Leoniten-Zilijaard van Moorsel, Netherlands (5)
- Most recent: Majken Lidén, Sweden

Tjejtrampet was an annual road bicycle racing event which, as the name tells (“tjej” being Swedish for “girl”), was only for female participants. The events were held in Sweden by late May between 1990-2009. The race was held for first time on 13 May 1990 and was won by Marianne Berglund.

In 2006, the competitions were moved from Stockholm to Västerås.

== Winners ==
- 1990: Marianne Berglund, Sweden
- 1991: Tea Vikstedt-Nyman, Finland
- 1992: Monique Knol, Netherlands
- 1993: Monique Knol, Netherlands
- 1994: Monique Knol, Netherlands
- 1995: Debby Mansveldl, Netherlands
- 1996: Monique Knol, Netherlands
- 1997: Jorunn Kvalø, Norway
- 1998: Susanne Ljungskog, Sweden
- 1999: Leoniten-Zilijaard van Moorsel, Netherlands
- 2000: Leoniten-Zilijaard van Moorsel, Netherlands
- 2001: Leoniten-Zilijaard van Moorsel, Netherlands
- 2002: Leoniten-Zilijaard van Moorsel, Netherlands
- 2003: Leoniten-Zilijaard van Moorsel, Netherlands
- 2004: Tina Nieminen, Finland
- 2005: Suzanne de Goede, Netherlands
- 2006: Hanna Isacsson, Sweden
- 2007: Monica Holler, CK Hymer, Sweden
- 2008: Kajsa Snihs, Alrikssons Cycle Team CK, Sweden
- 2009: Majken Lidén, Sweden
- 2010: cancelled

== See also ==
- Tjejmilen
- Tjejvasan
