= Lars Andersson (cyclist) =

Swedish cyclist

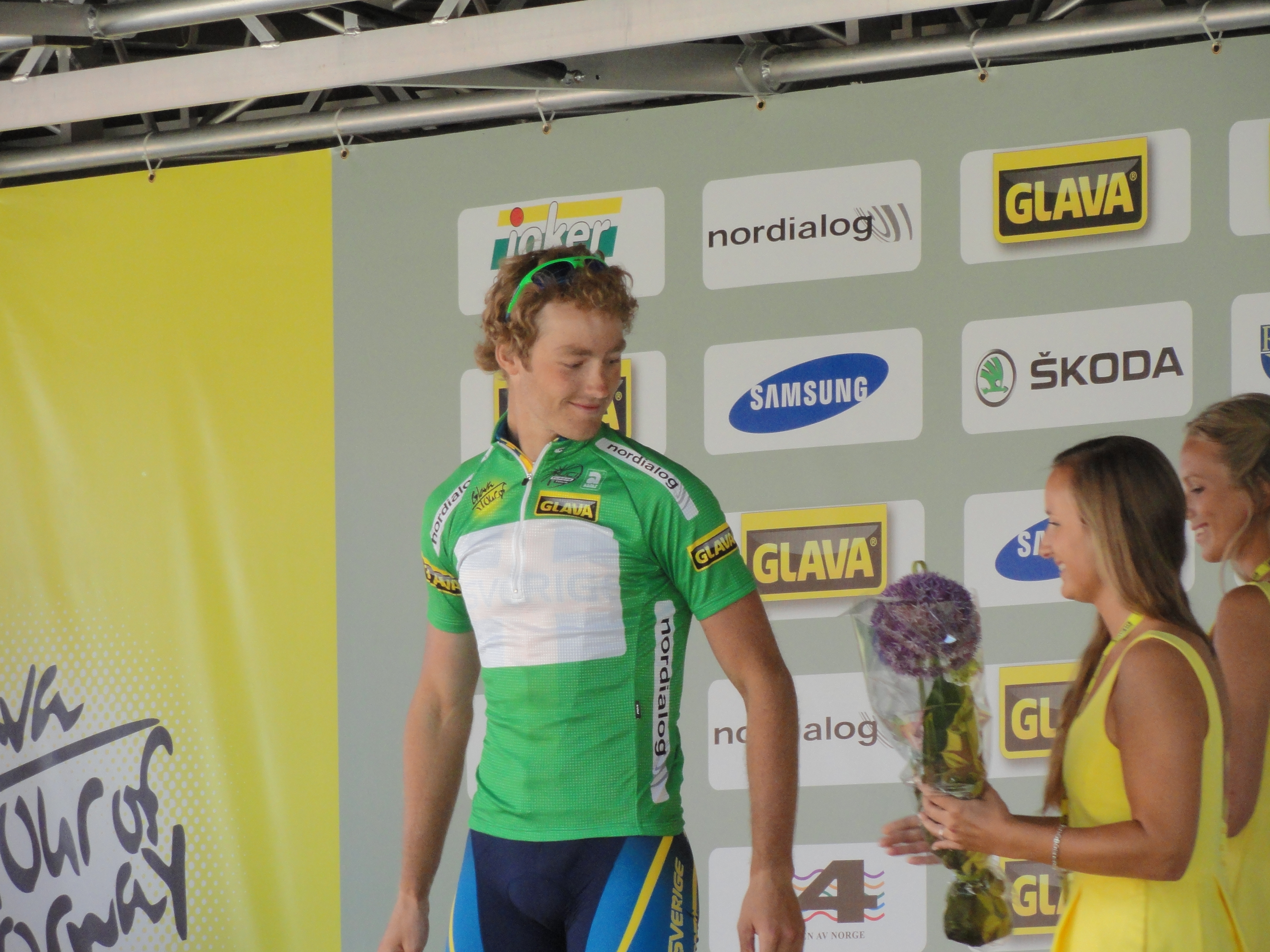

Personal information
- Born: 18 February 1988 (age 38) Gothenburg, Sweden

Cycling career
- Sport: Cycling
- Discipline: Road
- Role: Rider

Amateur teams
- 2010: Team Örebro Örebrocyklisterna
- 2011: Nordic Eco-Vallentuna

Professional teams
- 2008–2009: Team Trek-Adecco
- 2012–2013: Team Concordia Forsikring-Himmerland
- 2014: Firefighters Upsala CK

Lars Andersson (born 18 February 1988) is a Swedish cyclist.

== Palmares ==
2011
4th Tartu GP
6th Scandinavian Race Uppsala
2012
1st Stage 1 Tour d'Algérie
2nd National Road Race Championships
6th Scandinavian Race Uppsala
2013
6th Scandinavian Race Uppsala
2014
6th Scandinavian Race Uppsala
