= Elmar Reinders =

Dutch cyclist (born 1992)

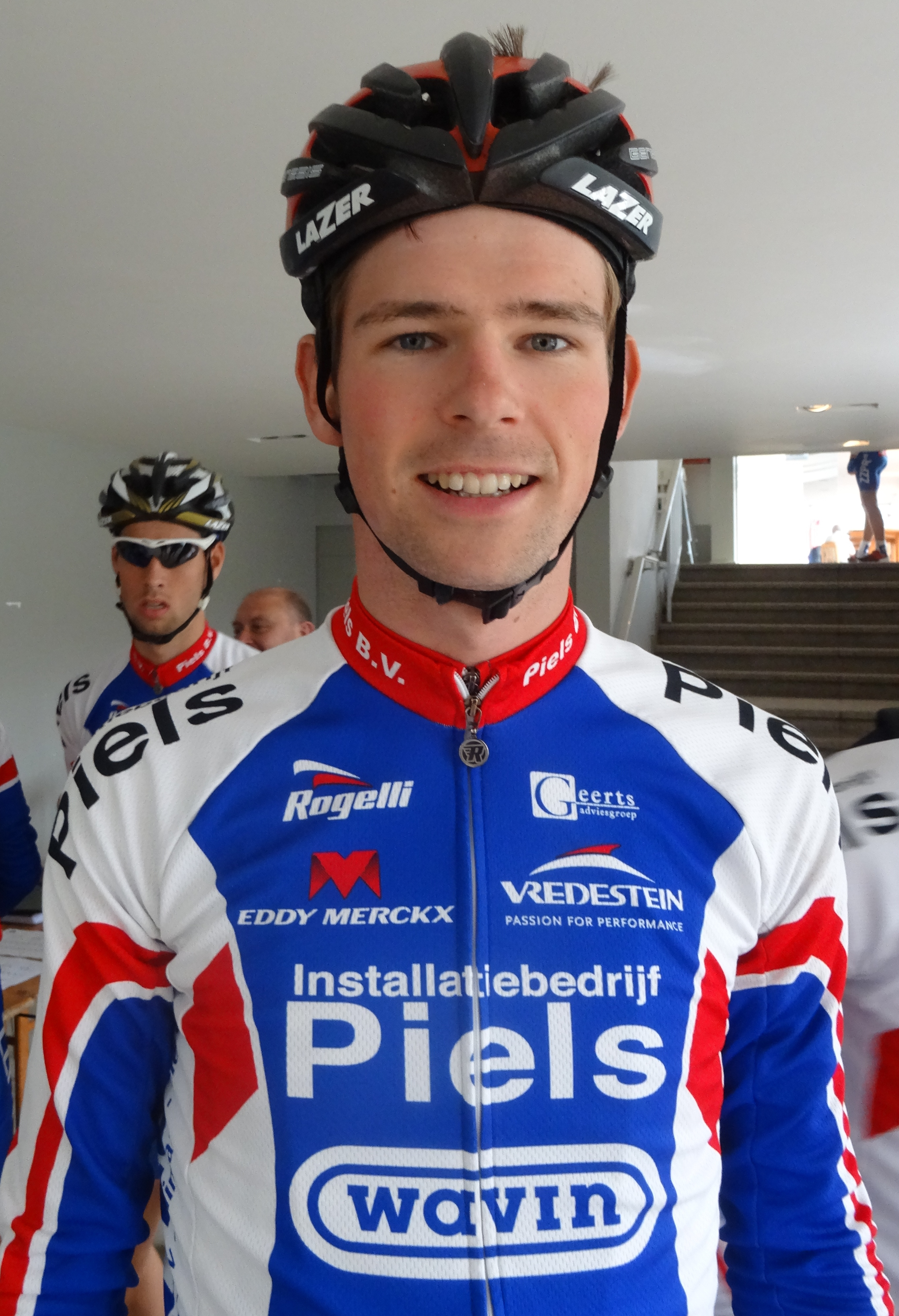
- Reinders in 2014.

Personal information
- Full name: Elmar Reinders
- Born: 14 March 1992 (age 34) Emmen, Netherlands
- Height: 1.91 m (6 ft 3 in)
- Weight: 78 kg (172 lb)

Cycling career
- Sport: Cycling
- Current team: Unibet Rose Rockets
- Discipline: Road
- Role: Rider
- Rider type: Sprinter

Amateur teams
- 2008: WSV Emmen
- 2009: UWTC de Volharding
- 2010: Wilton

Professional teams
- 2011–2013: Metec
- 2014–2016: Cycling Team Jo Piels
- 2017–2019: Roompot–Nederlandse Loterij
- 2020–2022: Riwal Readynez
- 2022–2025: Team BikeExchange–Jayco
- 2026–: Unibet Rose Rockets

Elmar Reinders (born 14 March 1992 in Emmen) is a Dutch racing cyclist, who currently rides for UCI ProTeam Unibet Rose Rockets.

In August 2025, Reinders was announced as a new addition to the UCI ProTeam Unibet Rose Rockets on a two-year deal starting in 2026.

== Major results ==
2012
8th Ronde van Noord-Holland
2013
3rd Ster van Zwolle
4th Overall Olympia's Tour
6th Ronde van Drenthe
2014
2nd Overall Tour de Berlin

1st Stage 1

5th Overall Olympia's Tour

1st Stage 2 (TTT)

2015
1st Ster van Zwolle
1st Stage 1a (TTT) Olympia's Tour
3rd Dorpenomloop Rucphen
4th Arno Wallaard Memorial
6th Parel van de Veluwe
7th Zuid Oost Drenthe Classic I
2016
1st ZODC Zuidenveld Tour
2nd Arno Wallaard Memorial
4th Ronde van Overijssel
8th Ronde van Drenthe
8th Fyen Rundt
9th Overall Tour du Loir-et-Cher
9th Dorpenomloop Rucphen
2017
5th Ronde van Drenthe
5th Dorpenomloop Rucphen
8th Dwars door West-Vlaanderen
10th Trofeo Serra de Tramuntana
2018
1st Combativity classification, BinckBank Tour
3rd Trofeo Lloseta–Andratx
2019
1st Mountains classification, Tour of Norway
8th Le Samyn
2020
7th Overall Tour Poitou-Charentes en Nouvelle-Aquitaine
2021
1st Skive–Løbet
1st PWZ Zuidenveld Tour
1st Stage 4 Tour de Bretagne
3rd Ster van Zwolle
4th Route Adélie
5th GP Herning
5th Himmerland Rundt
9th Fyen Rundt
2022
1st Arno Wallaard Memorial
1st Visit Friesland Elfsteden Race
Tour de Bretagne

1st Points classification
1st Stage 5

Olympia's Tour

1st Points classification
1st Stage 3

1st Stage 1 Circuit des Ardennes
2nd Fyen Rundt
4th Grand Prix Herning
5th Time trial, National Road Championships
9th Volta Limburg Classic
2024
5th Elfstedenrace
2026
4th Clàssica Comunitat Valenciana 1969

=== Grand Tour general classification results timeline ===
Grand Tour	2023	2024	2025
Giro d'Italia	—	—	—
Tour de France	141	DNF	
Vuelta a España	—	—	

Legend
—	Did not compete
DNF	Did not finish
IP	Race in Progress
