= 2009 Philadelphia International Championship =

Race details
- Dates: June 7
- Stages: 1
- Distance: 156 mi (251.1 km)
- Winning time: 6h 24' 04"

Results
	Winner	André Greipel (GER)	(Team Columbia–High Road)
	Second	Greg Henderson (NZL)	(Team Columbia–High Road)
	Third	Kirk O'Bee (USA)	(Bissell)

The 2009 Philadelphia International Championship was the 25th running of the cycling race, which took place on June 7, 2009. It was won by Team Columbia–High Road's André Greipel.

== Results ==
	Cyclist	Team	Time
1	André Greipel (GER)	Team Columbia–High Road	6h 24' 04"
2	Greg Henderson (NZL)	Team Columbia–High Road	s.t.
3	Kirk O'Bee (USA)	Bissell	+ 1"
4	Harald Starzengruber (AUT)	Elk Haus	s.t.
5	David Vitoria (SUI)	Rock Racing	s.t.
6	Keven Lacombe (CAN)	Planet Energy	s.t.
7	Alejandro Borrajo (ARG)	Colavita–Sutter Home	s.t.
8	Christofer Stevenson (SWE)	Swedish National Team	s.t.
9	Lucas Sebastian Haedo (ARG)	Colavita–Sutter Home	s.t.
10	Andrew Pinfold (CAN)	OUCH–Maxxis	s.t.
