= Lucas Eriksson =

Swedish cyclist (born 1996)

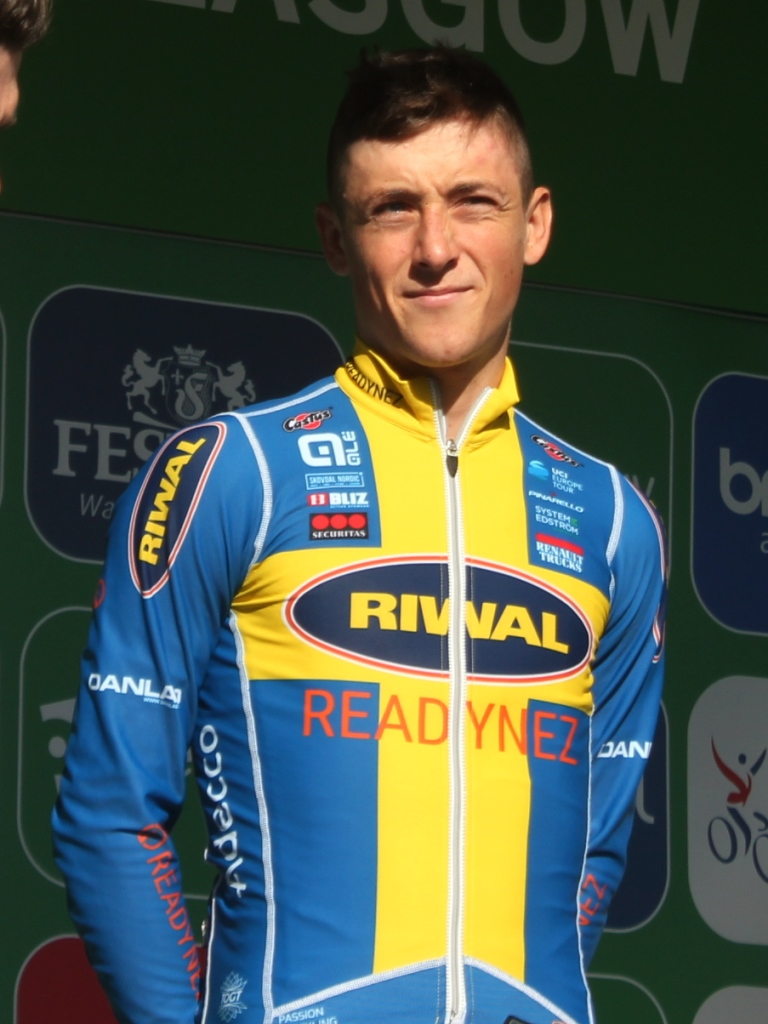
- Eriksson at the 2019 Tour of Britain

Personal information
- Full name: Lucas Eriksson
- Born: 10 April 1996 (age 30) Gånghester, Sweden
- Height: 179 cm (5 ft 10 in)
- Weight: 64 kg (141 lb)

Cycling career
- Sport: Cycling
- Current team: Retired
- Discipline: Road
- Role: Rider

Amateur team
- 2018: Motala AIF CK

Professional teams
- 2015–2016: Team Tre Berg–Bianchi
- 2017: SEG Racing Academy
- 2019–2022: Riwal Readynez
- 2023–2025: Tudor Pro Cycling Team

Lucas Eriksson (born 10 April 1996) is a Swedish former cyclist, who competed as a professional from 2015 to 2025. His brother Jacob is also a professional cyclist.

== Major results ==
2013
1st Mountains classification, Trofeo Karlsberg
6th Road race, UCI Junior Road World Championships
2014
1st Stage 3 Peace Race Juniors
1st Mountains classification, GP Général Patton
2nd Time trial, National Junior Road Championships
7th Road race, UCI Junior Road World Championships
8th Paris–Roubaix Juniors
9th Overall Oberösterreich Juniorenrundfahrt
2015
6th Skive–Løbet
2016
1st Road race, National Under-23 Road Championships
9th Overall Tour de Bretagne
2018
1st Road race, National Road Championships
4th Scandinavian Race Uppsala
5th Road race, UEC European Under-23 Road Championships
6th Overall Tour of Estonia
7th Ringerike GP
9th GP Horsens
10th Himmerland Rundt
2019
1st Road race, National Road Championships
10th GP Industria & Artigianato di Larciano
2020
3rd Road race, National Road Championships
2021
1st Overall Circuit des Ardennes

1st Stage 1

3rd Road race, National Road Championships
3rd Lillehammer GP
8th Overall Tour of Norway
10th Overall Danmark Rundt
2022
1st Road race, National Road Championships
1st Overall Circuit des Ardennes
1st Overall Kreiz Breizh Elites
9th Lillehammer GP
2023
1st Road race, National Road Championships
10th Rund um Köln
2025
9th Tro-Bro Léon
