= Elfstedenrace =

Road cycling race

Visit Friesland Elfsteden Race
Race details
- Date: October
- Region: Friesland, Netherlands
- Discipline: Road
- Competition: UCI Europe Tour
- Type: One-day race
- Organiser: Courage Events
- Web site: elfstedenrace.nl

History
- First edition: 2022
- Editions: 3 (as of 2024)
- First winner: Elmar Reinders (NED)
- Most wins: No repeat winners
- Most recent: Taco van der Hoorn (NED)

The Visit Friesland Elfsteden Race is a one-day road cycling race held annually in Friesland, the Netherlands. It was first held in 2022, on the UCI Europe Tour calendar in category 1.2, before upgrading to 1.1 status in 2023. The race starts and finishes in Leeuwarden.

== Winners ==
| Year | Country | Rider | Team |
|---|---|---|---|
| 2022 | Netherlands | Elmar Reinders | Riwal Cycling Team |
| 2023 | Belgium | Jasper Philipsen | Alpecin–Deceuninck |
| 2024 | Netherlands | Taco van der Hoorn | Intermarché–Wanty |
