= Jacob Eriksson =

Swedish cyclist (born 1999)

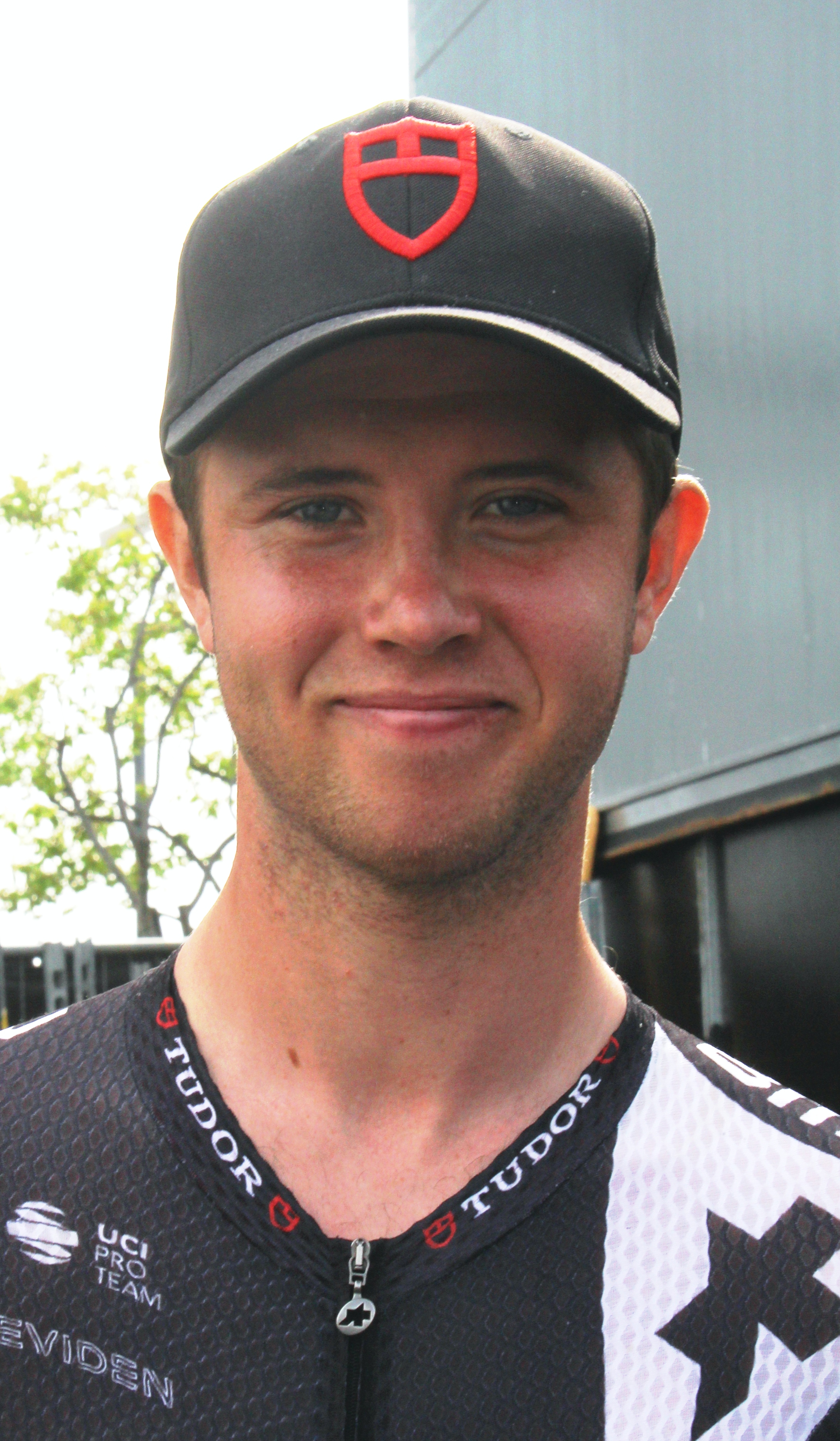
- Jacob Eriksson (2023)

Personal information
- Born: 1 October 1999 (age 27) Gånghester, Sweden
- Height: 1.80 m (5 ft 11 in)

Cycling career
- Sport: Cycling
- Current team: Tudor Pro Cycling Team
- Discipline: Road
- Role: Rider

Professional teams
- 2018: Destil–Parkhotel Valkenburg
- 2019–2021: Team Coop
- 2022: Riwal Cycling Team
- 2023–: Tudor Pro Cycling Team

Major wins
- One-day races and Classics National Road Race Championships (2024)

Jacob Eriksson (born 1 October 1999) is a Swedish cyclist, who currently rides for UCI ProTeam Tudor Pro Cycling Team. His brother Lucas is also a professional cyclist on the same team.

== Major results ==
2016
1st Mountains classification, Tour du Pays de Vaud
3rd Road race, National Junior Road Championships
2017
1st Road race, National Junior Road Championships
1st Mountains classification, Grand Prix Rüebliland
6th Overall Peace Race Juniors
2018
2nd Road race, National Under-23 Road Championships
2019
2nd Road race, National Under-23 Road Championships
2020
1st Road race, National Under-23 Road Championships
2nd Road race, National Road Championships
2021
4th Lillehammer GP
5th Gylne Gutuer
7th Skive–Løbet
9th Overall Arctic Race of Norway
2022
3rd Road race, National Road Championships
4th Volta Limburg Classic
7th Overall Circuit des Ardennes
2024 (1 pro win)
1st Road race, National Road Championships
