= Curt Söderlund =

Swedish cyclist (1945–2024)

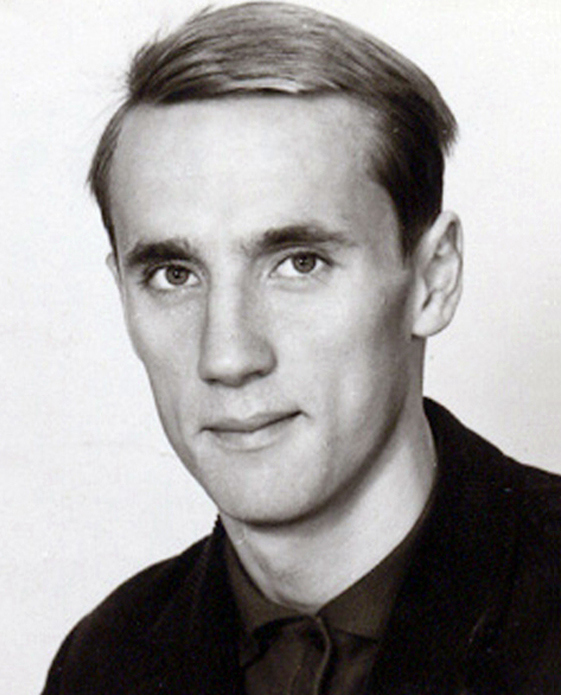

Personal information
- Born: 2 September 1945 Huddinge, Sweden
- Died: 4 June 2024 (aged 78)
- Height: 188 cm (6 ft 2 in)
- Weight: 74 kg (163 lb)

Cycling career
- Sport: Cycling

Amateur team
- 1964–1973: CK Falken

Curt Joel Söderlund (2 September 1945 – 4 June 2024) was a Swedish road racing cyclist who won the Tour du Maroc in 1968. He also won the individual national title in 1964, 1968, 1970 and 1973, placing third in 1969. Söderlund finished fifth at the 1967 UCI Road World Championships and 51st at the 1968 Olympics.
