= Owe Adamson =

Swedish cyclist (1935–2023)

Personal information
- Born: 8 March 1935 Mariestad, Sweden
- Died: 1 August 2023 (aged 88) Örebro, Sweden

Cycling career
- Sport: Cycling

Per Owe Adamson (8 March 1935 – 1 August 2023) was a Swedish cyclist. He competed in the individual road race and team time trial events at the 1960 Summer Olympics.

Adamson died in Örebro on 1 August 2023, at the age of 88.
