= Leif Hansson =

Swedish cyclist (born 1946)

Personal information
- Full name: Leif Anders Valfrid Hansson
- Born: 18 March 1946 (age 80) Ystad, Sweden

Cycling career
- Sport: Cycling

Leif Hansson (born 18 March 1946) is a Swedish former cyclist. He competed at the 1972 Summer Olympics and the 1976 Summer Olympics. His sporting career began with IK Vinco Ystad.
