= Lars Nordwall =

Swedish cyclist

Personal information
- Born: 22 September 1928 Grundsunda, Sweden
- Died: 27 October 2004 (aged 76) Linköping, Sweden

Cycling career
- Sport: Cycling

Lars Nordwall (22 September 1928 – 27 October 2004) was a Swedish cyclist. He competed at the 1952 and 1956 Summer Olympics.
