= Marianne Berglund =

Swedish cyclist

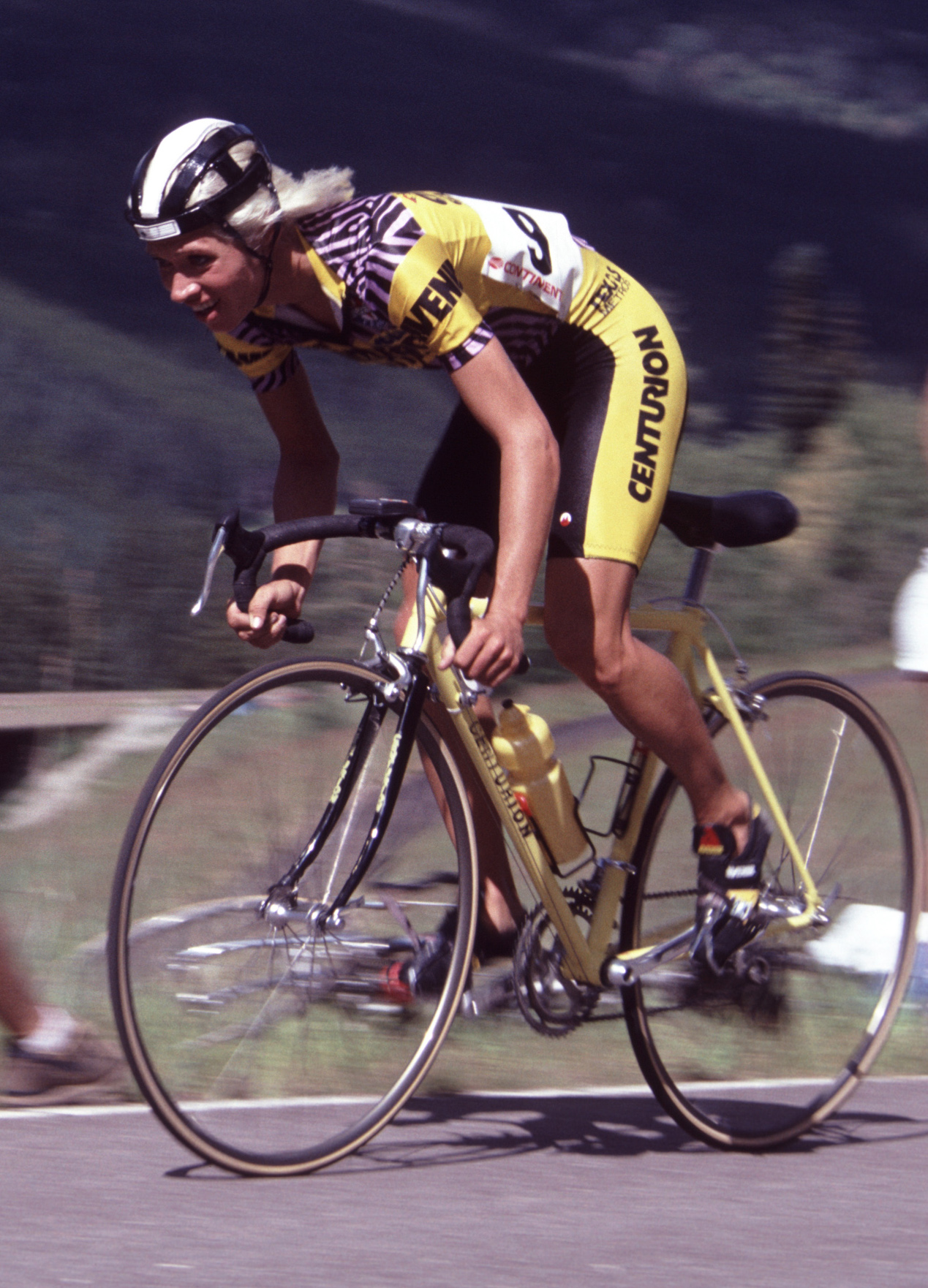
- Marianne Berglund riding in the Vail Time Trial, 1986

Personal information
- Full name: Marianne Berglund
- Born: 23 June 1963 (age 63) Skellefteå, Sweden

Cycling career
- Sport: Cycling
- Current team: Retired
- Discipline: Road
- Role: Rider

Major wins
- UCI Road World Championships - Women’s Road Race (1983)
Medal record
Representing Sweden
Women's Road bicycle racing
World Championships
| Gold medal – first place | 1983 Altenrhein | Women's Road Race |

Marianne Berglund (born 23 June 1963) is a Swedish former road racing cyclist. In the month of September in the year 1983 she won the women's road race during the UCI Road World Championships in Altenrhein, Switzerland. She also won the Tour of Texas. She rode in the 1984 Summer Olympics and the 1988 Summer Olympics. In 1990, she won the first edition of Tjejtrampet in her native Sweden.
