= Lars Wahlqvist =

Swedish cyclist

Personal information
- Born: 23 May 1964 (age 62) Motala, Sweden

Cycling career
- Sport: Cycling

Lars Wahlqvist (born 23 May 1964) is a former Swedish cyclist. He competed in the individual road race event at the 1984 Summer Olympics.
