= Kreiz Breizh Elites =

Cycle road race

Race details
- Date: July
- Region: Bretagne, France
- Discipline: Road
- Competition: UCI Europe Tour
- Type: Stage race
- Web site: sitekbe.com

History
- First edition: 2000
- Editions: 26 (as of 2026)
- First winner: Cédric Hervé (FRA)
- Most wins: Nick van der Lijke (NED)
- Most recent: Jermaine Zemke (GER)

Kreiz Breizh Elites is a French stage cycling race held annually in Bretagne. It is part of the UCI Europe Tour and rated 2.2. Before 2007, the race was reserved for under-23 riders only.

== Winners ==
Year	Country	Rider	Team
2000	France	Cédric Hervé	Jean Floc'h–Mantes
2001	France	Marc Staelen	Blois CAC 41
2002	France	Alexandre Naulleau	Vendée U
2003	France	Lloyd Mondory	Jean Floc'h–Moreac 56
2004	France	Cyrille Monnerais	Jean Floc'h–Moreac 56
2005	France	Mathieu Ladagnous	Entente Sud Gascogne
2006	Netherlands	Sjoerd Botter	ProComm–Van Hemert
2007	Estonia	Kalle Kriit	Roue d'Or de Saint-Amand
2008	France	Blel Kadri	Albi VS
2009	France	Antoine Dalibard	Bretagne–Schuller
2010	France	Johan Le Bon	Bretagne–Schuller
2011	France	Laurent Pichon	Bretagne–Schuller
2012	Denmark	André Steensen	Glud & Marstrand–LRØ
2013	Netherlands	Nick van der Lijke	Rabobank Development Team
2014	Italy	Matteo Busato	MG Kvis–Wilier
2015	Norway	August Jensen	Team Coop–Øster Hus
2016	Netherlands	Jeroen Meijers	Rabobank Development Team
2017	Denmark	Jonas Gregaard	Riwal Platform
2018	France	Damien Touzé	St. Michel–Auber93
2019	Netherlands	Mathijs Paasschens	Wallonie Bruxelles
2020	No race due to COVID-19 pandemic		
2021	Netherlands	Nick van der Lijke	Riwal Cycling Team
2022	Sweden	Lucas Eriksson	Riwal Cycling Team
2023	Netherlands	Hartthijs de Vries	TDT–Unibet Cycling Team
2024	France	Florian Dauphin	Arkéa–B&B Hôtels Continentale
2025	Ireland	Finn Crockett	VolkerWessels Cycling Team
2026	Germany	Jermaine Zemke	Rembe / Rad-Net
