= Jupp Ripfel =

Swedish cyclist

Personal information
- Born: 2 September 1938 (age 88) Nesselwang, Germany
- Height: 5 ft 9 in (175 cm)
- Weight: 72 kg (159 lb)

Cycling career
- Sport: Cycling

Jupp Ripfel (born 2 September 1938) is a former Swedish cyclist. He competed in the 1000m time trial at the 1968 Summer Olympics.
