= Peter Jonsson (cyclist) =

Swedish cyclist (born 1958)

Personal information
- Born: 12 April 1958 (age 68) Bjuv, Sweden

Cycling career
- Sport: Cycling

Peter Jonsson (born 12 April 1958) is a Swedish former cyclist. He competed in the individual road race event at the 1980 Summer Olympics.
