= Bernt Scheler =

Swedish cyclist

Personal information
- Born: 25 October 1955 (age 70) Burseryd, Sweden

Cycling career
- Sport: Cycling

Bernt Scheler (born 25 October 1955) is a Swedish former cyclist. He competed in the individual road race event at the 1980 Summer Olympics.
