= Elisabeth Westman =

Swedish cyclist

Personal information
- Full name: Karin Elisabeth Westman
- Born: 17 May 1966 (age 60) Västerås, Sweden
- Height: 163 cm (5 ft 4 in)
- Weight: 57 kg (126 lb)

Cycling career
- Sport: Cycling
- Discipline: Road cycling
- Role: Rider

Karin Elisabeth Westman (born 17 May 1966) is a road cyclist from Sweden. She represented her nation at the 1992 Summer Olympics in the women's road race.
