= Marie Höljer =

Swedish cyclist

Personal information
- Full name: Anna Marie Höljer-Serra
- Born: 22 October 1965 (age 60) Ramnäs, Sweden
- Height: 163 cm (5 ft 4 in)
- Weight: 56 kg (123 lb)

Cycling career
- Sport: Cycling
- Discipline: Road cycling
- Role: Rider

Anna Marie Höljer-Serra (born 22 October 1965) is a road cyclist from Sweden. She represented her nation at the 1988 Summer Olympics in the women's road race and at the 1992 Summer Olympics in the women's road race.
