= Kristina Ranudd =

Swedish cyclist

Personal information
- Born: 14 October 1962 (age 64) Uppsala, Sweden

Cycling career
- Sport: Cycling

Kristina Ranudd (born 14 October 1962) is a Swedish former cyclist. She competed in the women's road race event at the 1984 Summer Olympics.
