= Harry Snell (cyclist) =

Swedish cyclist

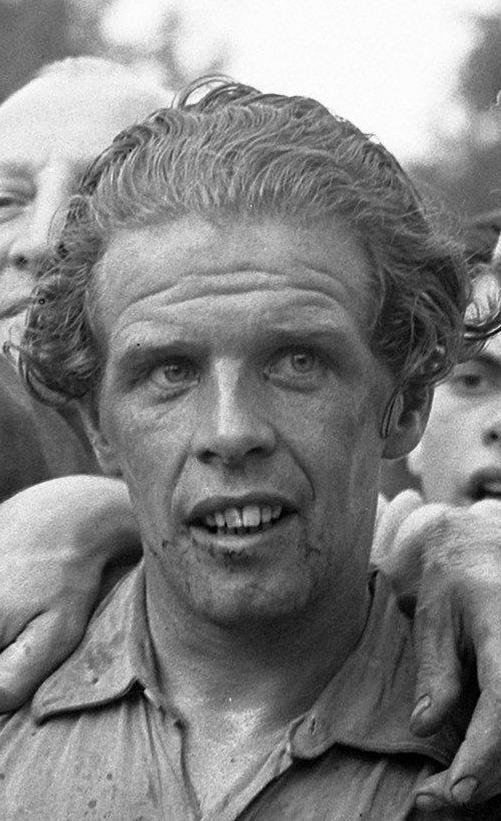
- Harry Snell in the year 1948

Personal information
- Born: 7 October 1916 Borås, Sweden
- Died: 8 May 1985 (aged 68) Borås, Sweden

Cycling career
- Sport: Cycling
- Discipline: Cycling
- Role: Rider
Medal record
Representing Sweden
World Championships
Gold medal – first place	1948 Valkenburg	Amateur Road Race

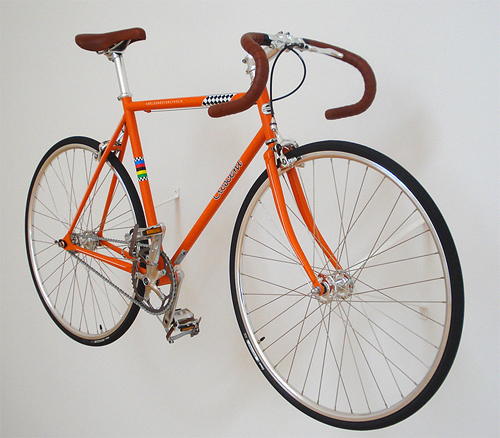
Crescent världsmästarcykel

Harry Snell (7 October 1916 – 8 May 1985) was a Swedish cyclist. He competed in the individual and team road race events at the 1948 Summer Olympics.

In the same year (1948), he became World Champion on the road for Amateurs.

== See also ==
- Crescent bicycles
