= Gånghester =

- Location within Västra Götaland Location within Sweden
- Coordinates: 57°42′N 13°01′E
- Country: Sweden
- Province: Västergötland
- County: Västra Götaland County
- Municipality: Borås Municipality

Area
  - Total: 1.17 km^{2} (0.45 sq mi)

Population (31 December 2010)
  - Total: 1,526
  - Density: 1,303/km^{2} (3,370/sq mi)
- Time zone: UTC+1 (CET)
  - Summer (DST): UTC+2 (CEST)

Gånghester is a locality situated in Borås Municipality, Västra Götaland County, Sweden. It had 1,526 inhabitants in 2010.
