= Riwal Cycling Team =

Danish cycling team

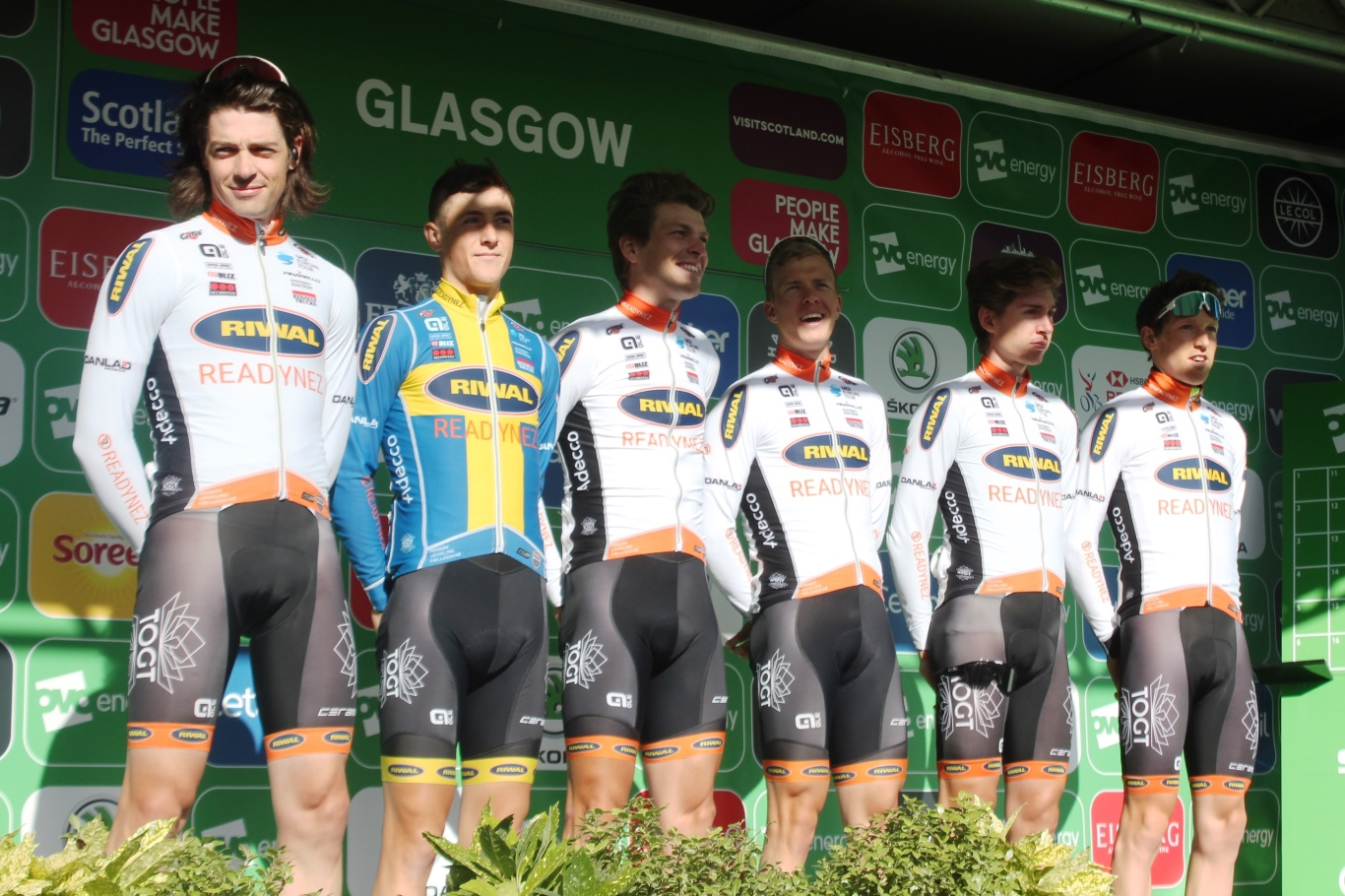

Team information
- UCI code: RIW
- Registered: Himmerland, Denmark
- Founded: 2009
- Discipline: Road
- Status: UCI Continental (2009–2018, 2021–2023); UCI ProTeam (2019–2020)
- Bicycles: Pinarello

Key personnel
- General manager: Mogens Tveskov
- Team managers: Michael Skelde; Peter-Lee Jefferies

Team name history
- 2009 2010–2012 2013 2014 2015–2017 2018 2019–2020 2020 2021–2022: Concordia–Vesthimmerland; Concordia Forsikring–Himmerland; Concordia Forsikring–Riwal; Riwal Cycling Team; Riwal Platform Cycling Team; Riwal CeramicSpeed Cycling Team; Riwal–Readynez Cycling Team; Riwal Securitas Cycling Team; Riwal Cycling Team

Riwal Cycling Team was a Danish UCI Continental cycling team based in Himmerland. Riwal participated in races in many countries around Europe. The team's most popular achievements have been the Danmark Rundt, the Olympia's Tour in the Netherlands and the Okolo Slovenska. The team had 10 full-time riders. Most of the team riders were Danish but also includes Swedish, Dutch and Norwegian members. The team had one sports manager and several freelancers. It was founded in 2009 and merged in 2023 with team Leopard Pro Cycling from Luxemburg, to form Leopard Riwal.

== Team history ==
About 70 business partners support the Riwal Cycling Team by small and large sponsorships. The end of season 2013 Nikola Aistrup conquered the points in the first days of the Tour of Denmark and later he took second place in the final Post Cup department: The rider, who for years has been one of the backbones at Concordia Forsikring–Riwal has recently signed with the new team, which from 2014 ran under the Riwal name.

It was announced on 22 August 2020 that security company Securitas would step up as a co-name sponsor for the rest of the 2020 season.

Due to funding issues, the team decided it would return to being a UCI Continental team in 2021 to ensure its survival, after a two-year stint as a UCI ProTeam.

== Team roster ==
As of 15 February 2022.

Rider	Date of birth
Loïc Bettendorff (LUX)	28 April 2001 (age 25)
Mathias Bregnhøj (DEN)	11 November 1995 (age 30)
Martijn Budding (NED)	31 August 1995 (age 31)
Jacob Eriksson (SWE)	1 October 1999 (age 26)
Lucas Eriksson (SWE)	10 April 1996 (age 30)
Christoffer Lisson (DEN)	28 November 1995 (age 30)

Rider	Date of birth
Morten Aalling Nørtoft (DEN)	5 September 2002 (age 24)
Elmar Reinders (NED)	14 March 1992 (age 34)
Alexander Salby (DEN)	4 June 1998 (age 28)
Kasper Viberg Søgaard (DEN)	12 September 2001 (age 24)
Emil Vinjebo (DEN)	24 March 1994 (age 32)
Søren Vosgerau (DEN)	16 March 2000 (age 26)

== Major wins ==
2010
Stage 8 Vuelta Mexico Telmex, Philip Nielsen
Scandinavian Race Uppsala, Philip Nielsen
2011
Stage 2b Le Triptyque des Monts et Châteaux, Rasmus Guldhammer
Denmark Time Trial Championships, Rasmus Quaade
2012
Stage 1 Tour d'Algérie, Lars Andersson
2013
Stage 2 Tour de Normandie, Martin Mortensen
Stage 4 Okolo Slovenska, Martin Mortensen
2014
Scandinavian Race Uppsala, Jonas Aaen Jørgensen
Stages 3 & 4 Dookoła Mazowsza, Alex Rasmussen
2015
Scandinavian Race Uppsala, Nicolai Brøchner
2016
Himmerland Rundt, Jonas Gregaard
2017
Himmerland Rundt, Nicolai Brøchner
Ronde van Overijssel, Nicolai Brøchner
Scandinavian Race Uppsala, Nicolai Brøchner
2018
Stage 3 Flèche du Sud, Andreas Kron
Stage 2 Tour of Estonia, Andreas Stokbro
Denmark U23 Time Trial Championships, Mathias Norsgaard
Chrono des Nations U23, Mathias Norsgaard
2019
Fyen Rundt, Rasmus Quaade
Scandinavian Race Uppsala, Rasmus Bøgh Wallin
Stage 1 Tour de Normandie, Nicolai Brøchner
Stage 2 Circuit des Ardennes, Alexander Kamp
Stage 3 Tour de Yorkshire, Alexander Kamp
Sweden Road Race Championships, Lucas Eriksson
2020
Stage 5 Tour de Luxembourg, Andreas Kron
Sweden Road Race Championships, Kim Magnusson
2021
Overall Kreiz Breizh Elites, Nick van der Lijke
Skive–Løbet, Elmar Reinders
PWZ Zuidenveld Tour, Elmar Reinders
Stage 4 Tour de Bretagne, Elmar Reinders
Overall Circuit des Ardennes, Lucas Eriksson

Stage 1, Lucas Eriksson

2022
Visit Friesland Elfsteden Race, Elmar Reinders
Stage 3 Olympia's Tour, Elmar Reinders
Overall Circuit des Ardennes, Lucas Eriksson

Stage 1, Elmar Reinders

Arno Wallaard Memorial, Elmar Reinders
Stage 5 Tour de Bretagne, Elmar Reinders
