= Germany at the UCI Road World Championships =

- IOC code: GER

Germany at the UCI Road World Championships is an overview of the German results (East German and West German results excluded) at the UCI Road World Championships.

== List of medalists ==
This is a list of elite and under-23 German medals. Since the 2012 UCI Road World Championships there is the men's and women's team time trial event for trade teams and these medals are included under the UCI registration country of the team.

Medal	Championship	Name	Event
Silver	(Hungary) 1928 Budapest	Herbert Nebe (GER)	Men's road race
Bronze	(Hungary) 1928 Budapest	Bruno Wolke (GER)	Men's road race
Silver	(Denmark) 1937 Copenhagen	Emil Kijewski (GER)	Men's road race
Silver	(Germany) 1991 Stuttgart	Germany	Men's team time trial
Bronze	(Norway) 1993 Oslo	Jan Ullrich (GER)	Men's road race
Silver	(Norway) 1993 Oslo	Christian Meyer (GER); Uwe Peschel (GER); Michael Rich (GER); Andreas Walzer (GER)	Men's team time trial
Bronze	(Italy) 1994 Agrigento	Jan Ullrich (GER)	Men's time trial
Bronze	(Italy) 1994 Agrigento	Ralf Grabsch (GER); Uwe Peschel (GER); Michael Rich (GER); Jan Schaffrath (GER)	Men's team time trial
Bronze	(Colombia) 1995 Duitama	Uwe Peschel (GER)	Men's time trial
Bronze	(Switzerland) 1996 Lugano	Andreas Klöden (GER)	Men's under-23 time trial
Bronze	(Spain) 1997 San Sebastián	Judith Arndt (GER)	Women's time trial
Bronze	(Netherlands) 1998 Valkenburg	Hanka Kupfernagel (GER)	Women's time trial
Bronze	(Netherlands) 1998 Valkenburg	Hanka Kupfernagel (GER)	Women's road race
Gold	(Italy) 1999 Verona	Jan Ullrich (GER)	Men's time trial
Bronze	(Italy) 1999 Verona	Matthias Kessler (GER)	Men's under-23 road race
Silver	(France) 2000 Plouay	Michael Rich (GER)	Men's time trial
Gold	(Portugal) 2001 Lisbon	Jan Ullrich (GER)	Men's time trial
Silver	(Portugal) 2001 Lisbon	Sebastian Lang (GER)	Men's under-23 time trial
Silver	(Belgium) 2002 Limburg	Michael Rich (GER)	Men's time trial
Bronze	(Belgium) 2002 Limburg	Erik Zabel (GER)	Men's road race
Gold	(Canada) 2003 Hamilton	Markus Fothen (GER)	Men's under-23 time trial
Silver	(Canada) 2003 Hamilton	Uwe Peschel (GER)	Men's time trial
Bronze	(Canada) 2003 Hamilton	Michael Rich (GER)	Men's time trial
Bronze	(Canada) 2003 Hamilton	Judith Arndt (GER)	Women's time trial
Gold	(Italy) 2004 Verona	Judith Arndt (GER)	Women's road race
Silver	(Italy) 2004 Verona	Erik Zabel (GER)	Men's road race
Silver	(Italy) 2004 Verona	Michael Rich (GER)	Men's time trial
Silver	(Italy) 2004 Verona	Judith Arndt (GER)	Women's time trial
Gold	(Italy) 2005	Regina Schleicher (GER)	Women's road race
Gold	(Austria) 2006 Salzburg	Gerald Ciolek (GER)	Men's under-23 road race
Silver	(Austria) 2006 Salzburg	Erik Zabel (GER)	Men's road race
Silver	(Austria) 2006 Salzburg	Trixi Worrack (GER)	Women's road race
Gold	(Germany) 2007 Stuttgart	Hanka Kupfernagel (GER)	Women's time trial
Bronze	(Germany) 2007 Stuttgart	Stefan Schumacher (GER)	Men's road race
Gold	(Italy) 2008 Varese	Bert Grabsch (GER)	Men's time trial
Silver	(Italy) 2008 Varese	Patrick Gretsch (GER)	Men's under-23 time trial
Bronze	(Italy) 2008 Varese	Judith Arndt (GER)	Women's road race
Bronze	(Italy) 2008 Varese	Judith Arndt (GER)	Women's time trial
Bronze	(Italy) 2008 Varese	John Degenkolb (GER)	Men's under-23 road race
Bronze	(Switzerland) 2009 Mendrisio	Tony Martin (GER)	Men's time trial
Bronze	(Switzerland) 2009 Mendrisio	Patrick Gretsch (GER)	Men's under-23 time trial
Silver	(Australia) 2010 Melbourne and Geelong	Judith Arndt (GER)	Women's time trial
Silver	(Australia) 2010 Melbourne and Geelong	John Degenkolb (GER)	Men's under-23 road race
Bronze	(Australia) 2010 Melbourne and Geelong	Tony Martin (GER)	Men's time trial
Bronze	(Australia) 2010 Melbourne and Geelong	Marcel Kittel (GER)	Men's under-23 time trial
Gold	(Denmark) 2011 Copenhagen	Tony Martin (GER)	Men's time trial
Gold	(Denmark) 2011 Copenhagen	Judith Arndt (GER)	Women's time trial
Bronze	(Denmark) 2011 Copenhagen	André Greipel (GER)	Men's road race
Bronze	(Denmark) 2011 Copenhagen	Ina-Yoko Teutenberg (GER)	Women's road race
Gold	(Netherlands) 2012 Valkenburg	Tony Martin (GER)	Men's time trial
Gold	(Netherlands) 2012 Valkenburg	Judith Arndt (GER)	Women's time trial
Gold	(Netherlands) 2012 Valkenburg	Team Specialized–lululemon; Ellen van Dijk (NED); Charlotte Becker (GER); Amber Neben (USA); Evelyn Stevens (USA); Ina-Yoko Teutenberg (GER); Trixi Worrack (GER)	Women's team time trial
Gold	(Italy) 2013 Tuscany	Tony Martin (GER)	Men's time trial
Gold	(Spain) 2014 Ponferrada	Lisa Brennauer (GER)	Women's time trial
Gold	(Spain) 2014 Ponferrada	Lennard Kämna (GER)	Men's junior time trial
Gold	(Spain) 2014 Ponferrada	Lennard Kämna (GER)	Men's junior road race
Silver	(Spain) 2014 Ponferrada	Tony Martin (GER)	Men's time trial
Silver	(Spain) 2014 Ponferrada	Lisa Brennauer (GER)	Women's road race
Gold	(United States) 2015 Richmond	Velocio–SRAM; Alena Amialiusik (BLR); Lisa Brennauer (DEU); Karol-Ann Canuel (CAN); Barbara Guarischi (ITA); Mieke Kröger (DEU); Trixi Worrack (DEU)	Women's team time trial
Gold	(United States) 2015 Richmond	Leo Appelt	Men's junior time trial
Silver	(United States) 2015 Richmond	Maximilian Schachmann	Men's under-23 time trial
Bronze	(United States) 2015 Richmond	Lisa Brennauer	Women's time trial
Bronze	(United States) 2015 Richmond	Lennard Kämna	Men's under-23 time trial

=== Medals by year ===
Championship	Gold	Silver	Bronze	Total	Rank
(Hungary) 1928 Budapest	0	1	1	2	
(Denmark) 1937 Copenhagen	0	1	0	1	
(Germany) 1991 Stuttgart	0	1	0	1	
(Norway) 1993 Oslo	1	1	0	2	
(Italy) 1994 Agrigento	0	0	2	2	
(Colombia) 1995 Duitama	0	0	1	1	
(Switzerland) 1996 Lugano	0	0	1	1	
(Spain) 1997 San Sebastián	0	0	1	1	
(Netherlands) 1998 Valkenburg	0	0	2	2	
(Italy) 1999 Verona	1	0	1	2	
(France) 2000 Plouay	0	1	0	1	
(Portugal) 2001 Lisbon	1	1	0	2	
(Belgium) 2002 Limburg	0	1	1	2	
(Canada) 2003 Hamilton	1	1	2	4	
(Italy) 2004 Verona	1	3	0	4	
(Austria) 2005	1	0	0	1	
(Austria) 2006 Salzburg	1	2	0	3	
(Germany) 2007 Stuttgart	1	0	1	2	
(Italy) 2008 Varese	1	1	3	5	
(Switzerland) 2009 Mendrisio	0	0	2	2	
(Australia) 2010 Melbourne and Geelong	0	2	2	4	
(Denmark) 2011 Copenhagen	2	0	2	4	
(Netherlands) 2012 Valkenburg	3	0	0	3	
(Italy) 2013 Tuscany	1	0	0	1	7
(Spain) 2014 Ponferrada	3	2	0	5	1

=== Medals by discipline ===
Updated after 21 September of the 2015 UCI Road World Championships

Event	Gold	Silver	Bronze	Total	Rank
Men's road race	1	4	4	9	
Men's time trial	6	5	5	16	1
Men's team time trial	0	2	1	3	
Women's road race	2	1	3	6	
Women's time trial	4	2	5	11	
Women's team time trial	2	0	0	2	
Men's under-23 road race	1	1	2	4	
Men's under-23 time trial	1	3	4	8	
Men's junior road race	2	0	1	3	
Men's junior time trial	6	4	4	14	
Women's junior road race					
Women's junior time trial					
Total	25	23	29	77	
