= 1928 UCI Road World Championships – Men's road race =

Men's Individual Road Race
1928 UCI Road World Championships
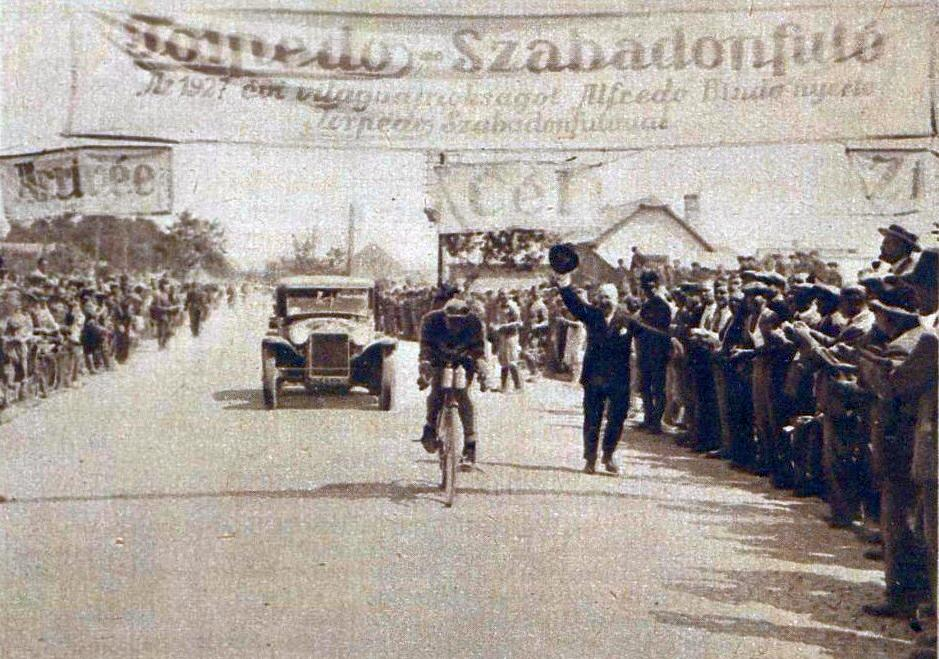
- Georges Ronsse arriving solo at the finish line

Race details
- Dates: 16 August 1928
- Stages: 1
- Distance: 191.7 km (119.1 mi)
- Winning time: 6h 20' 10"

Results
	Winner	Georges Ronsse (BEL)	(Belgium)
	Second	Herbert Nebe (GER)	(Germany)
	Third	Bruno Wolke (GER)	(Germany)

The men's road race at the 1928 UCI Road World Championships was the second edition of the event. The race took place on Thursday 16 August 1928 in Budapest, Hungary. The race was won by Georges Ronsse of Belgium.

== Race report ==
The 192 kilometer race was held on dusty, unpaved and stony roads and in scorching heat. After 45 kilometers Jules Vanhevel attacked and only Georges Ronsse joined him. The others hesitated and the two Belgians were able to gain a lead of several minutes. The Italian favorites Costante Girardengo and defending champion Alfredo Binda were great rivals and did not want to ride for each other; eventually they would both give up. Gaetano Belloni sacrificed himself, but he was set back by tire failure, just like several other participants.

Along the way, Vanhevel fell after colliding with an ox team and injured himself in the fall. He was able to return to Ronsse, but when he attacked on a slope 70 km from the end, Vanhevel had to pass and give up. Ronsse was able to win with a lead of almost 20 minutes over the Germans Nebe and Wolke, which is still the largest lead with which a world championship has been won.

== Final classification ==
General classification

Rank	Rider	Time
1st place, gold medalist(s)	Georges Ronsse (BEL)	6h 20' 10"
2nd place, silver medalist(s)	Herbert Nebe (GER)	+ 19' 43"
3rd place, bronze medalist(s)	Bruno Wolke (GER)	+ 19' 43"
4	Joseph Dervaes (BEL)	+ 36' 13"
5	Walter Cap (AUT)	+ 36' 13"
6	Max Bulla (AUT)	+ 36' 13"
7	Otto Cap (AUT)	+ 36' 13"
8	Ferdinand Le Drogo (FRA)	+ 42' 26"
