= 2012 UCI Road World Championships – Men's junior time trial =

Men's junior time trial
2012 UCI Road World Championships

Race details
- Dates: 17 September 2012
- Stages: 1

The Men's junior time trial of the 2012 UCI Road World Championships was a cycling event that took place on 17 September 2012 in Limburg, the Netherlands.

== Final classification ==
	Cyclist	Nation		Time
1	Oskar Svendsen	Norway	in	35 min 34 s 75
2	Matej Mohorič	Slovenia	+	7 s 04
3	Maximilian Schachmann	Germany		11 s 83
4	Alexander Morgan	Australia		12 s 60
5	Mathias Krigbaum	Denmark		13 s 68
6	Nathan Van Hooydonck	Belgium		19 s 37
7	Brent Luyckx	Belgium		20 s 53
8	Mads Würtz Schmidt	Denmark		21 s 75
9	Ryan Mullen	Ireland		26 s 16
10	Taylor Eisenhart	United States		26 s 29
11	Gregory Daniel	United States		26 s 71
12	Marcus Fåglum Karlsson	Sweden		29 s 61
13	Szymon Rekita	Poland		36 s 67
14	Dmitriy Rive	Kazakhstan		44 s 34
15	Élie Gesbert	France		48 s 24
16	Jan Brockhoff	Germany		50 s 37
17	Jonathan Dibben	Great Britain		50 s 76
18	Peter Mathiesen	Denmark		58 s 73
19	Przemysław Kasperkiewicz	Poland		1 min 03 s 15
20	David Per	Slovenia		1 min 06 s 20
21	Viktor Okishev	Kazakhstan		1 min 08 s 74
22	Ildar Arslanov	Russia		1 min 09 s 15
23	Hayden McCormick	New Zealand		1 min 10 s 77
24	Lukas Spengler	Switzerland		1 min 22 s 08
25	José Hernández	Colombia		1 min 23 s 23
26	Bruno Maltar	Croatia		1 min 25 s 15
27	Óscar González	Spain		1 min 28 s 60
28	Giacomo Peroni	Italy		1 min 30 s 37
29	Mattia Frapporti	Italy		1 min 32 s 39
30	Joeri Leijs	Netherlands		1 min 32 s 79
31	Nigel Ellsay	Canada		1 min 37 s 36
32	Tom Bohli	Switzerland		1 min 38 s 11
33	William Muñoz	Colombia		1 min 43 s 10
34	Mário Daško	Slovakia		1 min 45 s 33
35	Tao Geoghegan Hart	Great Britain		1 min 51 s 94
36	Chun Wing Leung	Hong Kong		1 min 55 s 41
37	Ben Perry	Canada		1 min 56 s 48
38	Fredrik Ludvigsson	Sweden		2 min 07 s 02
39	Nick Bain	New Zealand		2 min 09 s 62
40	Uladzislau Dubouski	Belarus		2 min 10 s 07
41	Amund Jansen	Norway		2 min 11 s 30
42	Hiroki Nishimura	Japan		2 min 12 s 63
43	Rostyslav Chernysh	Ukraine		2 min 13 s 11
44	Haitam Gaiz	Morocco		2 min 18 s 81
45	Michal Schlegel	Czech Republic		2 min 27 s 69
46	Aliaksandr Riabushenko	Belarus		2 min 29 s 08
47	Raimondas Rumšas	Lithuania		2 min 29 s 73
48	Krists Neilands	Latvia		2 min 31 s 06
49	Rohan Du Plooy	South Africa		2 min 32 s 65
50	David Klein	Luxembourg		2 min 36 s 79
51	Peteris Janevics	Latvia		2 min 36 s 95
52	Maxime Piveteau	France		2 min 37 s 54
53	José Luis Rodríguez	Chile		2 min 38 s 94
54	Mantas Petrusevicius	Lithuania		2 min 41 s 77
55	Danylo Kondakov	Ukraine		2 min 43 s 23
56	Piotr Havik	Netherlands		3 min 02 s 32
57	Feritcan Şamlı	Turkey		3 min 15 s 18
58	Andrei Calvalsiuc	Moldova		3 min 15 s 75
59	Josip Rumac	Croatia		3 min 17 s 43
60	Abderrahmane Bechlagheme	Algeria		3 min 27 s 07
61	Ali Nouisri	Tunisia		3 min 56 s 38
62	Abderrahim Aouida	Morocco		4 min 21 s 46
63	Artem Nych	Russia		4 min 26 s 65
64	Abderrahmane Mansouri	Algeria		4 min 45 s 41
65	Mohamad Azrul Taufiq Anuar	Malaysia		6 min 45 s 83
66	Hamza Fatnassi	Tunisia		8 min 45 s 20
