= David Millar =

Scottish cyclist (born 1977)

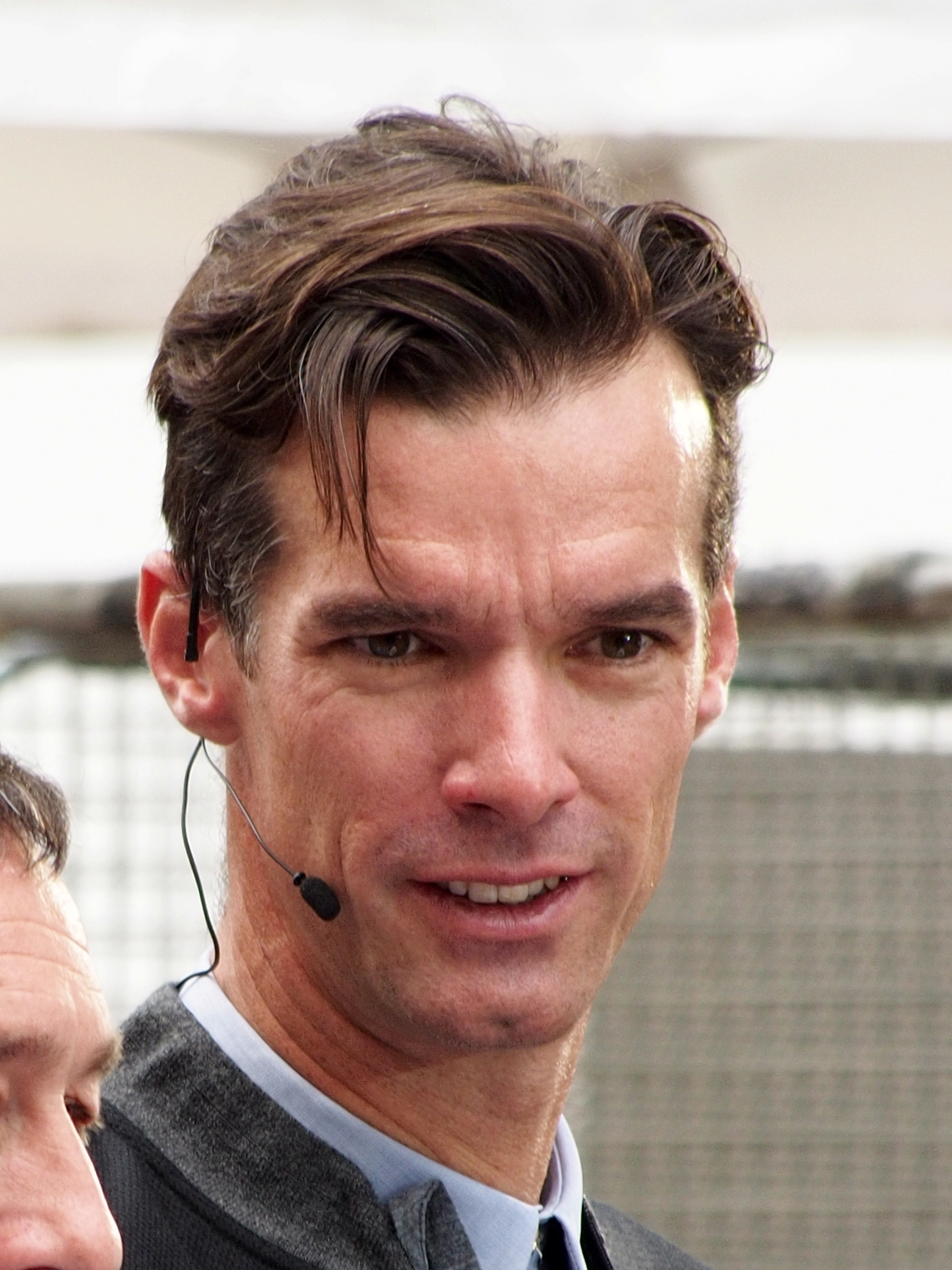
- Millar at the 2014 Tour de France

Personal information
- Nicknames: Millar-Time, Le Dandy
- Born: 4 January 1977 (age 49) Mtarfa, Malta
- Height: 1.92 m (6 ft 4 in)
- Weight: 76 kg (168 lb; 12.0 st)

Cycling career
- Sport: Cycling
- Discipline: Road
- Role: Rider
- Rider type: Time-trialist

Amateur teams
- 1996: High Wycombe CC
- 1996: VC St-Quentin

Professional teams
- 1997–2004: Cofidis
- 2006–2007: Saunier Duval–Prodir
- 2008–2014: Garmin–Sharp

Major wins
- Grand Tours Tour de France 4 individual stages (2000, 2002, 2003, 2012) 1 TTT stage (2011) Giro d'Italia 1 individual stage (2011) 1 TTT stage (2008) Vuelta a España 5 individual stages (2001, 2003, 2006, 2009) Stage races Danmark Rundt (2001) Three Days of De Panne (2010) One-day races and Classics National Road Race Championships (2007) National Time Trial Championships (2007)
Medal record
Representing Malta
Men's road bicycle racing
Games of the Small States of Europe
Gold medal – first place	2001 San Marino	Road race
Representing Great Britain
Men's road bicycle racing
World Championships
Silver medal – second place	2001 Lisbon	Time trial
Silver medal – second place	2010 Melbourne	Time trial
Disqualified	2003 Hamilton	Time trial
Representing Scotland
Men's road bicycle racing
Commonwealth Games
Gold medal – first place	2010 Delhi	Time trial
Bronze medal – third place	2010 Delhi	Road race

David Millar (born 4 January 1977) is a Scottish retired professional road racing cyclist. He rode for Cofidis from 1997 to 2004 and Garmin–Sharp from 2008 to 2014. He has won four stages of the Tour de France, five of the Vuelta a España and one stage of the Giro d'Italia. He was the British national road champion and the national time trial champion, both in 2007.

Millar was banned for two years in 2004 after he admitted to taking banned performance-enhancing drugs. Upon his return from his ban, Millar became an anti-doping campaigner, a stance which eventually resulted in journalist Alasdair Fotheringham describing him as an 'elder statesman' of cycling.

== Early life and education ==
Millar is the son of Gordon and Avril Millar, both Scots. His father was a pilot in the Royal Air Force and Millar was born in Mtarfa, Malta, while his father was based there for a three-year tour of duty. His mother worked as a teacher. He has a sister, Frances (Fran) who also works in cycling, currently as the chief executive officer of Team Ineos. The family returned to the United Kingdom, and lived at RAF Kinloss in Scotland before moving to Aylesbury, 60 km north-west of London. His father and mother divorced when Millar was 11 and his father moved to Hong Kong, when he joined the airline Cathay Pacific, which is based there. Millar considers Hong Kong as his home. Millar moved to Hong Kong to join his father when he was 13. He rode in BMX bike races in Hong Kong "and did pretty well." He bought a road bike in 1992 and raced at 6.30 in the morning before the roads began filling with traffic.

At King George V School he chose mathematics, economics and geography as his A-level, pre-university, examination subjects, then switched to art, graphics and sports studies at his father's suggestion. He completed his A-levels and, having moved back to England to be with his mother in Maidenhead, enrolled at an arts college. He started cycling with a club in High Wycombe, Buckinghamshire. His mother, Avril, took him there so that he would make new friends and have something to do. At age 18, a week before he was due to start at the arts college, he went to race in France. He joined a club at St-Quentin, in the Picardy region, and won eight races. Five professional teams (Note: Banesto, GAN, Casino, Festina–Lotus, Française des Jeux and Cofidis offered Millar his first professional contract) offered him a contract. He signed with Cyrille Guimard because his team, Cofidis, was based in the area and he knew of Guimard's skill in recognising young talent.

== Early career ==
=== 2000–2003: early years ===
In his first professional season, Millar won the prologue of the Tour de l'Avenir and the competition for the best young rider in the Mi-Août Breton. He profited from his background in 10-mile time-trials in Britain to win the first stage of the 2000 Tour de France, a 16 km time-trial at Futuroscope. He held the yellow jersey as leader of the general classification for a few days. He failed to repeat his feat at Dunkirk in 2001 after puncturing in a bend and crashing. He finished fifth in the prologue in 2002 on a rolling course at Luxembourg. His attempt to win the prologue in central Paris in the centenary Tour of 2003 ended when his chain dropped off 500 m before the finish. He lost by 0.14 s to Brad McGee. Millar had ridden a bike without a front derailleur to save weight. (Note: Riders rarely need more than one chain-ring in a time trial but the cage of a front gear, which wraps round the chain, makes the chain less likely to lift off in high and low gears.) He blamed his directeur sportif, Alain Bondue. "It wasn't a problem with my chainring; it was a problem with my team", he told journalists at the finish. He said Bondue had tried to save a few grams by removing the derailleur. Bondue said he had told Millar to use a front derailleur after other riders had similar problems. Bondue was demoted to logistics manager.

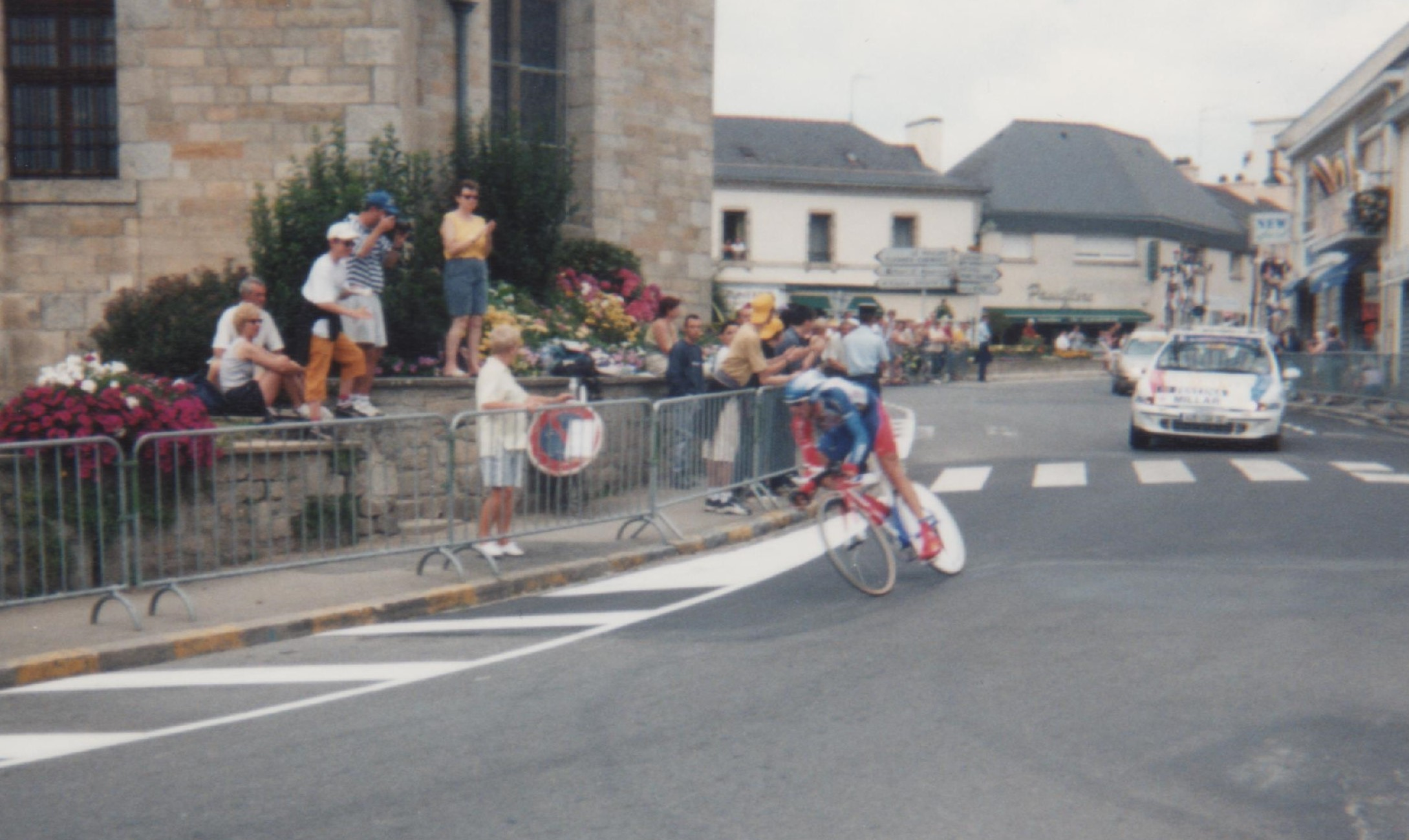
Millar at the 2002 Tour de France

Hopes of winning the Tour de France were fuelled by his stage win in the 2001 Vuelta a España, when he was in a breakaway with Santiago Botero on a mountain stage. Millar won a gold medal for Malta in the 2001 Games of the Small States of Europe, held in San Marino. Millar was selected for the Scotland team for the 2002 Commonwealth Games, but withdrew to compete for Cofidis instead.

In the 2002 Vuelta a España, stage 15 included the ascent of the Alto de l'Angliru in rain. Team cars stalled on the steepest part, some unable to restart because their tires slipped on messages painted by fans. Riders were caught behind them and others had to ride with flat tires because mechanics could not reach them. Millar crashed three times, and protested by handing in his race number a metre from the line, effectively abandoning from the race. The judges ruled he had not finished the stage and he was not reinstated, having already left for his home in Biarritz. He regretted his temper—he had been ninth—and later apologised to his team.

== Doping ==
Millar was dining in a restaurant with Dave Brailsford in Bidart, near Biarritz, on 23 June 2004 when he was approached by three plainclothes policemen of the Paris drug squad at 8.25pm. They detained Millar and took his watch, shoelaces, jewellery, keys and phone. After searching his home for two and a half hours they found empty phials of Eprex, a brand of the blood-boosting drug erythropoietin (EPO), and two used syringes. (Note: Some reports of the police search on 23 June 2004 say the syringes were on a book, others that they were in a hollowed-out book.) Millar claimed he had been given them as a gift at the Tour of Spain, and that he had taken them to Manchester and used them there. After that he had kept them as a souvenir. The detectives took Millar into custody.

The raid followed the arrest at the start of 2004 of Bogdan Madejak, a Cofidis soigneur. Police, looking to find out more about the drugs found on Madejak, turned their attention to another rider on the team, Philippe Gaumont, as he arrived at Orly airport on 20 January 2004. On 22 January 2004 the magazine, Le Point, published transcripts of police phone taps.

Gaumont said he had given Millar the drugs and syringes the day before the Tour finished on the Champs-Élysées in 2003, when Millar won the time-trial. Gaumont said he didn't know what was in the syringe but that "ça m'avait bloqué (that blocked me; i.e. kept me from going well)." Millar denied the claim to the investigating judge, and said that team doctor Menuet was the best person he had ever met and that he was "like a father to me at races." He denied Gaumont's claims that Millar had taken drugs by mixing Stilnox, a sleeping powder, with ephedrine, a stimulant. He called Gaumont a lunatic and said he was talking "absolute crap." But Millar's phone calls had been tapped for four months and Millar eventually confessed to police on 24 June 2004.

Millar admitted using EPO in 2001 and 2003. He blamed it on stress, in particular losing the prologue in the 2003 Tour and being beaten by Jan Ullrich in the 2001 world time trial championship. Under cycling rules a confession equates to a positive test.

British Cycling suspended him for two years in August 2004. He was disqualified as 2003 world time trial champion, fined CHF2,000 (approx. €1250), and disqualified from the 2003 Critérium du Dauphiné Libéré and 2001 Vuelta a España. Cofidis fired Millar and withdrew from racing while it carried out an internal investigation. Several Cofidis riders and assistants were fired. Alain Bondue, the team's director, and Menuet, the doctor, left the team. Vasseur was forbidden to start the 2004 Tour de France but later cleared.

Millar failed in an appeal to the Court of Arbitration for Sport to reduce his ban, but the court did backdate his suspension to the day he confessed, 24 June 2004.

Millar was prosecuted in a French court in Nanterre in 2006 with nine other defendants, mostly from Cofidis. The court decided it was not clear he had taken drugs in France and that charges could not be pursued. The doctor he had consulted lived in Spain, south of Biarritz and across the Pyrenees. Millar's statement to the judge stated that he had succumbed to the pressure of racing, the expectations placed on him by British fans, and an inability to make close friends. Winning the prologue of the Tour de France made things worse; he had worn the maillot jaune of leadership – his "dream", he said – and when it was all over he was back in his apartment with no friends and just a television for company.

Millar has claimed that doping gained him 25 seconds in the 2003 world time-trial championship. He toasted his championship in the Bellagio Casino in Las Vegas. But the suspension cost Millar his job, his income and his house. Millar then began abusing alcohol for much of a year. He said he had scraped by with the help of family and friends.

== Later career ==
=== 2005–2007: post-suspension ===
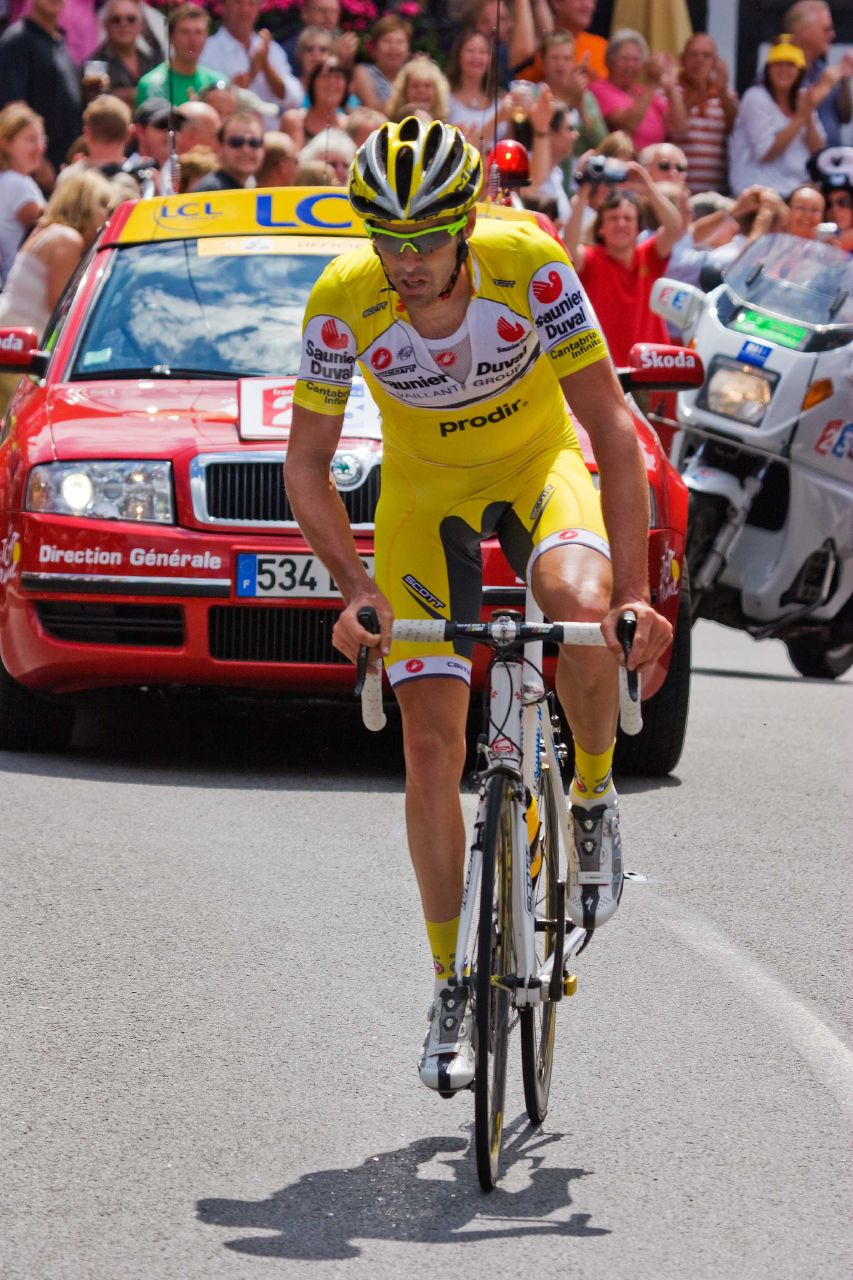
Millar at the 2007 Tour de France

Millar moved to Hayfield, on the edge of the Peak District of northern England, to be close to the Manchester Velodrome where British cycling has its headquarters. He joined a Spanish team, Saunier Duval–Prodir. Its manager, Mauro Gianetti, had contacted him nine months into his suspension.

Millar's suspension ended a week before the 2006 Tour de France and he rode with Saunier Duval–Prodir. He finished 17th in the prologue and 11th on the penultimate, time-trial stage. He finished 59th of 139 finishers, more than 2 hours behind the winner, Óscar Pereiro. (Note: Floyd Landis was later disqualified from the 2006 Tour de France for taking drugs and the win was given to Óscar Pereiro, who finished 57 seconds behind him.) In the 2006 Vuelta a España, Millar won in stage 14, a time trial around the city of Cuenca. On 3 October, he won the British 4,000m individual pursuit championship in 4m 22.32s at Manchester.

He left Saunier Duval–Prodir (Note: Saunier Duval–Prodir's leading rider, Riccardo Riccò, was disqualified for doping during the Tour de France of 2008. Millar told Le Journal du Dimanche on 20 July 2008: "I didn't see anything [doping] organised even if, at the time, there were suspicions about riders who were having exceptional performances. But there is no anti-doping culture in the team. I like the manager, Mauro Gianetti, a lot, but he is naive. He trusts people who don't deserve it. A positive dope test doesn't stop with the rider. It has ramifications. If Saunier Duval doesn't know that a rider is working with another doctor, outside the team, it's because it hasn't done what needs to be done.") to join an American team, Slipstream–Chipotle run by Jonathan Vaughters, a former rider. Vaughters stressed the team's stance against doping. In the 2007 season, Millar won both the British road and time trial championships and came second in the Eneco Tour, 11 seconds behind José Iván Gutiérrez. His other victory of the year came in the Paris–Nice, during which he won the prologue.

=== 2008–2014: career with Garmin ===
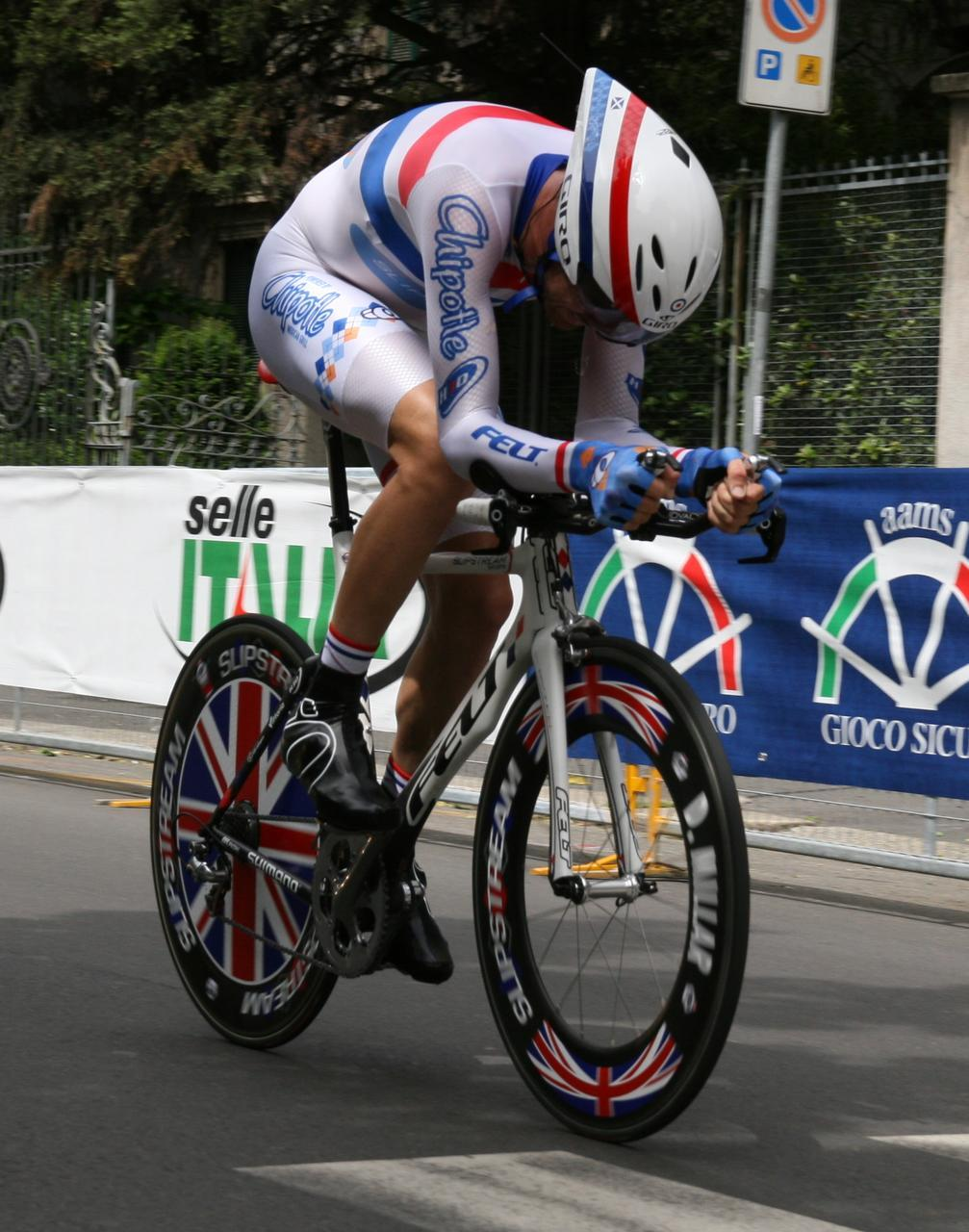
Millar at the 2008 Giro d'Italia

For the start of the 2008 season, Slipstream became known as Garmin Slipstream, and Millar took on part ownership of the team, in order to foster their anti-doping stance. He helped orchestrate Slipstream–Chipotle's victory in the Giro d'Italia opening team time trial. Millar was part of a five-man winning break on stage five of the 2008 Giro d'Italia when his chain broke in the last kilometre and he flung his bike to the roadside.

In the 2008 Tour de France, Millar came third in the time trial on stage four, 18 seconds behind the winner. Overall he finished 68th, 1h 59m 39s behind Carlos Sastre. His best results of the season came in the 2008 Tour of California in which he finished second overall.

Millar rode the 2009 Giro d'Italia and then the 2009 Critérium du Dauphiné Libéré, finishing ninth overall. He competed in both the Tour de France and the Vuelta a España. His best performance in a stage was winning the stage 20 time trial at the Vuelta. The race was Millar's first win for two years, and his fifth at the Vuelta.

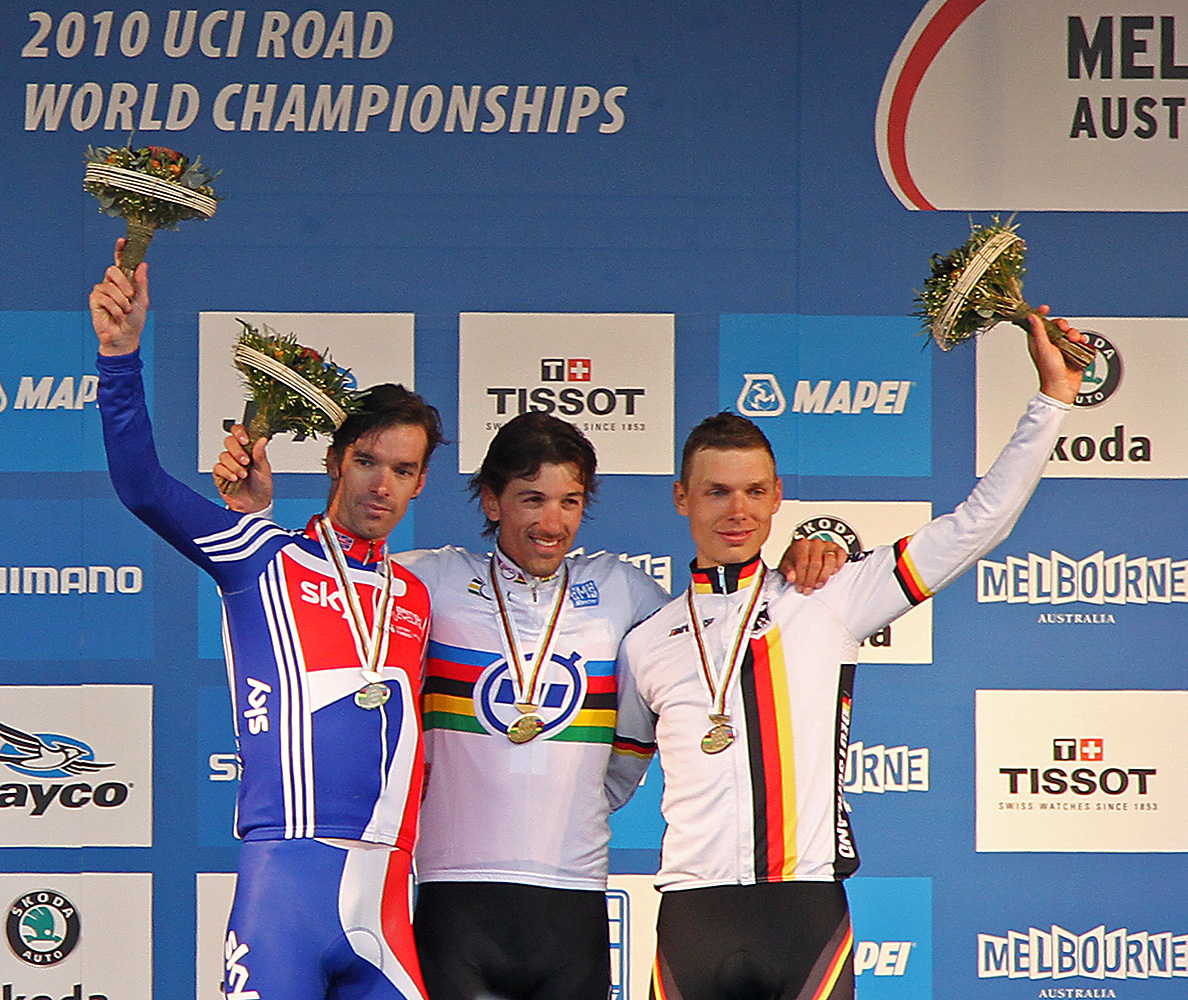
Elite Men's Time trial medallists: Millar, Fabian Cancellara and Tony Martin

2010 saw Millar continue his strong time-trial form, with stage wins at the Critérium International and the Three Days of De Panne. De Panne also saw Millar gain his first multi-stage race victory since the 2001 Circuit de la Sarthe. Millar had a number of high placings in major time trials earlier in the season – he finished third in the prologue of the 2010 Tour de France and second in stage three of the Critérium du Dauphiné. An injury in the Tour de France hampered the rest of his season, though he finished all three grand tours. Millar then matched his best clean placing at the Men's World Time-Trial Championships, finishing second behind Fabian Cancellara. Shortly after, at the Commonwealth Games, he won a gold medal in the time trial and a bronze in the road race.

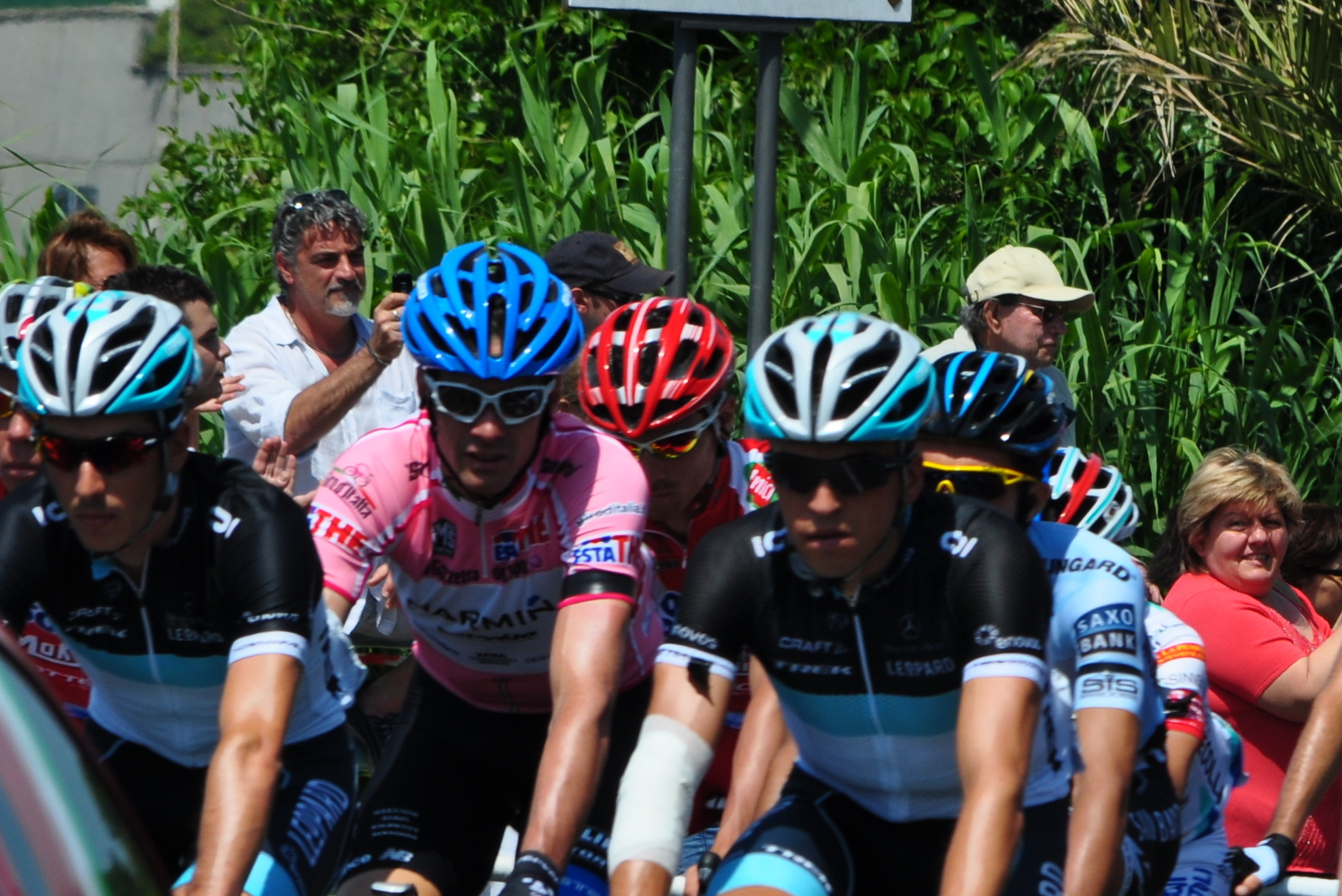
Millar (centre) wearing the Maglia rosa at the 2011 Giro d'Italia

2011 saw Millar suffer from illness early in the season, missing many of the classics. His best performance was a 3rd-place finish in the overall of the Circuit de la Sarthe. He recovered in time for the Giro d'Italia, finishing second on stage 3 to take the pink jersey as leader of the general classification. Millar's lead, however, was overshadowed by the death of Wouter Weylandt in the Giro on the same day; in the role of race leader, Millar helped organise the tributes to Weylandt's during the subsequent day's neutralised stage.

He later won the time-trial stage 21 of the Giro, meaning that he became only the third British rider – after Robert Millar and Mark Cavendish – to achieve victories in all three Grand Tours during his career. In June he published his autobiography titled Racing Through the Dark, which Richard Williams in The Guardian wrote was "one of the great first-person accounts of sporting experience". Millar was team captain of the Great Britain team that helped Cavendish win the 2011 UCI World Championships road race.

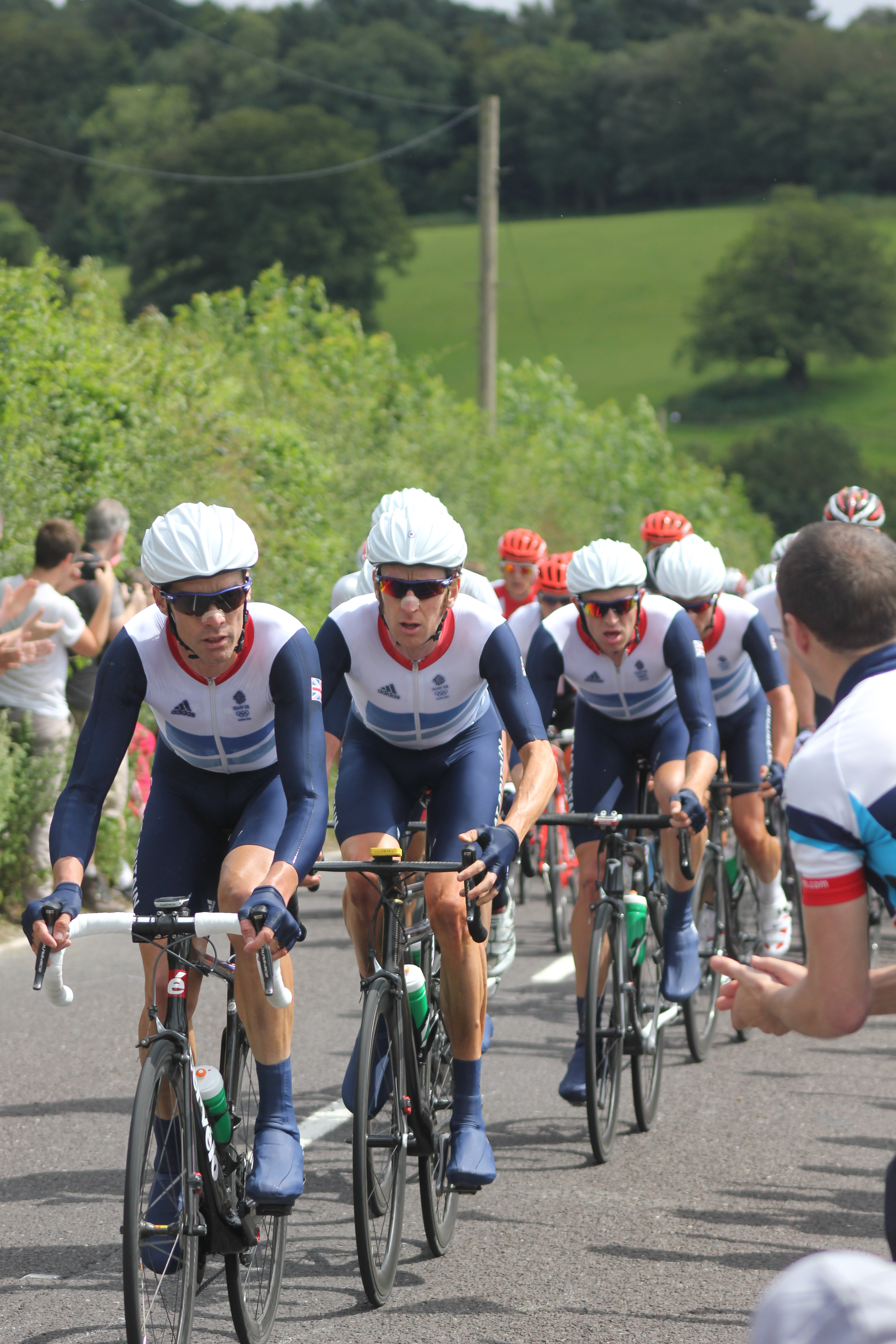
Millar on the front of the peloton during the 2012 Olympic Road Race

Millar fractured his collarbone in a crash in the 2012 E3 Harelbeke one-day race in Belgium on 23 March. He returned to competition at the Tour of Bavaria and the Critérium du Dauphiné, where his best result was a 9th place on stage 4. Despite his injuries earlier in the season, Millar was selected to ride his 11th Tour de France. He won stage 12 by escaping with four other riders, arriving five kilometres (3.1 mi) from the finish line in Annonay–Davézieux with more than ten minutes of an advantage over the bunch. He took the win after much cat-and-mouse-play with Jean-Christophe Péraud of Ag2r–La Mondiale. He was the fourth British rider to win a stage in a tour, as Bradley Wiggins became the second British rider to win the event (Nicole Cooke won the women's Tour in 2006). Millar was selected to race on the British Road Race Team for the London Olympics. He reprised his role of team captain from the 2011 World Championships, again aiming to steer Mark Cavendish to victory. Millar and GB teammates Bradley Wiggins, Ian Stannard and Chris Froome were forced to set the tempo for the majority of the race, with little help from the other nations, and were eventually unable to reel back a thirty-man breakaway that had gone clear on the final climb of the Box Hill circuit, leaving Cavendish to come in forty seconds behind the winner, Alexander Vinokourov.

Millar was not selected to make the 2014 Tour de France team, a decision that left him 'devastated and shocked'. Millar retired from professional cycling after the 2014 season with his last competitive start being at the Bec CC Hill Climb in October. The final year of Millar's career was captured by documentary maker Finlay Pretsell for the film Time Trial. Intended as an insight into the world of professional cycling, the film took on themes of aging and retirement as it traced Millar's growing realisation that he was unable to perform at his previous levels. Time Trial was released to cinemas in the UK on 29 June 2018.

=== Post-racing career ===
In March 2015 Millar revealed he was coaching former teammate Ryder Hesjedal, and he has taken a mentoring role with the Great Britain under-23 cycling squad. He represented the professional cyclists' body Cyclistes Professionnels Associes (CPA) on the UCI's working group to establish an Extreme Weather Protocol to provide clear guidance on procedures in the event of severe weather affecting a race; the protocol was first used at the 2016 Paris–Nice. In 2018, he announced that he would challenge incumbent CPA president Gianni Bugno for the leadership of the organisation, running on a manifesto which advocated democratic reforms to the union's voting system, a financial audit of its finances, and improving communication with riders. This was the first contested election in the CPA's history: Millar was defeated by Bugno, winning 96 votes to the latter's 379.

Millar launched his 'Chpt3' brand in 2015, collaborating with various partners to produce a range of cycling-related products, including bikes and clothing. He works as a cycling journalist and pundit, and from 2016 to 2025 was the co-commentator on ITV's coverage of the Tour de France and Vuelta a España, up until ITV rights ended. Millar also co-hosts Never Strays Far, a "cycling-adjacent" podcast, with fellow ITV commentator Ned Boulting and former pro Peter Kennaugh.

In 2025, Millar was appointed brand director of Factor Bikes.

== Personal life ==
On 9 September 2011, Millar's wife, Nicole, gave birth to their son, Archibald Millar, their second son, Harvey Millar, was born on 2 May 2013. Their daughter Maxine Millar was born on 31 December 2015.

In 2013, while giving consultation to the production of the film The Program, Millar hit his head on a low-hanging beam while walking through a hotel. The accident left him without a sense of smell.

Millar's sister, Fran, was appointed CEO of the cycling team Team Ineos in June 2019.

He is not related to Robert Millar, now living as Philippa York, a fellow road cyclist from the west of Scotland whose main success came in the mid-1980s.

== Major results ==
1994
2nd Overall Junior Tour of Wales
1996
2nd Paris–Évreux
1997
1st Prologue Tour de l'Avenir
1998
Tour de l'Avenir

1st Prologue & 6 (ITT)

1st Stage 3b (ITT) Three Days of De Panne
2nd Time trial, National Road Championships
2nd Overall Tour du Poitou-Charentes
1999
1st Manx International
2nd Time trial, National Road Championships
2nd Overall Critérium International
3rd Tour de Vendée
3rd Gran Premio di Chiasso
4th Overall Volta a la Comunitat Valenciana

1st Mountains classification

4th Overall Étoile de Bessèges
2000
Tour de France

1st Stage 1 (ITT)
Held after Stages 1–3
Held after Stage 1
Held after Stages 1–3

3rd Road race, National Road Championships
4th Overall Circuit de la Sarthe

1st Young rider classification

9th Overall Route du Sud

1st Stage 1b (ITT)

2001
1st Overall Circuit de la Sarthe

1st Young rider classification
1st Stages 4 (ITT) & 5

1st Overall Danmark Rundt

1st Young rider classification
1st Stage 4 (ITT)

Vuelta a España

1st Stages 1 (ITT) & 6
Held after Stages 1–3

1st Stage 4b (ITT) Euskal Bizikleta
1st Time trial, Games of the Small States of Europe
2nd Time trial, UCI Road World Championships
2nd Paris–Camembert
3rd Overall Tour de Wallonie
4th Overall Tour de Picardie
7th Overall Four Days of Dunkirk
2002
1st Stage 13 Tour de France
2nd Overall Clásica Internacional de Alcobendas
6th Time trial, UCI Road World Championships
10th Milano–Torino
2003

Voided results

~~1st Time trial, UCI Road World Championships~~
~~1st Stage 19 (ITT) Tour de France~~ (Note: Millar's victory on Stage 19 of the 2003 Tour de France was removed from his record at his own request due to doping)

1st Overall Tour de Picardie
1st Stage 17 Vuelta a España
1st Prologue Driedaagse van West-Vlaanderen
1st Stage 4 (ITT) Vuelta a Burgos
3rd Overall Critérium du Dauphiné Libéré
3rd Classique des Alpes
4th Overall Volta a la Comunitat Valenciana
2006
1st Individual pursuit, National Track Championships
1st Stage 14 (ITT) Vuelta a España
2007
National Road Championships

1st Road race
1st Time trial

1st Prologue Paris–Nice
2nd Overall Eneco Tour
Tour de France

Held after Stages 1–2

2008
1st Stage 1 (TTT) Giro d'Italia
2nd Overall Tour of California
3rd Time trial, National Road Championships
9th Time trial, UCI Road World Championships
2009
1st Stage 20 (ITT) Vuelta a España
9th Overall Critérium du Dauphiné Libéré
10th Overall Volta ao Algarve
Combativity award Stage 6 Tour de France
2010
Commonwealth Games

1st Time trial
3rd Road race

1st Overall Three Days of De Panne

1st Stage 3b (ITT)

1st Chrono des Nations
2nd Time trial, UCI Road World Championships
5th Overall Critérium International

1st Stage 3 (ITT)

2011
Giro d'Italia

1st Stage 21 (ITT)
Held after Stage 2

1st Stage 2 (TTT) Tour de France
2nd Overall Tour of Beijing
3rd Overall Circuit de la Sarthe
3rd Overall Eneco Tour
5th Chrono des Nations
7th Time trial, UCI Road World Championships
10th Overall Tour de Romandie
2012
1st Stage 12 Tour de France
5th Chrono des Nations
2013
3rd Road race, National Road Championships
2014
8th Time trial, Commonwealth Games

=== Grand Tour general classification results timeline ===
Grand Tour	2000	2001	2002	2003	2004	2005	2006	2007	2008	2009	2010	2011	2012	2013	2014
Giro d'Italia	—	—	—	—	—	—	—	—	94	DNF	DNF	99	—	DNF	—
Tour de France	62	DNF	68	55	—	—	56	68	67	82	157	76	106	113	—
Vuelta a España	—	41	DNF	103	—	—	64	—	—	80	108	—	—	—	144

=== Major championship results timeline ===
Event		1997	1998	1999	2000	2001	2002	2003	2004	2005	2006	2007	2008	2009	2010	2011	2012	2013	2014
Olympic Games	Time trial	Not held			16	Not held			—	Not held			—	Not held			—	Not held	
Olympic Games	Road race	Not held			—	Not held			—	Not held			—	Not held			108	Not held	
World Championships	Time trial	20	—	—	—	2	6	~~1~~	—	—	15	18	9	—	2	7	—	—	—
World Championships	Road race	—	—	—	—	DNF	DNF	86	—	—	35	54	DNF	DNF	DNF	114	—	—	DNF
Commonwealth Games	Time trial	NH	—	Not held			—	Not held			—	Not held			1	Not held			8
Commonwealth Games	Road race	NH	—	Not held			—	Not held			—	Not held			3	Not held			11
National Championships	Time trial	—	2	2	—	—	—	—	—	—	—	1	3	—	—	—	—	—	—
National Championships	Road race	—	—	—	3	—	—	—	—	—	—	1	25	—	—	—	—	3	DNF

Legend
—	Did not compete
DNF	Did not finish

== See also ==
- List of British cyclists who have led the Tour de France general classification
- List of doping cases in cycling
- Yellow jersey statistics
- Time Trial (film)

== Notes ==
Sporting positions
Preceded by Hamish Haynes	British National Road Race Championships; 2007	Succeeded by Rob Hayles
