= Joseph Dervaes =

Belgian cyclist

Personal information
- Full name: Joseph Dervaes
- Born: 27 October 1906 Wetteren, Belgium
- Died: 12 April 1986 (aged 79) Ghent, Belgium

Cycling career
- Sport: Cycling
- Role: Rider

Professional teams
- 1926-27: Labor-Dunlop
- 1929: Génial Lucifer-Hutchinson
- 1930-31: La Nordiste-Wolber
- 1933: Depas Cycles

Major wins
- One-day races and Classics National Road Race Championship (1928) Tour of Flanders (1929) Scheldeprijs (1926, 1928) De Drie Zustersteden (1928, 1929) Grote 1-MeiPrijs (1929, 1930, 1931)

Joseph Dervaes (27 October 1906 – 12 April 1986) was a Belgian racing cyclist. He won the Belgian national road race title in 1928 and the Tour of Flanders in 1929.

== Major results ==
1924
1st Antwerpen-Menen
1925
1st stage 3 Tour of Belgium independents
1926
1st Scheldeprijs
1st stage 2 Critérium des Aiglon
1927
3rd Overall Tour of Belgium
1928
1st Belgian National Road Race Championships, road race
1st Scheldeprijs
1st De Drie Zustersteden
1st Bruxelles-Paris
1st Omloop van Noord-België
2nd Schaal Sels
2nd Omloop der Vlaamse Gewesten
4th Road race, UCI World Championships
6th Paris–Tours
1929
1st Tour of Flanders
1st De Drie Zustersteden
1st Grote 1-MeiPrijs
1st Omloop van Noord-België
4th Road race, UCI World Championships
1930
1st Grote 1-MeiPrijs
1st Omloop van Noord-België
2nd Belgian National Road Race Championships, road race
2nd Brussel–Oostende
1931
1st Grote 1-MeiPrijs
1st Paris–Lille
2nd Antwerpen–Gent–Antwerpen
