= Georges Ronsse =

Belgian cyclist (1906–1969)

George Ronsse
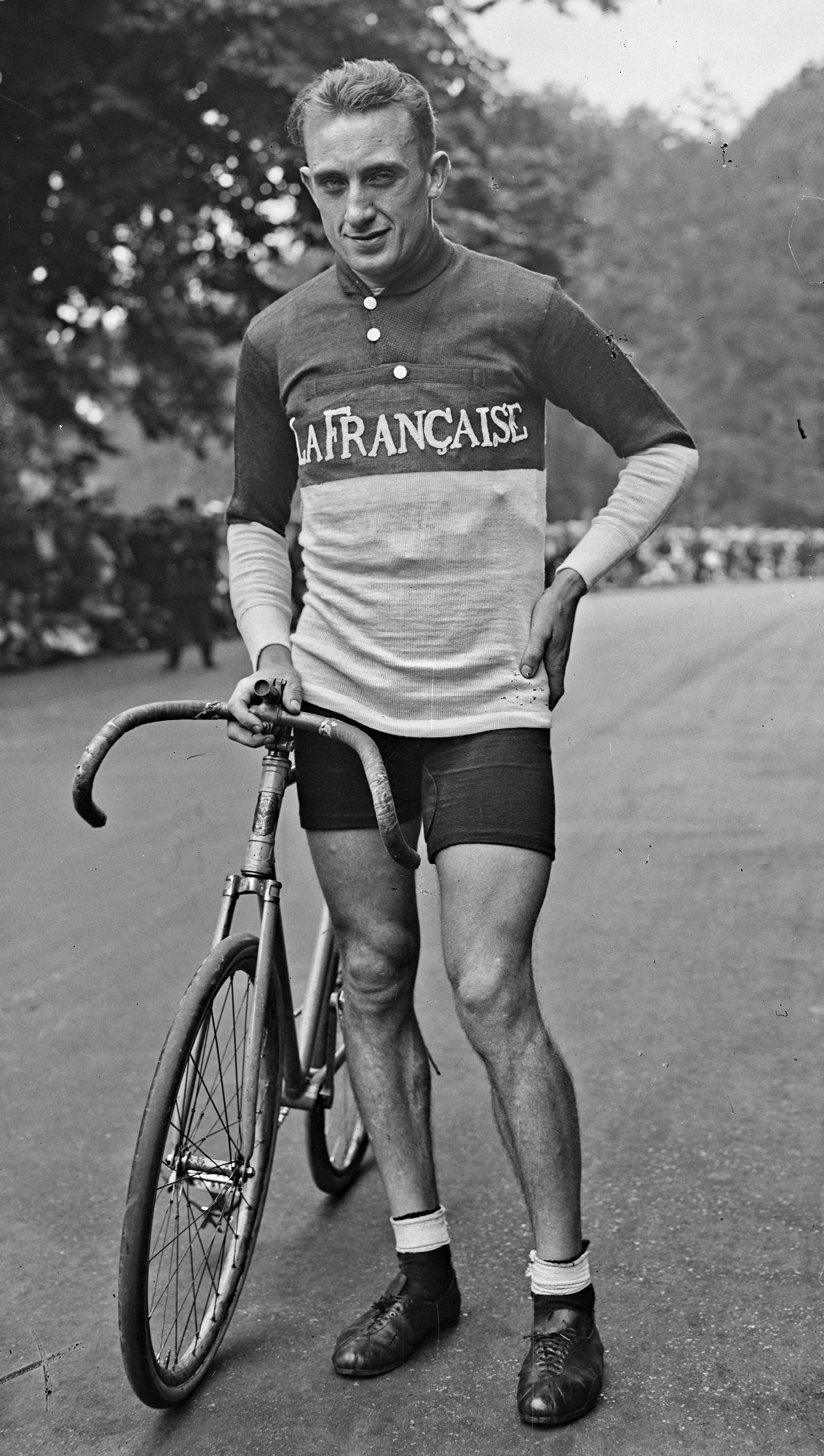
- Ronsse in 1930

Personal information
- Full name: George Ronsse
- Born: 4 March 1906 Antwerp, Belgium
- Died: 4 July 1969 (aged 63) Berchem, Belgium

Cycling career
- Sport: Cycling
- Disciplines: Road, track and cyclo-cross
- Role: Rider

Professional teams
- 1926–1929: Automoto
- 1930–1933: La Française

Major wins
- Grand Tours Tour de France 1 individual stage (1932) One-day races and Classics World Road Race Championships (1928, 1929) Paris–Roubaix (1927) Liège–Bastogne–Liège (1925) Scheldeprijs (1927) Paris–Brussels (1928) Bordeaux–Paris (1927, 1929, 1930) GP Wolber (1930) Cyclo-cross Belgian Championship (1929, 1930) Track cycling Belgian Championship Stayers (1934, 1935, 1936)
Medal record
Men's road bicycle racing
Representing Belgium
World Championships
Gold medal – first place	1928 Budapest	Elite Road Race
Gold medal – first place	1929 Zürich	Elite Road Race
Bronze medal – third place	1930 Liège	Elite Road Race
Men's track cycling
World Championships
Bronze medal – third place	1935 Brussels	Motor-paced
Bronze medal – third place	1936 Zürich	Motor-paced

Georges Ronsse (4 March 1906 – 4 July 1969) was a two-time national cyclo-cross and two-time world champion road bicycle racer from Belgium, who raced between 1926 and 1938.

In addition to his several national and world championship titles, Ronsse won several of the classic races in road cycling including the 1925 Liège–Bastogne–Liège, the 1927 Paris–Roubaix, and the 1927, 1929 and 1930 editions of the now-defunct Bordeaux–Paris. He won his first world championship title in 1928 in Budapest with a lead of 19 minutes and 43 seconds over second-placed finisher Herbert Nebe, the largest winning margin in road world championship history.

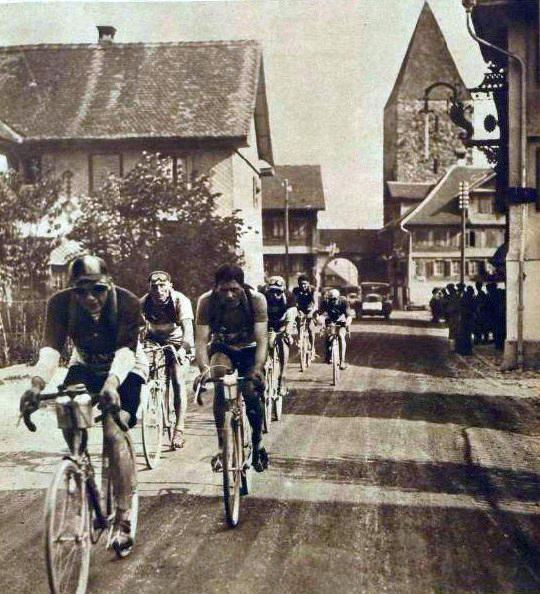
Ronsse, followed by Alfredo Binda and Nicolas Frantz during the 1929 world championship in Zürich.

In 1932, Ronsse capped off his career with a Stage 4 win at the 1932 Tour de France. After retiring from competition, he served as manager of the Belgian national team at the Tour.

== Major results ==
=== Road race ===
1925
1st Liège–Bastogne–Liège
1st Schaal Sels
6th Overall Tour of Belgium Independents

1st Stage 6

1926
3rd Championship of Flanders
3rd Omloop der Leiestreek
1927
1st Paris–Roubaix
1st Bordeaux–Paris
1st Scheldeprijs
1st Circuit of North-Belgium
3rd Paris–Tours
6th Overall Tour of the Basque Country
9th Tour of Flanders
1928
1st Road race, UCI World Championships
1st Paris–Brussels
1st Rupelmonde
2nd Paris–Roubaix
3rd Circuit de Paris (fr)
1929
1st Road race, UCI World Championships
1st Bordeaux–Paris
2nd Belgian National Road Race Championships
2nd Tour of Flanders
2nd Paris–Roubaix
3rd Paris–Tours
1930
1st Bordeaux–Paris
1st Nationale Sluitingsprijs
1st GP Wolber
1st Antwerp–Brussels–Antwerp
2nd Circuit du Midi
3rd Road race, UCI World Championships
6th Paris–Tours
6th Paris–Roubaix
1931
2nd Circuit de Paris (fr)
3rd Paris–Lille (fr)
3rd GP Wolber
4th Paris–Roubaix
1932
Tour de France

Winner stage 4
5th place overall classification

2nd Paris–Roubaix
3rd Paris–Brussels
1933
1st GP Stad Antwerpen
3rd Overall Tour of Belgium

1st Stage 1 & 4

=== Cyclo cross ===
1927
2nd National Championships
1928
2nd National Championships
2nd Critérium International de Cyclo-cross (fr)
1929
1st National Championships
1930
1st National Championships
2nd Critérium International de Cyclo-cross (fr)
1931
3rd Critérium International de Cyclo-cross (fr)
1933
1st Cyclo-cross championship of Antwerp

=== Track Cycling ===
1934
1st Motor-paced Belgian National Track Championships (fr)
1935
1st Motor-paced Belgian National Track Championships (fr)
3rd Motor-paced, UCI Track World Championships, Brussels
1936
1st Motor-paced Belgian National Track Championships (fr)
3rd Motor-paced, UCI Track World Championships, Zürich
3rd Six Days of Antwerp (with Adolf Schön)
1937
3rd Motor-paced Belgian National Track Championships (fr)
3rd Six Days of Antwerp (with Maurice Depauw)
1938
2nd Motor-paced Belgian National Track Championships (fr)
