= 1930 UCI Road World Championships – Men's road race =

Men's Individual Road Race
1930 UCI Road World Championships
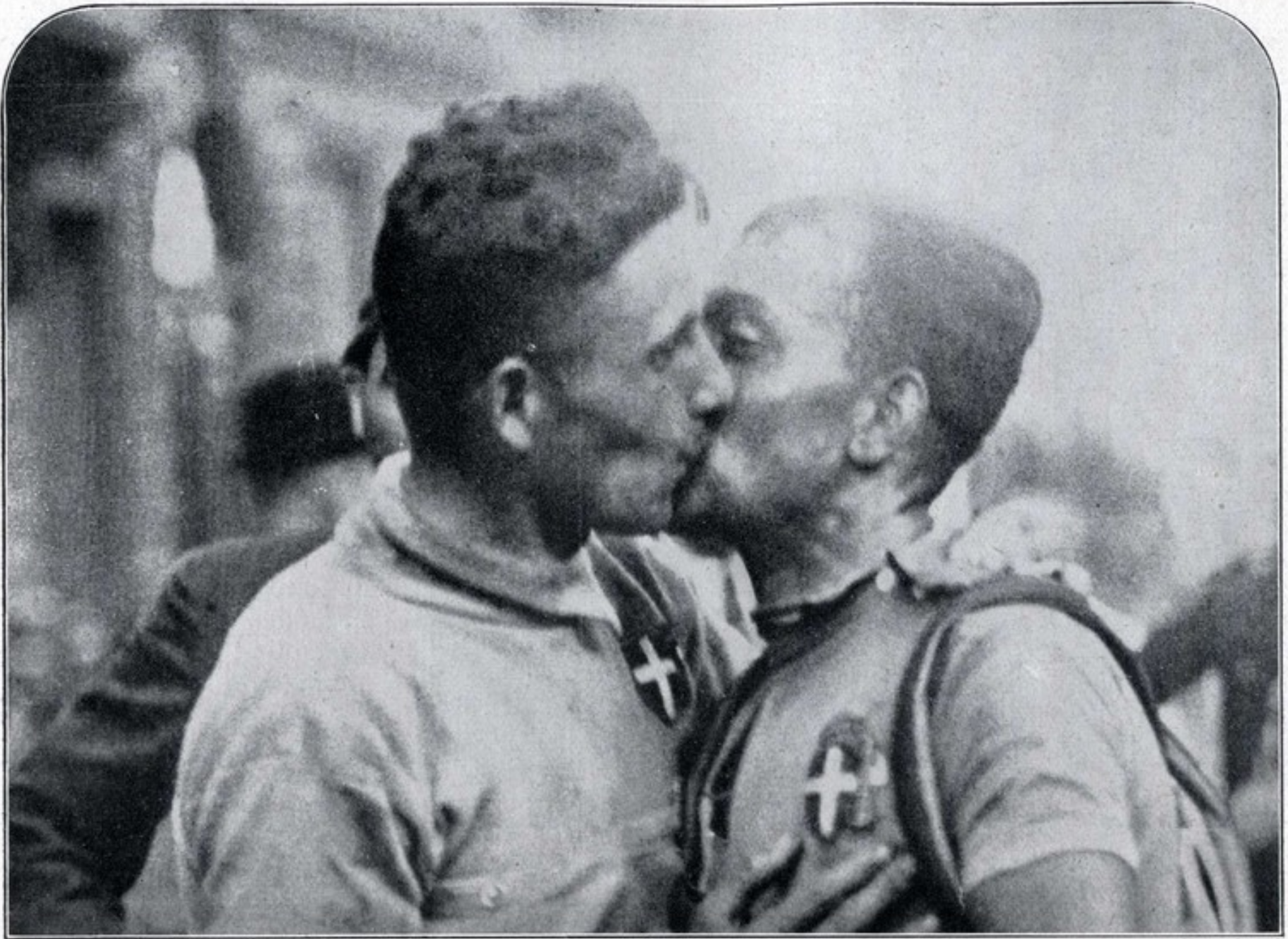
- Alfredo Binda and Allegro Grandi kiss at the 1930 World Road Cycling Championships

Race details
- Dates: 30 August 1930
- Stages: 1
- Distance: 210 km (130 mi)
- Winning time: 7h 30' 45"

Results
	Winner	Alfredo Binda (ITA)	(Italy)
	Second	Learco Guerra (ITA)	(Italy)
	Third	Georges Ronsse (BEL)	(Belgium)

The men's road race at the 1930 UCI Road World Championships was the fourth edition of the event. The race took place on Saturday 30 August 1930 in Liège, Belgium. The race was won by Alfredo Binda of Italy.

== Race report ==
The professional road race was decided in a sprint. Alfredo Binda won ahead of compatriot Learco Guerra and the defending champion, Belgian Georges Ronsse. Binda thus revenged for his defeat against Ronsse in the previous world championship. It was also his second world title.

== Final classification ==
General classification (1–10)

Rank	Rider	Time
1st place, gold medalist(s)	Alfredo Binda (ITA)	7h 30' 45"
2nd place, silver medalist(s)	Learco Guerra (ITA)	+ 0"
3rd place, bronze medalist(s)	Georges Ronsse (BEL)	+ 0"
4	Kurt Stöpel (GER)	+ 1"
5	Allegro Grandi (ITA)	+ 5"
6	Ricardo Montero (ESP)	+ 25"
7	Mariano Cañardo (ESP)	+ 1' 21"
8	Alfred Haemerlinck (BEL)	+ 1' 25"
9	Charles Pélissier (FRA)	+ 1' 45"
10	Max Bulla (AUT)	+ 2' 35"
