= 1927 Paris–Roubaix =

Cycling race

Race details
- Dates: 17 April 1927
- Stages: 1
- Distance: 270 km (167.8 mi)
- Winning time: 8h 32' 20"

Results
	Winner	Georges Ronsse (BEL)
	Second	Joseph Curtel (FRA)
	Third	Charles Pélissier (FRA)

The 1927 Paris–Roubaix was the 28th edition of the Paris–Roubaix, a classic one-day cycle race in France. The single day event was held on 17 April 1927 and stretched 270 km (168 mi) from Paris to its end in a velodrome in Roubaix. The winner was Georges Ronsse from Belgium.

== Results ==
Final results (1–10)
Rank	Cyclist	Time
1	Georges Ronsse (BEL)	8h 32' 20″
2	Joseph Curtel (FRA)	+0' 00″
3	Charles Pélissier (FRA)	+0' 00″
4	Julien Delbecque (BEL)	+0' 00″
5	Adelin Benoit (BEL)	+0' 00″
6	Romain Bellenger (FRA)	+0' 00″
7	René Hamel (FRA)	+0' 00″
8	André Verbist (BEL)	+0' 00″
9	Léopold-Albert Matton (FRA)	+0' 00″
10	Alex Maes (BEL)	+0' 00″
