= Textielprijs Vichte =

Belgian cycling race

Race details
- Date: September
- Region: Vichte, West Flanders (Belgium)
- English name: Textile Prize Vichte
- Discipline: Road
- Competition: Criterium
- Type: One-day race
- Web site: www.textielprijsvichte.be

History
- First edition: 1928
- Editions: 91
- First winner: Alfred Hamerlinck (BEL)
- Most wins: Alfred Hamerlinck (BEL); (6 wins)
- Most recent: Max Kroonen (NED)

The Textielprijs Vichte is a Belgian cycling race that was organized for the first time in 1928.

With Vichte as both start and finish place, the course is situated in the region of West-Flanders.

The competition's roll of honor includes the successes of Marcel Kint, Rik Van Looy, Walter Godefroot and Iljo Keisse. The record of victories, however, belongs to Alfred Hamerlinck.

== Winners ==
Year	Country	Rider	Team
1928	Belgium	Alfred Hamerlinck	Automoto
1929	Belgium	André Mortier	
1930	Belgium	Jean Debusschere	La Nordiste-Wolber
1931	Belgium	Alfred Hamerlinck	Dilecta
1932	Belgium	Alfred Hamerlinck	Dilecta
1933	Belgium	Alfred Hamerlinck	Dilecta
1934	Belgium	Alfred Hamerlinck	Dilecta
1935	Belgium	Alfred Hamerlinck	Dilecta
1936	Belgium	Emile Vandepitte	
1937	Belgium	Jérôme Dufromont	
1938	Belgium	Georges Christiaens	
1939-1941	No race due to World War II		
1942	Belgium	André Defoort	Génial Lucifer
1943-1944	No race due to World War II		
1945	Belgium	Albert Sercu	Dilecta-Wolber
1946	Belgium	Marcel Kint	Mercier–Hutchinson
1947	Belgium	Maurice Van Herzele	Rochet-Dunlop
1948	Belgium	Lucien Mathys	Groene Leeuw
1949	Belgium	Albert Decin	Alcyon-Dunlop
1950	Belgium	André Declerck	Bertin-Wolber
1951	Belgium	René Oreel	Terrot-Wolber
1952	Belgium	Henri Denijs	Alcyon-Dunlop
1953	Belgium	Roger Desmet	Groene Leeuw
1954	Belgium	André Noyelle	Alcyon-Dunlop
1955	Belgium	Gilbert Desmet	Groene Leeuw
1956	Belgium	Jean Adriaensens	Mercier–Hutchinson
1957	Belgium	Armand Desmet	Groene Leeuw
1958	Belgium	Roger De Clercq	Plume–Vainqueur
1959	Belgium	Maurice Meuleman	Elvé-Peugeot-Marvan
1960	Belgium	Jef Planckaert	Flandria-Wiel's
1961	Belgium	Marcel Ongenae	Flandria-Wiel's
1962	Belgium	Rik Van Looy	Flandria-Faema
1963	Belgium	Theo Mertens	G.B.C.–Libertas
1964	Belgium	Rik Van Looy	Solo–Superia
1965	Belgium	Armand Desmet	Faema-Flandria
1966	Belgium	Eric De Munster	Wiel's–Gancia-Groene Leeuw
1967	Belgium	Georges Smissaert	Flandria–De Clerck
1968	Belgium	Etienne Buysse	Tibetan–Pull Over Centrale
1969	Belgium	Wilfried David	Flandria–De Clerck–Krüger
1970	Belgium	Eric De Munster	Geens–Watneys
1971	Belgium	Walter Godefroot	Peugeot–BP–Michelin
1972	Belgium	Willy Van Malderghem	Watney–Avia
1973	Belgium	Arthur Van De Vijver	Flandria–Carpenter–Shimano
1974	Belgium	Fernand Hermie	IJsboerke–Colner
1975	Belgium	Marc Demeyer	Flandria–Carpenter
1976	Belgium	Eddy Cael	Flandria–Velda–West Vlaams Vleesbedrijf
1977	Belgium	Arthur Van De Vijver	Flandria–Velda–Latina Assicurazioni
1978	Belgium	Michel Pollentier	Flandria–Velda–Lano
1979	Belgium	Marc Demeyer	Flandria–Velda–Lano
1980	Belgium	Romain Steel	Fangio–Amerlinckx–Campagnolo
1981	Belgium	Ludo Schurgens	Masta–Peeters–B.b.s.
1982	Belgium	Dirk Heirweg	Van de Ven Olen–Moser
1983	Belgium	Dirk Baert	Lusterie Mark
1984	Belgium	Martin Durant	Fangio–Marc–Ecoturbo–Mavic
1985	Belgium	Luc De Smet	TeVe Blad–Perlav
1986	Belgium	Marc Van Geel	Safir–Van de Ven
1987	Belgium	Ludo Giesberts	TeVe Blad–Eddy Merckx
1988	Belgium	Philippe Van Vooren	ADR–Anti-M–Bottecchia
1989	Netherlands	Frank Pirard	Histor–Sigma
1990	Belgium	Patrick Hendrickx	Isoglass–Garden Wood
1991	Netherlands	Michel Cornelisse	La William–Saltos
1992	Belgium	Danny Daelman	Buckler
1993	Belgium	Hans De Meester	Willy Naessens
1994	Belgium	Carlo Bomans	GB–MG Maglificio
1995	Belgium	Johan Capiot	Refin–Cantina Tollo
1996	Belgium	Hans De Meester	Palmans
1997	Belgium	Gert Vanderaerden	Palmans–Boghemans
1998	Belgium	Davy Delme	Tönissteiner–Colnago
1999	Belgium	Bart Herrewegh	Ipso–Euroclean
2000	Belgium	Andy De Smet	Spar–OKI
2001	United Kingdom	Roger Hammond	Collstrop–Palmans
2002	Belgium	Kristof Trouvé	Palmans–Collstrop
2003	Lithuania	Darius Strole	Palmans–Collstrop
2004	Belgium	Bart Vanheule	Bodysol–Win for Life–Jong Vlaanderen
2005	Netherlands	Rik Reinerink	Chocolade Jacques–T-Interim
2006	Belgium	Wouter Weylandt	Quick-Step–Innergetic
2007	Belgium	Iljo Keisse	Chocolade Jacques–Topsport Vlaanderen
2008	Belgium	Iljo Keisse	Topsport Vlaanderen
2009	Belgium	Kevin Claeys	Individual
2010	Belgium	Frédéric Amorison	Landbouwkrediet
2011	Belgium	Jurgen François	Colba–Mercury
2012	Belgium	Jens Keukeleire	Orica–GreenEDGE
2013	Netherlands	Brian van Goethem	Metec–TKH Continental Cyclingteam
2014	Belgium	Jens Debusschere	Lotto–Belisol
2015	Belgium	Tosh Van der Sande	Lotto–Soudal
2016	Belgium	Julien Vermote	Etixx–Quick-Step
2017	Belgium	Iljo Keisse	Quick-Step Floors
2018	France	Florian Sénéchal	Quick-Step Floors
2019	Germany	Jannik Steimle	Deceuninck–Quick-Step
2020	No race due to COVID-19 pandemic		
2021	Netherlands	Coen Vermeltfoort	VolkerWessels Cycling Team
2022	Belgium	Dries De Bondt	Alpecin–Fenix
2023	Belgium	Dries De Bondt	Alpecin–Deceuninck
2024	Netherlands	Max Kroonen	VolkerWessels Cycling Team
