= 2010 UCI Road World Championships – Men's time trial =

Men's time trial
2010 UCI Road World Championships
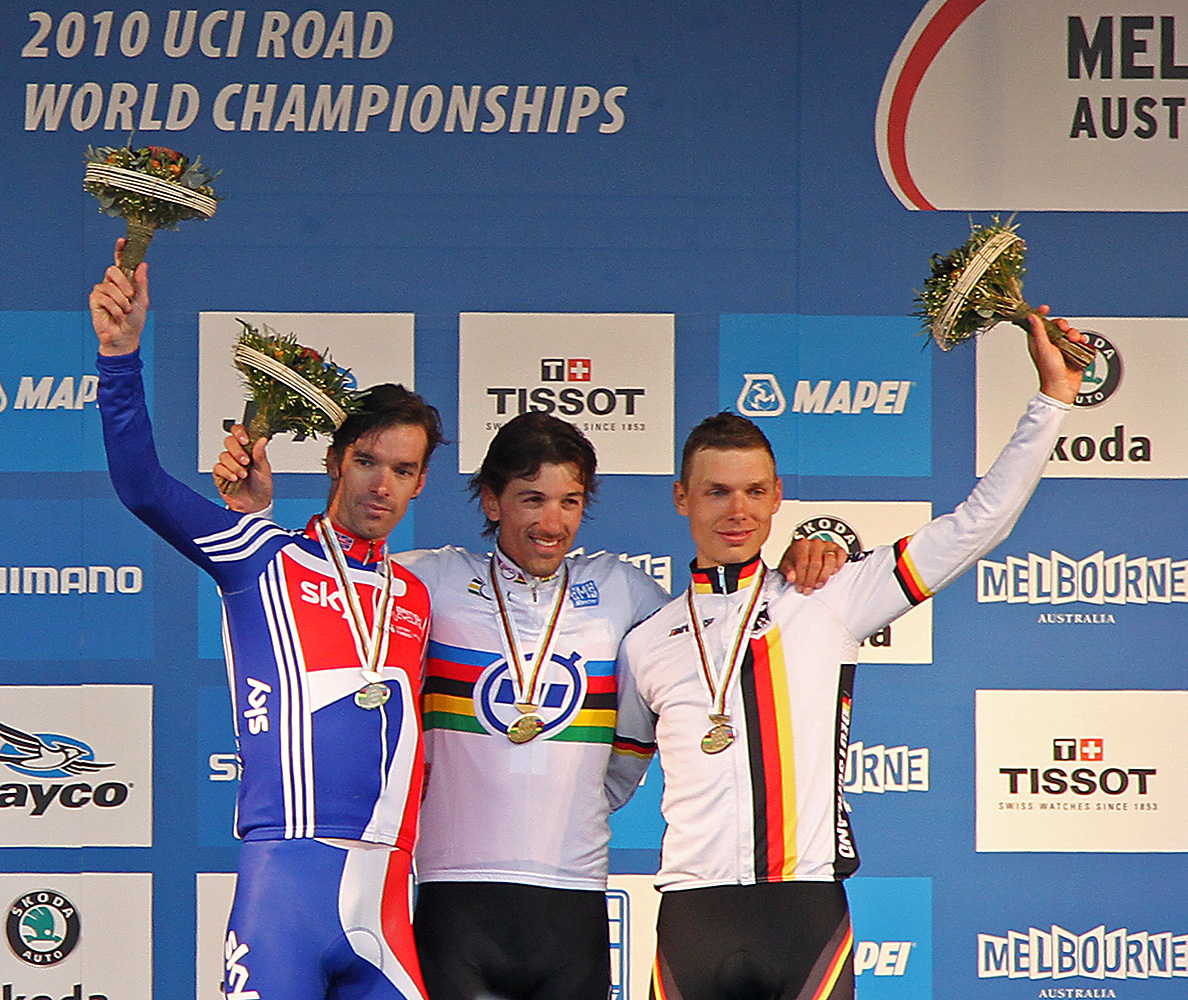
- Medallists: David Millar, Fabian Cancellara, & Tony Martin

Race details
- Dates: September 30, 2010
- Stages: 1
- Distance: 45.6 km (28.33 mi)
- Winning time: 58' 09.19"

Medalists
	Gold	Fabian Cancellara (Switzerland)
	Silver	David Millar (Great Britain)
	Bronze	Tony Martin (Germany)

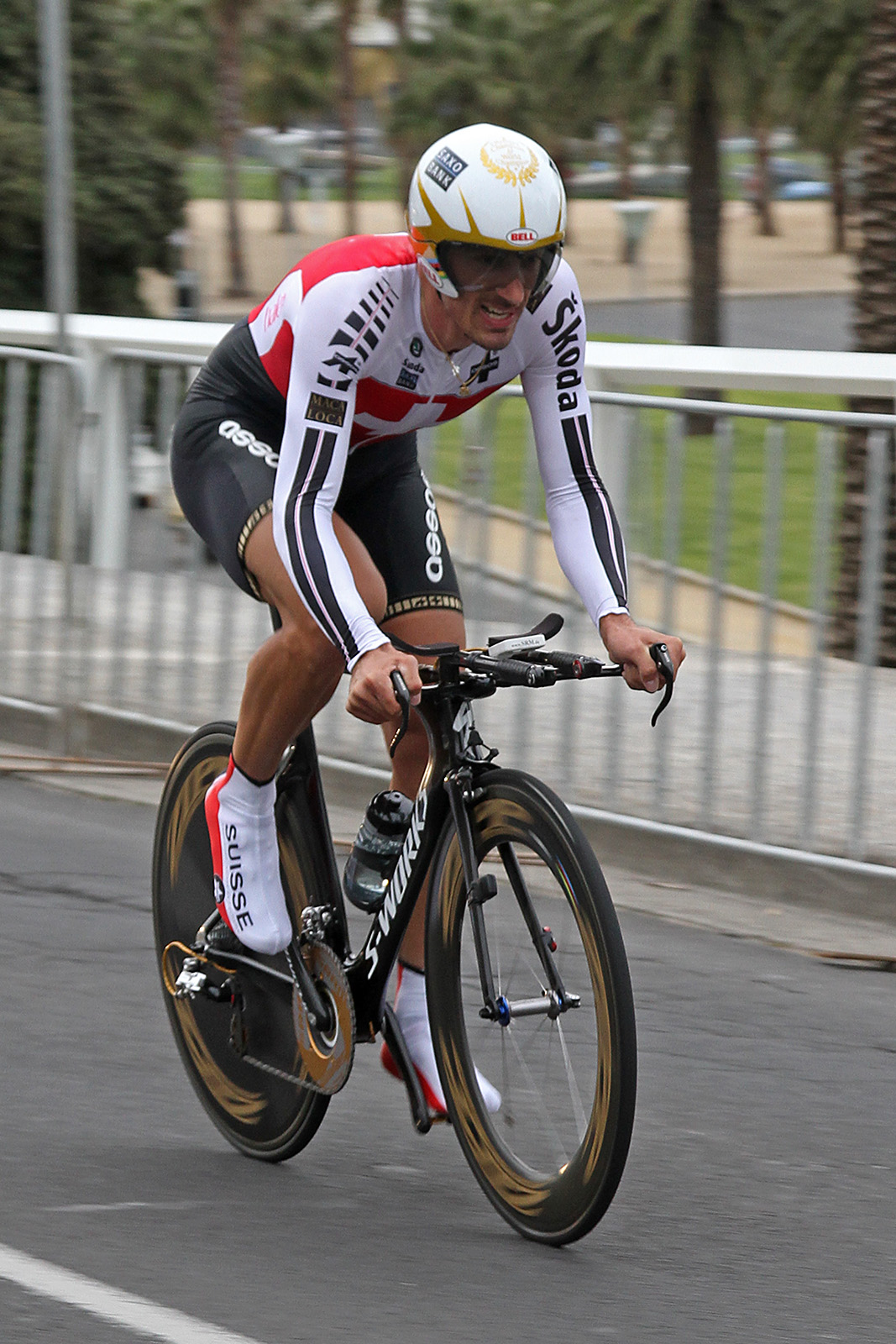
Fabian Cancellara minutes before claiming a record fourth world title in the time trial race

The Men's time trial of the 2010 UCI Road World Championships cycling event took place on 30 September in Melbourne (Geelong), Australia, the first time in the event's 77 times that it has been held in Australia.

Fabian Cancellara defended his title, and in doing so, clinched a record fourth time trial world championship, recording a time more than a minute faster than any of his rivals. Great Britain's David Millar took silver, with Germany's Tony Martin claiming bronze. The two Australian entrants, Richie Porte and Michael Rogers, came in fourth and fifth respectively in their home country.

== Route ==
The riders completed two laps on an up-and-downhill 22.7 km course for a total length of 45.6 km.

== Final classification ==
Rank	Rider	Nation	Time
1	Fabian Cancellara	Switzerland	58' 09.19"
2	David Millar	Great Britain	+ 1' 02.75"
3	Tony Martin	Germany	+ 1' 12.49"
4	Richie Porte	Australia	+ 1' 19.00"
5	Michael Rogers	Australia	+ 2' 24.94"
6	Koos Moerenhout	Netherlands	+ 2' 40.69"
7	Luis León Sánchez	Spain	+ 2' 44.23"
8	David Zabriskie	United States	+ 2' 51.41"
9	Maciej Bodnar	Poland	+ 3' 00.70"
10	Gustav Larsson	Sweden	+ 3' 01.02"
11	Bert Grabsch	Germany	+ 3' 06.14"
12	Ignatas Konovalovas	Lithuania	+ 3' 07.46"
13	Vladimir Gusev	Russia	+ 3' 27.28"
14	Carlos Oyarzún	Chile	+ 3' 30.54"
15	Nicolas Vogondy	France	+ 3' 38.85"
16	Andriy Hryvko	Ukraine	+ 3' 40.70"
17	Iván Gutiérrez	Spain	+ 3' 42.56"
18	Alex Rasmussen	Denmark	+ 3' 45.07"
19	Sylvain Chavanel	France	+ 3' 59.84"
20	Janez Brajkovič	Slovenia	+ 4' 03.97"
21	Artem Ovechkin	Russia	+ 4' 06.89"
22	Dmitry Fofonov	Kazakhstan	+ 4' 11.23"
23	Jack Bauer	New Zealand	+ 4' 17.78"
24	Tejay van Garderen	United States	+ 4' 40.89"
25	David McCann	Ireland	+ 4' 52.60"
26	Svein Tuft	Canada	+ 4' 55.15"
27	Martin Velits	Slovakia	+ 5' 00.00"
28	Raivis Belohvoščiks	Latvia	+ 5' 15.15"
29	Matías Médici	Argentina	+ 5' 17.55"
30	Kanstantsin Sivtsov	Belarus	+ 5' 23.48"
31	Michael Mørkøv	Denmark	+ 5' 24.76"
32	Peter Velits	Slovakia	+ 5' 26.34"
33	Tanel Kangert	Estonia	+ 5' 30.12"
34	Andrey Zeits	Kazakhstan	+ 5' 33.64"
35	Dominique Cornu	Belgium	+ 5' 35.83"
36	Jos van Emden	Netherlands	+ 5' 47.55"
37	Gordon McCauley	New Zealand	+ 6' 55.96"
38	Jay Robert Thomson	South Africa	+ 6' 59.38"
39	Jarosław Marycz	Poland	+ 7' 24.34"
40	Esad Hasanović	Serbia	+ 9' 02.58"
41	Reginald Douglas	Saint Kitts and Nevis	+ 23' 08.48"
42	James Weekes	Saint Kitts and Nevis	+ 23' 49.61"
	José Serpa	Colombia	DNS
