= Oskar Svendsen =

Norwegian cyclist

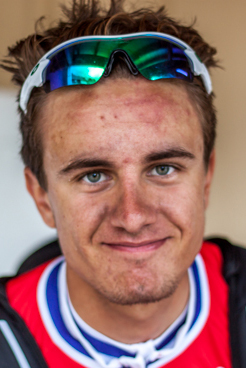

Personal information
- Full name: Oskar Nikolai Birger Svendsen
- Born: 10 April 1994 (age 32) Lillehammer, Norway

Cycling career
- Sport: Cycling
- Discipline: Road
- Role: Rider
- Rider type: Time trialist

Professional team
- 2013–2014: Team Joker

Oskar Nikolai Birger Svendsen (born 10 April 1994 in Lillehammer) is a former Norwegian cyclist.

Svendsen has one of the highest recorded VO2max (maximum amount of oxygen uptake) with 97.5 milliliter per kilogram per minute, set at the university in Lillehammer before the 2012 Junior World Time Trial Championships.

== Major results ==
2012
1st Time trial, UCI Junior Road World Championships
National Junior Road Championships

1st Time trial
2nd Road race

9th Course de la Paix Juniors
2013
1st Stage 3 (TTT) Circuit des Ardennes
5th Overall Tour de l'Avenir
2014
4th Time trial, National Road Championships
