= 2012 UCI Road World Championships =

Cycling world championships

- Venue: Valkenburg, the Netherlands
- Date: September 15–23, 2012
- Coordinates: 50°52′N 5°50′E
- Nations participating: 74
- Events: 12

The 2012 UCI Road World Championships took place in the southern part of the Dutch province of Limburg, also known as South Limburg, between September 15 and 23. The event consisted of a road race and a time trial for men, women and men under 23, and team time trials for elite men and women. It was the 79th Road World Championships. Castelfidardo near Loreto in Italy was also a candidate, but Italy had held the UCI Road World Championships in Varese in 2008. The Netherlands had last hosted the Road World Championships in 1998, in Valkenburg aan de Geul, and 2012 was the seventh time that the country hosted the championships.

The 2012 championships had a number of changes compared to the former editions. A team time trial was reintroduced. This was last competed as a world championship event in 1994 between nations. The reintroduction will see trade teams compete, similar to the Eindhoven Team Time Trial held between 2005 and 2007. The Junior championships will also be on the programme. With the extra events, the championships will be held over two weekends (nine days) and will also include an opening ceremony and a cyclosportive event.

The start and finish for the events was in Vilt, a commune of Valkenburg aan de Geul on top of the Cauberg.

== Schedule ==
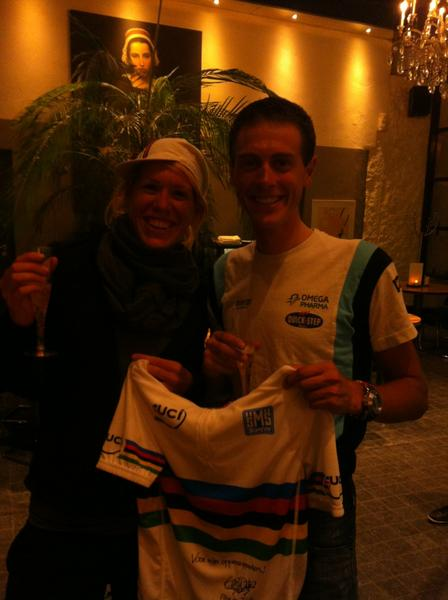
Ellen van Dijk and Niki Terpstra celebrating their World Team Time Trial title

Date	Timings		Event	Distance	Start	Finish
Team time trial events
September 16	11:00	12:30	Women's teams	34.2 km (21.3 mi)	Sittard-Geleen	Valkenburg aan de Geul
September 16	13:30	16:40	Men's teams	53.2 km (33.1 mi)	Sittard-Geleen	Valkenburg aan de Geul
Individual time trial events
September 17	10:00	12:05	Junior men	26.6 km (16.5 mi)	Landgraaf	Valkenburg aan de Geul
September 17	14:00	16:25	Under-23 men	36.0 km (22.4 mi)	Landgraaf	Valkenburg aan de Geul
September 18	10:30	12:22	Junior women	15.6 km (9.7 mi)	Eijsden-Margraten	Valkenburg aan de Geul
September 18	14:00	16:25	Elite women	24.3 km (15.1 mi)	Eijsden-Margraten	Valkenburg aan de Geul
September 18	13:30	16:40	Elite men	45.7 km (28.4 mi)	Heerlen	Valkenburg aan de Geul

September 21

- 14:00–16:10 – Road race – Junior Women, 80 km, 5 x Circuit (5 x 16.125 km)

September 22

- 09:00–13:15 – Road race – Under 23 Men, 177 km, 11 x Circuit (11 x 16.125 km)
- 14:30–17:45 – Road race – Elite Women, 129 km, 8 x Circuit (8 x 16.125 km)

September 23

- 09:00–12:10 – Road race – Junior Men, 129 km, 8 x Circuit (8 x 16.125 km)
- 10:45–17:00 – Road race – Elite Men, 267 km, Start in Maastricht, then, after 106 km through the southern part of the province of Limburg, 10 x Circuit (10 x 16.125 km)

Circuit = west on Rijksweg in Vilt, continuing through Berg en Terblijt onto Bergerstraat, turning left grazing Maastricht on the east by going south on Molenweg, then turning left and continuing east on Bemelerweg, continuing onto Oude Akerstraat and Bemelerberg through Bemelen, continuing onto Gasthuis, turning left and continuing northeast On Smitserweg, which turns into Bemelerweg grazing Sibbe on the west and into Daalhemerweg curving to north all the way into Valkenburg aan de Geul, at the end turning left onto Cauberg, back to Vilt.

== Participating nations ==
Cyclists from 74 national federations participated. The number of cyclists per nation that competed, excluding riders in the team time trials, is shown in parentheses.

Participating national federations
Click on a nation to go to the nations' UCI Road World Championships page
- Algeria
- Andorra (1)
- Argentina
- Australia
- Austria
- Azerbaijan (2)
- Belarus
- Belgium
- Bolivia (1)
- Brazil
- Bulgaria (1)
- Canada
- Chile
- Colombia
- Costa Rica (1)
- Croatia
- Czech Republic
- Denmark
- Dominican Republic
- Ecuador
- Eritrea (1)
- Estonia
- Ethiopia
- Finland
- France
- Germany (34)
- Great Britain
- Greece
- Guam (1)
- Hong Kong
- Hungary
- Ireland
- Israel
- Italy
- Ivory Coast (1)
- Japan
- Kazakhstan
- Kyrgyzstan (1)
- Latvia
- Lebanon
- Lithuania
- Luxembourg
- North Macedonia (1)
- Malaysia
- Mexico
- Moldova
- Monaco
- Morocco
- Namibia (1)
- Netherlands (39) (host)
- Netherlands Antilles
- New Zealand
- Norway
- Panama (1)
- Poland
- Portugal
- Russia
- Saint Kitts and Nevis (1)
- San Marino
- Serbia
- Slovakia
- Slovenia
- South Africa
- South Korea (1)
- Spain
- Sweden
- Switzerland
- Thailand (1)
- Tunisia
- Turkey
- Ukraine
- United States
- Uruguay (1)
- Venezuela

== Events summary ==
Event	Gold		Silver		Bronze	
Men's events
Men's road race	(Belgium) Philippe Gilbert (BEL)	6h 10' 41"	(Norway) Edvald Boasson Hagen (NOR)	+ 4"	(Spain) Alejandro Valverde (ESP)	+ 5"
Men's time trial	(Germany) Tony Martin (GER)	58' 38.76"	(United States) Taylor Phinney (USA)	+ 5.37"	(Belarus) Vasil Kiryienka (BLR)	+ 1' 44.99"
Men's team time trial	(Belgium) Omega Pharma–Quick-Step	1h 03' 17.17"	(United States) BMC Racing Team	+ 3.23"	(Australia) Orica–GreenEDGE	+ 47.06"
Men's team time trial	(Belgium) Tom Boonen (BEL) (France) Sylvain Chavanel (FRA) (Germany) Tony Martin (GER) (Netherlands) Niki Terpstra (NED) (Belgium) Kristof Vandewalle (BEL) (Slovakia) Peter Velits (SVK)	1h 03' 17.17"	(Italy) Alessandro Ballan (ITA) (Belgium) Philippe Gilbert (BEL) (United States) Taylor Phinney (USA) (Italy) Marco Pinotti (ITA) (Italy) Manuel Quinziato (ITA) (United States) Tejay van Garderen (USA)	+ 3.23"	(New Zealand) Sam Bewley (NZL) (Australia) Luke Durbridge (AUS) (Netherlands) Sebastian Langeveld (NED) (Australia) Cameron Meyer (AUS) (Netherlands) Jens Mouris (NED) (Canada) Svein Tuft (CAN)	+ 47.06"
Women's events
Women's road race	(Netherlands) Marianne Vos (NED)	3h 14' 29"	(Australia) Rachel Neylan (AUS)	+ 10"	(Italy) Elisa Longo Borghini (ITA)	+ 18"
Women's time trial	(Germany) Judith Arndt (GER)	32' 26.46"	(United States) Evelyn Stevens (USA)	+ 33.77"	(New Zealand) Linda Villumsen (NZL)	+ 40.57"
Women's team time trial	(Germany) Team Specialized–lululemon	46' 31.63"	(Australia) Orica–AIS	+ 24.19"	(Netherlands) AA Drink–leontien.nl	+ 1' 59.32"
Women's team time trial	(Germany) Charlotte Becker (GER) (Netherlands) Ellen van Dijk (NED) (United States) Amber Neben (USA) (United States) Evelyn Stevens (USA) (Germany) Ina-Yoko Teutenberg (GER) (Germany) Trixi Worrack (GER)	46' 31.63"	(Germany) Judith Arndt (GER) (Australia) Shara Gillow (AUS) (Netherlands) Loes Gunnewijk (NED) (Australia) Melissa Hoskins (AUS) (Australia) Alex Rhodes (AUS) (New Zealand) Linda Villumsen (NZL)	+ 24.19"	(Netherlands) Chantal Blaak (NED) (Netherlands) Lucinda Brand (NED) (Belgium) Jessie Daams (BEL) (United Kingdom) Sharon Laws (GBR) (United Kingdom) Emma Pooley (GBR) (Netherlands) Kirsten Wild (NED)	+ 1' 59.32"
Men's Under-23 Events
Men's under-23 road race	(Kazakhstan) Alexey Lutsenko (KAZ)	4h 20' 15"	(France) Bryan Coquard (FRA)	s.t.	(Belgium) Tom Van Asbroeck (BEL)	s.t.
Men's under-23 time trial	(Russia) Anton Vorobyev (RUS)	44' 09.02"	(Australia) Rohan Dennis (AUS)	+ 44.39"	(Australia) Damien Howson (AUS)	+ 51.12"
Men's Juniors Events
Men's junior road race	(Slovenia) Matej Mohorič (SLO)	3h 00' 45"	(Australia) Caleb Ewan (AUS)	s.t.	(Croatia) Josip Rumac (CRO)	s.t.
Men's junior time trial	(Norway) Oskar Svendsen (NOR)	35' 34.75"	(Slovenia) Matej Mohorič (SLO)	+ 7.04"	(Germany) Maximilian Schachmann (GER)	+ 11.83"
Women's Juniors Events
Women's junior road race	(United Kingdom) Lucy Garner (GBR)	2h 11' 26"	(Norway) Eline Brustad (NOR)	s.t.	(Italy) Anna Stricker (ITA)	s.t.
Women's junior time trial	(United Kingdom) Elinor Barker (GBR)	22' 26.29"	(Denmark) Cecilie Uttrup Ludwig (DEN)	+ 35.87"	(Netherlands) Demi de Jong (NED)	+ 1' 03.13"

== Medal table ==
Place	Nation	1st place, gold medalist(s)	2nd place, silver medalist(s)	3rd place, bronze medalist(s)	Total
1	Germany	3	0	1	4
2	Belgium	2	0	1	3
3	Great Britain	2	0	0	2
4	Norway	1	2	0	3
5	Slovenia	1	1	0	2
6	Netherlands	1	0	2	3
7	Kazakhstan	1	0	0	1
7	Russia	1	0	0	1
9	Australia	0	4	2	6
10	United States	0	3	0	3
11	Denmark	0	1	0	1
11	France	0	1	0	1
13	Italy	0	0	2	2
14	Belarus	0	0	1	1
14	Croatia	0	0	1	1
14	New Zealand	0	0	1	1
14	Spain	0	0	1	1
Total		12	12	12	36

Team time trials are included under the UCI registration country of the team.
