= 1929 Tour of Flanders =

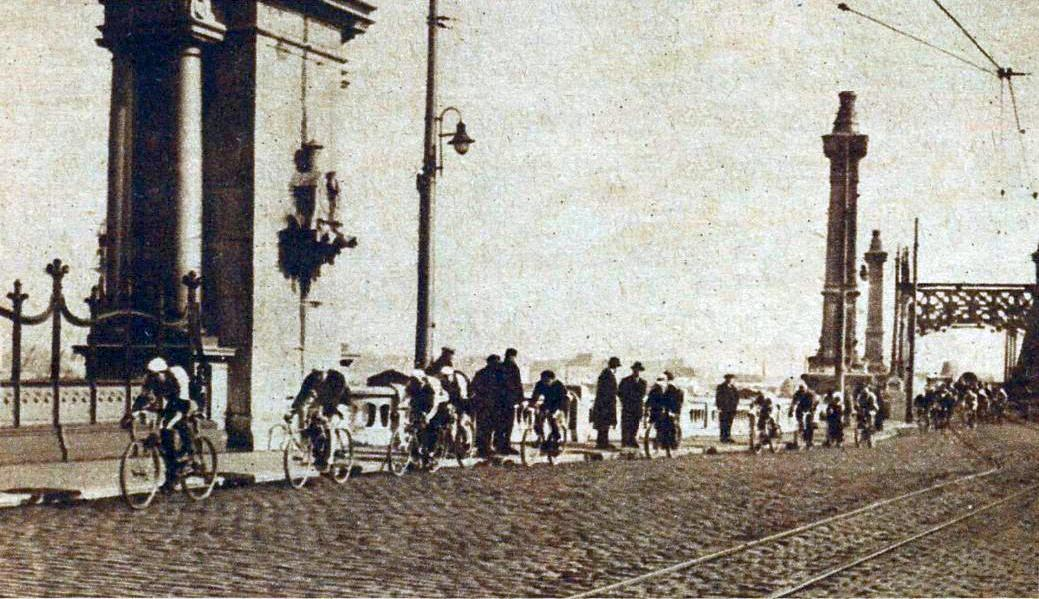
- De peloton of the 1929 Ronde van Vlaanderen, passing a bridge in Ostend

Race details
- Dates: March 17, 1929
- Stages: 1
- Distance: 216 km (134.2 mi)
- Winning time: 7h 01' 50"

Results
	Winner	Jef Dervaes (BEL)
	Second	Georges Ronsse (BEL)
	Third	Alfred Hamerlinck (BEL)

The 13th edition of the Tour of Flanders cycling classic race was held on Sunday, 17 March 1929. Belgian Jef Dervaes won the Monument. Of the 63 starting cyclists, 28 reached the finish.

== Route ==
The race started in Ghent and covered 216 km on the way to the finish in Wetteren.

The course featured 2 categorized climbs:

- Tiegemberg
- Kwaremont

== Race report ==
The final winner was Jef Dervaes arrived solo in Wetteren with a huge advantage. World champion Georges Ronsse finished second, while Alfred Hamerlinck took the third place. Dervaes completed the race with an average of 30.723 km/h.

== General classification ==
=== Final general classification ===
Rank	Rider	Team	Time
1	Jef Dervaes (BEL)	Genial Lucifer-Hutchinson	7h 01' 50"
2	Georges Ronsse (BEL)	La Française-Diamant-Dunlop	+ 4' 10"
3	Alfred Hamerlinck (BEL)	Genial Lucifer-Hutchinson	+ 5' 10"
4	Jean Mertens (BEL)	Alcyon-Dunlop	s.t.
5	Gustaaf Van Slembrouck (BEL)	Genial Lucifer-Hutchinson	s.t.
6	André Verbiest (BEL)	Individual	s.t.
7	August Verdyck (BEL)	Genial Lucifer-Hutchinson	s.t.
8	Julien Vervaecke (BEL)	Alcyon-Dunlop	s.t.
9	Ernest Mottard (BEL)	Genial Lucifer-Hutchinson	+ 10' 10"
10	Julien Delbecque (BEL)	Gouden Hand	+ 10' 40"
