= Joseph Curtel =

French cyclist

Personal information
- Born: 21 November 1893
- Died: 2 September 1960 (aged 66)

Cycling career
- Sport: Cycling
- Discipline: Road
- Role: Rider

Joseph Curtel (21 November 1893 – 2 September 1960) was a French racing cyclist. He rode in the 1923 Tour de France.
