= 1929 UCI Road World Championships – Men's road race =

Men's Individual Road Race
1929 UCI Road World Championships
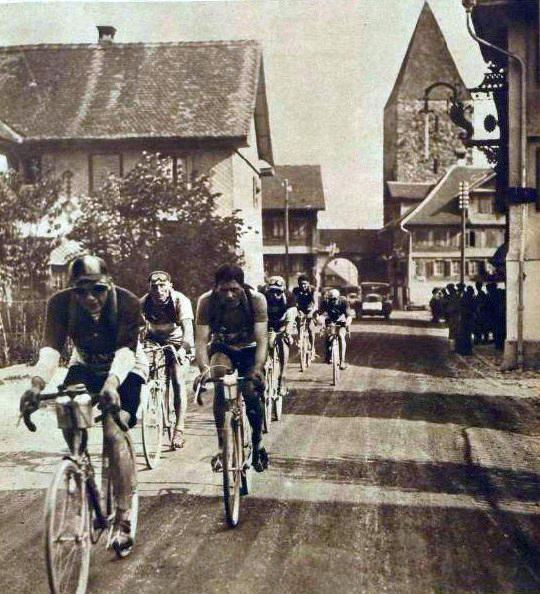
- Georges Ronsse during the race, followed by Alfredo Binda and Nicolas Frantz

Race details
- Dates: 16 August 1929
- Stages: 1
- Distance: 200 km (124.3 mi)
- Winning time: 6h 48' 05"

Results
	Winner	Georges Ronsse (BEL)	(Belgium)
	Second	Nicolas Frantz (LUX)	(Luxembourg)
	Third	Alfredo Binda (ITA)	(Italy)

The men's road race at the 1929 UCI Road World Championships was the third edition of the event. The race took place on Friday 16 August 1929 in Zürich, Switzerland. The race was won by Georges Ronsse of Belgium.

== Race report ==
Among both professional and amateur cyclists, the race was decided in the sprint. In the professional cyclists, Georges Ronsse, who successfully defended his world title, won ahead of Luxembourger Nicolas Frantz and Italian former champion Alfredo Binda. Jef Dervaes was fourth. Swiss hope Heiri Suter suffered a puncture in the final part of the race and, despite help from his compatriots Ernst Hofer and Albert Meier, was unable to catch up with the leading group and finished 12th, more than 10 minutes behind the winner.

== Final classification ==
General classification (1–10)

Rank	Rider	Time
1st place, gold medalist(s)	Georges Ronsse (BEL)	6h 48' 05"
2nd place, silver medalist(s)	Nicolas Frantz (LUX)	+ 0"
3rd place, bronze medalist(s)	Alfredo Binda (ITA)	+ 0"
4	Joseph Dervaes (BEL)	+ 1"
5	Leonida Frascarelli (ITA)	+ 1"
6	Marcel Bidot (FRA)	+ 1' 00"
7	Ferdinand Le Drogo (FRA)	+ 1' 00"
8	Max Bulla (AUT)	+ 3' 19"
9	Domenico Piemontesi (ITA)	+ 4' 58"
10	Jean Bidot (FRA)	+ 4' 58"
