= 2008 UCI Road World Championships =

Cycling world championships

- Venue: Varese, Italy
- Date: 23–28 September 2008
- Coordinates: 45°49′0″N 8°50′0″E
- Nations participating: 57
- Events: 6

The 2008 UCI Road World Championships took place in Varese, Italy, between September 23 and September 28, 2008. The event consisted of a road race and a time trial for men, women and men under 23.

== Participating nations ==
Cyclists from 57 national federations participated. The number of cyclists per nation that competed is shown in parentheses.

Participating nations
Click on a nation to go to the nations' UCI Road World Championships page
- Algeria
- Argentina
- Australia
- Austria
- Belarus (7)
- Belgium
- Brazil
- Bulgaria (2)
- Canada
- Colombia
- Costa Rica
- Croatia
- Czech Republic (7)
- Denmark
- Ecuador (2)
- El Salvador (3)
- Estonia
- Finland
- France
- Germany
- Great Britain
- Hungary
- Iran
- Ireland (10)
- Italy
- Japan (6)
- Kazakhstan
- Kyrgyzstan (1)
- Latvia
- Lithuania
- Luxembourg (12)
- Macedonia (1)
- Malaysia
- Mexico (3)
- Moldova
- Morocco (1)
- Namibia (1)
- Netherlands (24)
- New Zealand
- Norway
- Poland (18)
- Portugal
- Romania (3)
- Russia
- Saint Kitts and Nevis (1)
- Serbia (6)
- Slovakia (8)
- Slovenia
- South Africa (19)
- Spain
- Sweden
- Switzerland
- Ukraine
- United States
- Uruguay (1)
- Uzbekistan
- Venezuela (11)

== Medal table ==
Place	Nation	1st place, gold medalist(s)	2nd place, silver medalist(s)	3rd place, bronze medalist(s)	Total
1	Italy	2	2	0	4
2	Germany	1	1	3	5
3	United States	1	0	1	2
4	Colombia	1	0	0	1
4	Great Britain	1	0	0	1
6	Austria	0	1	0	1
6	Canada	0	1	0	1
6	Netherlands	0	1	0	1
9	Australia	0	0	1	1
9	Denmark	0	0	1	1
Total		6	6	6	18

== Events summary ==
Event	Gold		Silver		Bronze	
Men's Events
Men's road race	Alessandro Ballan; Italy	6:37:30	Damiano Cunego; Italy	+3"	Matti Breschel; Denmark	+3"
Men's time trial	Bert Grabsch; Germany	52:01.60	Svein Tuft; Canada	+42.79	David Zabriskie; United States	+52.27
Women's Events
Women's road race	Nicole Cooke; Great Britain	3:42:11	Marianne Vos; Netherlands	s.t.	Judith Arndt; Germany	s.t.
Women's time trial	Amber Neben; United States	33:51.35	Christiane Soeder; Austria	+7.56	Judith Arndt; Germany	+21.77
Men's Under-23 Events
Men's under-23 road race	Fabio Duarte; Colombia	4:17:02	Simone Ponzi; Italy	s.t.	John Degenkolb; Germany	s.t.
Men's under-23 time trial	Adriano Malori; Italy	41:35.98	Patrick Gretsch; Germany	+49.67	Cameron Meyer; Australia	+1:04.36

== Race routes ==
Road races

TT women elite & men U23

TT men elite
