= 2001 UCI Road World Championships – Men's time trial =

Men's Individual Time Trial
2001 UCI Road World Championships
- Rainbow jersey

Race details
- Dates: 11 October 2001
- Stages: 1
- Distance: 44.8 km (27.84 mi)
- Winning time: 51' 49.99"

Results
	Winner	Jan Ullrich (GER)	(Germany)
	Second	David Millar (GBR)	(Great Britain)
	Third	Santiago Botero (COL)	(Colombia)

The Men's Individual Time Trial at the 2001 UCI Road World Championships was the 8th edition of the event. The race took place on 11 October 2001 in Lisbon, Portugal. The race was won by Jan Ullrich of Germany.

== Final classification ==
General classification (1–10)

Rank	Rider	Time
1st place, gold medalist(s)	Jan Ullrich (GER)	51' 49.99"
2nd place, silver medalist(s)	David Millar (GBR)	+ 6.30"
3rd place, bronze medalist(s)	Santiago Botero (COL)	+ 11.73"
4	Levi Leipheimer (USA)	+ 24.70"
5	László Bodrogi (HUN)	+ 1' 00.38"
6	Leif Hoste (BEL)	+ 1' 04.28"
7	Santos González (ESP)	+ 1' 26.55"
8	Nathan O'Neill (AUS)	+ 1' 28.88"
9	David Plaza (ESP)	+ 1' 45.77"
10	Michael Blaudzun (DEN)	+ 1' 51.39"
