= Bruno Wolke =

German cyclist

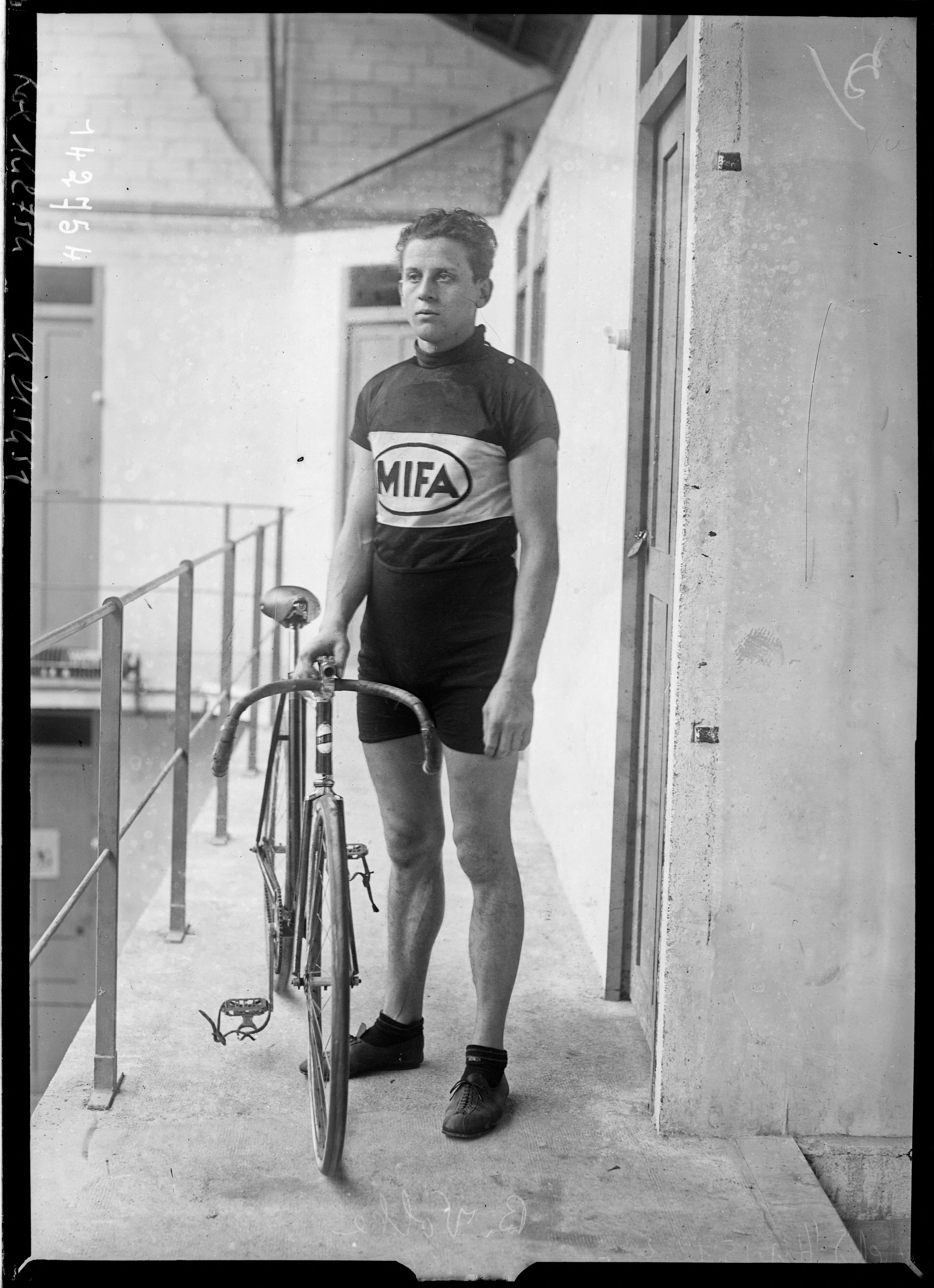

Personal information
- Born: 4 May 1904 Neukölln, German Empire
- Died: 23 December 1973 (aged 69) Rottenburg, West Germany

Cycling career
- Sport: Cycling
- Discipline: Road racing
- Role: Rider

Professional team
- 1928-1930: Mifa
Medal record
Representing Germany
Men's road bicycle racing
World Championships
Bronze medal – third place	1928 Budapest	Elite Men's Road Race

Bruno Wolke (4 May 1904 - 23 December 1973) was a German professional road bicycle racer. Wolke was born in Neukölln. He is best remembered for his bronze medal in the Elite race of the 1928 Road World Championships. He died, aged 69, in Rottenburg.

== Palmares ==
1927
1st, Stage 7, Deutschland Tour
1928 - Mifa
1st, Breslau Rundfahrt
(bronze) World Road Race Championship
3rd, National Road Race Championship
