= 1928 UCI Road World Championships =

- Location within Hungary
- Venue: Budapest, Hungary
- Date: 16 August 1928
- Coordinates: 47°29′33″N 19°03′05″E
- Events: 2

The 1928 UCI Road World Championships was the eighth edition of the UCI Road World Championships.

The championship took place in Hungary on Thursday 16 August 1928. The course, with Budapest as both start and finish place, was around 190km. Only 8 of the professional cyclists finished, with winner Georges Ronsse reaching an average speed of 30.255 km/h.

In the same period, the 1928 UCI Track Cycling World Championships was organized in the Millenáris Sporttelep in Budapest.

== Events summary ==
Event	Gold		Silver		Bronze	
Men's Events
Professional Road Race	Georges Ronsse; Belgium	6h 20' 10"	Herbert Nebe; Germany	+ 19' 43"	Bruno Wolke; Germany	s.t.
Amateur Road Race	Allegro Grandi; Italy	-	Michele Mara; Italy	-	Jean Aerts; Belgium	-

== See also ==
- 1928 UCI Track Cycling World Championships
