= Herbert Nebe =

German cyclist (1899–1985)

Personal information
- Born: 11 May 1899 Leipzig, Germany
- Died: 13 October 1985 (aged 86) Gotha, Germany

Cycling career
- Sport: Cycling
- Discipline: Road cycling
- Role: Rider

Professional teams
- 1928: German Road World Cycling Team
- 1927-1929: Diamant
- 1930: Brennabor
Medal record
Representing Germany
Men's road bicycle racing
World Championships
Silver medal – second place	1928 Budapest	Elite Men's Road Race

Herbert Nebe (11 May 1899 in Leipzig – 13 October 1985 in Gotha) was a German professional road bicycle racer. He is most known for his silver medal in the Elite race of the 1928 Road World Championships.

== Palmares ==
1927 - Diamant
1st, Dresden Rundfarht
10th, World Road Race Championship
1928 - Diamant
1st, Berlin-Cottbus-Berlin
1st, Bayern-Rundfahrt
(silver) World Road Race Championship
2nd, National Road Race Championship
