= Danish National Road Race Championships =

National road cycling championship in Denmark

The champion's jersey

The Danish National Road Race Championships consists of a series of cycling races to decide the national champions for the year to come. The event was first held in 1897.

== Men ==
Year	Gold	Silver	Bronze
1897	Jens Olsen	Charles Hansen	V. Bastrup
1900	O. Meyland Schmidt	Hjersing Petersen	Niels Frandsen
1901	Vilhelm Møller	P. From	Mads Holm
1905– 1935	Race held as a single start, rather than a mass start		
1936	Frode Sørensen	Arne Petersen	Alex Jensen
1937	Georg Nielsen	Georg Sørensen	Christian Christiansen
1938	Frode Sørensen	Rudolf Rasmussen	Georg Nielsen
1939	Wenzel Jørgensen	Børge Saxil Nielsen	Frode Sørensen
1940	Rudolf Rasmussen	Herbert Staun	Wenzel Jørgensen
1941	Rudolf Rasmussen	Christian Christiansen	Georg Sørensen
1942	Rudolf Rasmussen	Wenzel Jørgensen	Børge Saxil Nielsen
1943	Christian Pedersen	Rudolf Rasmussen	Wenzel Jørgensen
1944	Christian Pedersen	Rudolf Rasmussen	Børge Hansen
1945	Christian Pedersen	Børge Saxil Nielsen	Rudolf Rasmussen
1946	Christian Pedersen	Børge Rasmussen	Willy Emborg
1947	Børge Saxil Nielsen	Willy Emborg	Rudolf Rasmussen
1948	Knud Andersen	Freddy Ammentorp	Rudolf Rasmussen
1949	Wedell Østergaard	Christian Pedersen	Willy Emborg
1950	Hans Andresen	Wedell Østergaard	Christian Pedersen
1951	Race cancelled		
1952	Max Jørgensen	Wedell Østergaard	Hans Andresen
1953	Christian Pedersen	Eluf Dalgaard	Fritz Ravn
1954	Eluf Dalgaard	Hans Andresen	Helge Hansen
1955	Hans Andresen	Eluf Dalgaard	Fritz Ravn
1956	Fritz Ravn	Palle Lykke	Eluf Dalgaard
1957	Eluf Dalgaard	Niels Baunsøe	Svend Pedersen
1958	John Grønvald	Christian Johansen	Jørgen Mikkelsen
1959	Ole Krøier	Ole Pingel	Jørgen Jørgensen
1960	Ole Pingel	Bent Peters	Torben Helsgaun
1961	Bent Peters	Arne Christensen	Ole Pingel
1962	Ole Ritter	Svend Pallisø	Ib Varbæk
1963	Ole Pingel	Jørgen Hansen	Mogens Frey
1964	Ole Ritter	Knud Bock	Ole Pringel
1965	Lars Lander	Gerhard Nielsen	Helge Ingemann
1966	Ole Ritter	Villy Skibby	Jørgen Emil
1967	Mogens Frey	Bjarne Sørensen	Svend Erik Bjerg
1968	Verner Blaudzun	Benny Pedersen	Leif Mortensen
1969	Tommy Nielsen	Erik Skelde	Jørgen Schmidt
1970	Verner Blaudzun	Jørgen Schmidt	Bent Pedersen
1971	Bent Pedersen	Svend Erik Bjerg	Asger Iversen
1972	Jørgen Timm	Kim Theils	Tommy Nielsen
1973	Reno Olsen	Verner Blaudzun	Bent Pedersen
1974	Benny Pedersen	Verner Blaudzun	Henning Jørgensen
1975	Jørgen Hansen	Eigil Sørensen	Flemming Hartz
1976	Torben Hjort	Ivar Jakobsen	Gert Frank
1977	Jørgen Knudsen	Jan Gram	Verner Blaudzun
1978	Benny Pedersen	Eigil Sørensen	Henning Jørgensen
1979	Michael Markussen	Verner Blaudzun	Jan Høegh
1980	James Møller	Jørgen Hansen	Henning Jørgensen
1981	Jørgen V. Pedersen	John Carlsen	Ole Redsted
1982	René Andersen	Verner Blaudzun	Vagn Scharling
1983	Michael Markussen	Jens Veggerby	Kim Bybjerg
1984	Kim Eriksen	Vagn Scharling	Per Pedersen
1985	Dan Frost	John Carlsen	Alex Pedersen
1986	Alex Pedersen	Johnny Weltz	Henning Sindahl
1987	Niels Ole Hald	Henning Sindahl	John Carlsen
1988	Søren Lilholt	Bjarne Riis	Kim Eriksen
1989	Johnny Weltz	Jesper Skibby	Per Pedersen
1990	Brian Holm	Søren Lilholt	Peter Clausen
1991	Kim Marcussen	Lars Michaelsen	Per Sindahl
1992	Bjarne Riis	Bo Hamburger	Kenneth Weltz
1993	Kim Marcussen	Alex Pedersen	Klaus Kynde
1994	Michael Blaudzun	Marc Strange Jacobsen	Nicolaj Bo Larsen
1995	Bjarne Riis	Brian Holm	Peter Meinert Nielsen
1996	Bjarne Riis	Bo Hamburger	Jesper Skibby
1997	Nicolaj Bo Larsen	Lars Michaelsen	Rolf Sørensen
1998	Frank Høj	Bo Hamburger	Michael Sandstød
1999	Nicolaj Bo Larsen	Mikael Kyneb	Jacob Moe Rasmussen
2000	Bo Hamburger	Nicolaj Bo Larsen	Rolf Sørensen
2001	Jakob Piil	Nicolaj Bo Larsen	Michael Blaudzun
2002	Michael Sandstød	Michael Blaudzun	Bo Hamburger
2003	Nicki Sørensen	Allan Johansen	Bo Hamburger
2004	Michael Blaudzun	Stig Dam	Matti Breschel
2005	Lars Bak	Lars Michaelsen	Matti Breschel
2006	Allan Johansen	Jacob Moe Rasmussen	Troels Vinther
2007	Alex Rasmussen	Jacob Moe Rasmussen	Jonas Aaen Jørgensen
2008	Nicki Sørensen	Matti Breschel	Jens-Erik Madsen
2009	Matti Breschel	Chris Anker Sørensen	Frank Høj
2010	Nicki Sørensen	Lars Bak	Anders Lund
2011	Nicki Sørensen	Martin Mortensen	Michael Reihs
2012	Sebastian Lander	Nicki Sørensen	André Steensen
2013	Michael Mørkøv	Morten Øllegård	Casper von Folsach
2014	Michael Valgren	Michael Carbel	Michael Mørkøv
2015	Chris Anker Sørensen	Martin Mortensen	Alexander Kamp
2016	Alexander Kamp	Michael Valgren	Lasse Norman Hansen
2017	Mads Pedersen	Nicolai Brøchner	Alexander Kamp
2018	Michael Mørkøv	Niklas Larsen	Michael Carbel
2019	Michael Mørkøv	Kasper Asgreen	Niklas Larsen
2020	Kasper Asgreen	Andreas Kron	Michael Mørkøv
2021	Mads Würtz Schmidt	Frederik Wandahl	Mathias Norsgaard
2022	Alexander Kamp	Mads Pedersen	Mikkel Frølich Honoré
2023	Mattias Skjelmose	Magnus Bak Klaris	Andreas Kron
2024	Rasmus Søjberg Pedersen	Kasper Asgreen	Frederik Wandahl
2025	Søren Kragh Andersen	Mads Pedersen	Casper Pedersen
2026	Magnus Cort Nielsen	Anders Foldager	Anthon Charmig

=== U23 ===
Year	Gold	Silver	Bronze
1996	Tayeb Braikia	Dani Petersen	Jakob Gram Nielsen
1997	Michael Steen Nielsen	René Jørgensen	Dani Petersen
1998	Bjarke Nielsen	Jimmy Hansen	Morten Voss Christiansen
1999	Max Nielsen	Morten Voss Christiansen	Jan Jespersen
2000	Jimmy Hansen	Michael Larsen	Thomas Bruun Eriksen
2001	Thue Houlberg	Søren Svendsen	Morten Knudsen
2002	Martin Pedersen	Michael Berling	Brian Vandborg
2003	Mads Christensen	Brian Vandborg	Lars Frederiksen
2004	Martin Pedersen	Anders Lund	Martin Mortensen
2005	Jan Almblad	Martin Mortensen	Anders Lund
2006	Kasper Jebjerg	Michael Færk Christensen	Alex Rasmussen
2007	Thomas Christiansen	Jakob Bering	Jacob Kodrup
2008	Mads Rydicher	Philip Nielsen	Nikola Aistrup
2009	Rasmus Guldhammer	Troels Vinther	Kaspar Larsen Schjønnemann
2010	Ricky Enø Jørgensen	Christopher Juul-Jensen	Mikkel Mortensen
2011	Lasse Norman Hansen	Christopher Juul-Jensen	Nicolai Steensen
2012	Sebastian Lander	Magnus Cort	Rasmus Sterobo
2013	Lasse Norman Hansen	Alexander Kamp	Kristian Haugaard
2014	Emil Bækhøj Halvorsen	Frederik Plesner	Nicolai Brøchner
2015	Jonas Gregaard	Mads Rahbek	Søren Kragh Andersen
2016	Mads Würtz Schmidt	Casper Pedersen	Andreas Stokbro
2017	Michael Carbel	Andreas Stokbro	Casper Pedersen
2018	Julius Johansen	Niklas Larsen	Andreas Stokbro
2019	Frederik Rodenberg	Oliver Knudsen	Frederik Irgens Jensen
2020	Julius Johansen	Oliver Wulff Frederiksen	Mathias Matz
2021	Frederik Irgens Jensen	Søren Vosgerau	Kristian Hessel
2022	Rasmus Søjberg Pedersen	Sebastian Kolze Changizi	Carl-Frederik Bévort
2023	Rasmus Søjberg Pedersen	Mads Landbo	Henrik Pedersen
2024	Pelle Køster Mikkelsen	Christian Kornum	Asger Røjbek Sørensen
2025	Noah Lindholm Møller Andersen	Aksel Storm	Benjamin Kofoed Thestrup

== Women ==
Year	Gold	Silver	Bronze
1984	Lona Munck	Bettina Falsing	Zitta Jesse
1985	Karina Skibby	Susan Johannesen	Pernille Jørgensen
1986	Helle Sørensen	Karina Skibby	Pernille Jørgensen
1987	Helle Sørensen	Bettina Falsing	Karina Skibby
1988	Hanne Malmberg	Lona Munck	Gitte Hjortflod
1989	Karina Skibby	Helle Sørensen	Bettina Falsing
1990	Karina Skibby	Bettina Falsing	Rikke Sandhoej-Olsen
1991	Karina Skibby	Lona Munck	Sanne Lassen
1992	Sanne Schmidt	Helle Sørensen	Lona Munck
1993	Sanne Schmidt	Hanne Malmberg	Helene Soegaard
1994	Rikke Sandhoej-Olsen	Sanne Schmidt	Helle Jensen
1995	Rikke Sandhoej-Olsen	Helle Sørensen	Lotte Schmidt
1996	Helle Sørensen	Lotte Schmidt	Sanne Schmidt
1997	Rikke Sandhoej-Olsen	Lisbeth Simper	Helle Sørensen
1998	Rikke Sandhoej-Olsen	Lisbeth Simper	Lotte Schmidt
1999	Ann Mathiesen	Rikke Sandhoej-Olsen	Lisbeth Simper
2000	Mette Fischer Andreasen	Linne Lykke Meyer-Nielsen	Sanne Schmidt
2001	Lisbeth Simper	Pernille Langelund Jakobsen	Lotte Bak
2002	Lisbeth Simper	Vibe Jane Kolding	Mette Fischer Andreasen
2003	Lisbeth Simper	Dorte Lohse	Trine Schmidt
2004	Pernille Langelund Jakobsen	Dorte Lohse	Mette Fischer Andreasen
2005	Dorte Lohse	Linda Villumsen	Janne Bruhn-Henriksen
2006	Linda Villumsen	Mie Lacota	Dorte Lohse
2007	Karina Hegelund Nielsen	Dorte Lohse	Trine Schmidt
2008	Linda Villumsen	Maja Adamsen	Iben Bohe
2009	Linda Villumsen	Trine Schmidt	Maria Grandt Petersen
2010	Annika Langvad	Christina Siggaard	Trine Lorentzen
2011	Julie Leth	Iben Bohe	Trine Schmidt
2012	Cathrine Grage	Iben Bohe	Julie Leth
2013	Kamilla Sofie Vallin	Rikke Lonne	Trine Lorentzen
2014	Amalie Dideriksen	Christina Siggaard	Julie Leth
2015	Amalie Dideriksen	Betina Cramer	Christina Siggaard
2016	Emma Norsgaard	Amalie Dideriksen	Betina Cramer
2017	Camilla Møllebro	Trine Andersen	Louise Holm Houbak
2018	Amalie Dideriksen	Emma Norsgaard	Christina Siggaard
2019	Amalie Dideriksen	Pernille Mathiesen	Christina Siggaard
2020	Emma Norsgaard	Julie Leth	Cecilie Uttrup Ludwig
2021	Amalie Dideriksen	Emma Norsgaard	Cecilie Uttrup Ludwig
2022	Cecilie Uttrup Ludwig	Emma Norsgaard	Amalie Dideriksen
2023	Rebecca Koerner	Marie-Louise Hartz Krogager	Amalie Kvist Nybroe
2024	Rebecca Koerner	Amalie Dideriksen	Emma Norsgaard
2025	Alberte Greve	Amalie Dideriksen	Solbjørk Minke Anderson

== See also ==
- Danish National Time Trial Championships
- National road cycling championships
