= List of Tinkoff riders and staff =

Former Team Saxo Bank staff are road bicycle racers and sporting directors previously employed by the professional cycling team of Tinkoff, previously known as Team CSC.

== Former riders ==
Name	Born	Nationality	Previous	Enter	Left	Afterwards
Lars Michaelsen	1969	Denmark	Team Coast	2003	2007	
Christian Vande Velde	1976	United States	Würth	2005	2007	
David Zabriskie	1979	United States	Discovery Channel	2005	2007	Slipstream–Chipotle
Luke Roberts	1977	Australia	ComNet Senges	2005	2007	
Martin Pedersen	1983	Denmark		2006	2007	Team GLS
Ivan Basso	1977	Italy	Fassa Bortolo	2004	2006	Discovery Channel
Giovanni Lombardi	1969	Italy	Domina Vacanze	2005	2006	Retired
Peter Luttenberger	1972	Austria	Tacconi Sport	2003	2006	Vorarlberger
Christian Müller	1982	Germany	(neo-pro)	2005	2006	Skil–Shimano
Andrea Peron	1971	Italy	Fassa Bortolo	2002	2006	Retired
Jakob Piil	1973	Denmark	Acceptcard	2000	2006	T-Mobile Team
Brian Vandborg	1981	Denmark	(neo-pro)	2004	2006	Discovery Channel
Linus Gerdemann	1982	Germany	(neo-pro)	2005	2005	T-Mobile Team
Fabrizio Guidi	1972	Italy	Team Bianchi	2004	2005	Phonak
Vladimir Gusev	1982	Russia	(neo-pro)	2004	2005	Discovery Channel
Thomas Bruun Eriksen	1979	Denmark	(neo-pro)	2002	2005	Retired
Manuel Calvente	1976	Spain	(neo-pro)	2002	2005	Agritubel
Tristan Hoffman	1970	Netherlands	TVM	2000	2005	Sports director for Team CSC
Michele Bartoli	1970	Italy	Fassa Bortolo	2004	2004	Retired
Frank Høj	1973	Denmark	Team Fakta	2004	2004	Gerolsteiner
Jörg Jaksche	1976	Germany	ONCE–Eroski	2004	2004	Liberty Seguros
Maximilian Sciandri	1967	United Kingdom	Lampre	2004	2004	Retired
Bekim Christensen	1973	Denmark	Team Coast	2003	2004	Retired
Jimmi Madsen	1969	Denmark	(without contract)	2002	2004	(track racing)
Michael Sandstød	1968	Denmark	Chicky World	1999	2004	Retired
Lennie Kristensen	1968	Denmark	Team Fakta	2003	2003	Retired
Andrea Tafi	1966	Italy	Mapei	2003	2003	Alessio–Bianchi
Julian Dean	1975	New Zealand	U.S. Postal Service	2002	2003	Crédit Agricole
Tyler Hamilton	1971	United States	U.S. Postal Service	2002	2003	Phonak
Geert Van Bondt	1970	Belgium	Mercury/Viatel	2002	2003	Landbouwkrediet–Colnago
Paul Van Hyfte	1972	Belgium	Lotto–Adecco	2002	2003	Vlaanderen-T Interim
Nicolas Jalabert	1973	France	ONCE–Eroski	2001	2003	Phonak
Arvis Piziks	1969	Latvia	Rabobank	1998	2003	Retired
Michael Rasmussen	1974	Denmark	(mountain biking)	2002	2002	Rabobank
Marcelino Garcia Alonso	1971	Spain	ONCE–Eroski	2001	2002	Labarca-2 Cafe Baque
Olivier Asmaker	1973	France	Festina	2001	2002	
Francisco Cerezo	1971	Spain	Vitalicio Seguras	2001	2002	Labarca-2 Cafe Baque
Laurent Jalabert	1968	France	ONCE–Eroski	2001	2002	Retired
Raphael Jeune	1975	France	(neo-pro)	2001	2002	
Danny Jonassen	1974	Denmark	Team Fakta	2001	2002	Retired
Bjarke Nielsen	1976	Denmark	Chicky World	2000	2002	Team Fakta
Martin Rittsel	1971	Sweden	Chicky World	2000	2002	Team Fakta
Koen Beeckman	1973	Belgium	Lotto–Adecco	2001	2001	
Rolf Sørensen	1965	Denmark	Rabobank	2001	2001	Landbouwkrediet–Colnago
Bo Hamburger	1970	Denmark	Cantina Tollo	2000	2001	Index Alexia
Jacob Moe Rasmussen	1975	Denmark	Acceptcard	2000	2001	Team Fakta
Nicolai Bo Larsen	1971	Denmark	TVM	1999	2001	Gerolsteiner
René Jørgensen	1975	Denmark	(neo-pro)	1998	2001	Team Fakta
Michael Steen Nielsen	1975	Denmark	(neo-pro)	1998	2001	
Matthew Gilmore	1972	Belgium	SPAR-RDM	2000	2000	Vlaanderen-T Interim
Frank Corvers	1969	Belgium	SPAR-RDM	2000	2000	Ville de Charleroi-New Systems
Allan Johansen	1971	Denmark	Chicky World	2000	2000	Team Fakta
Christian Andersen	1967	Denmark	(neo-pro)	1998	2000	Sports director for Team CSC
Mikael Kyneb	1972	Denmark	PSV Team Cologne	1998	2000	Team Fakta
Jesper Skibby	1964	Denmark	TVM	1998	2000	Retired
Federico Colonna	1972	Italy	Asics	1999	1999	Cantina Tollo
Marc Streel	1971	Belgium	Casino–Ag2r Prévoyance	1999	1999	Collstrop–De Federale Verzekeringen
Juris Silovs	1973	Latvia	Schauff Öschelbronn	1998	1999	Cofidis
Marc Strange Jacobsen	1972	Denmark	ABC	1998	1999	Retired
Michael Rosborg	1971	Denmark	(neo-pro)	1998	1999	Retired
Brian Holm	1962	Denmark	Team Telekom	1998	1998	Acceptcard
Danny Nelissen	1970	Netherlands	Rabobank	1998	1998	Retired
Carlos Sastre	1975	Spain	ONCE–Eroski	2001	2008	Cervélo TestTeam

== Former stagiaire ==
Name	Born	Nationality	Year	Afterwards
Kasper Klostergaard	1983	Denmark	2005	Team CSC
Chris Anker Sørensen	1984	Denmark	2005	Team CSC
Andy Schleck	1985	Luxembourg	2004	Team CSC
Roberto Arroyo	1978	Spain	2003	no contract
Morten Knudsen	1981	Denmark	2003	no contract
Pablo Urtasun Perez	1980	Spain	2003	no contract
Javier Ramirez Abeja	1978	Spain	2002	ONCE–Eroski
Fränk Schleck	1980	Luxembourg	2002	CSC–Tiscali
Thomas Bruun Eriksen	1979	Denmark	2001	CSC–Tiscali
Michael Rasmussen	1974	Denmark	2001	CSC–Tiscali

== Former sports directors ==
Name	Born	Nationality	Previous	Enter	Left	Afterwards
Tristan Hoffman	1970	Netherlands	rider for Team CSC	2005	2006	T-Mobile Team
Johnny Weltz		Denmark		2001	2005	TIAA–CREF
Sean Yates	1960	United Kingdom		2003	2004	U.S. Postal Service
Christian Andersen	1967	Denmark	CSC–Tiscali	2001	2004	Barloworld
Jørgen Marcussen		Denmark	Team Coast	2002	2003	none
Per Pedersen	1964	Denmark	none	2002	2003	
Alex Pedersen	1966	Denmark	none	1998	2003	none
Torben Kølbæk		Denmark	none	1998	2000	none
