= List of wins by home–Jack & Jones and its successors =

This is a comprehensive list of victories of the Tinkoff cycling team.

== 1998 home–Jack & Jones ==
Stage 2 Étoile de Bessèges, Christian Andersen
Omloop Vlaamse Ardennen, Jesper Skibby
Latvian Road Racing Championship, Juris Silovs
Stage 4, Tour de Wallonie, Mikael Kyneb
Stage 4A, Danmark Rundt, Michael Steen Nielsen
Schaal Schels Merksem, Danny Nelissen
Stage 3, Hessen Rundfahrt, Danny Nelissen
Stage 5A, Hessen Rundfahrt, Arvis Piziks
Stage 3, Vic Health Vic Health Herald Sun Tour, Arvis Piziks

== 1999 home–Jack & Jones ==
Stage 1 Tour Down Under, Nicolaj-Bo Larsen
Rund um den Flughafen Köln-Bonn, Michael Steen Nielsen
Stage 5, Four Days of Dunkirk, Michael Sandstød
Four Days of Dunkirk, Michael Sandstød
GP Midtbank, Michael Sandstød
Fyn Rundt, Nicolaj-Bo Larsen
Stage 5, Tour de Luxembourg, Jesper Skibby
Stage 3, Postgirot Open, Jesper Skibby
Stage 4, Postgirot Open, Nicolaj-Bo Larsen
Denmark Individual Time Trial Championship, Michael Sandstød
Denmark Road Racing Championship, Nicolaj-Bo Larsen
Prologue, DEKRA Open, Michael Blaudzun
Prologue, Tour de la Region Wallonne, Marc Streel
Circuito de Gexto, Jesper Skibby
Stage 1, Tour de la Region Wallonne, Mikael Kyneb
Stage 4B, Tour de la Region Wallonne Marc Streel
Tour de la Region Wallonne, Mikael Kyneb
Stage 5, Danmark Rundt, Michael Steen Nielsen
Grote Prijs Jef Scherens, Marc Streel
Zomergem-Adinderke, Marc Streel
Belgium Individual Time Trial Championship, Marc Streel
Overall Vic Health Herald Sun Tour Michael Blaudzun

Stage 2 & 10 Nicolaj-Bo Larsen
Stage 9 Christian Andersen
Stage 10 Nicolaj-Bo Larsen
Stage 13 Michael Blaudzun

== 2000 Memory Card–Jack & Jones ==
Stage 4, Paris–Nice, Bo Hamburger
A Travers la Belgique, Tristan Hoffman
Overall Four Days of Dunkirk Martin Rittsel

Stage 1 Four Days of DunkirkArvis Piziks

Overall Tour de l'Oise, Michael Sandstød

Stage 2 & 4 Tour de l'Oise, Michael Sandstød

GP Midtbank, Michael Sandstød
Samsung Mobile GP, Arvis Piziks
Stage 4 Postgirot Open, Nicolaj-Bo Larsen
Denmark Individual Time Trial Championship, Michael Sandstød
Denmark Road Racing Championship, Bo Hamburger
Latvia Road Racing Championship, Arvis Piziks
Stage 4 Rheinland-Pfalz Rundfahrt, Bo Hamburger

== 2001 CSC–Tiscali ==
Grand Prix d'Ouverture La Marseillaise, Jakob Piil
Samsung Mobile GP, Michael Sandstød
Overall Peace Race, Jakob Piil

Stages 3 & 7, Jakob Piil

Overall Tour de Picardie, Olivier Asmaker

Stage 1, Olivier Asmaker

Denmark Individual Time Trial Championship, Michael Blaudzun
Denmark Road Racing Championship, Jakob Piil
Stages 4 & 7 2001 Tour de France, Laurent Jalabert
Clásica de San Sebastián, Laurent Jalabert
Fyn Rundt, Nicolaj-Bo Larsen
Overall Hessen Rundfahrt, Michael Blaudzun
Stage 3, Marcelino García
Stage 5, Rheinland-Pfalz Rundfahrt, Danny Jonasson

== 2002 CSC–Tiscali ==
Tour du Haut Var, Laurent Jalabert
Stage 3, Paris–Nice, Laurent Jalabert
CSC Classic, Laurent Jalabert
Overall Tour de Picardie, Michael Sandstød

Stage 1, Michael Sandstød

Stage 14, Giro d'Italia, Tyler Hamilton
Denmark Individual Time Trial Championship, Michael Sandstød
Denmark Road Racing Championship, Michael Sandstød
Clásica de San Sebastián, Laurent Jalabert
Danmark Rundt, Jakob Piil

Stage 1, Jakob Piil

Stage 4, Vuelta Ciclista a Burgos, Michael Rasmussen
Coppa Ugo Agostoni, Laurent Jalabert
Stage 2, Tour du Poitou Charentes, Nicolas Jalabert
Stage 3, Rheinland-Pfalz Rundfahrt, Geert van Bondt
Paris–Tours, Jakob Piil

== 2003 Team CSC ==
Stage 3, International Tour of Rhodos, Thomas Bruun Eriksen
Internationale Niedersachsen-Rundfahrt, Nicolas Jalabert
Liège–Bastogne–Liège, Tyler Hamilton
CSC Classic, Jakob Piil
Overall Tour de Romandie, Tyler Hamilton
Stage 5, Tyler Hamilton
Stage 2 Four Days of Dunkirk, Lars Michaelsen
Stage 5 Peace Race, Thomas Bruun Eriksen
Wachovia Cycling Series – Lancaster, Jakob Piil
Wachovia Cycling Series – Trenton, Julian Dean
Denmark Individual Time Trial Championship, Michael Blaudzun
Denmark Road Racing Championship, Nicki Sørensen
Stage 10, 2003 Tour de France, Jakob Piil
Stage 13, 2003 Tour de France, Carlos Sastre
Stage 16, 2003 Tour de France, Tyler Hamilton
Tour de Wallonie 2.3, Belgium, Julian Dean

Stages 4 & 5, Julian Dean

Stage 2, Internationale Hessen-Rundfahrt, Lars Michaelsen
Stage 2, Circuit Franco-Belge, Julian Dean
Firenze-Pistoria, Andrea Peron

== 2004 Team CSC ==
Overall Tour de Méditeranéen, Jörg Jaksche

Stage 5, Jörg Jaksche

Overall Paris–Nice, Jörg Jaksche

Stage 1, Jörg Jaksche

Critérium International, Jens Voigt

Stages 2 & 3Jens Voigt

Stage 5a, Tour of the Basque Country, Jens Voigt
Stage 5b, Tour of the Basque Country, Bobby Julich
GP S.A.T.S., Frank Høj
CSC Classic, Kurt Asle Arvesen
Bayern Rundfahrt, Jens Voigt
Denmark Individual Time Trial Championship, Michael Sandstød
Denmark Road Racing Championship, Michael Blaudzun
Stage 12, 2004 Tour de France, Ivan Basso
Stage 2, Tour de Wallonie, Fabrizio Guidi
LuK Challenge - Bühl, Bobby Julich and Jens Voigt
Overall Danmark Rundt, Kurt Asle Arvesen

Stage 2, Fabrizio Guidi
Stage 4, Jens Voigt

Giro dell'Emilia, Ivan Basso

== 2005 Team CSC ==
GP Ouverture la Marseillaise, Nicki Sørensen
Overall Tour of Qatar, Lars Michaelsen

Stage 3, Lars Michaelsen

Stage 3, Étoile de Bességes, Jens Voigt
Overall Tour Méditeranéen, Jens Voigt

Stages 1 & 3, Tour Méditeranéen, Jens Voigt
Stage 4 (TTT) (Note: With the team of Lars Bak, Vladimir Gusev, Bobby Julich, Luke Roberts, Fränk Schleck, Nicki Sørensen, Jens Voigt and David Zabriskie.)

Overall Critérium International, Bobby Julich

Stage 3, Bobby Julich

Stage 4, Tour de Georgia, Brian Vandborg
GP Herning, Michael Blaudzun
Stage 4 Bayern Rundfahrt, Jens Voigt
Denmark Individual Time Trial Championship, Michael Blaudzun
Luxembourg Individual Time Trial Championship, Andy Schleck
Russia Individual Time Trial Championship, Vladimir Gusev
Denmark Road Racing Championship, Lars Bak
Luxembourg Road Racing Championship, Fränk Schleck
Stage 4, Sachsen-Tour International, Allan Johansen
Stage 5, Sachsen-Tour International, Christian Müller
LuK Challenge Chrono Bühl, Bobby Julich and Jens Voigt
Overall Danmark Rundt, Ivan Basso

Stages 1, 2, 3 & 5, Ivan Basso

Tour de l'Avenir, Lars Bak

Stage 1, Lars Bak
Stage 5, Christian Müller

Paris–Bourges, Lars Bak
Overall Paris–Nice, Bobby Julich

Prologue, Jens Voigt

Stage 5 Tour of the Basque Country, Jens Voigt
Stages 17 & 18 Giro d'Italia Ivan Basso
Stage 7 Tour de Suisse, Linus Gerdemann
Overall Eneco Tour, Bobby Julich

Stage 7, Bobby Julich

Stage 18 Vuelta a España, Nicki Sørensen

== 2006 Team CSC ==
Stage 2 (TTT), Settimana Ciclistica Internazionale (Note: With the team of David Zabriskie, Jakob Piil, Volodymyr Hustov, Nicki Sørensen, Michael Blaudzun, Kasper Klostergaard, Giovanni Lombardi and Peter Luttenberger.)
Overall, Critérium International, Ivan Basso

Stage 2, Ivan Basso

Stage 2b, Circuit de la Sarthe, Ivan Basso
Klasika Primavera, Carlos Sastre
Stage 1, Tour de Georgia, Lars Michaelsen
GP Herning, Allan Johansen
Overall, Tour de Luxembourg, Christian Vande Velde

Stage 1, Allan Johansen

Overall, Ster Elektrotoer, Kurt Asle Arvesen

Stage 4, Ster Elektrotoer, Jens Voigt

Australia Individual Time Trial Championship, Peter Luttenberger
Denmark Individual Time Trial Championship, Brian Vandborg
Norway Individual Time Trial Championship, Kurt Asle Arvesen
Switzerland Individual Time Trial Championship, Fabian Cancellara
Stages 3 & 5, Sachsen Tour, Andy Schleck
Stage 2, Paris–Corrèze, Marcus Ljungqvist
Overall, Danmark Rundt, Fabian Cancellara

Stages 2 & 5, Fabian Cancellara

Rund um die Hainleite, Jens Voigt
Giro Bochum, Jens Voigt
Overall, Tour of Britain, Martin Pedersen

Stage 1, Martin Pedersen

United States Time Trial Championship, David Zabriskie
Stage 2 & 5, 3-Länder-Tour, Karsten Kroon
Stage 4, 3-Länder-Tour, Luke Roberts
World Time Trial Championships, Fabian Cancellara
Prologue Paris–Nice, Bobby Julich
Stage 5 (ITT) Tirreno–Adriatico, Fabian Cancellara
Paris–Roubaix, Fabian Cancellara
Amstel Gold Race, Fränk Schleck
Overall Giro d'Italia, Ivan Basso

Stage 5 (TTT) (Note: The nine riders were: Ivan Basso, Michael Blaudzun, Íñigo Cuesta, Volodymyr Hustov, Bobby Julich, Giovanni Lombardi, Carlos Sastre, Nicki Sørensen, Jens Voigt.)
Stages 8, 16 & 20 Giro d'Italia, Ivan Basso
Stage 1 Volta a Catalunya, Fabian Cancellara

Eindhoven Team Time Trial, Team CSC (Note: he riders were: Lars Bak, Michael Blaudzun, Bobby Julich, Christian Müller, Stuart O'Grady, Brian Vandborg, Jens Voigt, and David Zabriskie.)
Stage 13 Tour de France, Jens Voigt
Stage 15 Tour de France, Fränk Schleck
Stage 17 Tour de France, Carlos Sastre
Overall Deutschland Tour, Jens Voigt

Stages 2, 6 & 7, Jens Voigt

Stage 1 (TTT) Vuelta a España, (Note: The nine riders were: Kurt Asle Arvesen, Lars Bak, Fabian Cancellara, Íñigo Cuesta, Stuart O'Grady, Volodymyr Hustov, Marcus Ljungqvist, Carlos Sastre, Nicki Sørensen)

== 2007 Team CSC ==
Stages 2 & 6 Tour of California, Juan José Haedo
Stage 3 Tour of California, Jens Voigt
Overall Critérium International, Jens Voigt

Stage 2, Jens Voigt

Rund um Köln, Juan José Haedo
Stage 7, Tour de Georgia, Juan José Haedo
GP Herning 1.1, Denmark, Kurt Asle Arvesen
Switzerland Individual Time Trial Championship, Fabian Cancellara
Overall Danmark Rundt, Kurt Asle Arvesen
Stage 2, Matti Breschel
Stage 3, Kurt Asle Arvesen
Stage 2 Tour of Ireland, Matti Breschel
Stage 3 Tour of Britain, Matthew Goss
Stage 3 Paris–Nice, Alexandr Kolobnev
Paris–Roubaix Stuart O'Grady
Stage 8 2007 Giro d'Italia, Kurt Asle Arvesen
Stages 1 & 9 2007 Tour de Suisse, Fabian Cancellara
2007 Eindhoven Team Time Trial (Note: The eight riders were: Michael Blaudzun, Matthew Goss, Bobby Julich, Marcus Ljungqvist, Luke Roberts, Nicki Sørensen, Christian Vande Velde and David Zabriskie.)
Prologue & Stage 3 2007 Tour de France, Fabian Cancellara
Overall 2007 Deutschland Tour, Jens Voigt
World Time Trial Championships, Fabian Cancellara

== 2008 Team CSC / CSC–Saxo Bank ==
Stages 1 & 5 Tour de San Luis, Juan José Haedo
Prologue Tour of California, Fabian Cancellara
Stage 1 Tour of California, Juan José Haedo
Clásica de Almería, Juan José Haedo
Stage 3 Vuelta Ciclista a Murcia, Juan José Haedo
Monte Paschi Eroica, Fabian Cancellara
Overall Tirreno–Adriatico, Fabian Cancellara

Stage 5, Fabian Cancellara

Milan–San Remo, Fabian Cancellara
Stage 2 Vuelta a Castilla y León, Karsten Kroon
E3 Prijs Vlaanderen, Kurt Asle Arvesen
2008 Critérium International, Jens Voigt
Stage 2, Tour de Georgia, Juan José Haedo
Rund um den Henninger Turm, Karsten Kroon
Stage 18, Giro d'Italia, Jens Voigt
Prologue, Skoda-Tour de Luxembourg, Fabian Cancellara
Stage 1, Skoda-Tour de Luxembourg, Juan José Haedo
Philadelphia International Championship, Matti Breschel
Stage 1, Ster Elektrotoer, Matti Breschel
Switzerland Individual Time Trial Championship, Fabian Cancellara
Denmark Individual Time Trial Championship, Lars Bak
Denmark Road Racing Championship, Nicki Sørensen
Luxembourg Road Racing Championship, Fränk Schleck
Norway Road Racing Championship, Kurt Asle Arvesen
Stage 2, Tour of Austria, Chris Anker Sørensen
Overall Tour de France, Carlos Sastre

Stage 11, Kurt Asle Arvesen
Stage 17, Carlos Sastre

Stage 5, Sachsen-Tour International, Karsten Kroon
Stages 2 & 3, Post Danmark Rundt, Matti Breschel
Stage 5 Post Danmark Rundt Gustav Larsson
Stage 6, Post Danmark Rundt Juan José Haedo
Olympic Games Individual Time Trial Championship, Fabian Cancellara
Stage 2, Tour of Britain, Matthew Goss
Stage 21, Vuelta a España, Matti Breschel
Overall Herald Sun Tour, Stuart O'Grady

Prologue & Stage 1 Herald Sun Tour, Matthew Goss
Stages 2 & 5, Herald Sun Tour, Stuart O'Grady

Stage 6 Critérium du Dauphiné Libéré, Chris Anker Sørensen
Stages 7 & 9 Tour de Suisse, Fabian Cancellara
Stage 20 Tour de France, Fabian Cancellara
Overall Tour de Pologne, Jens Voigt

Stage 6, Jens Voigt

== 2009 Team Saxo Bank ==
Prologue, Tour of California, Fabian Cancellara
Stage 8, Tour of California, Fränk Schleck
2009 GP Cholet, Juan José Haedo
2009 Critérium International, Jens Voigt

Stage 2, Jens Voigt

Overall Tour de Luxembourg, Fränk Schleck

Stage 2, Andy Schleck
Stage 3, Fränk Schleck
Stage 4, Matti Breschel

2009 Tour of Slovenia, Jakob Fuglsang

Stage 1, Jakob Fuglsang

Stage 2, Tour de Wallonie, Juan José Haedo
Stage 3 & 5, Tour de Wallonie, Matthew Goss
Post Danmark Rundt, Jakob Fuglsang

Stage 1, Matti Breschel
Stage 2, Nicki Sørensen
Stage 3, Jakob Fuglsang

Overall Tour du Poitou-Charentes, Gustav Larsson

Stage 3, Gustav Larsson

Stage 4 Tour of Missouri, Juan José Haedo
2009 Paris–Brussels, Matthew Goss
World Time Trial Championships, Fabian Cancellara
Stage 4 Circuit Franco-Belge, Juan José Haedo
Japan Cup, Chris Anker Sørensen
Liège–Bastogne–Liège, Andy Schleck
Stage 2 Volta a Catalunya, Matti Breschel
Overall Tour de Suisse, Fabian Cancellara

Stages 1 & 9, Fabian Cancellara
Stage 4, Matti Breschel

Stage 1 Tour de France, Fabian Cancellara
Stage 12 Tour de France, Nicki Sørensen
Stage 17 Tour de France, Fränk Schleck
Stage 5 Eneco Tour, Lars Bak
Stages 1 & 7 Vuelta a España, Fabian Cancellara

== 2010 Team Saxo Bank ==
Stage 4 Bay Cycling Classic, Baden Cooke
Berlin Six Days, Alex Rasmussen
Berlin Six Days, Michael Mørkøv
København Six Days, Michael Mørkøv
København Six Days, Alex Rasmussen
Overall Tour of Oman, Fabian Cancellara
Tour de Mumbai II, Juan José Haedo
Stage 4 Vuelta a Andalucía, Alex Rasmussen
Dwars door Vlaanderen, Matti Breschel
Stage 4 Volta Ciclista a Catalunya, Jens Voigt
World Track Championships (Scratch), Alex Rasmussen
E3 Harelbeke, Fabian Cancellara
Stage 7 Volta Ciclista a Catalunya, Juan José Haedo
Ronde van Vlaanderen, Fabian Cancellara
Paris–Roubaix, Fabian Cancellara
Stage 3 Tour de Romandie, Richie Porte
Stage 1 & 3 Four days of Dunkirk, Alex Rasmussen
Stage 8 Giro d'Italia, Chris Anker Sørensen
Stage 21 Giro d'Italia, Gustav-Erik Larsson
Young rider classification Giro d'Italia, Richie Porte
Stage 2 Tour de Luxembourg, Fränk Schleck
Stage 2 Critérium du Dauphiné, Juan José Haedo
Overall Tour de Suisse, Fränk Schleck

Stage 1, Fabian Cancellara
Stage 3, Fränk Schleck

Sweden National Time Trial Championship, Gustav Larsson
Denmark National Time Trial Championship, Jakob Fuglsang
Luxembourg National Time Trial Championship, Andy Schleck
Poland National Time Trial Championship, Jarosław Marycz
Denmark National Road Race Championship, Nicki Sørensen
Luxembourg National Road Race Championship, Fränk Schleck
Stage 1 Vuelta Ciclista a la Comunidad de Madrid, Gustav Larsson
Overall Tour de France, Andy Schleck

Young rider classification, Andy Schleck
Prologue Tour de France, Fabian Cancellara
Stage 8 Tour de France, Andy Schleck
Stage 17, Andy Schleck
Stage 19, Fabian Cancellara

Overall Post Danmark Rundt, Jakob Fuglsang

Stage 3, Matti Breschel

Overall Tour du Limousin, Gustav Larsson

Stage 2, Gustav Larsson

World Time Trial Championships, Fabian Cancellara
Amstel Curaçao Race: Fränk Schleck
Denmark National Track Championships (Madison), Alex Rasmussen
Denmark National Track Championships (Madison), Michael Mørkøv

== 2011 Saxo Bank–SunGard ==
Dwars door Vlaanderen, Nick Nuyens
Stage 4 Vuelta a Castilla y León, Richie Porte
Stage 3 Ster ZLM Toer, Juan José Haedo
Denmark Road Racing Championship, Nicki Sørensen
Stage 5 Danmark Rundt, Richie Porte
Grand Prix d'Isbergues, Jonas Aaen Jørgensen
Stage 3, Tirreno–Adriatico, Juan José Haedo
Tour of Flanders, Nick Nuyens
Stage 16 Vuelta a España, Juan José Haedo

== 2012 Team Saxo Bank / Saxo Bank–Tinkoff Bank ==
Stages 3 & 5 Tour de San Luis, Alberto Contador
Stages 4 & 7 Tour de Taiwan, Jonathan Cantwell
GP de Denain Porte du Hainaut, Juan José Haedo
G.P. Beghelli, Nicki Sørensen
Stage 3 Tour de l'Ain, Daniel Navarro
Milano–Torino, Alberto Contador
Overall Vuelta a España, Alberto Contador

Stage 17 Vuelta a España, Alberto Contador

== 2013 Saxo–Tinkoff ==
Stage 6, Tour de San Luis, Alberto Contador
Amstel Gold Race, Roman Kreuziger
Denmark Road Race Championship, Michael Mørkøv
Stages 2 & 3, Danmark Rundt, Matti Breschel
Stage 2 Vuelta a España, Nicolas Roche
Stage 6 Vuelta a España, Michael Mørkøv
Japan Cup, Michael Rogers

== 2014 Tinkoff–Saxo ==
Stage 4 Volta ao Algarve, Alberto Contador
Overall Tirreno–Adriatico, Alberto Contador

Stages 4 & 5, Alberto Contador

Overall Tour of the Basque Country, Alberto Contador

Stage 1, Alberto Contador

Stages 11 & 20 Giro d'Italia, Michael Rogers
Overall Tour de Luxembourg, Matti Breschel

Stages 2 & 3, Matti Breschel

Overall Route du Sud, Nicolas Roche

Stage 2, Nicolas Roche

Denmark Road Race Championship, Michael Valgren
Stage 6 Tour of Austria, Evgeni Petrov
Mountains classification Tour de France, Rafał Majka

Stages 14 & 17, Rafał Majka
Stage 16 Michael Rogers

Overall Tour de Pologne, Rafał Majka

Stages 5 & 6, Rafał Majka

Overall Danmark Rundt, Michael Valgren

Stage 3, Manuele Boaro

Overall Vuelta a España, Alberto Contador

Combination classification, Alberto Contador
Stages 16 & 20, Alberto Contador

== 2015 Tinkoff–Saxo ==
Stage 3 Vuelta a Andalucía, Alberto Contador
Stage 3 Circuit de la Sarthe, Manuele Boaro
Stage 6 Tirreno–Adriatico, Peter Sagan
Overall Tour of California, Peter Sagan

Stages 4 & 6 (ITT), Peter Sagan

Overall Tour of Norway, Jesper Hansen

Stage 3, Jesper Hansen

Overall Giro d'Italia, Alberto Contador
Stages 3 & 6 Tour de Suisse, Peter Sagan
Overall Route du Sud, Alberto Contador

Stage 3, Alberto Contador

Denmark National Time Trial Championship, Christopher Juul-Jensen
Slovakia National Time Trial Championship, Peter Sagan
Denmark National Road Race Championship, Chris Anker Sørensen
Slovakia National Road Race Championship, Peter Sagan
Points classification Tour de France, Peter Sagan
Stage 11 Tour de France, Rafał Majka
Stage 4 Tour de Pologne, Maciej Bodnar
Overall Danmark Rundt, Christopher Juul-Jensen

Stages 3 & 4, Matti Breschel
Stage 6, Michael Mørkøv

Stage 6 USA Pro Cycling Challenge, Roman Kreuziger
Stage 3 Vuelta a España, Peter Sagan

== 2016 Tinkoff ==
Stage 2 Tour Down Under, Jay McCarthy
Stage 1 Vuelta a Andalucía, Daniele Bennati
Stage 3 Vuelta a Andalucía, Oscar Gatto
Stage 5 Volta ao Algarve, Alberto Contador
Points classification Tirreno–Adriatico, Peter Sagan
Gent–Wevelgem, Peter Sagan
Tour of Flanders, Peter Sagan
Overall Tour of the Basque Country, Alberto Contador

Stage 5 (ITT), Alberto Contador

Stage 5 (TTT), Tour of Croatia
Stages 1 & 4 Tour of California, Peter Sagan
Prologue (ITT) Critérium du Dauphiné, Alberto Contador
Stages 2 & 3 Tour de Suisse, Peter Sagan
Poland National Time Trial Championship, Maciej Bodnar
Poland National Road Race Championship, Rafał Majka
Slovakia National Road Race Championship, Juraj Sagan
Points classification Tour de France, Peter Sagan
Mountain classification Tour de France, Rafał Majka

Stages 2, 11 & 16 Tour de France, Peter Sagan

Overall Danmark Rundt, Michael Valgren

Stage 3, Michael Valgren

Grand Prix Cycliste de Québec, Peter Sagan
Europe Road Race Championship, Peter Sagan
Points classification Eneco Tour, Peter Sagan

Stages 3 & 4, Peter Sagan

== Supplementary statistics ==
Grand Tours by highest finishing position
Race	1998	1999	2000	2001	2002	2003	2004	2005	2006	2007	2008	2009	2010	2011	2012	2013	2014	2015	2016
Giro d'Italia	–	–	–	–	2	–	–	28	1	2	14	16	7	28	63	7	6	1	5
Tour de France	–	–	36	19	10	4	3	2	3	4	1	2	1	37	14	4	26	5	10
Vuelta a España	–	–	–	–	–	24	6	3	4	2	3	31	4	12	1	5	1	3	4
Major week-long stage races by highest finishing position
Race	1998	1999	2000	2001	2002	2003	2004	2005	2006	2007	2008	2009	2010	2011	2012	2013	2014	2015	2016
Tour Down Under	N/A	2	9	11	6	2	–	–	–	3	10	2	11	10	34	21	11	14	4
Paris–Nice	–	–	7	47	3	36	1	1	5	8	25	2	5	22	15	16	31	20	2
Tirreno–Adriatico	–	–	–	25	30	23	–	49	6	6	1	85	62	33	23	3	1	5	2
Volta a Catalunya	–	–	22	–	–	–	–	16	15	22	39	6	20	29	21	23	2	4	2
Tour of the Basque Country	–	–	–	–	27	2	4	5	42	8	10	17	13	17	16	5	1	15	1
Tour de Romandie	–	–	–	–	5	1	7	14	26	8	19	6	10	42	23	29	13	7	20
Critérium du Dauphiné	–	–	–	–	35	34	14	27	25	5	18	6	47	11	15	6	2	14	5
Tour de Suisse	–	–	–	9	–	42	13	4	6	7	6	1	1	27	11	3	8	10	109
Tour de Pologne	–	–	–	–	–	–	–	11	13	7	1	28	36	24	13	4	1	13	12
Eneco Tour	13	–	12	22	10	31	5	1	16	35	29	7	4	19	4	28	32	7	3
Monument races by highest finishing position
Race	1998	1999	2000	2001	2002	2003	2004	2005	2006	2007	2008	2009	2010	2011	2012	2013	2014	2015	2016
Milan–San Remo	–	–	10	10	28	29	36	23	20	5	1	14	11	21	60	28	18	4	12
Tour of Flanders	23	–	5	4	21	47	8	10	6	4	7	6	1	1	18	25	13	4	1
Paris–Roubaix	–	–	4	10	4	5	2	5	1	1	2	9	1	22	7	15	35	23	11
Liège–Bastogne–Liège	–	–	33	17	17	1	8	2	7	3	3	1	5	6	25	17	7	5	7
Giro di Lombardia	–	–	–	26	28	11	3	3	7	4	5	3	4	26	9	3	23	69	35
Classics by highest finishing position
Classic	1998	1999	2000	2001	2002	2003	2004	2005	2006	2007	2008	2009	2010	2011	2012	2013	2014	2015	2016
Omloop Het Nieuwsblad	–	24	7	4	58	49	–	12	27	5	8	36	53	–	–	–	–	–	2
Kuurne–Brussels–Kuurne	11	8	6	13	8	–	14	DNF	26	25	3	4	DNF	–	–	–	–	–	7
Strade Bianche	Did not Exist									1	1	8	10	–	–	–	5	11	4
E3 Harelbeke	21	10	40	5	26	14	31	10	6	2	1	33	1	12	13	52	23	6	2
Gent–Wevelgem	90	6	4	4	9	37	8	17	6	24	8	3	8	10	17	13	18	10	1
Amstel Gold Race	55	–	43	19	39	34	15	14	1	10	2	2	7	21	16	1	18	14	2
La Flèche Wallonne	–	–	18	28	16	14	15	20	3	7	31	2	8	23	33	17	8	11	11
Clásica de San Sebastián	–	–	61	1	1	52	6	17	21	7	2	15	10	23	7	3	20	13	22
Paris–Tours	20	12	29	17	1	6	64	12	2	34	17	30	25	3	44	2	14	16	–

== Sources ==
- Team Saxo Bank Official Website (English)
- Team CSC Official Website
- CykelSupportDanmark, Team CSC's official Danish fan club
- Lars Werge, "Drømmeholdet – historien om CSC" (The dream team – the history of CSC), Denmark, 2005, ISBN 87-7731-206-6
