= Fyen Rundt =

Danish one-day road cycling race

Race details
- Date: June (until 2018); August (since 2019)
- Region: Funen
- English name: Tour of Fyen
- Discipline: Road race
- Competition: UCI Europe Tour
- Type: Single-day
- Web site: fyenrundt.com

History
- First edition: 1894
- Editions: 115 (as of 2026)
- First winner: H. A. Gregersen (DEN)
- Most wins: Jacob Moe Rasmussen (DEN) (4 wins)
- Most recent: Mads Andersen (DEN)

Fyen Rundt is a professional single-day cycling race held annually in Denmark. It is part of the UCI Europe Tour in category 1.2. The race has been held since 1894, making it one of the oldest cycling races.

== Winners ==
=== Amateur ===
- 1894 : (Denmark) H. A. Gregersen
- 1895 : (Denmark) Knud Mortensen
- 1896 : (Denmark) J. P. Andersen & (Denmark) Knud Mortensen
- 1897 : (Denmark) Henrik Henriksen
- 1898 : (Denmark) O. Wahlquist
- 1899 : (Denmark) O. Jensen
- 1900 : (Denmark) Hans Nielsen
- 1901 : (Denmark) H. P. Larsen
- 1902 : (Denmark) H. P. Larsen
- 1903 : (Denmark) Carl Andreasen
- 1904 : (Denmark) H. P. Hansen
- 1905 : (Denmark) Ernst Jensen
- 1906 : (Denmark) H. P. Larsen
- 1907 : (Denmark) Ernst Jensen
- 1908 : (Denmark) Godtfred Hegelund Olsen
- 1909 : No race
- 1910 : (Denmark) F. Rosted
- 1911 : (Denmark) Niels Poulsen
- 1912 : (Denmark) Johan Jensen
- 1913 : (Denmark) Carl Andreasen
- 1914–1922 : No race
- 1923 : (Denmark) Svend Aage Johansen
- 1924 : (Denmark) Hans Eriksen
- 1925 : (Denmark) Erik Eloe Andersen
- 1926 : (Denmark) Eigil Jensen
- 1927 : (Denmark) Henry-Peter Hansen
- 1928 : (Denmark) Orla Jørgensen
- 1929 : (Denmark) Oluf Clausen
- 1930 : (Denmark) Henry-Peter Hansen
- 1931 : (Denmark) Valdemar Christiansen
- 1932 : No race
- 1933 : (Denmark) Arthur Johansen
- 1934 : No race
- 1935 : (Denmark) Arthur Johansen
- 1936 : (Denmark) Arthur Johansen
- 1937 : (Denmark) Emanuel Hansen
- 1938 : (Denmark) Bent A. Madsen
- 1939 : (Denmark) Georg Sørensen
- 1940 : (Denmark) Frode Sørensen
- 1941 : (Denmark) Rudolf Rasmussen
- 1942 : (Denmark) Christian Pedersen
- 1943 : (Denmark) Georg Sørensen
- 1944 : (Denmark) Christian Pedersen
- 1945 : (Denmark) Tor Mikkelsen
- 1946 : (Denmark) Rudolf Rasmussen
- 1947 : (Denmark) Viggo Hansen
- 1948 : (Denmark) Bent A. Nielsen
- 1949 : (Denmark) Poul Dideriksen
- 1950 : (Sweden) Evert Larsson
- 1951 : (Denmark) Stig Nedergaard
- 1952 : (Denmark) Leif Johannes Nielsen
- 1953 : (Denmark) Helmuth Hansen
- 1954 : (Denmark) Jørgen Frank Rasmussen
- 1955 : (Denmark) Leif Lund Nielsen
- 1956 : (Denmark) Bendy Pedersen
- 1957 : (Denmark) Bendy Pedersen
- 1958 : (Denmark) Mogens Tvilling
- 1959 : (Denmark) Poul Nielsen
- 1960 : (Denmark) Knud Enemark
- 1961 : (Denmark) Leif Larsen
- 1962 : (Denmark) Jens Peter Ilsøe
- 1963 : (Denmark) Jens Peter Ilsøe
- 1964 : (Denmark) Ole Højlund
- 1965 : (Denmark) Jens Andersen
- 1966 : (Denmark) Johnny Knudsen
- 1967 : (Denmark) Johnny Knudsen
- 1968 : (Denmark) Verner Blaudzun
- 1969 : (Denmark) Verner Blaudzun
- 1970 : No race
- 1971 : (Denmark) Jørgen Schmidt
- 1972 : (Belgium) René Dillen
- 1973–1976 : No race
- 1977 : (Denmark) Henning Jørgensen
- 1978 : (Denmark) Jan Høegh
- 1979 : (Norway) Jon Rangfred Hansen
- 1980 : (Denmark) Eigil Sørensen
- 1981 : (Denmark) René Byrgesen
- 1982 : (Denmark) René Byrgesen
- 1983 : (Denmark) Michael Markussen
- 1984 : (Denmark) Niels Ole Hald
- 1985 : (Denmark) Kim Kronborg
- 1986 : (Denmark) Vagn Scharling
- 1987 : (Denmark) Benny Pedersen
- 1988 : (Denmark) Vagn Scharling
- 1989 : (Denmark) Benny Pedersen
- 1990 : (Denmark) Claus Michael Holm
- 1991 : (Denmark) Magnus Knutsson
- 1992 : (Denmark) Kim Marcussen
- 1993 : (Denmark) Kim Marcussen
- 1994 : (Denmark) Marc Strange Jacobsen
- 1995 : (Sweden) Johan Fagrell

=== Professional ===
Year	Country	Rider	Team
1996	Denmark	Michael Sandstød	Denmark (national team)
1997	Denmark	Michael Steen Nielsen	Køge
1998	Canada	Brian Walton	Saturn
1999	Denmark	Nicolaj Bo Larsen	home–Jack & Jones
2000	Denmark	Morten Sonne	Team Fakta
2001	Denmark	Nicolaj Bo Larsen	CSC–Tiscali
2002	Denmark	Jacob Moe Rasmussen	EDS–Fakta
2003	Denmark	Jacob Moe Rasmussen	Team Fakta
2004	Denmark	Jacob Moe Rasmussen	Team PH
2005	Denmark	Jacob Moe Rasmussen	Team GLS
2006	Denmark	Alex Rasmussen	Team Odense Energi
2007	Denmark	Michael Berling	Glud & Marstrand–Horsens
2008	Denmark	Lars Ulrich	Team Odense Energi
2009	Denmark	Daniel Foder	Concordia–Vesthimmerland
2010	Denmark	Jens-Erik Madsen	Team Designa Køkken–Blue Water
2011	Denmark	Michael Mørkøv	Saxo Bank–SunGard
2012	Italy	Angelo Furlan	Christina Watches–Onfone
2013	Denmark	Asbjørn Kragh Andersen	Team TreFor
2014	Denmark	Kasper Klostergaard	Riwal Cycling Team
2015	Norway	Andreas Vangstad	Team Sparebanken Sør
2016	Denmark	Mads Pedersen	Stölting Service Group
2017	Norway	Audun Fløtten	Uno-X Hydrogen Development Team
2018	Denmark	Mads Pedersen	Trek–Segafredo
2019	Denmark	Rasmus Quaade	Riwal Readynez
2020	No race due to the COVID-19 pandemic in Denmark		
2021	Denmark	Niklas Larsen	Uno-X Pro Cycling Team
2022	Denmark	Mads Pedersen	Denmark (national team)
2023	Denmark	Carl-Frederik Bévort	Uno-X Dare Development Team
2024	Denmark	Lasse Norman Leth	Team CO:PLAY–Giant Store
2025	Denmark	Daniel Stampe	BHS–PL Beton Bornholm
2026	Denmark	Mads Andersen	Swatt Club
