= Danish National Time Trial Championships =

National road cycling championship in Denmark

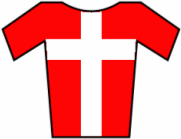
The champion's jersey

Danish National Time Trial Championships consists of a series of cycling races to decide the national champions for the year to come.

== Men ==
Year	Gold	Silver	Bronze
1995	Jan-Bo Petersen	Michael Steen Nielsen	Jimmi Madsen
1996	Bjarne Riis	Jan-Bo Petersen	Michael Blaudzun
1997	Michael Sandstød	Bjarne Riis	Peter Meinert Nielsen
1998	Michael Sandstød	Peter Meinert Nielsen	Michael Steen Nielsen
1999	Michael Sandstød	Jesper Skibby	Michael Steen Nielsen
2000	Michael Sandstød	Michael Blaudzun	Bekim Christensen
2001	Michael Blaudzun	Jørgen Bo Petersen	Bjarke Schmidt Nielsen
2002	Michael Sandstød	Lennie Kristensen	Michael Blaudzun
2003	Michael Blaudzun	Jørgen Bo Petersen	Brian Vandborg
2004	Michael Sandstød	Frank Høj	Brian Vandborg
2005	Michael Blaudzun	Brian Vandborg	Lars Bak
2006	Brian Vandborg	Jacob Moe Rasmussen	Allan Johansen
2007	Lars Bak	Brian Vandborg	Jacob Kollerup Jensen
2008	Lars Bak	Frank Høj	Michael Blaudzun
2009	Lars Bak	Alex Rasmussen	Jakob Fuglsang
2010	Jakob Fuglsang	Alex Rasmussen	Michael Mørkøv
2011	Rasmus Quaade	Jakob Fuglsang	Mads Christensen
2012	Jakob Fuglsang	André Steensen	Michael Mørkøv
2013	Brian Vandborg	Rasmus Quaade	Rasmus Sterobo
2014	Rasmus Quaade	Christopher Juul-Jensen	Michael Valgren
2015	Christopher Juul-Jensen	Rasmus Quaade	Mads Würtz Schmidt
2016	Martin Toft Madsen	Michael Valgren	Kasper Asgreen
2017	Martin Toft Madsen	Kasper Asgreen	Mikkel Bjerg
2018	Martin Toft Madsen	Mikkel Bjerg	Rasmus Quaade
2019	Kasper Asgreen	Martin Toft Madsen	Johan Price-Pejtersen
2020	Kasper Asgreen	Martin Toft Madsen	Frederik Muff
2021	Kasper Asgreen	Mikkel Bjerg	Martin Toft Madsen
2022	Mathias Norsgaard	Magnus Cort	Mattias Skjelmose Jensen
2023	Kasper Asgreen	Mattias Skjelmose Jensen	Mikkel Bjerg
2024	Johan Price-Pejtersen	Mattias Skjelmose Jensen	Kasper Asgreen
2025	Mads Pedersen	Niklas Larsen	Kasper Asgreen

=== U23 ===
Year	Gold	Silver	Bronze
2000	Thue Houlberg	Thomas Bruun Eriksen	Henrik Grundsøe
2001	Thue Houlberg	Lasse Siggaard	Rasmus Dyring
2002	Brian Vandborg	Rasmus Dyring	Jacob Kollerup
2003	Brian Vandborg	Mads Christensen	Michael Tronborg
2004	Mads Christensen	Lasse Bøchman	Morten Ryberg
2005	Martin Mortensen	Michael Tronborg	Lasse Bøchman
2006	Alex Rasmussen	Martin Mortensen	Michael Færk Christensen
2007	André Steensen	Michael Færk Christensen	Casper Jørgensen
2008	Michael Færk Christensen	Daniel Kreutzfeldt	Anders Hilligsøe
2009	Jimmi Sørensen	Rasmus Quaade	Daniel Kreutzfeldt
2010	Rasmus Quaade	Jimmi Sørensen	Niki Byrgesen
2011	Rasmus Quaade	Jimmi Sørensen	Lasse Norman Hansen
2012	Rasmus Quaade	Rasmus Sterobo	Lasse Norman Hansen
2013	Lasse Norman Hansen	Casper von Folsach	Rasmus Sterobo
2014	Søren Kragh Andersen	Emil Wang	Mads Pedersen
2015	Mads Würtz Schmidt	Søren Kragh Andersen	Mathias Westergaard
2016	Mads Würtz Schmidt	Kasper Asgreen	Rasmus Bøgh Wallin
2017	Kasper Asgreen	Mikkel Bjerg	Mathias Norsgaard
2018	Mathias Norsgaard	Johan Price-Pejtersen	Andreas Stokbro
2019	Johan Price-Pejtersen	Mikkel Bjerg	Mathias Norsgaard
2020	Julius Johansen	Johan Price-Pejtersen	Mads Østergaard Kristensen
2021	Johan Price-Pejtersen	Marcus Sander Hansen	Julius Johansen
2022	Matias Malmberg	Adam Holm Jørgensen	Mads Andersen
2023	Rasmus Søjberg	Mads Landbo	Henrik Pedersen
2023	Carl-Frederik Bévort	Gustav Wang	Joshua Gudnitz
2024	Gustav Wang	Henrik Pedersen	Kristian Egholm
2025	Mads Landbo	Alfred Christensen	Gustav Wang

== Women ==
Year	Gold	Silver	Bronze
1995	Susanne Nedergaard	Melina Rasmussen	Lotte Bak
1996	Lotte Schmidt	Melina Rasmussen	Lotte Bak
1997	Helle Sørensen	Helle Jensen	Melina Rasmussen
1998	Melina Rasmussen	Lisbeth Simper	Sanne Schmidt
1999	Lisbeth Simper	Helle Sørensen	Ann Svendsgaard
2000	Lisbeth Simper	Sanne Schmidt	Pernille Langelund Jakobsen
2001	Lisbeth Simper	Sanne Schmidt	Lotte Bak
2002	Lisbeth Simper	Vibe Jane Kolding	Pernille Langelund Jakobsen
2003	Lisbeth Simper	Vibe Jane Kolding	Christina Peick Andersen
2004	Mette Andersen	Trine Hansen	Christina Peick Andersen
2005	Dorte Rasmussen	Trine Hansen	Linda Villumsen
2006	Linda Villumsen	Trine Hansen	Dorte Rasmussen
2007	Trine Schmidt	Dorte Rasmussen	Annette Dam Fialla
2008	Linda Villumsen	Trine Schmidt	Maja Adamsen
2009	Linda Villumsen	Trine Schmidt	Margriet Kloppenburg
2010	Annika Langvad	Trine Schmidt	Maria Grandt Petersen
2011	Annika Langvad	Michelle Lauge Jensen	Trine Schmidt
2012	Cathrine Grage	Michelle Lauge Jensen	Julie Leth
2013	Annika Langvad	Kamilla Sofie Vallin	Julie Leth
2014	Julie Leth	Kamilla Sofie Vallin	Camilla Møllebro
2015	Rikke Lønne	Camilla Møllebro	Amalie Dideriksen
2016	Cecilie Uttrup Ludwig	Trine Schmidt	Kamilla Sofie Vallin
2017	Cecilie Uttrup Ludwig	Pernille Mathiesen	Louise Norman Hansen
2018	Cecilie Uttrup Ludwig	Pernille Mathiesen	Annika Langvad
2019	Louise Hansen	Pernille Mathiesen	Louise Holm
2020	Amalie Dideriksen	Trine Schmidt	Birgitte Krogsgaard
2021	Emma Norsgaard	Louise Holm	Cecilie Uttrup Ludwig
2022	Emma Norsgaard	Julie Leth	Trine Andersen
2023	Emma Norsgaard	Cecilie Uttrup Ludwig	Julie Nielsen Maribo
2024	Emma Norsgaard	Rebecca Koerner	Alberte Greve
2025	Rebecca Koerner	Gertrud Riis Madsen	Emma Norsgaard

== See also ==
- Danish National Road Race Championships
- National Road Cycling Championships
