= Jørgen Bo Petersen =

Danish cyclist (born 1970)

Personal information
- Born: 11 April 1970 (age 56) Hørsholm, Denmark

Cycling career
- Sport: Cycling
- Current team: Retired
- Discipline: Road
- Role: Rider

Professional teams
- 2000: Ville de Charleroi–New Systems
- 2001–2003: Team Fakta
- 2004: BankGiroLoterij

Jørgen Bo Petersen (born 11 April 1970) is a Danish former cyclist.

== Major results ==
1992
2nd National Time Trial Championships
2000
3rd Overall Tour de l'Oise
6th Trophée des Grimpeurs
2001
1st National Team Time Trial Championships (with Jimmy Hansen and Michael Skelde)
1st Overall Tour de Luxembourg
1st Overall Sachsen Tour

1st Stage 4a (ITT)

1st Stage 3 Paris–Corrèze
2nd National Time Trial Championships
2002
1st GP Triberg-Schwarzwald
1st Stage 5 Circuit des Mines
2nd Overall Tour de Normandie
2nd Overall Sachsen Tour
2nd Sparkassen Giro Bochum
3rd Classique des Alpes
6th Overall Tour de Luxembourg
6th Overall Tour of Austria
2003
2nd National Time Trial Championships
3rd Overall Tour du Poitou-Charentes
3rd CSC Classic
