= Børge Nielsen =

Børge Nielsen may refer to:

- Børge Nielsen (gymnast) (1924–2017), Danish Olympic gymnast
- Børge Raahauge Nielsen (1920–2010), Danish rower
- Børge Saxil Nielsen (1920–1977), Danish cyclist
- Børge Nielsen (motorcyclist)
