= 2009 Papua New Guinea cholera outbreak =

Disease outbreak in Papua New Guinea

The Papua New Guinea cholera outbreak was an outbreak of cholera along the Northern Coast of Papua New Guinea. It was the country's first outbreak of cholera in 50 years, and spread across the country from two coastal villages near Lae to villages around MAdang and to remote areas along the Sepik River.

== History ==
The outbreak began in Morobe Province in July 2009, but by February 2010, it had spread to Madang and East Sepik, according to World Health Organization representative Eigil Sorensen. The rapid spread of the disease was due to poor water sanitation, and travel by infected people who did not show symptoms. According to Sorensen, many areas of Papua New Guinea, often crowded settlements or the outskirts of cities with no proper sewage systems, provided the "ideal conditions" for a nationwide cholera epidemic, and the disease was "gradually spreading" all over the country.

An estimated 2,000 cases have been confirmed, but only 50 people have died.
