= Lars Bak =

Danish cyclist (born 1980)

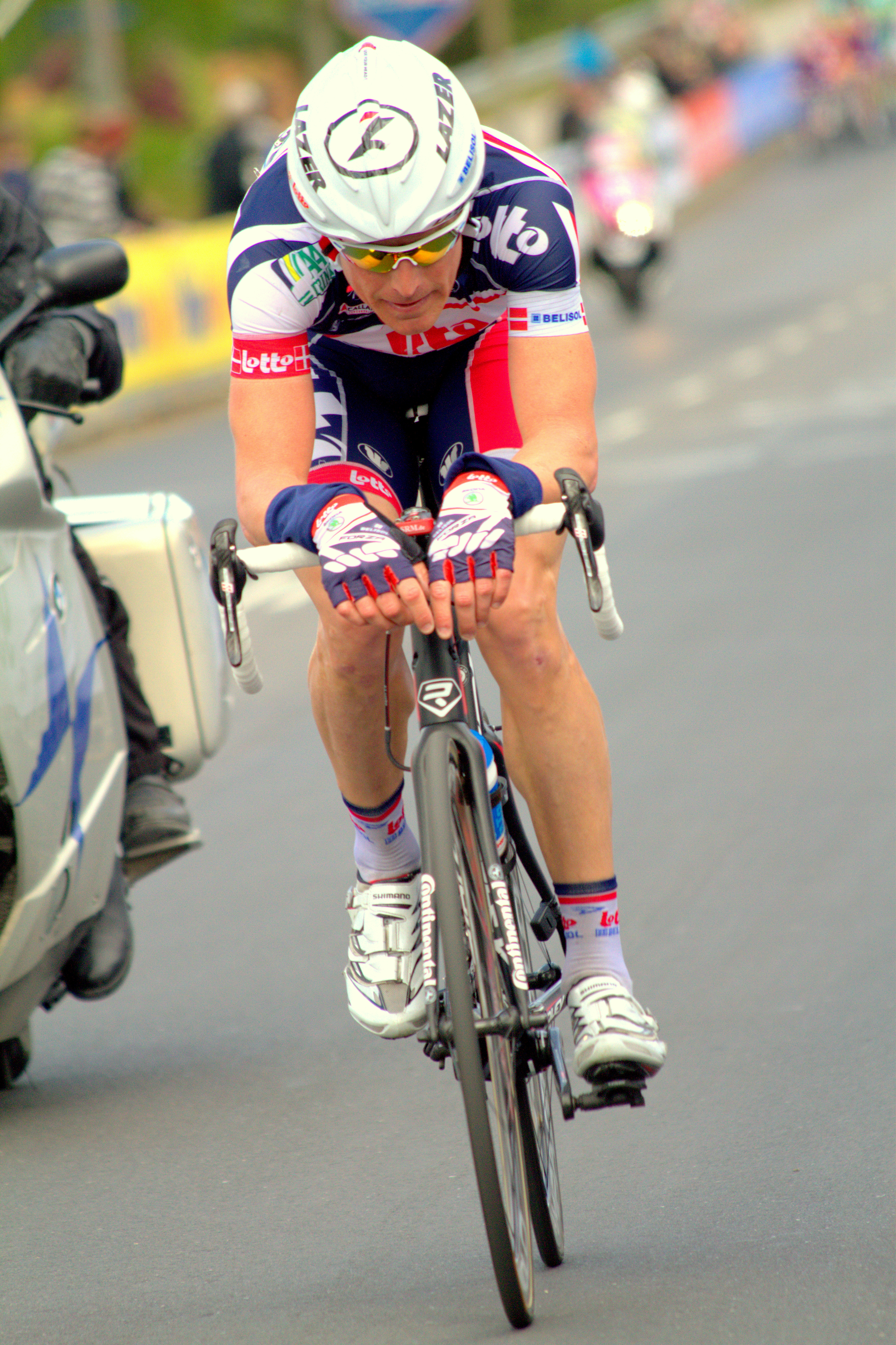
- Bak at the 2012 Giro d'Italia.

Personal information
- Full name: Lars Ytting Bak
- Born: 16 January 1980 (age 46) Silkeborg, Denmark
- Height: 1.91 m (6 ft 3 in)
- Weight: 80 kg (176 lb; 12 st 8 lb)

Cycling career
- Sport: Cycling
- Current team: Retired
- Discipline: Road
- Role: Rider; Directeur sportif
- Rider type: All-rounder

Amateur teams
- 1996–1999: Silkeborg CR
- 2000–2001: Hammel CK
- 2001: CCI Differdange
- 2001: UC Trevigiani-Mapei

Professional teams
- 2002–2003: Team Fakta
- 2004: BankGiroLoterij
- 2005–2009: Team CSC
- 2010–2011: Team HTC–Columbia
- 2012–2018: Lotto–Belisol
- 2019: Team Dimension Data

Managerial teams
- 2020: NTT Pro Cycling
- 2022: Uno-X Pro Cycling Team

Major wins
- Grand Tours Giro d'Italia 1 individual stage (2012) 1 TTT stage (2011) Vuelta a España 1 TTT stage (2010) Single-day races and Classics National Road Race Championships (2005) National Time Trial Championships (2007, 2008, 2009) GP de Fourmies (2012)

Lars Ytting Bak (born 16 January 1980) is a Danish former professional road bicycle racer, who rode professionally between 2002 and 2019 for the Fakta, BankGiroLoterij, Team Saxo Bank, HTC–Highroad, Lotto–Soudal and Team Dimension Data squads. Since retiring as a rider, Bak has acted as a directeur sportif for NTT Pro Cycling in 2020, and as team manager for UCI Women's WorldTeam Uno-X Pro Cycling Team in 2022. He now works as an expert for Danish TV2, commentating events like Tour De France.

== Background ==
Born in Silkeborg, Bak became a professional in 2002 for Team Fakta where he rode with fellow Dane Allan Johansen. In 2004 they both switched to BankGiroLoterij where Lars Bak would gain his first professional win. The BankGiroLoterij team disbanded after the 2004 season, both Bak and Johansen went to Team CSC in 2005.

Here, Bak won the Danish National Road Race Championships. as he won the respected ten stage Under 25 race, the Tour de l'Avenir. He won the leader's jersey by sprinting to the win in a group of four riders on the first stage, a position he defended through the following nine stages bar one, including a time trial and a number of hilly stages.

In 2011 he finally made his Tour de France debut where he worked hard for Mark Cavendish's sprint train and finished off by taking part in a breakaway on the last stage. Bak joined Lotto–Belisol for the 2012 season.

In 2012, he won stage 12 of the Giro d'Italia.

Bak retired at the end of the 2019 season after 18 years as a professional.

== Major results ==
2000
1st Stage 2a Le Triptyque des Monts et Châteaux
2001
5th Overall Le Triptyque des Monts et Châteaux
2003
6th Veenendaal–Veenendaal
6th Druivenkoers Overijse
7th Omloop van de Vlaamse Scheldeboorden
2004
5th Kampioenschap van Vlaanderen
9th Overall Tour de Luxembourg

1st Stage 1

9th Overall Danmark Rundt
2005
National Road Championships

1st Road race
3rd Time trial

1st Overall Tour de l'Avenir

1st Stage 1

1st Paris–Bourges
6th CSC Classic
2006
1st Stage 1 (TTT) Vuelta a España
1st Eindhoven Team Time Trial
4th Overall Bayern Rundfahrt
8th Grand Prix d'Ouverture La Marseillaise
2007
1st Time trial, National Road Championships
1st Stage 5 Tour de Wallonie
3rd Overall Tour Down Under
6th Overall Four Days of Dunkirk
2008
1st Time trial, National Road Championships
2nd Overall Tour de Pologne

1st Stage 1 (TTT)

2nd Overall Herald Sun Tour
7th Overall Bayern Rundfahrt
9th Overall Sachsen Tour
9th Overall Circuit Franco-Belge
2009
1st Time trial, National Road Championships
6th Overall Tour de Romandie
7th Overall Eneco Tour

1st Stage 5

8th Overall Danmark Rundt
9th Overall Tour of Missouri
2010
1st Stage 1 (TTT) Vuelta a España
2nd Road race, National Road Championships
8th Overall Danmark Rundt
2011
1st Stage 1 (TTT) Giro d'Italia
3rd GP Herning
5th Paris–Roubaix
8th Overall Ster ZLM Toer
2012
1st Grand Prix de Fourmies
1st Stage 12 Giro d'Italia
10th Overall Ster ZLM Toer
2013
2nd Overall Danmark Rundt
2014
2nd Overall Danmark Rundt
2015
2nd Overall Danmark Rundt
6th Overall Three Days of De Panne
2018
10th Cadel Evans Great Ocean Road Race
2019
7th Paris–Tours

=== Grand Tour general classification results timeline ===
Grand Tour	2003	2004	2005	2006	2007	2008	2009	2010	2011	2012	2013	2014	2015	2016	2017	2018	2019
Giro d'Italia	DNF	—	—	—	—	—	16	—	126	72	94	56	90	DNF	118	106	—
Tour de France	—	—	—	—	—	—	—	—	152	96	108	82	37	173	123	—	147
Vuelta a España	—	—	—	21	—	—	—	154	—	—	—	—	—	—	—	—	—

Legend
—	Did not compete
DNF	Did not finish
