= Rasmus Søjberg Pedersen =

Danish cyclist

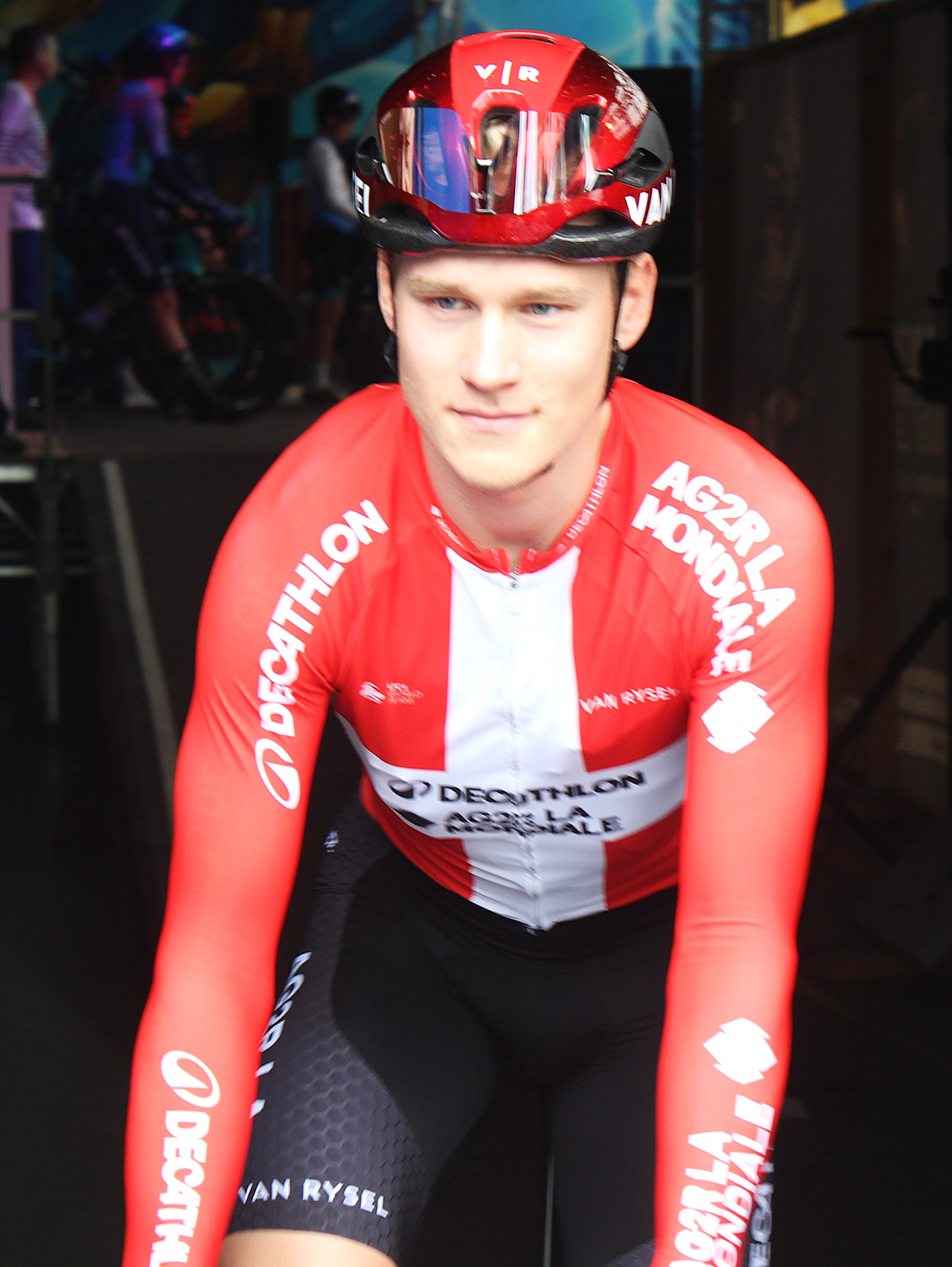
- Pedersen in 2025

Personal information
- Born: 9 July 2002 (age 24) Esbjerg, Denmark
- Height: 1.82 m (6 ft 0 in)
- Weight: 73 kg (161 lb)

Cycling career
- Sport: Cycling
- Current team: Decathlon CMA CGM Team
- Discipline: Road
- Role: Rider

Amateur teams
- 2015–2019: Esbjerg Cykle Ring
- 2019–2020: Give Cykelklub
- 2021: Team O.B. Wiik–Dan Stillads

Professional teams
- 2022: BHS–PL Beton Bornholm
- 2023: CIC U Nantes Atlantique
- 2024: Decathlon–AG2R La Mondiale Development Team
- 2025–: Decathlon–AG2R La Mondiale

Major wins
- One-day races and Classics National Road Race Championships (2024)

Rasmus Søjberg Pedersen (born 9 July 2002) is a Danish road cyclist, who rides for UCI WorldTeam Decathlon CMA CGM Team. He won the elite race at the 2024 Danish National Road Race Championships, after having won the under-23 category the two years prior.

== Major results ==
2021
5th Skive–Løbet
6th Himmerland Rundt
2022
1st Road race, National Under-23 Road Championships
9th Gylne Gutuer
10th Ringerike GP
2023
1st Road race, National Under-23 Road Championships
9th Paris–Camembert
9th Gent–Wevelgem Beloften
2024 (1 pro win)
National Road Championships

1st Road race
4th Time trial

1st Grand Prix Herning
2nd Overall Olympia's Tour

1st Stages 4 & 5

2nd Gent–Wevelgem Beloften
3rd Poreč Trophy
6th Road race, UEC European Under-23 Road Championships
9th Youngster Coast Challenge
2025
3rd Fyen Rundt
4th Paris–Chauny
6th Grand Prix Herning
2026 (1)
1st Stage 5 Danmark Rundt
2nd Overall Tour Poitou-Charentes en Nouvelle-Aquitaine
4th Road race, National Road Championships
4th Tour de Vendée
