= Thomas Eriksen =

Thomas Eriksen may refer to:

- Thomas Bruun Eriksen (born 1979), Danish road bicycle racer
- Thomas Hylland Eriksen (born 1962), Norwegian anthropologist
