= Alex Pedersen (cyclist) =

Danish cyclist (born 1966)

Personal information
- Full name: Alex Kjeld Pedersen
- Born: 15 November 1966 (age 59) Ikast, Denmark

Cycling career
- Sport: Cycling
- Current team: Retired
- Discipline: Road
- Role: Rider

Professional teams
- 1988–1989: RMO–Cycles Méral–Mavic
- 1990–1991: ONCE

Alex Kjeld Pedersen (born 15 November 1966) is a Danish former cyclist.

== Major results ==
1983
1st Junior team time trial, World Road Championships (with Kim Olsen, Søren Lilholt and Rolf Sørensen)
1st Overall Giro della Lunigiana
1984
3rd Junior road race, World Road Championships
1985
1st National team time trial championships (with Bjarne Riis, Per Pedersen and Björn Sørensen)
3rd Amateur National Road Race Championships
1986
1st Amateur National Road Race Championships
1987
1st Stage 8 Grand Prix Guillaume Tell
3rd Amateur road race, World Road Championships
1990
1st Stage 5 Ringerike GP
3rd National Time Trial Championships
7th Overall Vuelta a Andalucía
10th Overall Paris–Nice
1992
1st Amateur National Road Race Championships
1993
1st Grand Prix François-Faber
2nd Amateur National Road Race Championships
3rd National Time Trial Championships
1994
1st Amateur road race, World Road Championships
1st Gran Premio della Liberazione
3rd Overall Toer Report

1st Stage 7

=== Grand Tour general classification results timeline ===
Grand Tour	1989	1990
Giro d'Italia	—	52
Tour de France	—	—
Vuelta a España	133	—

Legend
—	Did not compete
DNF	Did not finish
