= Michael Tronborg =

Danish cyclist (born 1983)

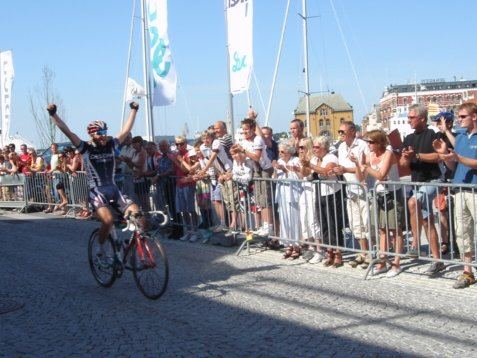
- Tronborg in 2008

Personal information
- Full name: Michael Tronborg Kristensen
- Born: 3 July 1983 (age 43) Denmark

Cycling career
- Sport: Cycling
- Current team: Retired
- Discipline: Road
- Role: Rider

Professional teams
- 2006: Continental Team Differdange
- 2007–2009: Team Designa Køkken
- 2010: Glud & Marstrand–LRØ Radgivning
- 2011: Differdange–Magic–SportFood.de
- 2012: Team TreFor

Michael Tronborg Kristensen (born 3 July 1983) is a Danish former professional cyclist.

== Major results ==
2003
1st Stage 2 Doble Copacabana GP Fides
3rd Road race, National Road Championships
2006
1st Stage 2 Arden Challenge
2007
3rd Chrono Champenois
2008
1st Rogaland Grand Prix
1st Duo Normand (with Martin Mortensen)
2nd Omloop van het Houtland
3rd Post Cup
2010
3rd Dwars door het Hageland
