= Kamilla Sofie Vallin =

Danish cyclist

Personal information
- Born: 18 August 1993 (age 33) Hellerup, Capital Region, Denmark

Cycling career
- Sport: Cycling
- Current team: Team Rytger powered by Cykeltøj-Online.dk
- Role: Rider

Professional team
- 2013-: Rytger Cycling Team

Kamilla Sofie Vallin (born 18 August 1993) is a Danish professional racing cyclist. In 2012, she took the Overall classification at Rás na mBan. In 2013, she won the Danish National Road Race Championships and took the silver medal at the Danish National Time Trial Championships. She rides for Team Rytger.

== See also ==
- List of 2015 UCI Women's Teams and riders
