= Kasper Asgreen =

Danish cyclist (born 1995)

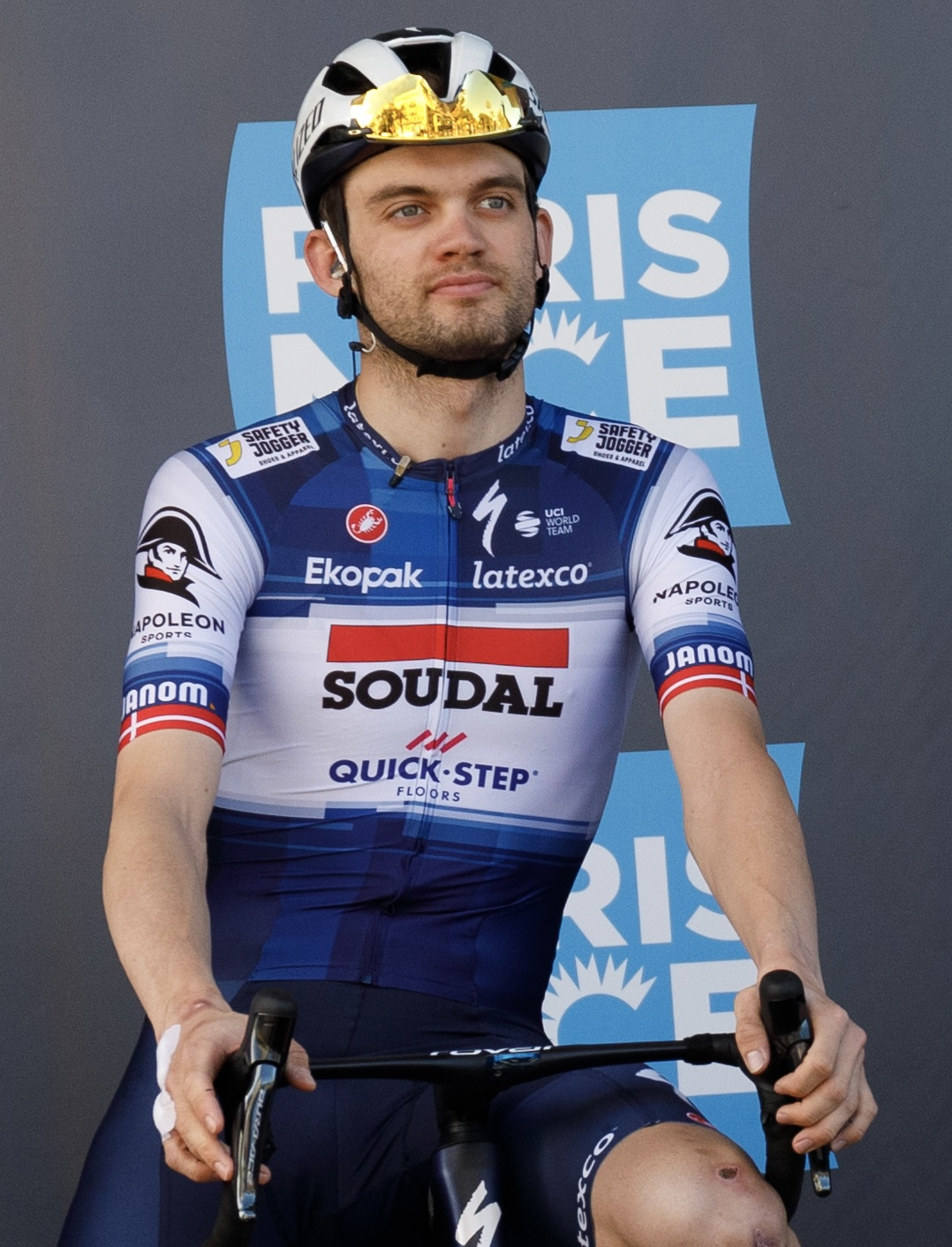
- Asgreen, Nice. Paris–Nice 2023.

Personal information
- Full name: Kasper Asgreen
- Born: 8 February 1995 (age 31) Kolding, Denmark
- Height: 1.92 m (6 ft 3 1/2 in)
- Weight: 75 kg (165 lb; 11 st 11 lb)

Cycling career
- Sport: Cycling
- Current team: EF Education–EasyPost
- Discipline: Road
- Role: Rider
- Rider type: Classics specialist; Time trialist

Amateur team
- 2014: Odder CK

Professional teams
- 2015: MLP Team Bergstraße
- 2016–2018: Team TreFor
- 2018–2024: Quick-Step Floors
- 2025–: EF Education–EasyPost

Major wins
- Grand Tours Tour de France 1 individual stage (2023) Giro d’Italia 1 individual stage (2025) One-day races and Classics National Road Race Championships (2020) National Time Trial Championships (2019, 2020, 2021, 2023) Tour of Flanders (2021) E3 Saxo Bank Classic (2021) Kuurne–Brussels–Kuurne (2020)
Medal record
Representing Denmark
Men's road bicycle racing
World Championships
Gold medal – first place	2018 Innsbruck	Team time trial
European Championships
Silver medal – second place	2019 Alkmaar	Elite time trial

Kasper Asgreen (born 8 February 1995) is a Danish cyclist, who as of 2026 rides for UCI WorldTeam EF Education–EasyPost. Asgreen won the 2021 Tour of Flanders by defeating Mathieu van der Poel in a sprint finish.

== Early life ==
Asgreen was born in Kolding in the south of Denmark. He competed in dressage up to the age of 14, before joining Kolding Cycling Club.

== Career ==
Asgreen signed for Danish Continental cycling team Team Waoo in 2016. In the same year, he finished second in the U23 event at the Danish National Time Trial Championships, as well as finishing second in the senior event. In 2017, he won the U23 time trial at the Danish National Championships, alongside the U23 event at the European Road Championships.

Asgreen signed for World Tour team Quick-Step Floors in April 2018 and began riding with the team in the same month. Following strong performances in his first few races, including at the Scheldeprijs where he helped team-mate Fabio Jakobsen to victory, he was named on the start list of the 2018 Vuelta a España. He was also part of the Quick-Step team which won the Team Time Trial event at the 2018 UCI Road World Championships.

In 2019, Asgreen finished second in the Tour of Flanders on his race debut, the only rider to escape a chasing group behind race leader Alberto Bettiol. He also won the second stage of the 2019 Tour of California after accelerating on the final turn from a group containing Tejay Van Garderen and Gianni Moscon, plus a stage at the Deutschland Tour. Later in the year, he won his first title in the Men's Senior event at the Danish National Time Trial Championships.

In March 2020, Asgreen won the Kuurne–Brussels–Kuurne race by a margin of three seconds from the peloton, after bridging across to an existing breakaway earlier in the race. He also retained his title at the Danish National Time Trial Championships, as well as the Road Race, accelerating away from Andreas Kron to take victory by nine seconds.

Asgreen began his 2021 season with a victory at the E3 Saxo Bank Classic, attacking with five kilometres to go after having participated in a previous breakaway. A week later, he claimed his first monument win at the 2021 Tour of Flanders, beating race favourite Mathieu van der Poel in a sprint after the pair rode clear together. He also won the Danish National Time Trial for the third consecutive year.

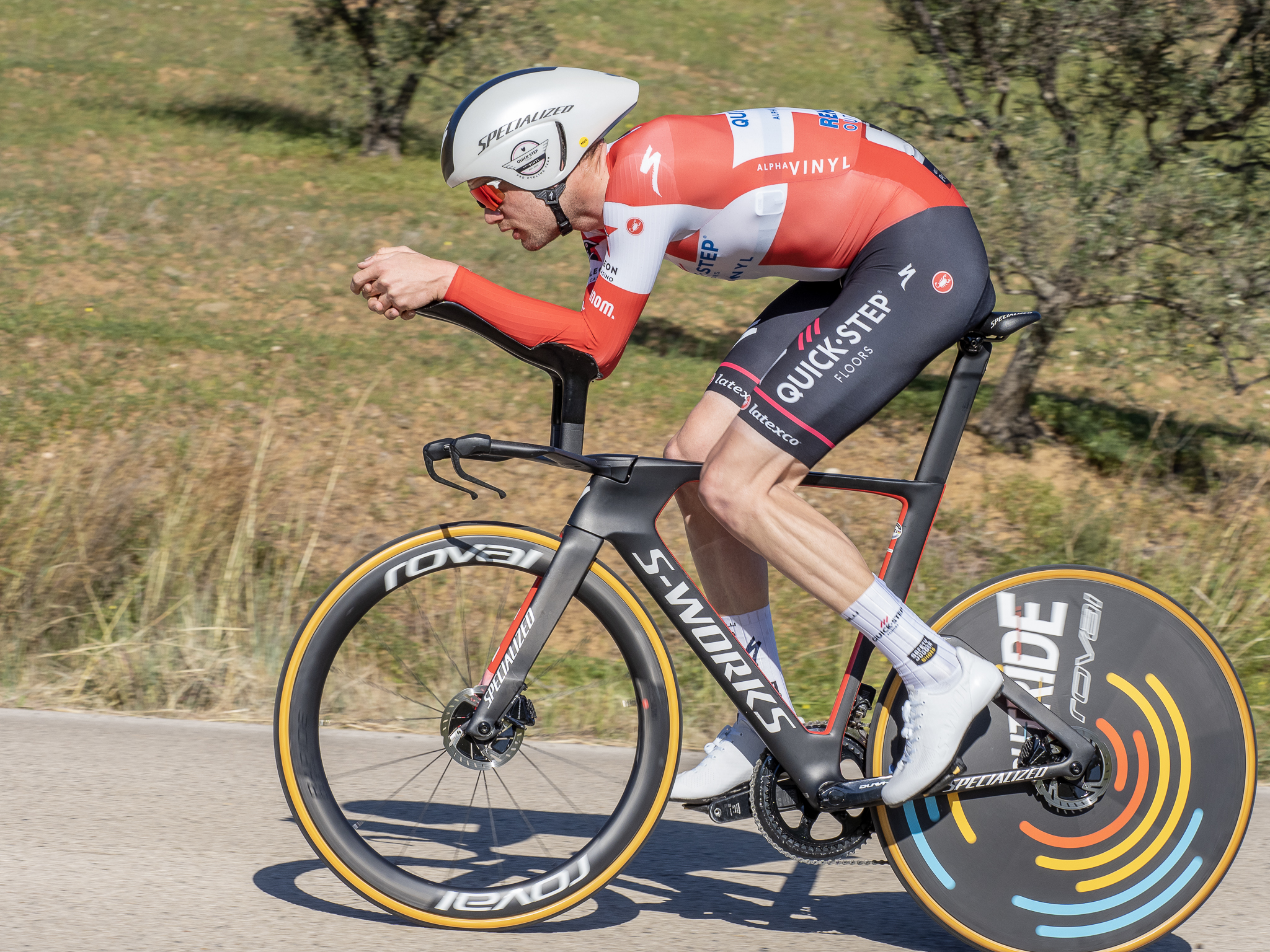
Asgreen at the 2022 Volta ao Algarve

After a 2022 season destroyed by injuries, illness and secondary results, Asgreen was back to winning ways at the Danish National Time Trial Championships in 2023, winning it for the fourth time in five years.

A month later at the 2023 Tour de France, Asgreen won the 18th stage after a 187 km breakaway. Then in the following 19th stage, he placed second, also after a long breakaway, losing to Matej Mohoric by about one inch and thus just barely failing to accomplish the feat of winning two consecutive Tour de France breakaway stages.

Asgreen was selected for the 2026 Tour de France.

== Major results ==
2014
5th Time trial, National Under-23 Road Championships
2016
1st Time trial, National Under-23 Road Championships
3rd Time trial, National Road Championships
3rd GP Viborg
3rd Overall Tour de Berlin
5th Time trial, UCI Road World Under-23 Championships
2017
1st Time trial, UEC European Under-23 Road Championships
1st Time trial, National Under-23 Road Championships
1st GP Viborg
1st Stage 1 Tour de l'Avenir
6th Duo Normand (with Niklas Larsen)
7th Time trial, UCI Road World Under-23 Championships
2018
1st Team time trial, UCI Road World Championships
1st Stage 1 (TTT) Adriatica Ionica Race
2nd Overall Istrian Spring Trophy

1st Stage 1

4th Time trial, National Road Championships
6th Trofeo Laigueglia
2019 (3 pro wins)
National Road Championships

1st Time trial
2nd Road race

1st Stage 3 Deutschland Tour
2nd Time trial, UEC European Road Championships
2nd Tour of Flanders
3rd Overall Tour of California

1st Points classification
1st Stage 2

2020 (3)
National Road Championships

1st Road race
1st Time trial

1st Kuurne–Brussels–Kuurne
6th Time trial, UCI Road World Championships
9th Three Days of Bruges–De Panne
2021 (4)
1st Time trial, National Road Championships
1st Tour of Flanders
1st E3 Saxo Bank Classic
3rd Overall Volta ao Algarve

1st Stage 4 (ITT)

4th Time trial, UCI Road World Championships
4th Druivenkoers Overijse
7th Time trial, Olympic Games
7th Time trial, UEC European Road Championships
2022
3rd Strade Bianche
6th Amstel Gold Race
10th E3 Saxo Bank Classic
2023 (3)
1st Time trial, National Road Championships
1st Stage 18 Tour de France
1st Mountains classification, Volta ao Algarve
2nd Overall Four Days of Dunkirk
6th Overall Okolo Slovenska

1st Stage 5

7th Tour of Flanders
2024
National Road Championships

2nd Road race
2nd Time trial

6th Time trial, UCI Road World Championships
6th Overall Tour of Belgium
8th Time trial, UEC European Road Championships
2025 (1)
1st Stage 14 Giro d'Italia
3rd Time trial, National Road Championships
2026
4th Time trial, National Road Championships
6th Time trial, UEC European Road Championships
8th Time trial, UCI Road World Championships

=== Grand Tour general classification results timeline ===
Grand Tour	2018	2019	2020	2021	2022	2023	2024	2025
Giro d'Italia	—	—	—	—	—	—	—	
Tour de France	—	122	114	64	DNF	87	—	
Vuelta a España	134	—	—	—	—	—	120	

=== Classics results timeline ===
Monument	2018	2019	2020	2021	2022	2023	2024	2025
Milan–San Remo	—	—	72	99	—	36	16	—
Tour of Flanders	—	2	13	1	23	7	47	—
Paris–Roubaix	—	50	NH	68	44	DNF	88	
Liège–Bastogne–Liège	—	—	—	—	—	—	—	—
Giro di Lombardia	DNF	—	—	—	—	—	—	—
Classic	2018	2019	2020	2021	2022	2023	2024	2025
Omloop Het Nieuwsblad	—	—	35	49	76	—	DNF	40
Kuurne–Brussels–Kuurne	—	31	1	34	84	—	88	90
Strade Bianche	—	—	DNF	25	3	—	40	—
E3 Saxo Bank Classic	—	48	NH	1	10	51	77	—
Gent–Wevelgem	—	—	11	—	32	93	54	—
Dwars door Vlaanderen	—	143	NH	30	—	—	—	—
Amstel Gold Race	—	—	—	—	6	—	—	
Grand Prix Cycliste de Québec	—	27	Not held		—	—	—	
Grand Prix Cycliste de Montréal	—	20	Not held		—	—	—	

Legend
—	Did not compete
DNF	Did not finish
NH	Not held
