= Nicolaj Bo Larsen =

Danish cyclist (born 1971)

Personal information
- Full name: Nicolaj Bo Larsen
- Born: 10 November 1971 (age 54) Roskilde, Denmark

Cycling career
- Sport: Cycling
- Current team: Airtox–Carl Ras
- Discipline: Road
- Role: Rider (retired); Directeur sportif

Professional teams
- 1996–1997: Amore & Vita–ForzArcore
- 1998: TVM–Farm Frites
- 1999–2001: home–Jack & Jones
- 2002: Gerolsteiner

Managerial team
- 2021–: Restaurant Suri–Carl Ras

Major wins
- Grand Tours Giro d'Italia 1 individual stage (1996)

Nicolaj Bo Larsen (born 10 November 1971 in Roskilde) is a Danish former professional cyclist, who currently works as a directeur sportif for UCI Continental team Airtox–Carl Ras. He is most notable for winning a stage of the 1996 Giro d'Italia and winning the Danish National Road Race Championships twice.

== Major results ==
1993
1st Stage 2 Milk Race
1994
3rd Road race, National Road Championships
1995
1st Stage 2 Milk Race
3rd Grand Prix Guillaume Tell
1996
1st Stage 17 Giro d'Italia
2nd Giro del Mendrisiotto
1997
1st Road race, National Road Championships
1998
2nd Frankfurt Grand Prix
1999
1st Road race, National Road Championships
1st Fyen Rundt
1st Stage 4 Tour of Sweden
Herald Sun Tour

1st Stages 2 & 10

2nd GP Aarhus
6th Overall Tour Down Under

1st Stage 1

2000
2nd Road race, National Road Championships
3rd USPRO Championship
2001
1st Fyen Rundt
2nd Road race, National Road Championships
2nd Grand Prix d'Ouverture La Marseillaise
2nd Tour du Haut Var
2nd GP Aarhus
