= Audun Fløtten =

Norwegian cyclist

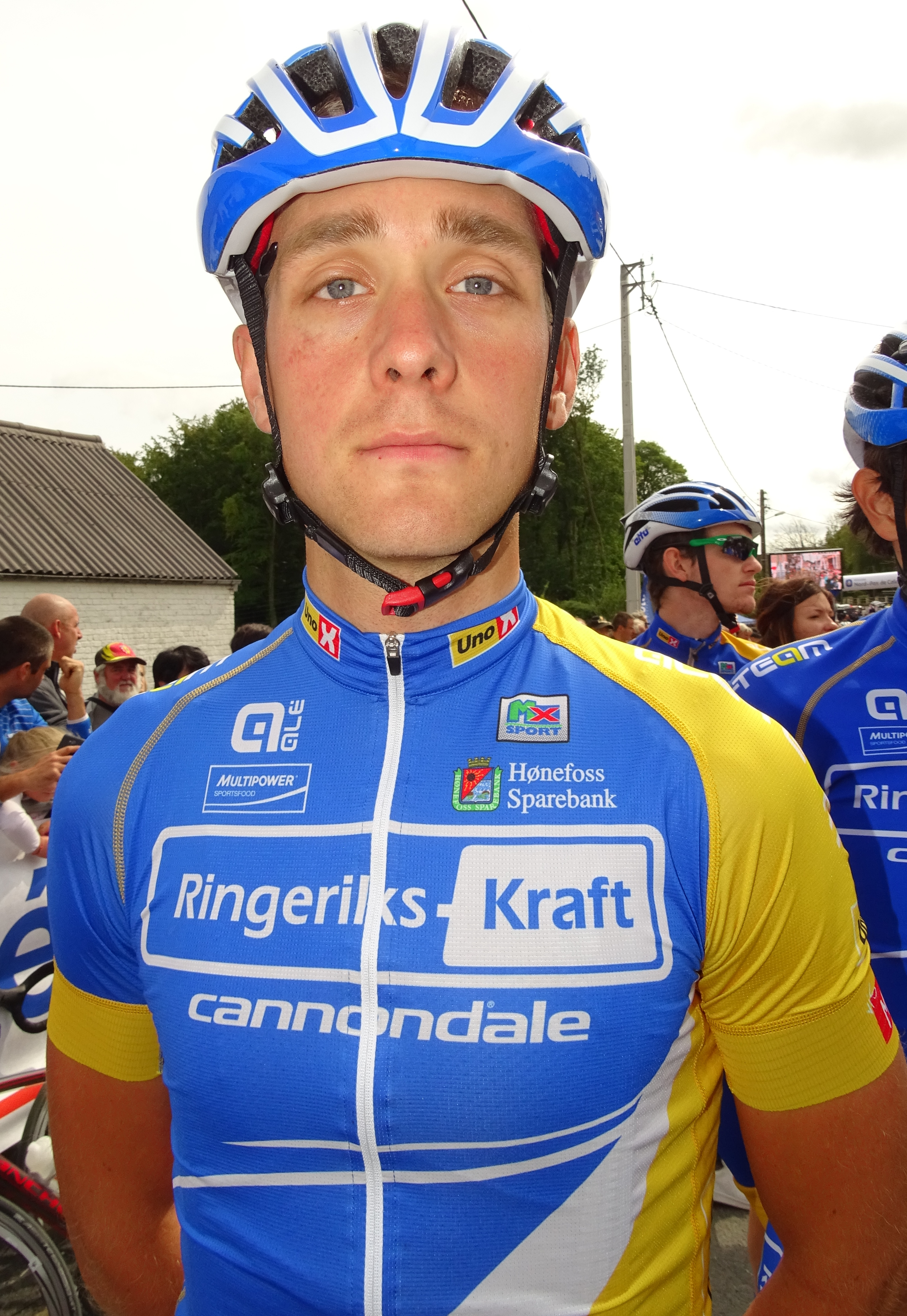

Personal information
- Full name: Audun Brekke Fløtten
- Born: 20 August 1990 (age 36) Åmot, Norway

Cycling career
- Sport: Cycling
- Discipline: Road
- Role: Rider

Professional teams
- 2010–2011: Team Ringeriks–Kraft
- 2012–2013: Joker–Merida
- 2014: Motiv3
- 2015–2017: Team Ringeriks–Kraft
- 2018: Team Virtu Cycling

Audun Brekke Fløtten (born 20 August 1990) is a Norwegian former road cyclist.

== Major results ==
2016
2nd Fyen Rundt
2017
1st Fyen Rundt
2nd Himmerland Rundt
3rd Sundvolden GP
4th GP Horsens
5th Scandinavian Race Uppsala
5th Overall Tour of Rhodes
6th Ringerike GP
6th Skive–Løbet
