= Nicki Sørensen =

Danish cyclist (born 1975)

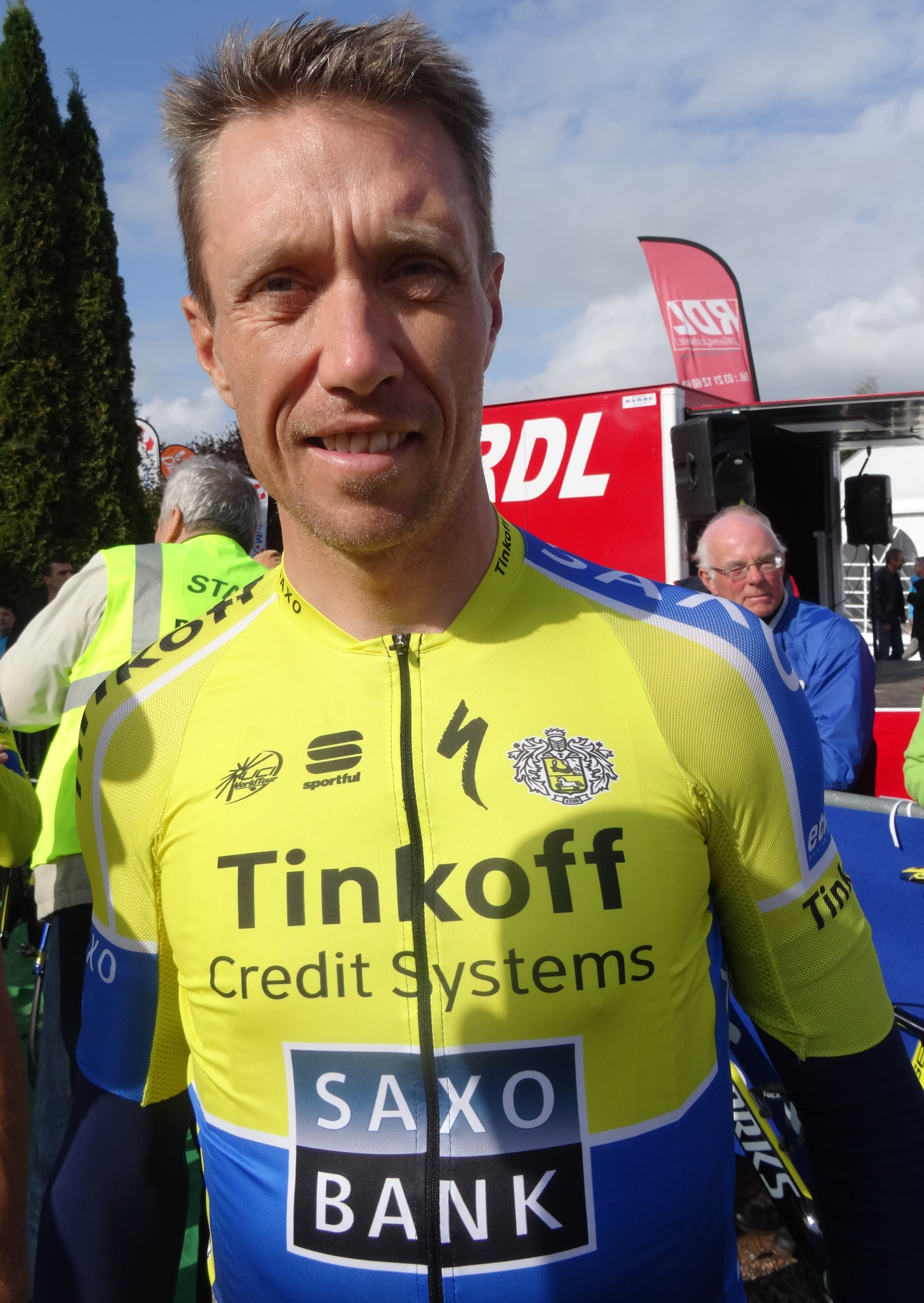
- Sørensen at the 2014 Grand Prix d'Isbergues.

Personal information
- Full name: Nicki Sørensen
- Born: 14 May 1975 (age 51) Hillerød, Denmark
- Height: 1.82 m (6 ft 0 in)
- Weight: 71 kg (157 lb)

Cycling career
- Sport: Cycling
- Discipline: Road
- Role: Rider (retired); Team manager
- Rider type: All-rounder

Professional teams
- 1999: Team Chicky World
- 2000: Team Fakta
- 2001–2014: CSC–Tiscali

Managerial teams
- 2015: Tinkoff–Saxo (directeur sportif)
- 2016: Cycling Academy (directeur sportif)
- 2017–2018: Aqua Blue Sport (directeur sportif)
- 2019–2022: Israel Cycling Academy (directeur sportif)

Major wins
- Grand Tours Tour de France 1 individual stage (2009) Vuelta a España 1 individual stage (2005) One-day races and Classics National Road Race Championships (2003, 2008, 2010, 2011) Gran Premio Bruno Beghelli (2012)

Nicki Sørensen (born 14 May 1975) is a Danish former professional road bicycle racer, and was directeur sportif of UCI Professional Continental team Aqua Blue Sport and NSN Cycling Team. He competed in five consecutive editions of the Tour de France from 2001 to 2005. Riding as an all-round rider who rode well in hilly terrain, Sørensen was a valued support for the team leader without many wins of his own.

== Biography ==
Sørensen only started his cycling career at the age of 19, having been a runner before that. He became a professional road bicycle racer in 1999 for team Team Chicky World. After the team closed down, Sørensen switched to another Denmark-based team, Team Fakta, where he made a good name for himself on the Danish stage as one of the strongest cards of Team Fakta, securing himself a place on the Danish team for the 2000 Olympics.

Before the 2001 season, Sørensen was on the verge of joining British Linda McCartney Racing Team but instead opted to stay in Denmark with Team CSC – World Online, as Team Saxo Bank was then known. In his first year with the team, he participated in the 2001 Tour de France, where he got a taste of success with a fourth place on stage 16. After that, Sørensen was a consistent part of the Tour setup for Team CSC, riding the biggest race in the cycling calendar every year from 2001 to 2005, his highlights including the overall GC rank of 20th in 2002. Another highlight was Sørensen's instrumental role in team captain Tyler Hamilton's win on stage 16 of the 2003 Tour de France when Sørensen, who was in a breakaway, sacrificed his own chances in order to pull Hamilton and thereby allow Tyler Hamilton to conserve the strength needed to win on the day.

Nicki Sørensen started the 2005 season on a high note with a win in GP d'Ouverture la Marseillaise and a fourth place in Tour Méditerranéen during February, and during the season he prolonged his contract with Team CSC until 2007. In September, Nicki Sørensen clinched stage 18 of the Vuelta a España after defeating Pascual Rodriguez in the sprint.

On 16 July 2009, Sørensen won Stage 12 of the 2009 Tour de France. He was in an early breakaway with five other riders and attacked the small group with 20 km to cover to win solo.

Sørensen retired after riding the 2014 Giro di Lombardia. The last victory of his career was the 2012 Gran Premio Bruno Beghelli.

== Team management ==
After his retirement, he remained with Tinkoff–Saxo as a directeur sportif and coach. For the 2016 season he moved across to the Israeli Cycling Academy Team. In October 2016 the new Aqua Blue Sport team announced that Sørensen would join them as a sports director for their inaugural season in 2017. Aqua Blue Sport folded at the end of 2018.

From the beginning of 2019, he joined Israel Cycling Academy as the new sports director. In October 2019 he extended his contract with the team that had just become a UCI World Tour team. In November 2022 it was announced that Sørensen would leave the team at the end of 2022.

== Doping ==
In June 2015, prior to the Anti Doping Denmark report, he admitted to drug use in the early part of his career.

== Major results ==
1999
1st Lemvig Løbet
1st Stage 4 Rheinland-Pfalz Rundfahrt
2000
1st Lemvig-Holstebro-Lemvig
1st Overall Circuit des Mines

1st Stage 1

1st Rund um Hanleite-Erfur
2001
9th Giro del Piemonte
2003
1st Road race, National Road Championships
2005
1st GP d'Ouverture la Marseillaise
1st Stage 18 Vuelta a España
7th Züri-Metzgete
2006
1st Stage 1 (TTT) Vuelta a España
2007
5th Overall Sachsen Tour
5th Overall Danmark Rundt
7th Overall Bayern Rundfahrt
2008
1st Road race, National Road Championships
2009
Tour de France

1st Stage 12
Combativity award Stage 12

1st Stage 2 Danmark Rundt
2010
1st Road race, National Road Championships
2011
1st Road race, National Road Championships
2nd Overall Bayern Rundfahrt
3rd Giro del Friuli
2012
1st Gran Premio Bruno Beghelli
2013
6th Overall Circuit de la Sarthe
