= Raphaël Jeune =

French cyclist

Personal information
- Born: 25 February 1975 (age 51) Besançon, France

Cycling career
- Sport: Cycling
- Current team: Retired
- Discipline: Road
- Role: Rider

Professional team
- 2001–2002: CSC–Tiscali

Raphaël Jeune (born 25 February 1975) is a French former road cyclist.

He rode for Danish professional cycling team CSC–Tiscali. He came to the team as a 'neo-pro' in 2001 and left the team one year later, in 2002.

== Major results ==
2000
1st Stage 7 Circuit des Mines
2001
4th Overall Étoile de Bessèges
