= Bent Pedersen =

Danish cyclist

Personal information
- Born: 24 July 1945 (age 81) Hovedstaden, Denmark

Cycling career
- Sport: Cycling

Bent Pedersen (born 24 July 1945) is a Danish former cyclist. He competed at the 1972 Summer Olympics and 1976 Summer Olympics.
