= Eluf Dalgaard =

Danish cyclist (1929–2004)

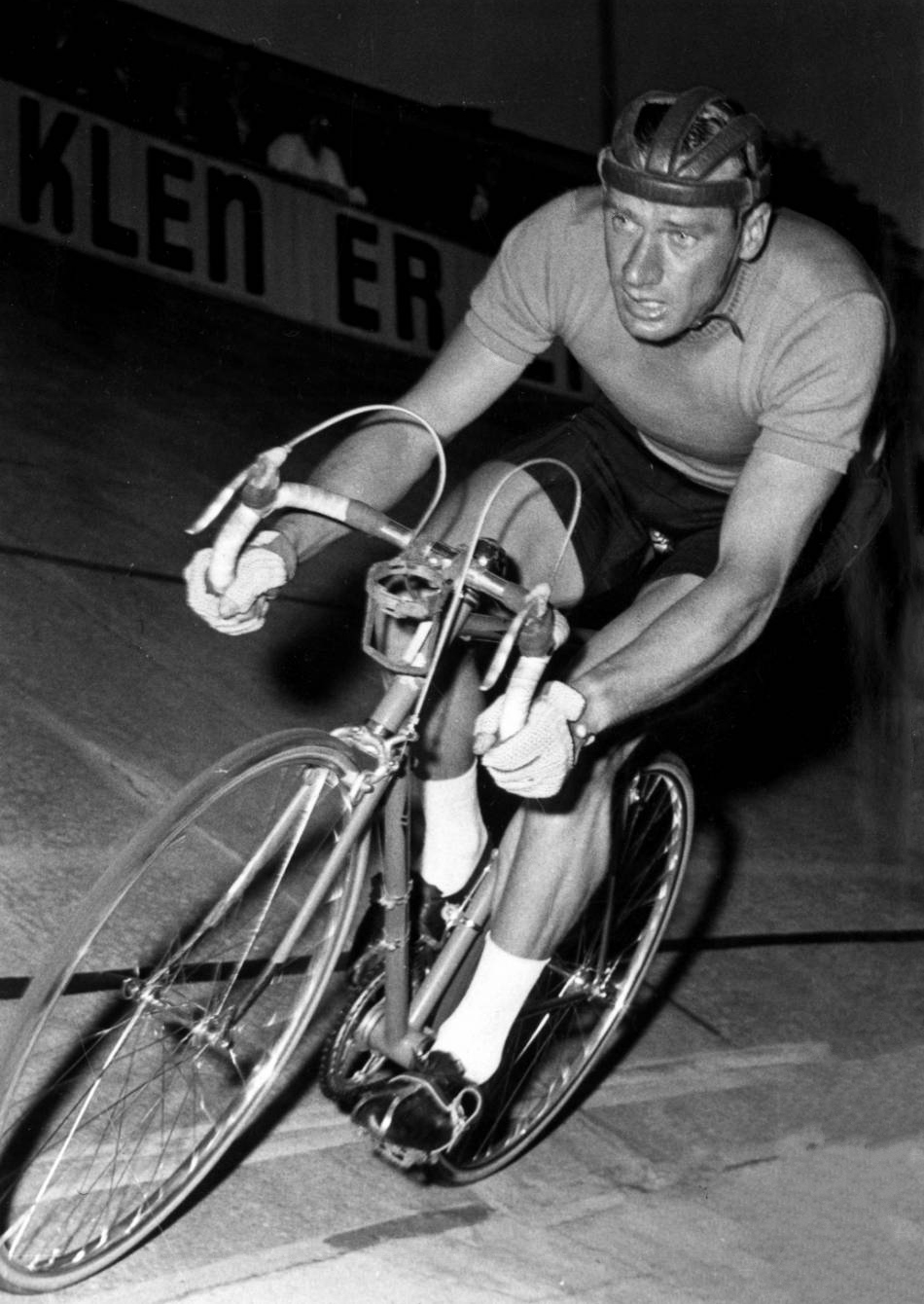
- Eluf Dalgaard in 1952

Personal information
- Born: 26 May 1929 Copenhagen, Denmark
- Died: 12 September 2004 (aged 75)

Sport
- Sport: Cycling
- Event(s): Road, track

Eluf Dalgaard (26 May 1929 – 12 September 2004) was a Danish cyclist who competed both on the road and on track. As an amateur road racer he won the Tour of Sweden in 1952, the Peace Race in 1954, and the Scandinavian Race Uppsala in 1955. In 1957 he turned professional and rode the 1958 Tour de France. On track he won the national pursuit title in 1953 and 1957.
