= Mette Fischer Andreasen =

Danish cyclist

Personal information
- Born: 13 April 1983 (age 43) Denmark

Cycling career
- Sport: Cycling
- Discipline: Road cycling

Mette Fischer Andreasen (born 13 April 1983) is a Danish road cyclist. She represented her nation at the 2005 and 2006 UCI Road World Championships.
