= Fritz Ravn =

Danish cyclist

Personal information
- Born: 13 September 1929
- Died: 28 August 2013 (aged 83)

Cycling career
- Sport: Cycling
- Role: Rider

Fritz Ravn (13 September 1929 – 28 August 2013) was a Danish racing cyclist. He rode in the 1958 Tour de France.
