= Arthur Johansen =

Norwegian footballer (1904-1984)

Personal information
- Date of birth: 13 August 1904
- Date of death: 11 January 1984 (aged 79)

International career
| Years | Team | Apps | (Gls) |
| 1930–1931 | Norway | 3 | (0) |

Arthur Johansen (13 August 1904 – 11 January 1984) was a Norwegian footballer. He played in three matches for the Norway national football team from 1930 to 1931.
