= Christopher Juul-Jensen =

Danish cyclist

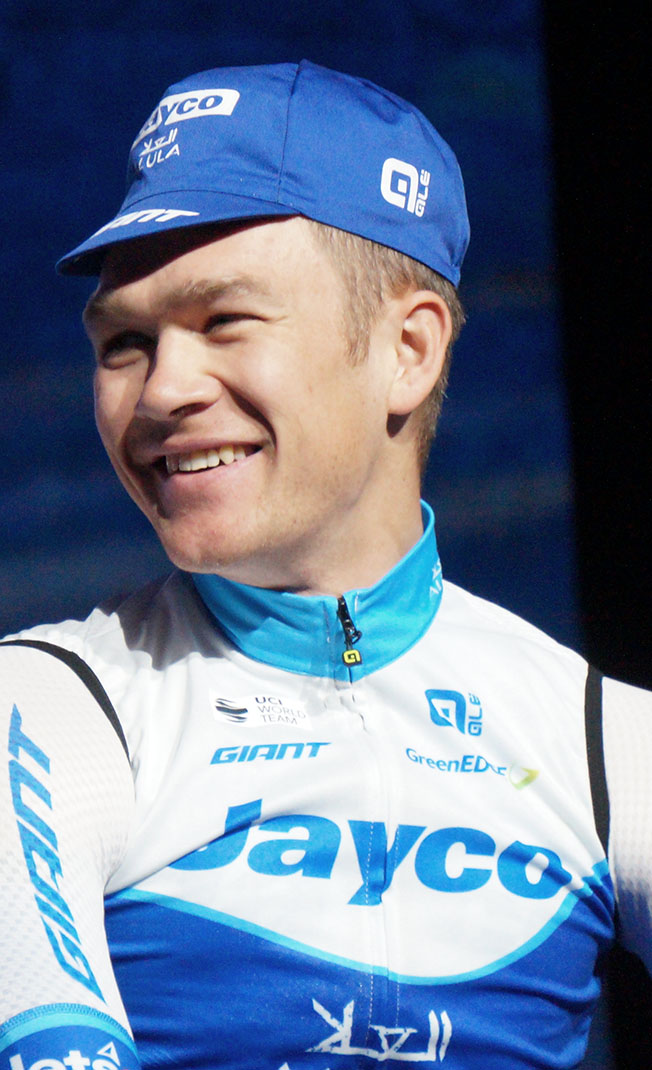
- Juul-Jensen in 2023

Personal information
- Full name: Christopher Juul-Jensen
- Nickname: Joker
- Born: 6 July 1989 (age 37) Kilmacanogue, County Wicklow, Ireland
- Height: 1.83 m (6 ft 0 in)
- Weight: 73 kg (161 lb)

Cycling career
- Sport: Cycling
- Current team: Team Jayco–AlUla
- Discipline: Road
- Role: Rider
- Rider type: Rouleur

Amateur team
- 2008–2011: Glud & Marstrand–Horsens

Professional teams
- 2012–2015: Team Saxo Bank
- 2016–: Orica–GreenEDGE

Major wins
- Stage races Danmark Rundt (2015) One-day races and Classics National Time Trial Championships (2015)

Christopher Juul-Jensen (born 6 July 1989) is a Danish racing cyclist, who currently rides for UCI WorldTeam Team Jayco–AlUla.

Juul-Jensen grew up in Ireland, living in County Wicklow until the age of 16. He became the Danish national time trial champion in 2015. In August 2015 Orica–GreenEDGE announced that they had signed Juul-Jensen on an initial two-year contract from 2016. He was named in the start list for the 2016 Tour de France.

== Major results ==
2007
1st Overall Tour du Pays de Vaud

1st Points classification
1st Stage 3b (ITT)

2009
7th Overall Coupe des nations Ville Saguenay
2010
2nd Road race, National Under-23 Road Championships
6th Overall Coupe des nations Ville Saguenay
8th Liège–Bastogne–Liège Espoirs
9th Overall Giro delle Regioni
2011
1st Overall Coupe des nations Ville Saguenay
2nd Road race, National Under-23 Road Championships
8th Overall Toscana-Terra di Ciclismo
8th Overall Tour de l'Avenir
2012
1st Young rider classification, Paris–Corrèze
2nd Kampioenschap van Vlaanderen
2014
2nd Time trial, National Road Championships
5th Overall Danmark Rundt
6th Overall Tour de Wallonie
10th Japan Cup
2015 (2 pro wins)
1st Time trial, National Road Championships
1st Overall Danmark Rundt
9th Overall Eneco Tour
2016
2nd Japan Cup
5th Overall Tour de Luxembourg
2017
5th Road race, National Road Championships
6th Brabantse Pijl
7th Strade Bianche
7th Vuelta a Murcia
2018 (1)
1st Stage 4 Tour de Suisse
7th Overall Danmark Rundt
8th Overall Settimana Internazionale di Coppi e Bartali
2019
1st Stage 1 (TTT) Tirreno–Adriatico
1st Stage 1 (TTT) Czech Cycling Tour

=== Grand Tour general classification results timeline ===
Grand Tour	2014	2015	2016	2017	2018	2019	2020	2021	2022	2023	2024	2025
Giro d'Italia	100	135	—	109	74	70	—	97	93	—	—	—
Tour de France	—	—	119	—	—	112	99	114	126	117	97	—
Vuelta a España	—	—	—	107	—	—	—	—	—	—	—	110

Legend
—	Did not compete
DNF	Did not finish
