= Team Fakta =

Team information
- UCI code: FAK
- Founded: 1999
- Disbanded: 2003
- Discipline: Road
- Status: Trade Team III (1999); Trade Team II (2000–2002); Trade Team I (2003)
- Bicycles: Pinarello

Team name history
- 1999–2002 2002 2003: Team Fakta; EDS–Fakta; Team Fakta

Team Fakta was a Danish professional road bicycle racing team, which was active in the seasons 1999 to 2003. The main sponsor FDB is a consumer owned grocery chain, whose discount outlets are called Fakta.

Nicki Sørensen was on the team from 2000, Kurt Asle Arvesen and Scott Sunderland from 2001 and Magnus Bäckstedt from 2002.

== Final roster ==
Rider	Date of birth
Allan Bo Andresen (DEN)	February 19, 1973 (aged 29)
Kurt Asle Arvesen (NOR)	February 9, 1975 (aged 27)
Magnus Bäckstedt (SWE)	January 30, 1975 (aged 27)
Lars Bak (DEN)	January 16, 1980 (aged 22)
Thomas Grönqvist (SWE)	October 2, 1975 (aged 27)
Frank Hoj (DEN)	January 4, 1973 (aged 29)
Allan Johansen (DEN)	July 14, 1971 (aged 31)
René Jørgensen (DEN)	July 26, 1975 (aged 27)
Fredrik Modin (SWE)	April 5, 1980 (aged 22)
Bjarke Nielsen (DEN)	February 10, 1976 (aged 26)

Rider	Date of birth
Jorgen Bo Petersen (DEN)	April 11, 1970 (aged 32)
Jacob Moe Rasmussen (DEN)	January 19, 1975 (aged 27)
Michael Reihs (DEN)	April 25, 1979 (aged 23)
Werner Riebenbauer (AUT)	July 7, 1974 (aged 28)
Martin Rittsel (SWE)	March 28, 1971 (aged 31)
Michael Skelde (DEN)	August 13, 1973 (aged 29)
Scott Sunderland (AUS)	November 28, 1966 (aged 36)
Bjørnar Vestøl (NOR)	May 28, 1974 (aged 28)
Julian Winn (GBR)	September 23, 1972 (aged 30)

== Major wins ==
1999
Stage 1a Tour de Langkawi, Lennie Kristensen
2000
Stage 4 Tour de Normandie, Lennie Kristensen
Overall Circuit des Mines, Nicki Sørensen

Stage 1, Nicki Sørensen

Rund um die Hainleite-Erfurt, Nicki Sørensen
Lemvig-Holstebro-Lemvig, Nicki Sørensen
Stage 2 Sachsen-Tour, Morten Sonne
Fyn Rundt, Morten Sonne
2001
Stage 3 Tour of Rhodes, Marcus Ljungqvist
Stage 5 Tour de Normandie, Marcus Ljungqvist
Grand Prix Pino Cerami, Scott Sunderland
Rund um Düren, Bjørnar Vestøl
Overall Tour de Luxembourg, Jorgen Bo Petersen
Norway Time Trial Championships, Kurt Asle Arvesen
Sweden Road Race Championships, Marcus Ljungqvist
Overall Sachsen-Tour, Jorgen Bo Petersen

Stage 2, Morten Sonne
Stage 4a, Jorgen Bo Petersen

Stage 5 Hessen-Rundfahrt, Bjørnar Vestøl
Stage 1 Ster Elektrotoer, Allan Bo Andresen
Grand Prix de Fourmies, Scott Sunderland
Stage 3 Rheinland-Pfalz Rundfahrt, Marcus Ljungqvist
Stage 3 Paris–Corrèze, Jorgen Bo Petersen
Stage 4 Herald Sun Tour, Scott Sunderland
Stage 7a Herald Sun Tour, Kurt Asle Arvesen
2002
GP Fayt-le-Franc, Magnus Bäckstedt
Paris–Camembert, Marcus Ljungqvist
Route Adélie de Vitré, Marcus Ljungqvist
Stage 4 Circuit des Mines, Jorgen Bo Petersen
Overall Tour de Luxembourg, Marcus Ljungqvist

Stage 2, Marcus Ljungqvist

Schynberg-Rundfahrt, Kurt Asle Arvesen
Stage 7 Tour of Austria, Scott Sunderland
Overall Tour of Sweden, Kurt Asle Arvesen
Norway Road Race Championships, Kurt Asle Arvesen
Fyen Rundt, Jacob Moe Rasmussen
Stage 3 Danmark Rundt, Kurt Asle Arvesen
GP Schwarzwald, Jorgen Bo Petersen
Stage 5 Rheinland-Pfalz Rundfahrt, Allan Johansen
Paris–Bourges, Allan Johansen
2003
GP de Villers-Cotterêts, Julian Winn
GP S.A.T.S.-Midtbank, Frank Hoj
Stage 10 Giro d'Italia, Kurt Asle Arvesen
Sweden Time Trial Championships, Magnus Bäckstedt
Fyen Rundt, Jacob Moe Rasmussen
