= Karina Skibby =

Danish cyclist

Personal information
- Full name: Karina Skibby
- Born: 16 July 1965 (age 61) Frederiksberg, Denmark
- Height: 170 cm (5 ft 7 in)
- Weight: 54 kg (119 lb)

Cycling career
- Sport: Cycling
- Discipline: Road cycling
- Role: Rider

Karina Skibby (born 16 June 1965) is a road cyclist from Denmark. She represented her nation at the 1988 Summer Olympics in the women's road race and at the 1992 Summer Olympics in the women's road race.

Her brother is Olympic cyclist Jesper Skibby and her father is Olympic cyclist Willy Skibby.
