= Michael Nielsen (cyclist) =

Danish cyclist

Personal information
- Born: 15 February 1975 (age 51) Køge, Denmark

Cycling career
- Sport: Cycling
- Current team: Retired
- Disciplines: Track, road
- Role: Rider

Professional team
- 1998–2001: home–Jack & Jones

Michael Nielsen (born 15 February 1975) is a Danish cyclist. He competed in the men's team pursuit at the 1996 Summer Olympics.

== Major results ==
1993
National Junior Track Championships

1st Individual pursuit
1st Points race

1995
1st Team pursuit, National Track Championships
1997
1st Road race, National Under-23 Road Championships
1st Fyen Rundt
1998
1st Stage 4a Danmark Rundt
1999
1st Team pursuit, National Track Championships
1st Stage 5 Danmark Rundt
3rd Time trial, National Road Championships
2000
8th Ronde van Midden-Zeeland
