= Lisbeth Simper =

Danish cyclist

Personal information
- Born: 13 January 1978 (age 48) Denmark

Cycling career
- Sport: Cycling
- Discipline: Road cycling

Professional teams
- 1999–2001: Team Lolland-Falster
- 2002–2004: SC Michela Fanini Record Rox

Lisbeth Simper (born 13 January 1978) is a road cyclist from Denmark. She represented her nation at the 1998, 1999, 2000 and 2001 UCI Road World Championships. Between 1999 and 2003 she became 5 times national time trial champion and three times national road race champion of Denmark.
