= Rudolf Rasmussen =

Danish cyclist

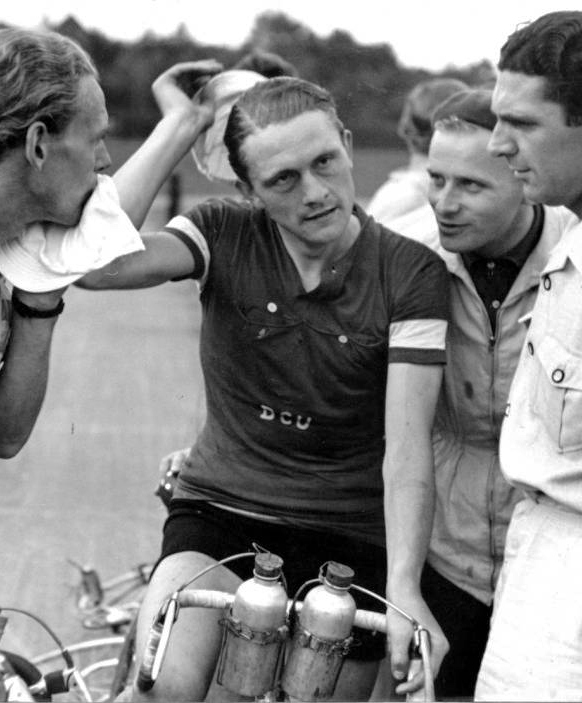
- Rasmussen in 1939

Personal information
- Born: 18 June 1918 Copenhagen, Denmark
- Died: 25 September 1993 (aged 75) Limhamn, Sweden

Cycling career
- Sport: Cycling

Amateur team
- 1938–48: KCK Copenhagen

Rudolf Johannes Rasmussen (18 June 1918 – 25 September 1993) was a Danish cyclist. He competed in the individual and team road race events at the 1948 Summer Olympics, but failed to finish. His younger brother Jørgen Frank Rasmussen took part in the same events at the 1952 Olympics.
