= Team Chicky World =

Team Chicky World was a Danish professional road bicycle racing team, which was active in the seasons 1998 to 1999. The main sponsor Danpo is a Danish producer of poultry products. Chicky World is a brand name of Danpo. Danpo decided not to renew the sponsorship due to the media focus on doping.

Kim Andersen, former yellow jersey rider in Tour de France, was sports director both years. Norwegian Steffen Kjærgaard was the top rider of the team, winning great victories both years including Circuit de la Sarthe (1999), Bayern rundfahrt (1998) and Tour of Normandy (1999). He left the team to join US Postal Service in 2000. Swedish rider Martin Rittsel also won some great victories for the fantastic team including Tour of Argentina.

Michael Sandstød rode for the team in 1998. Nicki Sørensen rode for the team in 1999.
