= Henning Jørgensen =

Danish cyclist

Personal information
- Born: 6 March 1949 (age 77) Midtjylland, Denmark

Cycling career
- Sport: Cycling

Henning Jørgensen (born 6 March 1949) is a Danish former cyclist. He competed at the 1972 Summer Olympics and the 1980 Summer Olympics.
