= Børge Saxil Nielsen =

Danish cyclist

Personal information
- Born: 21 February 1920 Copenhagen, Denmark
- Died: 20 March 1977 (aged 57) Lyngby-Taarbæk, Denmark

Cycling career
- Sport: Cycling

Børge Saxil Nielsen (21 February 1920 – 20 March 1977) was a Danish cyclist. He competed in the individual and team road race events at the 1948 Summer Olympics.
