= Dorte Lohse =

Danish cyclist

Dorte Lohse Rasmussen
Personal information
- Born: 16 March 1971 (age 55) Denmark

Cycling career
- Sport: Cycling
- Discipline: Road cycling

Professional teams
- 2005: Team S.A.T.S.
- 2006: Bianchi Alverti Kookai
- 2007: Menikini-Selle Italia-Gysko
- 2008 (until 31/05): Team Cmax Dila
- 2008 (from 01/06): Team Swift Racing

Dorte Lohse Rasmussen (born 16 March 1971) is a road cyclist from Denmark. She participated at the 2005, 2006, 2007 and 2011 UCI Road World Championships.
