= Christian Müller (cyclist) =

German cyclist (born 1982)

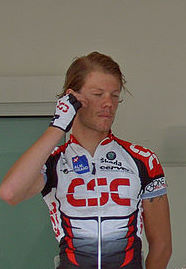

Personal information
- Full name: Christian Müller
- Born: 1 March 1982 (age 44) Erfurt, East Germany
- Height: 1.84 m (6 ft 0 in)
- Weight: 69 kg (152 lb)

Cycling career
- Sport: Cycling
- Discipline: Road
- Role: Rider

Amateur team
- 2004: Wiesenhof (stagiare)

Professional teams
- 2005–2006: Team CSC
- 2007: Skil–Shimano
- 2008: An Post–M.Donnelly–Grant Thornton–Sean Kelly
- 2009: Amore & Vita–McDonald's

Christian Müller (born 1 March 1982) is a professional German road bicycle racer. He was a professional for five years, riding for Team CSC from 2005 to 2006, Skil–Shimano in 2007, An Post–M.Donnelly–Grant Thornton–Sean Kelly in 2008 and Amore & Vita–McDonald's in 2009.

== Wins ==
2004
German ITT Championship, U/23
European ITT Championship, U/23
2005
Stage 5, Sachsen Tour
Stage 5, Tour de l'Avenir
