= Christian Andersen (cyclist) =

Danish cyclist

Personal information
- Born: 18 June 1967 (age 59) Viborg, Denmark

Cycling career
- Sport: Cycling

Christian Foget Andersen (born 18 June 1967) is a Danish former cyclist. He competed in the individual road race at the 1992 Summer Olympics.
