= Maja Adamsen =

Danish cyclist

Personal information
- Full name: Maja Watt Adamsen
- Born: 7 September 1978 (age 48) Munkebo, Denmark

Cycling career
- Sport: Cycling
- Discipline: Road cycling

Professional teams
- 2007–2008 (until 17/06): Team Cmax Dila
- 2008 (from 17/06): Team Pro Féminin Les Carroz

Maja Watt Adamsen (born 7 September 1978) is a road cyclist from Denmark. She represented her nation at the 2005, 2007 and 2008 UCI Road World Championships.
