= Verner Blaudzun =

Danish cyclist

Personal information
- Born: 23 March 1946 (age 80) Sønderborg, Syddanmark, Denmark

Cycling career
- Sport: Cycling
Medal record
Men's cycling
Representing Denmark
Olympic Games
Bronze medal – third place	1976 Montreal	Team time trial

Verner Blaudzun (born 23 March 1946) is a Danish former cyclist who represented Denmark at the Summer Olympics. He won the bronze medal in the men's team time trial at the 1976 Montreal Olympics held in Canada, alongside Gert Frank, Jørgen Hansen and Jørn Lund.

He came fourth in the same even at the 1968 Olympics, and came 42nd 4 years later in the 1980 men's road race.

Blaudzun's son, Michael, was a professional road bicycle racer who was twice Denmark's national road racing champion and 3 times national time trial champion. He retired after the 2008 season.

The Dutch singer-songwriter and bicycle racing enthusiast Johannes Sigmond chose 'Blaudzun' as his stage name.
