= Christian Pedersen (cyclist) =

Danish cyclist

Personal information
- Born: 7 September 1920 Horsens, Denmark
- Died: 24 November 1999 (aged 79) Hovedstaden, Denmark

Cycling career
- Sport: Cycling

Christian Pedersen (17 September 1920 – 24 November 1999) was a Danish cyclist. He competed in the individual and team road race events at the 1948 Summer Olympics.
