= Allan Johansen =

Danish road bicycle racer

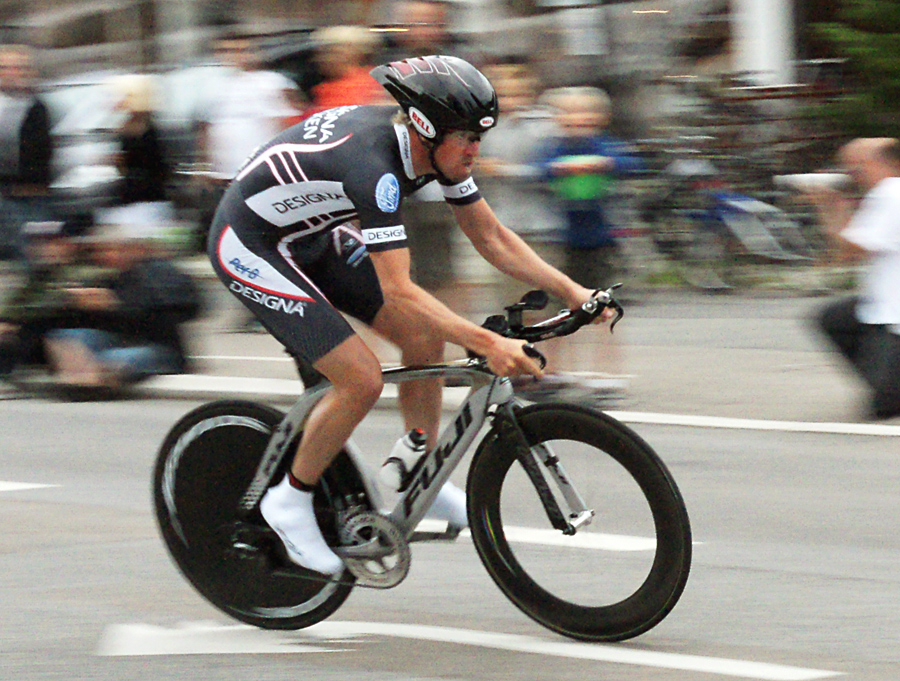
- Johansen at the 2009 Danmark Rundt

Personal information
- Full name: Allan Johansen
- Born: 14 July 1971 (age 55) Silkeborg, Denmark
- Height: 1.88 m (6 ft 2 in)
- Weight: 78 kg (172 lb)

Cycling career
- Sport: Cycling
- Discipline: Road
- Role: Rider

Professional teams
- 1998–1999: Team Chicky World
- 2000: Memory Card–Jack & Jones
- 2001–2003: Team Fakta
- 2004: BankGiroLoterij
- 2005–2007: Team CSC
- 2008–2009: Team Designa Køkken

Major wins
- National Road Race Championship (2006)

Allan Johansen (born 14 July 1971) is a Danish former professional road bicycle racer.

== Career ==
He became professional in 1998 for Team Chicky World, before moving to Memory Card–Jack & Jones (later known as Team CSC) in 2000. Johansen continued at Team Fakta from 2001 to 2003 then to BankGiroLoterij in 2004, before returning to Team CSC in 2005, where remained until the end of 2007. In 2008 he joined Team Designa Køkken. Johansen retired in 2009 ending his career with the 2009 Danmark Rundt when he was awarded the fighters award for the race. He rode in the 2000 Tour de France, and finished 119th overall. He also finished 125th in the 2005 Vuelta a España.

== Major results ==
1997
8th Grand Prix Herning
1998
4th Overall Tour de Normandie
7th Grand Prix Herning
1999
1st BKI Grand Prix
1st Rund um Düren
1st Stage 1 Sachsen Tour
1st Stage 1 Hessen Rundfahrt
2001
9th GP de Denain
2002
1st Paris–Bourges
1st Stage 5 Rheinland-Pfalz Rundfahrt
2nd Schaal Sels
2nd GP Aarhus
4th Grote Prijs Jef Scherens
5th Overall Tour de Picardie
8th GP de Denain
2003
2nd Road race, National Road Championships
10th GP Aarhus
2004
1st GP Jef Scherens
1st Hel van Het Mergelland
3rd Paris–Brussels
3rd GP Aarhus
5th Overall Circuit Franco-Belge
7th Veenendaal–Veenendaal
2005
1st Stage 4 Sachsen Tour
7th Wachovia Invitational
2006
National Road Championships

1st Road race
3rd Time trial

1st GP Herning
3rd Overall Tour de Luxembourg

1st Stage 1

2007
4th Grand Prix Herning
5th E3 Harelbeke
2008
1st GP Copenhagen
5th Dwars door Vlaanderen
8th Omloop Het Volk
8th Rogaland Grand Prix
10th Tour of Flanders
2009
1st Stage 4 Rhône-Alpes Isère Tour
3rd Grand Prix Herning
4th GP Bikebuster
4th Overall Boucle de l'Artois
6th Overall Danmark Rundt
8th Overall Ronde de l'Oise

1st Stage 4
