= Helle Sørensen =

Danish cyclist

Personal information
- Born: 22 May 1963 (age 63) Ringsted, Denmark

Cycling career
- Sport: Cycling

Helle Sørensen (born 22 May 1963) is a Danish former cyclist. She competed in the women's road race event at the 1984 Summer Olympics.
