= Jacob Moe Rasmussen =

Danish cyclist (born 1975)

Personal information
- Born: 19 January 1975 (age 51) Amager, Denmark

Cycling career
- Sport: Cycling
- Current team: Retired
- Discipline: Road
- Role: Rider

Professional teams
- 1999: Acceptcard Pro Cycling
- 2000–2001: Memory Card–Jack & Jones
- 2002–2003: Team Fakta
- 2004–2008: Team PH

Jacob Moe Rasmussen (born 19 January 1975 in Amager) is a Danish former cyclist.

== Major results ==
1999
1st Stage 2 Vuelta a la Argentina
3rd National Road Race Championships
2000
3rd Overall Guldensporentweedaagse
2004
1st Stage 3 Ringerike GP
2005
1st Colliers Classic
2006
1st Overall Tour du Loir-et-Cher

1st Stages 3, 4 & 5

1st Stages 4 & 5 Ringerike GP
2nd Overall Olympia's Tour
2nd National Road Race Championships
2nd National Time Trial Championships
2007
2nd National Road Race Championships
2008
1st National Team Time Trial Championships
1st National Team Pursuit Championships
