= Per Pedersen (cyclist) =

Danish cyclist

Personal information
- Full name: Per Pedersen
- Born: 5 April 1964 (age 62) Vestervig, Denmark

Cycling career
- Sport: Cycling
- Discipline: Road
- Role: Rider

Professional teams
- 1986–1990: R.M.O.
- 1991–1993: Amaya Seguros

Per Pedersen (born 5 April 1964) is a retired road bicycle racer from Denmark, who was a professional rider from 1986 to 1993. He competed in four Tours de France (1989, 1991, 1992 and 1993). He also competed in the individual road race event at the 1984 Summer Olympics.

Today he runs a bicycle shop near Herning, Denmark. After his career he admitted he used cortisone during his career. Cortisone was allowed at the time but has later been classified as doping.

== Teams ==
- 1986: R.M.O. (France)
- 1987: R.M.O. (France)
- 1988: R.M.O. (France)
- 1989: R.M.O. (France)
- 1990: R.M.O. (France)
- 1991: Amaya Seguros (Spain)
- 1991: Varta - Elk - Nö (Austria, from 12 June to 16 June)
- 1992: Amaya Seguros (Spain)
- 1993: Amaya Seguros (Spain)
