= Eigil Sørensen =

Danish cyclist

Personal information
- Born: 24 June 1948 (age 78) Syddanmark, Denmark

Cycling career
- Sport: Cycling

Eigil Sørensen (born 24 June 1948) is a Danish former cyclist. He represented his country in the individual road race at the 1972 Summer Olympics; 1975 UCI Road World Championships and 1977 UCI Road World Championships. He was also a cyclo-cross cyclist competing at the world championships in 1969 and 1970. He also competed in among others the Tour de l'Avenir and Grand Prix Tell.
