= Colliers Classic =

Race details
- Date: Late-April, Early-May
- Region: Aarhus, Denmark
- English name: Colliers Classic
- Local name(s): Colliers Classic (in Danish)
- Discipline: Road
- Competition: UCI Europe Tour
- Type: Single-day

History
- First edition: 1997
- Editions: 11 (as of 2007)
- Final edition: 2007
- First winner: Bjarne Riis (DEN)
- Final winner: Juan José Haedo (ARG)

Colliers Classic (also known as Grand Prix Aarhus) is a semi classic European bicycle race held in Aarhus, Denmark. Since 2005, the race has been organised as a 1.1 event on the UCI Europe Tour.

== Name of the race ==
- 1997–1999 : Grand Prix Aarhus
- 2000–2001 : Samsung Mobile Grand Prix
- 2002–2005 : CSC Classic
- Since 2006 : Colliers Classic

== Winners ==
Year	Country	Rider	Team
1997	Denmark	Bjarne Riis	
1998	Latvia	Romāns Vainšteins	
1999	Denmark	Allan Johansen	
2000	Latvia	Arvis Piziks	
2001	Denmark	Michael Sandstød	
2002	France	Laurent Jalabert	
2003	Denmark	Jakob Piil	
2004	Norway	Kurt-Asle Arvesen	
2005	Denmark	Jacob Moe Rasmussen	
2006	Belgium	Erwin Thijs	
2007	Argentina	Juan José Haedo	
