= Thomas Bruun Eriksen =

Danish professional road bicycle racer

Personal information
- Full name: Thomas Bruun Eriksen
- Born: 13 February 1979 (age 47)

Cycling career
- Sport: Cycling
- Current team: Retired
- Discipline: Road
- Role: Rider

Amateur teams
- ?: Hedehusene/Fløng CK
- ?: Roskilde CC
- ?: Team Bornholm
- 2001: Team CSC (stagiaire)
- 2006-: Team Mermaid

Professional team
- 2002-2005: Team CSC

Thomas Bruun Eriksen (born 13 February 1979) was a Danish professional road bicycle racer who ended his career after the 2005 UCI ProTour season.

After riding for Danish amateur outfit Team Bornholm, Bruun Eriksen first joined professional outfit Team CSC as a stagiaire in the second half of the 2001 season. Here he secured a professional contract for the 2002 and 2003 seasons and following a glimpse of potential in the 2002 Paris–Roubaix as well as two wins in 2003, stage 5 of the Peace Race, and stage 3 of Tour of Rhodes, Thomas Bruun Eriksen prolonged his contract until the 2005 season.

During 2005, Bruun Eriksen decided to retire from professional bicycle racing at age of 26, citing a desire to use the education he got before turning professional as the reason. In a January 2006 radio interview, Bruun Eriksen said that during the Tour de Pologne in September 2005, he had told team manager Bjarne Riis of his decision to retire, as he did not like living alone in Spain, far from Denmark, and had lost his motivation. He returned to live in Tølløse in Denmark.

In January 2006, Bruun Eriksen found the motivation to ride once again, and he agreed to return to ride for the amateurs of Team Bornholm, now under the name "Team Mermaid", but without any desire to race professionally again.

== Major results ==
2003
Stage 5, Peace Race
Stage 3 and 3rd Overall, Tour of Rhodes
4th, Stage 14, Vuelta a España
2005
5th, CSC Classic
