= 2011 Saxo Bank–SunGard season =

2011 Saxo Bank–SunGard season
Manager	Bjarne Riis
One-day victories	3
Stage race overall victories	none (Note: Alberto Contador's 2011 results were expunged in February 2012.)
Stage race stage victories	5 (Note: Richie Porte gained a stage victory from Alberto Contador's disqualification.)
Previous season • Next season

The 2011 season for Saxo Bank–SunGard began in January with the Tour Down Under and ended in October with Baden Cooke's participation in the Noosa Grand Prix. As a UCI ProTeam, they were automatically invited and obligated to send a squad to every event in the UCI World Tour.

The team's ridership changed drastically after the 2010 season. Two of its leaders in past seasons, Andy and Fränk Schleck, departed for the newly formed Leopard Trek, along with several other riders. The team notably added three-time Tour de France champion Alberto Contador and three of his helpers from the 2010 Astana team, while his doping case stemming from the 2010 Tour de France remained unresolved until February 2012, where he was given a backdated two-year ban. As well as his results from that race, all of his results from 2011 were disqualified, including his victory in the Giro d'Italia. From the squad's 2011 total, Contador vacated six stage victories and three overall stage race victories, along with four sub-classification triumphs.

== 2011 roster ==
Ages as of January 1, 2011.

Rider	Date of birth
Jonathan Bellis (GBR)	August 16, 1988 (aged 22)
Manuele Boaro (ITA)	December 3, 1987 (aged 23)
Mads Christensen (DEN)	April 6, 1984 (aged 26)
Alberto Contador (ESP)	December 6, 1982 (aged 28)
Baden Cooke (AUS)	October 12, 1978 (aged 32)
Laurent Didier (LUX)	July 19, 1984 (aged 26)
Volodymir Gustov (UKR)	February 15, 1977 (aged 33)
Juan José Haedo (ARG)	January 26, 1981 (aged 29)
Sebastian Haedo (ARG)	April 18, 1983 (aged 27)
Jesús Hernández (ESP)	September 28, 1981 (aged 29)
Jonas Aaen Jørgensen (DEN)	April 20, 1986 (aged 24)
Kasper Klostergaard (DEN)	May 22, 1983 (aged 27)
Gustav Larsson (SWE)	September 20, 1980 (aged 30)
Jarosław Marycz (POL)	April 17, 1987 (aged 23)

Rider	Date of birth
Rafał Majka (Note: Majka and Roberts joined the team on February 24) (POL)	September 12, 1989 (aged 21)
Ran Margaliot (Note: Margaliot joined the team on August 1 as a stagiaire.) (ISR)	July 18, 1988 (aged 22)
Michael Mørkøv (DEN)	April 30, 1985 (aged 25)
Daniel Navarro (ESP)	July 8, 1983 (aged 27)
Benjamín Noval (ESP)	January 23, 1979 (aged 31)
Nick Nuyens (BEL)	May 5, 1980 (aged 30)
Richie Porte (AUS)	January 30, 1985 (aged 25)
Luke Roberts (AUS)	January 25, 1977 (aged 33)
Chris Anker Sørensen (DEN)	September 5, 1984 (aged 26)
Nicki Sørensen (DEN)	May 14, 1975 (aged 35)
André Steensen (DEN)	October 12, 1987 (aged 23)
David Tanner (AUS)	September 30, 1984 (aged 26)
Matteo Tosatto (ITA)	May 14, 1974 (aged 36)
Brian Vandborg (DEN)	December 4, 1981 (aged 29)

Riders who joined the team for the 2011 season

Rider	2010 team
Manuele Boaro	neo-pro
Mads Christensen	Glud & Marstrand-LRØ Rådgivning
Alberto Contador	Astana
Volodymir Gustov	Cervélo TestTeam
Jesús Hernández	Astana
Rafał Majka	neo-pro
Daniel Navarro	Astana
Benjamín Noval	Astana
Nick Nuyens	Rabobank
Luke Roberts	Team Milram
David Tanner	Fly V Australia
Matteo Tosatto	Quick-Step
Brian Vandborg	Liquigas–Doimo

Riders who left the team during or after the 2010 season

Rider	2011 team
Matti Breschel	Rabobank
Fabian Cancellara	Leopard Trek
Jakob Fuglsang	Leopard Trek
Frank Høj	Retired
Dominic Klemme	Leopard Trek
Anders Lund	Leopard Trek
Stuart O'Grady	Leopard Trek
Alex Rasmussen	HTC–Highroad
Andy Schleck	Leopard Trek
Fränk Schleck	Leopard Trek
Jens Voigt	Leopard Trek

== One-day races ==
=== Spring classics ===
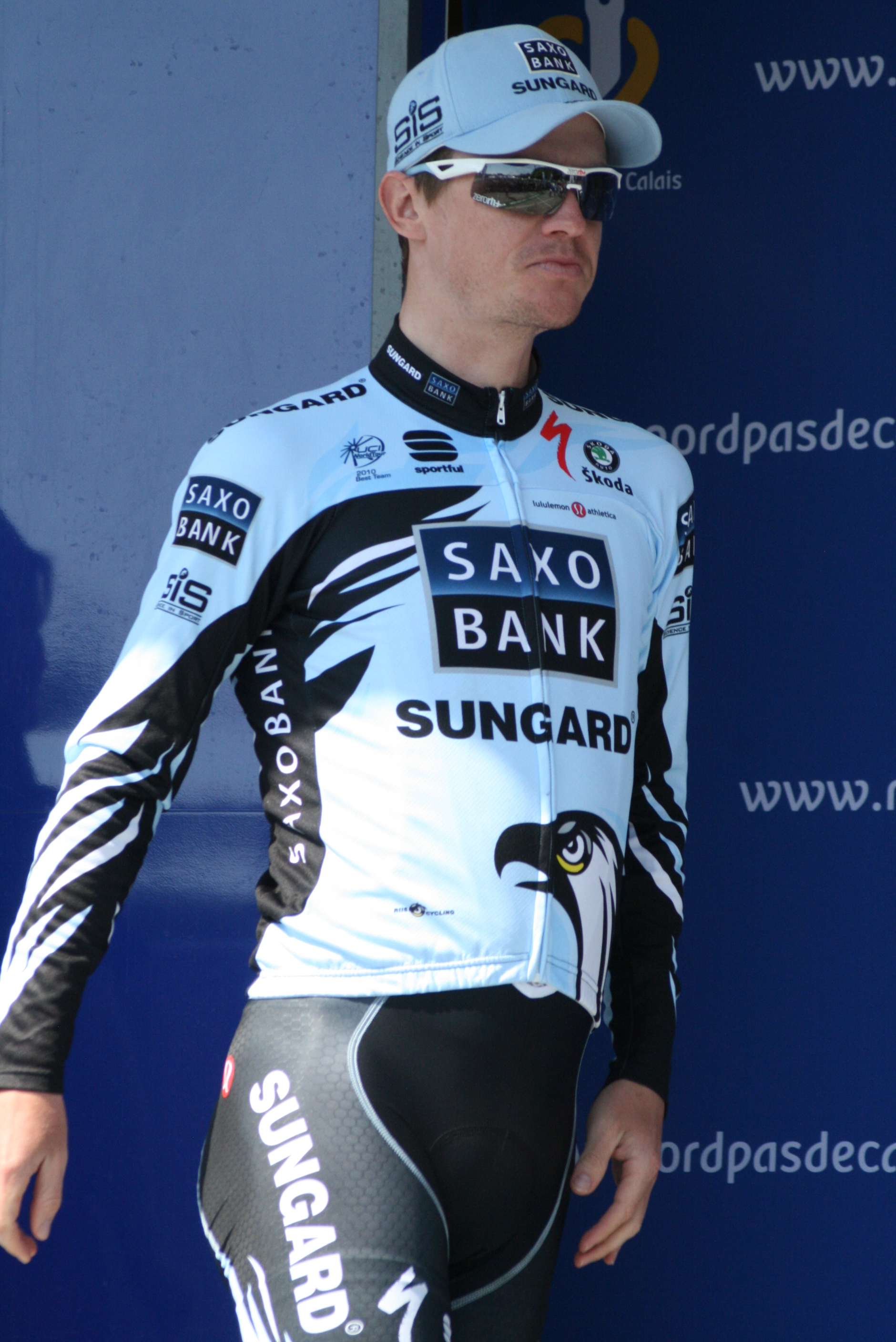
Nick Nuyens (pictured here later in the season at the Four Days of Dunkirk event) won two single-day races in the Flanders region of Belgium, including the monument classic the Tour of Flanders.

New acquisition Nuyens took the team's first one-day win of the season at Dwars door Vlaanderen. After several chase groups attempting to catch the morning breakaway were subsequently caught by the peloton, Nuyens and Team Sky's Geraint Thomas caught up with the last two 20 km (12 mi) from the finish line. They eventually dropped both, and contested the win between themselves despite nearly being caught in turn. Nuyens and Thomas never had more than 20 seconds' advantage, and no appreciable time gap at the finish, but Nuyens just managed to hang on for the win. Nuyens' win made him a pre-race contender at the monument classic the Tour of Flanders, though he was not seen as a true favorite ahead of riders like Fabian Cancellara and Tom Boonen. Nuyens rode a largely defensive race. One photographer remarked after the race that he had not taken any pictures of Nuyens until he and Sylvain Chavanel bridged up to an attack by Cancellara on the Bosberg, the eighteenth and final cobbled climb on the day's parcours. He had been gapped off on the Kwaremont, but made a bridge back to the leading group along with Stijn Devolder. As he had much of the day, Nuyens stayed within the slipstreams of the other riders to the finish. Cancellara led out the sprint, but Nuyens maneuvered around him at the finish, taking the biggest win of his career. Riis praised Nuyens' ride after the race, but also admitted that the Belgian had been a bit lucky to win. Cancellara, for his part, blasted Nuyens and the other riders in the race for riding, as Cancellara saw it, only to ensure that he did not win.

Cooke was the team's leader at the third monument classic, Paris–Roubaix, the first time the veteran Aussie had ever held such a mantle. He did not expect to contend for victory, but was confident of a top-ten placing. Cooke ended up having a difficult race, crashing twice and breaking his shoe after the second impact. His team car brought him a new bike, but they were not at first aware that he needed a new cleat, so he rode for several kilometers with one foot bare. This effectively ended his race, and he finished in 22nd place, almost four minutes behind the winner Johan Vansummeren. Riis nonetheless praised his team's efforts, saying the support riders had rallied well around Cooke, but the Aussie sprinter's bad luck had doomed his chances.

The team also sent squads to the Classic Loire Atlantique, Milan–San Remo, Cholet-Pays de Loire, the E3 Prijs Vlaanderen – Harelbeke, the Scheldeprijs, the Amstel Gold Race, La Flèche Wallonne, Gullegem Koerse and Halle–Ingooigem, but placed no higher than 11th in any of these races.

=== Fall races ===
The team also sent squads to the Grand Prix José Dubois, the Clásica de San Sebastián, the Vattenfall Cyclassics, the GP Ouest-France, the Grand Prix Cycliste de Québec, Paris–Brussels, the Grand Prix de Fourmies, the Grand Prix Cycliste de Montréal, the Grand Prix de Wallonie, the Giro dell'Emilia, the Grand Prix Bruno Beghelli, the Giro di Lombardia, the Japan Cup and the Noosa Grand Prix, but finished no higher than 12th in any of these races.

== Stage races ==
Contador returned to racing after being reinstated from a provisional doping suspension at the Volta ao Algarve, an event where he was the defending champion. He finished fourth overall, having slipped from second in the final day's time trial, bettered in both the time trial and the overall standings by HTC–Highroad's Tony Martin. Contador got back to his winning ways at the Vuelta a Murcia in March. He finished safely in the bunch in a flat but difficult stage 1, one where several overall contenders lost time. He won the hillier second stage, being the first up the Alto del Collado Bermejo and beating Denis Menchov and Saur–Sojasun's Jérôme Coppel by five seconds on the descent to the finish line. He also won the stage 3 time trial, by eight seconds over Coppel and 12 over Menchov, and the three finished in those same positions on the final podium. Since the Vuelta a Murcia overlapped with Paris–Nice by a day, Contador did not defend his championship at that event. At Tirreno–Adriatico, J. J. Haedo won stage 3 ahead of race leader Tyler Farrar, as Farrar had been forced to sprint from a long way out after an early leadout from world champion Thor Hushovd. The Argentinian timed his sprint just right and took an easy win. Contador won the queen stage of the Volta a Catalunya in March, last shedding former teammate Levi Leipheimer on the ascent to Vallnord in Andorra. The other stages all ended in group sprints, meaning Contador's 23-second time gap attained in Andorra was sufficient to win him the race overall.

Contador entered the Vuelta a Castilla y León as the defending champion and winner of three of the last four editions of the race, but he came in having battled a cold over the two days previous to the event and with his Court of Arbitration for Sport looming in the near future. He said it would be difficult to ensure victory since the race's one summit finish was not especially difficult, and its time trial was short, at only 11.2 km (7.0 mi) in length. Contador finished with the first group on the road in the first two flat stages, occupying ninth place before the race's one mountain stage, ending at the Laguna de los Peces. However, in stage 3, mechanical trouble struck the Spaniard. Gapped off on the stage-concluding ascent, he finished nearly three minutes behind the stage winner, ending any chance at overall victory. Contador rebounded to win the stage 4 time trial, with teammate Porte coming the closest to him at one second back, but finished just 24th overall.

Chris Anker Sørensen also won the mountains classification for the team at the Tour de Romandie. The team also sent squads to the Tour Down Under, the Tour Méditerranéen, Tour du Haut Var, Paris–Nice, the Tour of the Basque Country, the Tour of Turkey, the Four Days of Dunkirk, the Tour of California, the Critérium du Dauphiné, the Tour de Suisse, the Tour of Slovenia, the Tour of Austria, the Tour de Pologne, the Eneco Tour, the USA Pro Cycling Challenge, the Tour de Wallonie-Picarde and the Tour of Beijing, but did not achieve a stage win, classification win, or podium finish in any of them.

== Grand Tours ==
=== Giro d'Italia ===
Alberto Contador won the Overall classification for Saxo Bank-SunGard in 2011.

== Away from competition ==
=== Ongoing resolution of Alberto Contador clenbuterol case ===
While riding for Astana in the 2010 Tour de France, Contador tested positive for clenbuterol, a bronchodilator and stimulant specifically banned by UCI anti-doping rules. Due in large part to the tiny amount of the substance present in his urine sample, 50 picograms per milliliter, Contador believed the positive was the result of eating contaminated beef. While the result was discovered in August, and Contador was informed shortly thereafter, it did not become public knowledge until late September, a point at which Contador had already been announced as signing for Saxo Bank–SunGard for the 2011 season. Though provisionally suspended with immediate effect by the UCI, he attended the team's first training camp in December, still unsure what his status for the 2011 season would be. After months of deliberation, the Spanish cycling federation handed Contador a formal one-year suspension on January 26. Two days later, he announced his intention to appeal, and this appeal was accepted; the Spanish federation went back on their own decision and on February 15 cleared Contador of any wrongdoing. He was cleared to return to competition immediately, and started the Volta ao Algarve the next day, finishing fourth.

On March 24, the UCI confirmed that they would appeal the ruling to the Court of Arbitration for Sport, feeling that the highest legal body should hear the case. They waited the maximum amount of time possible before announcing their appeal. The World Anti-Doping Agency decided on March 29 to appeal separately the Spanish federation's decision. The appeal casts doubt on Contador's potential presence in the 2011 Tour de France, as a member of the court stated that he is pessimistic that the case will be decided before July.

It was not until February 2012 that the case was resolved, when Contador was given a two-year backdated ban and was stripped of both his 2010 Tour de France win for Astana, and his 2011 Giro d'Italia win for Saxo Bank–SunGard.

== Season victories ==
Date	Race	Competition	Rider	Country	Location
March 11	Tirreno–Adriatico, Stage 3	UCI World Tour	Juan José Haedo (ARG)	Italy	Perugia
March 23	Dwars door Vlaanderen	UCI Europe Tour	Nick Nuyens (BEL)	Belgium	Waregem
April 3	Tour of Flanders	UCI World Tour	Nick Nuyens (BEL)	Belgium	Ninove
April 16	Vuelta a Castilla y León, Stage 4	UCI Europe Tour	Richie Porte (AUS)	Spain	Zamora
May 1	Tour de Romandie, Mountains classification	UCI World Tour	Chris Anker Sørensen (DEN)	Switzerland	
June 17	Ster ZLM Toer, Stage 3	UCI Europe Tour	Juan José Haedo (ARG)	Netherlands	Schimmert
August 5	Tour of Denmark, Stage 5	UCI Europe Tour	Richie Porte (AUS)	Denmark	Helsingør
September 6	Vuelta a España, Stage 16	UCI World Tour	Juan José Haedo (ARG)	Spain	Haro
September 18	Grand Prix d'Isbergues	UCI Europe Tour	Jonas Aaen Jørgensen (DEN)	France	Isbergues

=== Victories originally obtained by Contador but vacated ===
Date	Race	Competition	Country	Location
March 5	Vuelta a Murcia, Stage 2	UCI Europe Tour	Spain	Sierra Espuña
March 6	Vuelta a Murcia, Stage 3	UCI Europe Tour	Spain	Murcia
March 6	Vuelta a Murcia, Overall	UCI Europe Tour	Spain	
March 6	Vuelta a Murcia, Points classification	UCI Europe Tour	Spain	
March 23	Volta a Catalunya, Stage 3	UCI World Tour	Andorra	Vallnord
March 27	Volta a Catalunya, Overall	UCI World Tour	Spain	
April 16	Vuelta a Castilla y León, Stage 4	UCI Europe Tour	Spain	Zamora
May 15	Giro d'Italia, Stage 9	UCI World Tour	Italy	Etna
May 24	Giro d'Italia, Stage 16	UCI World Tour	Italy	Nevegal
May 29	Giro d'Italia, Overall	UCI World Tour	Italy	
May 29	Giro d'Italia, Points classification	UCI World Tour	Italy	
May 29	Giro d'Italia, Azzurri d'Italia classification	UCI World Tour	Italy	
May 29	Giro d'Italia, Combativity classification	UCI World Tour	Italy	
