= 2013 Saxo–Tinkoff season =

2013 Saxo–Tinkoff season
| Manager | Bjarne Riis |
| One-day victories | 2 |
| Stage race overall victories | – |
| Stage race stage victories | 5 |
Previous season • Next season

The 2013 season for Saxo–Tinkoff began in January with the Tour Down Under. As a UCI ProTeam, they were automatically invited and obligated to send a squad to every event in the UCI World Tour.

On 25 June 2012, it was announced that the Russian Tinkoff Bank would join the team as co-sponsors for the rest of the 2012 season and through to the end of 2013. Saxo Bank also renewed their sponsorship through 2013, with the team's name thus becoming Saxo-Tinkoff.

== 2013 roster ==
As of 6 August 2013.

| Rider | Date of birth |
|---|---|
| Daniele Bennati (ITA) | 24 September 1980 (age 44) |
| Manuele Boaro (ITA) | 3 December 1987 (age 37) |
| Matti Breschel (DEN) | 31 August 1984 (age 40) |
| Jonathan Cantwell (AUS) | 8 January 1982 (age 43) |
| Mads Christensen (DEN) | 6 April 1984 (age 41) |
| Alberto Contador (ESP) | 6 December 1982 (age 42) |
| Timmy Duggan (USA) | 14 November 1982 (age 42) |
| Jesper Hansen (Note: Hansen joined the team on 5 August as a stagiaire, from Team Cult Energy.) (DEN) | 4 May 1991 (aged 21) |
| Jonas Aaen Jørgensen (DEN) | 20 April 1986 (age 39) |
| Christopher Juul-Jensen (DEN) | 6 July 1989 (age 35) |
| Roman Kreuziger (CZE) | 6 May 1986 (age 38) |
| Karsten Kroon (NED) | 29 January 1976 (age 49) |
| Marko Kump (SLO) | 9 September 1988 (age 36) |
| Anders Lund (DEN) | 14 February 1985 (age 40) |
| Rafał Majka (POL) | 12 September 1989 (age 35) |
| Jay McCarthy (AUS) | 8 September 1992 (age 32) |

| Rider | Date of birth |
|---|---|
| Takashi Miyazawa (JPN) | 27 February 1978 (age 47) |
| Michael Mørkøv (DEN) | 30 April 1985 (age 40) |
| Benjamín Noval (ESP) | 23 January 1979 (age 46) |
| Sérgio Paulinho (POR) | 26 March 1980 (age 45) |
| Evgeni Petrov (RUS) | 25 May 1978 (age 46) |
| Bruno Pires (POR) | 15 May 1981 (age 43) |
| Paweł Poljański (Note: Poljański joined the team on 1 August as a stagiaire, from Team Mocaiana.) (POL) | 6 May 1990 (aged 22) |
| Jesús Hernández (ESP) | 28 September 1981 (age 43) |
| Nicolas Roche (IRL) | 3 July 1984 (age 40) |
| Michael Rogers (AUS) | 20 December 1979 (age 45) |
| Chris Anker Sørensen (DEN) | 5 September 1984 (age 40) |
| Nicki Sørensen (DEN) | 14 May 1975 (age 49) |
| Rory Sutherland (AUS) | 8 February 1982 (age 43) |
| Matteo Tosatto (ITA) | 14 May 1974 (age 50) |
| Oliver Zaugg (SUI) | 9 May 1981 (age 43) |

Riders who joined the team for the 2013 season

| Rider | 2012 team |
|---|---|
| Daniele Bennati | RadioShack–Nissan |
| Matti Breschel | Rabobank |
| Timmy Duggan | Liquigas–Cannondale |
| Roman Kreuziger | Astana |
| Marko Kump | Adria Mobil |
| Jay McCarthy | Jayco-AIS |
| Evgeni Petrov | Astana |
| Nicolas Roche | Ag2r–La Mondiale |
| Michael Rogers | Team Sky |
| Rory Sutherland | UnitedHealthcare |
| Oliver Zaugg | RadioShack–Nissan |

Riders who left the team during or after the 2012 season

| Rider | 2013 team |
|---|---|
| Volodymir Gustov | |
| Juan José Haedo | Jamis–Hagens Berman |
| Lucas Sebastián Haedo | Cannondale |
| Kasper Klostergaard | Concordia Forsikring–Riwal |
| Ran Margaliot | |
| Jarosław Marycz | CCC–Polsat–Polkowice |
| Daniel Navarro | Cofidis |
| Nick Nuyens | Garmin–Sharp |
| Luke Roberts | Stölting-Ruhr |
| David Tanner | Blanco Pro Cycling |
| Troels Vinther | Team Cult Energy |

== Season victories ==
| Date | Race | Competition | Rider | Country | Location |
|---|---|---|---|---|---|
| 26 January | Tour de San Luis, Stage 6 | UCI America Tour | Alberto Contador (ESP) | Argentina | Mirador del Sol |
| 17 February | Volta ao Algarve, Mountains classification | UCI Europe Tour | Manuele Boaro (ITA) | Portugal | |
| 12 March | Tirreno–Adriatico, Points classification | UCI World Tour | Alberto Contador (ESP) | Italy | |
| 5 April | Circuit de la Sarthe, Teams classification | UCI Europe Tour | (Note: The riders on the squad were Karsten Kroon, Jay McCarthy, Mads Christensen, Nicki Sørensen, Rory Sutherland, and Takashi Miyazawa) | France | |
| 14 April | Amstel Gold Race | UCI World Tour | Roman Kreuziger (CZE) | Netherlands | Valkenburg |
| 21 July | Tour de France, Teams classification | UCI World Tour | (Note: The riders on the squad were Alberto Contador, Daniele Bennati, Jesús Hernández, Roman Kreuziger, Benjamín Noval, Sérgio Paulinho, Nicolas Roche, Michael Rogers, and Matteo Tosatto) | France | |
| 1 August | Danmark Rundt, Stage 2 | UCI Europe Tour | Matti Breschel (DEN) | Denmark | Sønderborg |
| 2 August | Danmark Rundt, Stage 3 | UCI Europe Tour | Matti Breschel (DEN) | Denmark | Vejle |
| 3 August | Tour de Pologne, Points classification | UCI World Tour | Rafał Majka (POL) | Poland | |
| 25 August | Vuelta a España, Stage 2 | UCI World Tour | Nicolas Roche (IRL) | Spain | Baiona–Alto do Monte da Groba |
| 29 August | Vuelta a España, Stage 6 | UCI World Tour | Michael Mørkøv (DEN) | Spain | Cáceres |
| 20 October | Japan Cup | UCI Asia Tour | Michael Rogers (AUS) | Japan | Utsunomiya |
