= 2012 Saxo Bank–Tinkoff Bank season =

2012 Saxo Bank–Tinkoff Bank season
Manager	Bjarne Riis
One-day victories	5
Stage race overall victories	1
Stage race stage victories	4 (Note: Two stage victories for Contador were expunged in February.)
Previous season • Next season

The 2012 season for Saxo Bank–Tinkoff Bank began in January with the Tour Down Under. As a UCI ProTeam, they were automatically invited and obligated to send a squad to every event in the UCI World Tour.

In February 2012, Alberto Contador was given a backdated two-year ban in relation to his doping case stemming from the 2010 Tour de France. As well as his results from that race, all of his results from 2011 and 2012 were disqualified, including his victory in the 2011 Giro d'Italia.

Known simply as Team Saxo Bank for the first six months of 2012, the team acquired Tinkoff Bank as a secondary title sponsor shortly before the Tour de France.

== 2012 roster ==
Ages as of 1 January 2012.

Rider	Date of birth
Manuele Boaro (ITA)	3 December 1987 (aged 24)
Jonathan Cantwell (AUS)	8 January 1982 (aged 29)
Mads Christensen (DEN)	6 April 1984 (aged 27)
Alberto Contador (Note: Contador's contract was annulled on 7 February, after receiving a backdated two-year ban in relation to a positive test for clenbuterol at the 2010 Tour de France. He rejoined the team on 5 August, ahead of the Eneco Tour.) (ESP)	6 December 1982 (aged 29)
Volodymir Gustov (UKR)	15 February 1977 (aged 34)
Juan José Haedo (ARG)	26 January 1981 (aged 30)
Lucas Sebastián Haedo (ARG)	18 April 1983 (aged 28)
Jesús Hernández (ESP)	28 September 1981 (aged 30)
Jonas Aaen Jørgensen (DEN)	20 April 1986 (aged 25)
Christopher Juul-Jensen (DEN)	6 July 1989 (aged 22)
Kasper Klostergaard (DEN)	22 May 1983 (aged 28)
Karsten Kroon (NED)	29 January 1976 (aged 35)
Anders Lund (DEN)	14 February 1985 (aged 26)
Rafał Majka (POL)	12 September 1989 (aged 22)

Rider	Date of birth
Ran Margaliot (ISR)	18 July 1988 (aged 23)
Jarosław Marycz (POL)	17 April 1987 (aged 24)
Takashi Miyazawa (JPN)	27 February 1978 (aged 33)
Michael Mørkøv (DEN)	30 April 1985 (aged 26)
Daniel Navarro (ESP)	8 July 1983 (aged 28)
Benjamín Noval (ESP)	23 January 1979 (aged 32)
Nick Nuyens (BEL)	5 May 1980 (aged 31)
Sérgio Paulinho (POR)	26 March 1980 (aged 31)
Bruno Pires (POR)	15 May 1981 (aged 30)
Luke Roberts (AUS)	25 January 1977 (aged 34)
Chris Anker Sørensen (DEN)	5 September 1984 (aged 27)
Nicki Sørensen (DEN)	14 May 1975 (aged 36)
David Tanner (AUS)	30 September 1984 (aged 27)
Matteo Tosatto (ITA)	14 May 1974 (aged 37)
Troels Vinther (DEN)	24 February 1987 (aged 24)

Riders who joined the team for the 2012 season

Rider	2011 team
Christopher Juul-Jensen	neo-pro (Glud & Marstrand–LRØ)
Troels Vinther	neo-pro (Team Capinordic)
Sérgio Paulinho	Team RadioShack
Ran Margaliot	stagiaire (Saxo Bank–SunGard)
Karsten Kroon	BMC Racing Team
Bruno Pires	Leopard Trek
Anders Lund	Leopard Trek
Takashi Miyazawa	Farnese Vini–Neri Sottoli
Jonathan Cantwell	Fly V Australia

Riders who left the team during or after the 2011 season

Rider	2012 team
Baden Cooke	GreenEDGE
Richie Porte	Team Sky
Laurent Didier	RadioShack–Nissan
Gustav Larsson	Vacansoleil–DCM
Jonathan Bellis	An Post–Sean Kelly
André Steensen	Glud & Marstrand–LRØ
Brian Vandborg	SpiderTech–C10

== Season victories ==
Date	Race	Competition	Rider	Country	Location
12 February	Tour Méditerranéen, Teams classification	UCI Europe Tour	(Note: The riders on the squad were Benjamín Noval, Daniel Navarro, David Tanner, Luke Roberts, Mads Christensen, Nicki Sørensen, Rafał Majka and Chris Anker Sørensen)	France	
13 March	Tour de Taiwan, Stage 4	UCI Asia Tour	Jonathan Cantwell (AUS)	Taiwan	Taichung
16 March	Tour de Taiwan, Stage 7	UCI Asia Tour	Jonathan Cantwell (AUS)	Taiwan	Kaohsiung
25 March	Volta a Catalunya, Mountains classification	UCI World Tour	Chris Anker Sørensen (DEN)	Spain	
7 April	Tour of the Basque Country, Mountains classification	UCI World Tour	Mads Christensen (DEN)	Spain	
12 April	Grand Prix de Denain	UCI Europe Tour	Juan José Haedo (ARG)	France	Denain
13 May	Post Cup Ringsted	National event	Michael Mørkøv (DEN)	Denmark	Ringsted
22 July	Tour de France, Super-combativity award	UCI World Tour	Chris Anker Sørensen (DEN)	France	
2 August	Paris–Corrèze, Young rider classification	UCI Europe Tour	Christopher Juul-Jensen (DEN)	France	
2 August	Paris–Corrèze, Teams classification	UCI Europe Tour	(Note: The riders on the squad were David Tanner, Christopher Juul-Jensen, Jonas Aaen Jørgensen, Kasper Klostergaard, Luke Roberts, Manuele Boaro, Jonathan Cantwell and Troels Vinther)	France	
9 August	Tour de l'Ain, Stage 3	UCI Europe Tour	Daniel Navarro (ESP)	France	Montréal-la-Cluse
11 August	Tour de l'Ain, Teams classification	UCI Europe Tour	(Note: The riders on the squad were Juan José Haedo, Volodymir Gustov, Lucas Sebastián Haedo, Daniel Navarro, Jesús Hernández, Mads Christensen and Rafał Majka)	France	
12 August	Post Cup Roskilde	National event	Michael Mørkøv (DEN)	Denmark	Roskilde
5 September	Vuelta a España, Stage 17	UCI World Tour	Alberto Contador (ESP)	Spain	Fuente Dé
9 September	Vuelta a España, Overall	UCI World Tour	Alberto Contador (ESP)	Spain	
9 September	Vuelta a España, Super-combativity award	UCI World Tour	Alberto Contador (ESP)	Spain	
26 September	Milano–Torino	UCI Europe Tour	Alberto Contador (ESP)	Italy	Turin
7 October	Gran Premio Bruno Beghelli	UCI Europe Tour	Nicki Sørensen (DEN)	Italy	Monteveglio
13 October	Tour of Beijing, Young rider classification	UCI World Tour	Rafał Majka (POL)	China	

=== Victories originally obtained by Contador but vacated ===
Date	Race	Competition	Country	Location
25 January	Tour de San Luis, Stage 3	UCI America Tour	Argentina	Mirador del Portero
27 January	Tour de San Luis, Stage 5	UCI America Tour	Argentina	Mirador del Sol
