= 2014 Tinkoff–Saxo season =

Tinkoff–Saxo
- 2014 season
- Manager: Bjarne Riis

Season victories
- One-day races: –
- Stage race overall: 6
- Stage race stages: 18

The 2014 season for Tinkoff–Saxo began in January with the Tour Down Under. As a UCI ProTeam, they were automatically invited and obligated to send a squad to every event in the UCI World Tour.

Oleg Tinkov bought Saxo–Tinkoff from Bjarne Riis and will be the main sponsor for the squad for the next three years. The team will be known as Tinkoff–Saxo in 2014 with Danish Saxo Bank becoming the second sponsor.

== 2014 roster ==
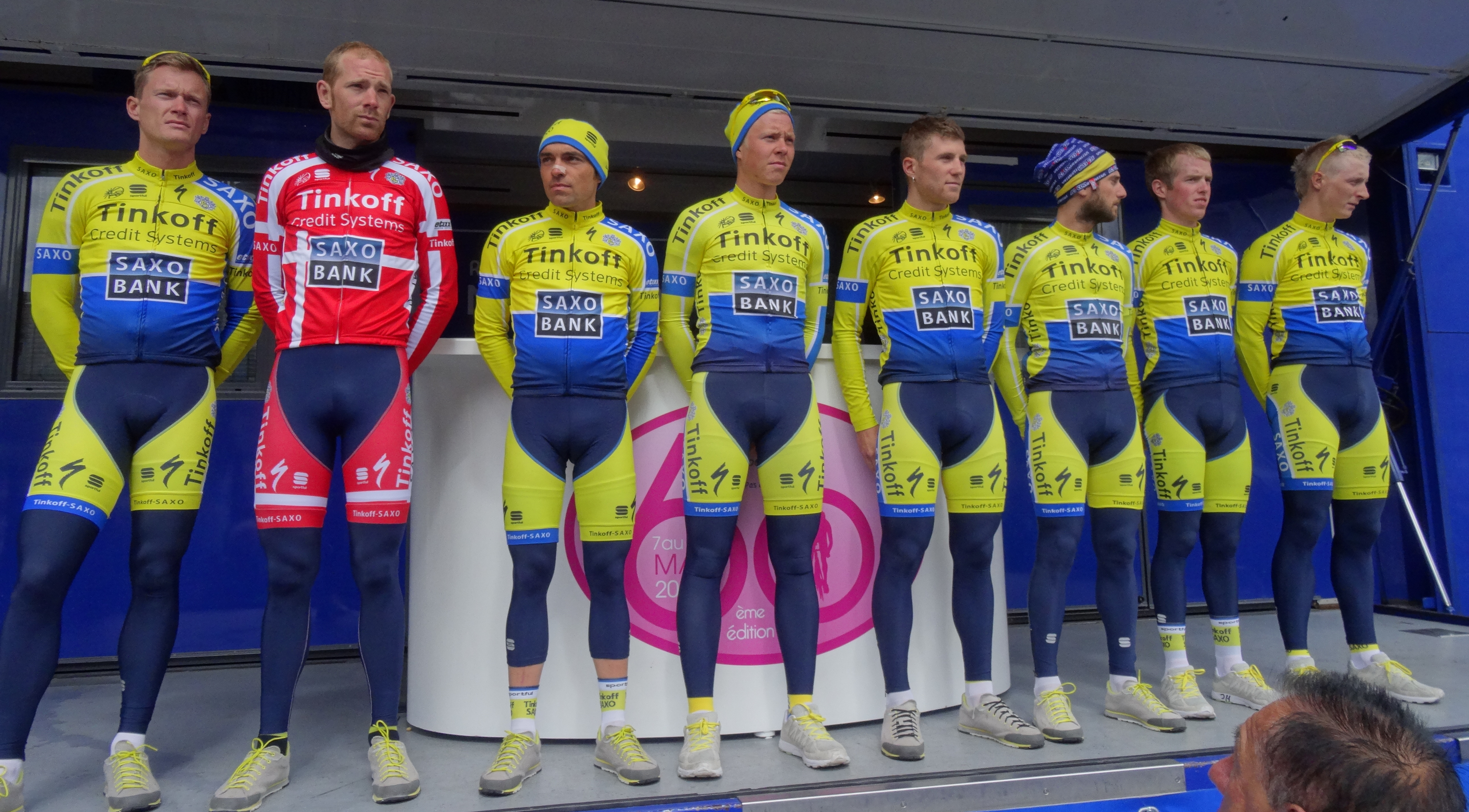
Members of the team at the Four Days of Dunkirk.

As of 11 March 2014.

Rider	Date of birth
Edward Beltrán (Note: Beltrán joined the team on 4 March, from the Nankang–Fondriest team.) (COL)	18 January 1990 (aged 23)
Daniele Bennati (ITA)	24 September 1980 (aged 33)
Manuele Boaro (ITA)	3 December 1987 (aged 26)
Matti Breschel (DEN)	31 August 1984 (aged 29)
Alberto Contador (ESP)	6 December 1982 (aged 31)
Jesper Hansen (DEN)	4 May 1991 (aged 22)
Jesús Hernández (ESP)	28 September 1981 (aged 32)
Christopher Juul-Jensen (DEN)	6 July 1989 (aged 24)
Michael Kolář (SVK)	21 December 1992 (aged 21)
Roman Kreuziger (CZE)	6 May 1986 (aged 27)
Karsten Kroon (NED)	29 January 1976 (aged 37)
Marko Kump (SLO)	9 September 1988 (aged 25)
Rafał Majka (POL)	12 September 1989 (aged 24)
Jay McCarthy (AUS)	8 September 1992 (aged 21)
Michael Mørkøv (DEN)	30 April 1985 (aged 28)

Rider	Date of birth
Sérgio Paulinho (POR)	26 March 1980 (aged 33)
Evgeni Petrov (RUS)	25 May 1978 (aged 35)
Bruno Pires (POR)	15 May 1981 (aged 32)
Paweł Poljański (POL)	6 May 1990 (aged 23)
Nicolas Roche (IRL)	3 July 1984 (aged 29)
Michael Rogers (AUS)	20 December 1979 (aged 34)
Ivan Rovny (RUS)	30 September 1987 (aged 26)
Chris Anker Sørensen (DEN)	5 September 1984 (aged 29)
Nicki Sørensen (DEN)	14 May 1975 (aged 38)
Rory Sutherland (AUS)	8 February 1982 (aged 31)
Matteo Tosatto (ITA)	14 May 1974 (aged 39)
Nikolay Trusov (RUS)	2 July 1985 (aged 28)
Michael Valgren (DEN)	7 February 1992 (aged 21)
Oliver Zaugg (SUI)	9 May 1981 (aged 32)

Riders who joined the team for the 2014 season

Rider	2013 team
Jesper Hansen	neo-pro (Team Cult Energy)
Michael Kolář	neo-pro (Dukla Trenčín)
Paweł Poljański	neo-pro
Ivan Rovny	Ceramica Flaminia–Fondriest
Nikolay Trusov	Cycling Team De Rijke–Shanks
Michael Valgren	neo-pro (Team Cult Energy)

Riders who left the team during or after the 2013 season

Rider	2014 team
Jonathan Cantwell	Drapac Professional Cycling
Mads Christensen	Cult Energy–Vital Water
Timmy Duggan	Retired
Jonas Aaen Jørgensen	Riwal Cycling Team
Anders Lund	Retired
Takashi Miyazawa	Vini Fantini–Nippo
Benjamín Noval	Retired

== Season victories ==
Date	Race	Competition	Rider	Country	Location
22 February	Volta ao Algarve, Stage 4	UCI Europe Tour	Alberto Contador (ESP)	Portugal	Loulé–Alto do Malhão
15 March	Tirreno–Adriatico, Stage 4	UCI World Tour	Alberto Contador (ESP)	Italy	Cittareale
16 March	Tirreno–Adriatico, Stage 5	UCI World Tour	Alberto Contador (ESP)	Italy	Guardiagrele
18 March	Tirreno–Adriatico, Overall	UCI World Tour	Alberto Contador (ESP)	Italy	
30 March	Critérium International, Young rider classification	UCI Europe Tour	Rafał Majka (POL)	France	
7 April	Tour of the Basque Country, Stage 1	UCI World Tour	Alberto Contador (ESP)	Spain	Ordizia
12 April	Tour of the Basque Country, Overall	UCI World Tour	Alberto Contador (ESP)	Spain	
21 May	Giro d'Italia, Stage 11	UCI World Tour	Michael Rogers (AUS)	Italy	Savona
25 May	Tour of Norway, Young rider classification	UCI Europe Tour	Jesper Hansen (DEN)	Norway	
31 May	Giro d'Italia, Stage 20	UCI World Tour	Michael Rogers (AUS)	Italy	Monte Zoncolan
6 June	Tour de Luxembourg, Stage 2	UCI Europe Tour	Matti Breschel (DEN)	Luxembourg	Schifflange
7 June	Tour de Luxembourg, Stage 3	UCI Europe Tour	Matti Breschel (DEN)	Luxembourg	Differdange
8 June	Tour de Luxembourg, Overall	UCI Europe Tour	Matti Breschel (DEN)	Luxembourg	
8 June	Tour de Luxembourg, Points classification	UCI Europe Tour	Matti Breschel (DEN)	Luxembourg	
8 June	Tour de Luxembourg, Teams classification	UCI Europe Tour	(Note: The riders on the squad were Manuele Boaro, Matti Breschel, Michael Kolář, Marko Kump, Michael Mørkøv, Ivan Rovny, Nikolay Trusov and Oliver Zaugg)	Luxembourg	
21 June	Route du Sud, Stage 2	UCI Europe Tour	Nicolas Roche (IRL)	France	Val-Louron
22 June	Route du Sud, Overall	UCI Europe Tour	Nicolas Roche (IRL)	France	
22 June	Route du Sud, Points classification	UCI Europe Tour	Nicolas Roche (IRL)	France	
22 June	Route du Sud, Teams classification	UCI Europe Tour	(Note: The riders on the squad were Christopher Juul-Jensen, Evgeni Petrov, Jay McCarthy, Jesper Hansen, Michael Rogers, Nicolas Roche, Edward Beltrán and Bruno Pires)	France	
11 July	Tour of Austria, Stage 6	UCI Europe Tour	Evgeni Petrov (RUS)	Austria	Villach
19 July	Tour de France, Stage 14	UCI World Tour	Rafał Majka (POL)	France	Risoul
22 July	Tour de France, Stage 16	UCI World Tour	Michael Rogers (AUS)	France	Bagnères-de-Luchon
23 July	Tour de France, Stage 17	UCI World Tour	Rafał Majka (POL)	France	Saint-Lary-Soulan Pla d'Adet
27 July	Tour de France, Mountains classification	UCI World Tour	Rafał Majka (POL)	France	
7 August	Tour de Pologne, Stage 5	UCI World Tour	Rafał Majka (POL)	Slovakia	Štrbské Pleso
8 August	Danmark Rundt, Stage 3	UCI Europe Tour	Manuele Boaro (ITA)	Denmark	Vejle
8 August	Tour de Pologne, Stage 6	UCI World Tour	Rafał Majka (POL)	Poland	Bukowina Tatrzańska
9 August	Tour de Pologne, Overall	UCI World Tour	Rafał Majka (POL)	Poland	
10 August	Danmark Rundt, Overall	UCI Europe Tour	Michael Valgren (DEN)	Denmark	
10 August	Danmark Rundt, Young rider classification	UCI Europe Tour	Michael Valgren (DEN)	Denmark	
10 August	Danmark Rundt, Teams classification	UCI Europe Tour	(Note: The riders on the squad were Matti Breschel, Chris Anker Sørensen, Christopher Juul-Jensen, Jesper Hansen, Michael Valgren, Manuele Boaro, Michael Mørkøv and Marko Kump)	Denmark	
8 September	Vuelta a España, Stage 16	UCI World Tour	Alberto Contador (ESP)	Spain	La Farrapona, Lagos de Somiedo
13 September	Vuelta a España, Stage 20	UCI World Tour	Alberto Contador (ESP)	Spain	Puerto de Ancares
14 September	Vuelta a España, Overall	UCI World Tour	Alberto Contador (ESP)	Spain	
14 September	Vuelta a España, Combination classification	UCI World Tour	Alberto Contador (ESP)	Spain	
