= 2010 Team Saxo Bank season =

2010 Team Saxo Bank season
Manager	Bjarne Riis
One-day victories	7
Stage race overall victories	5 (Note: After Alberto Contador's victory in the 2010 Tour de France was officially revoked, Andy Schleck became winner of the race.)
Stage race stage victories	19
Previous season • Next season

The 2010 season for Danish professional cycling team Team Saxo Bank began in January with the Tour Down Under and ended in October at the Japan Cup. As a UCI ProTour team, they were automatically invited and obliged to attend every event in the ProTour.

The team's manager is Bjarne Riis, in his twelfth season with the team.

The online investment bank Saxo Bank originally announced that they would end their sponsorship of the team after the 2010 season, feeling their advertising money would be better spent elsewhere. Riis brought in SunGard as a title sponsor for 2011, and later it was revealed that Saxo Bank would continue to sponsor the team for 2011 in spite of their previous announcement.

== 2010 roster ==
Ages as of January 1, 2010.

Rider	Date of birth
Jonathan Bellis (GBR)	August 16, 1988 (aged 21)
Matti Breschel (DEN)	August 31, 1984 (aged 25)
Fabian Cancellara (SUI)	March 18, 1981 (aged 28)
Baden Cooke (AUS)	October 12, 1978 (aged 31)
Laurent Didier (LUX)	July 19, 1984 (aged 25)
Jakob Fuglsang (DEN)	March 18, 1985 (aged 24)
Juan José Haedo (ARG)	January 26, 1981 (aged 28)
Sebastian Haedo (ARG)	April 18, 1983 (aged 26)
Frank Høj (DEN)	January 4, 1973 (aged 36)
Jonas Aaen Jørgensen (DEN)	April 20, 1986 (aged 23)
Dominic Klemme (GER)	October 31, 1986 (aged 23)
Kasper Klostergaard (DEN)	May 22, 1983 (aged 26)

Rider	Date of birth
Gustav Larsson (SWE)	September 20, 1980 (aged 29)
Anders Lund (DEN)	February 14, 1985 (aged 24)
Jarosław Marycz (POL)	April 17, 1987 (aged 22)
Michael Mørkøv (DEN)	April 30, 1985 (aged 24)
Stuart O'Grady (AUS)	August 6, 1973 (aged 36)
Richie Porte (AUS)	January 30, 1985 (aged 24)
Alex Rasmussen (DEN)	June 9, 1984 (aged 25)
Andy Schleck (LUX)	June 10, 1985 (aged 24)
Fränk Schleck (LUX)	April 15, 1980 (aged 29)
Chris Anker Sørensen (DEN)	September 5, 1984 (aged 25)
Nicki Sørensen (DEN)	May 14, 1975 (aged 34)
André Steensen (DEN)	October 12, 1987 (aged 22)
Jens Voigt (GER)	September 17, 1971 (aged 38)

Riders who joined the team for the 2010 season

Rider	2009 team
Baden Cooke	Vacansoleil
Laurent Didier	stagiaire (Team Saxo Bank)
Sebastian Haedo	Colavita–Sutter Home
Jonas Aaen Jørgensen	Team Capinordic
Jarosław Marycz	Team Fidibc.com
Richie Porte	Praties

Riders who left the team during or after the 2009 season

Rider	2010 team
Kurt Asle Arvesen	Team Sky
Lars Bak	Team HTC–Columbia
Lasse Bøchman	Glud & Marstrand–LRØ-Horsens
Matthew Goss	Team HTC–Columbia
Karsten Kroon	BMC Racing Team
Alexandr Kolobnev	Team Katusha
Marcus Ljungqvist	Retired
Jason McCartney	Team RadioShack
Jurgen Van Goolen	Omega Pharma–Lotto

== One-day races ==
In February, before the spring season and races known as "classics" began, Haedo won the first-ever Mumbai Cyclothon, the first UCI-rated race in the nation of India. He was first over the line after outsprinting a breakaway companion.

== Stage races ==
Cancellara got the team's first victory of the season, winning the inaugural Tour of Oman after a second-place finish in the event's closing individual time trial.

== Grand Tours ==
=== Giro d'Italia ===
Team Saxo Bank came to the Giro without its top stars, the Schleck brothers and Cancellara, preferring to hold them back for the Tour de France. The squad included time trial specialist Larsson, sprinters Cooke and Sebastian Haedo, and Grand Tour rookies Didier and Porte. Porte, fresh off his surprising win in the time trial in the Tour de Romandie, showed well in the Giro's stage 1 time trial, finishing sixth and taking the white jersey for best young rider. Neither of the squad's sprinters made the selections necessary in stages 2 and 3 to contest the depleted bunch finishes. Porte, however, did, and was tied with race leader Alexander Vinokourov on time before the transfer to Italy. Vinokourov got the pink jersey by a margin of hundredths of a second from the stage 1 time trial.

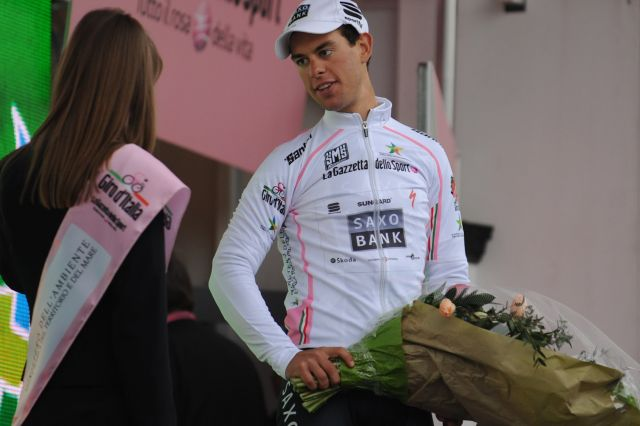
This was the first Grand Tour for Richie Porte; he had a stint in the pink jersey and two in the white, winning the latter upon the Giro's conclusion.

This ostensibly gave the team a chance to take the jersey in the stage 4 team time trial, but with Larsson and Porte the only solid time trialists on the squad, they were only able to ride to ninth place at 50 seconds back of stage winners Liquigas–Doimo. Porte dropped to eighth because of this result. The squad was then quiet until the Giro's first mountain stage, which ended with the long climb up Monte Terminillo. Chris Sørensen made the morning breakaway. While the peloton absorbed 15 members of the escape group during the climb, Sørensen and Colnago–CSF Inox's Simone Stortoni stayed away as the summit neared. Between the 14 km (8.7 mi) and 6 km (3.7 mi) to go marks, Sørensen put in many attacks with Stortoni easily covered, but at 6 km (3.7 mi) he slipped away and soloed to the stage win in a picturesque fog atop the mountain.

In stage 11, the Giro's longest, more than 50 riders formed the day's breakaway. This group attained a maximum advantage of 20 minutes, paving the way for significant changes to the overall standings. Chris Sørensen, Didier, and Porte, who had risen to sixth overall, all made the selection. Team Saxo Bank helped to drive the break, since Porte as the highest placed rider stood to take the pink jersey should they stay away. Porte finished 13th on the stage, but was 12 1/2 minutes clear of the peloton, becoming the new race leader with the result. Porte held the pink jersey for two days, through stages won by breakaways, before losing it to David Arroyo in the Monte Grappa stage. The squad was then largely quiet for the remainder of the race. Haedo took the team's only top ten in a group sprint in stage 18, after other sprinters had left the race. He was seventh on the day, behind André Greipel. In the time trial which closed out the Giro, Larsson posted an early best time as the 80th man to leave the starthouse. He was pleased with his time, and was concerned about only two riders of the nearly 100 to follow him – Team Sky and stage one time trial winner Bradley Wiggins and Italian national time trial champion Marco Pinotti. Wiggins was 12 seconds off Larsson's pace at the intermediate time check, which Larsson took to mean he could not beat his time at the finish line since Larsson is the better of the two in the downhills. He was nervous in watching Pinotti take the course near the end of the day, and the Italian champion posted a better time than Larsson at the intermediate time check, but he faded as the course went on and was two seconds slower than Larsson at the finish line, giving the Swede the stage win. Porte finished the Giro in seventh overall, winning the youth classification. The squad finished sixth in the Trofeo Fast Team standings and eighth in the Trofeo Super Team.

=== Tour de France ===
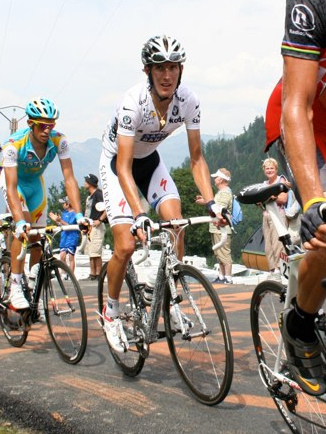
Andy Schleck was the squad's leader for the Tour de France. He won the young rider classification for the third consecutive year.

Team Saxo Bank's leader for the Tour de France was Andy Schleck, who was often mentioned as an overall favorite having finished second overall the year before. Brother Fränk was to be Andy's top lieutenant. The squad also included world time trial champion Cancellara and several experienced climbers.

Though Andy entered the race as the Luxembourgian national time trial champion, he was noted to be weak in the discipline relative to other overall favorites. In the 8.9 km (5.5 mi) prologue time trial which began the Tour, he lost over 30 seconds to most of the other overall contenders. Cancellara won the stage and as such took the first race leader's yellow jersey, as he had three other times in his career.

In stage 2 two days later, Cancellara used his status as race leader to negotiate a neutralization of the finish. After a rider from the morning breakaway crashed and inadvertently set off a cascade of other crashes on the Col du Stockeu in Spa, Cancellara spoke to race officials and came away with an agreement that the peloton would not contest the stage finish. This agreement effectively cost Cancellara his yellow jersey, as breakaway rider Sylvain Chavanel was still out front at the time, and finished almost four minutes ahead. Both Schleck brothers were among the multitude of riders to crash on this day, and Andy rode his chase back to the peloton on Breschel's bicycle after his was too damaged to continue riding.

The team had another dramatic day in stage 3. This stage, while flat, was expected to be difficult and feature many crashes, as it incorporated numerous cobbled sectors at the Belgium-France border. Cancellara, who in addition to being a superlative time trialist is also one of the best classics riders in the sport, effectively guided Andy Schleck in the front group for the entire stage. Both were exhausted at the finish from their work throughout the day, and finished fifth and sixth in the six-man sprint for the stage win. His position in the leading group gained Andy solid time against his rivals – 53 seconds over Denis Menchov and Jurgen Van den Broeck, a minute and 13 seconds over Alberto Contador, and over two minutes against Lance Armstrong, Ivan Basso, and Robert Gesink. Cancellara also reclaimed the yellow jersey, as Chavanel lost back almost the exact amount of time he had won the day before. However, earlier in the stage, just as the cobbled sections began, Fränk Schleck crashed hard. He was unable to continue and retired from the Tour with a broken collarbone.

Cancellara comfortably retained his race lead over the next three days in stages won by sprinters before losing it in stage 7 – incidentally, to the same man who took it previously, Chavanel. The Frenchman again won the stage from a solo breakaway. The next day was the Tour's first stage in the Alps, ending with a climb to Morzine-Avoriaz. A group of pre-race favorites (with Armstrong the notable absence) finished the stage as the first group on the road. Schleck and Euskaltel–Euskadi captain Samuel Sánchez gained ten seconds over the others as they fought for the stage win. Schleck won the sprint, his first career Tour stage win. The result also moved him up to second overall, 20 seconds behind new race leader Cadel Evans, as the overall standings were defined.

In stage 9, Contador and Schleck made a move which all but assured that one of them would be Tour champion. Schleck attacked from the group of overall contenders on the Col de la Madeleine, and drew Contador and Sánchez with him. After they had distanced themselves from the elite group for a short while, Schleck attacked again, and this time only Contador followed. They met up with Voigt, who had made the morning breakaway and paced them vigorously before bonking. They continually added to their advantage over the other top riders in the race and ended up reaching the remainder of the breakaway at the front of the race. They finished together with the five riders who were left from the morning escape, though neither tried for the stage win. This result installed Schleck as the race leader, with Contador in second 41 seconds behind him, and Sánchez two minutes behind Contador in third, a time gap that was unlikely to be overcome. The top of the overall standings stayed the same until stage 12, a mostly flat stage which ended with a short but nearly vertical climb to Mende. Schleck said before the stage that he disliked this sort of climb, and was apprehensive about losing time on it. As the peloton approached the finish, Astana's Alexander Vinokourov was out front and appeared poised for the stage win when his teammate Contador attacked out of the main field, something which is usually not done. Joaquim Rodríguez came with Contador and narrowly edged him at the finish for the stage win. The move gained Contador ten seconds over Schleck, though Schleck was satisfied with losing only that small amount of time, as he retained the yellow jersey. Schleck and Contador ceded 14 seconds to Menchov and Sánchez in stage 14, when they engaged in a bizarre seeming track stand during the stage-concluding climb to Ax-3-Domaines.

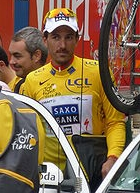
Fabian Cancellara won both time trials in the Tour de France, and wore the yellow jersey in a fourth career Tour. He also negotiated a stage neutralization early in the race.

Perhaps the Tour's biggest controversy ensued in stage 15. While the group of overall favorites climbed the Port de Balès, the chain on Schleck's bicycle slipped. It was at this exact moment that Contador put in an attack, with Menchov and Sánchez following him. Due to his mechanical trouble, Schleck was unable to follow until receiving support from team mechanics. He rode an aggressive descent of the Port de Balès, but still lost 39 seconds on the day, which was enough for Contador to assume the race leadership. When interviewed after the stage, Schleck angrily declared that he would recover his time losses on the Col du Tourmalet in the stage that ended there three days later. The incident touched off a widespread debate over whether Contador and the others who attacked should have waited for Schleck to receive mechanical assistance rather than ride away when Schleck, through no physical limitation of his own, could not follow. In stage 16 the next day, Voigt crashed hard on the Col de Peyresourde, totaling his bicycle. This was at the rear of the race, meaning the veteran German stood the risk of being eliminated from the Tour because of time loss to the stage winner. He encountered a representative from a program that has children ride part of one of the Tour stages, and borrowed a child's bike to ride for a time. Riis, at the front of the race, heard about Voigt's crash and left a spare bike with a local policeman to give to Voigt whenever he should come through. The plan worked and Voigt survived elimination.

In stage 17, Schleck and Contador again distinguished themselves as the two strongest riders in the race. They easily rode away from everyone else in the race on the Col du Tourmalet. Schleck tried repeatedly to distance himself from Contador, in hopes of regaining the yellow jersey, but Contador was able to follow his every move. At the finish, Contador did not sprint, and Schleck took his second stage win of the Tour. The day's results gave them an even larger gap over third-place man Sánchez, who now stood three and a half minutes back. The stage 19 individual time trial was the last chance for any changes to the overall standings. Due to a drastic increase in the speed of a headwind as the day went on, early starters posted considerably better times than those who came later. Contador, for example, who had won the long time trial in the 2009 Tour de France, finished this one in 35th place. While again recognized as a weaker time trialist than his Spanish rival, Schleck had only eight seconds to overcome on this stage and spoke of how he thought he had good chances. Indeed, at the first two intermediate time checks, Schleck had taken back those eight seconds and was momentarily exactly tied with Contador. Little by little, though, Schleck faded and Contador finished 31 seconds better of the two. This made their final time gap in the overall standings 39 seconds – the exact amount of time Contador took out of Schleck after the latter's mechanical incident on the Port de Balès. Cancellara won this time trial, giving the squad four stage wins in the Tour. The two held their positions in the Tour's largely ceremonial final stage the next day. Schleck won the youth classification for the third consecutive year, in his last year of eligibility. The squad was 12th in the teams classification.

Two months after the race concluded, it was revealed that Contador had tested positive for clenbuterol on July 21, the rest day before the stage ending at the Col du Tourmalet. As he potentially stood to be stripped of the Tour crown, it would have made Schleck the winner. Contador signed with Saxo Bank–SunGard for the 2011 season, and Riis revealed after the 2010 season ended that he had been in communications with the Spaniard while this Tour de France was ongoing.

On 6 February 2012, Contador was given a backdated two-year ban and stripped of both his 2010 Tour win for Astana – giving victory to Schleck – and the 2011 Giro d'Italia win for Saxo Bank–SunGard.

== Season victories ==
Date	Race	Competition	Rider	Country	Location
February 19	Tour of Oman, Overall	UCI Asia Tour	Fabian Cancellara (SUI)	Oman	
February 21	Mumbai Cyclothon	UCI Asia Tour	Juan José Haedo (ARG)	India	Mumbai
February 24	Ruta Del Sol, Stage 4	UCI Europe Tour	Alex Rasmussen (DEN)	Spain	Málaga
February 25	Ruta Del Sol, Teams classification	UCI Europe Tour	(Note: The riders on the squad were Fränk Schleck, Jens Voigt, Gustav Larsson, Jakob Fuglsang, André Steensen, Alex Rasmussen, and Michael Mørkøv)	Spain	
March 24	Dwars door Vlaanderen	UCI Europe Tour	Matti Breschel (DEN)	Belgium	Waregem
March 25	Volta a Catalunya, Stage 4	UCI ProTour	Jens Voigt (GER)	Spain	Ascó
March 27	E3 Prijs Vlaanderen – Harelbeke	UCI Europe Tour	Fabian Cancellara (SUI)	Belgium	Harelbeke
March 28	Volta a Catalunya, Stage 7	UCI ProTour	Juan José Haedo (ARG)	Spain	Circuit de Catalunya
April 4	Tour of Flanders	UCI ProTour	Fabian Cancellara (SUI)	Belgium	Ninove
April 5	Rund um Köln	UCI Europe Tour	Juan José Haedo (ARG)	Germany	Köln
April 11	Paris–Roubaix	UCI World Ranking	Fabian Cancellara (SUI)	France	Roubaix
April 30	Tour de Romandie, Stage 3	UCI ProTour	Richie Porte (AUS)	Switzerland	Moudon
May 1	GP Herning	UCI Europe Tour	Alex Rasmussen (DEN)	Denmark	Herning
May 5	Four Days of Dunkirk, Stage 1	UCI Europe Tour	Alex Rasmussen (DEN)	France	Bray-Dunes
May 7	Four Days of Dunkirk, Stage 3	UCI Europe Tour	Alex Rasmussen (DEN)	France	Ypres
May 16	Giro d'Italia, Stage 8	UCI World Ranking	Chris Anker Sørensen (DEN)	Italy	Monte Terminillo
May 30	Giro d'Italia, Stage 21	UCI World Ranking	Gustav Larsson (SWE)	Italy	Verona
May 30	Giro d'Italia, Youth classification	UCI World Ranking	Richie Porte (AUS)	Italy	
June 4	Tour de Luxembourg, Stage 2	UCI Europe Tour	Fränk Schleck (LUX)	Luxembourg	Differdange
June 8	Critérium du Dauphiné, Stage 2	UCI World Ranking	Juan José Haedo (ARG)	France	Bourg-Saint-Andéol
June 12	Tour de Suisse, Stage 1	UCI World Ranking	Fabian Cancellara (SWI)	Switzerland	Lugano
June 14	Tour de Suisse, Stage 3	UCI World Ranking	Fränk Schleck (LUX)	Switzerland	Schwarzenburg
June 20	Tour de Suisse, Overall	UCI World Ranking	Fränk Schleck (LUX)	Switzerland	
June 20	Tour de Suisse, Teams classification	UCI World Ranking	(Note: The riders on the squad were Fabian Cancellara, Matti Breschel, Jakob Fuglsang, Gustav Larsson, Stuart O'Grady, Andy Schleck, Fränk Schleck and Jens Voigt)	Switzerland	
July 3	Tour de France, Prologue	UCI World Ranking	Fabian Cancellara (SWI)	Netherlands	Rotterdam
July 11	Tour de France, Stage 8	UCI World Ranking	Andy Schleck (LUX)	France	Avoriaz
July 17	Vuelta a la Comunidad de Madrid, Stage 1	UCI Europe Tour	Gustav Larsson (SWE)	Spain	Caso de Campo
July 22	Tour de France, Stage 17	UCI World Ranking	Andy Schleck (LUX)	France	Col du Tourmalet
July 24	Tour de France, Stage 19	UCI World Ranking	Fabian Cancellara (SWI)	France	Pauillac
July 25	Tour de France, Overall	UCI World Ranking	Andy Schleck (LUX)	France	
July 25	Tour de France, Youth classification	UCI World Ranking	Andy Schleck (LUX)	France	
August 6	Tour of Denmark, Stage 3	UCI Europe Tour	Matti Breschel (DEN)	Denmark	Vejle
August 8	Tour of Denmark, Overall	UCI Europe Tour	Jakob Fuglsang (DEN)	Denmark	
August 8	Tour of Denmark, Sprints classification	UCI Europe Tour	Matti Breschel (DEN)	Denmark	
August 8	Tour of Denmark, Teams classification	UCI Europe Tour	(Note: The riders on the squad were Jakob Fuglsang, Matti Breschel, Jens Voigt, Richie Porte, Alex Rasmussen, André Steensen, Jonas Aaen Jørgensen and Michael Mørkøv)	Denmark	
August 18	Tour du Limousin, Stage 2	UCI Europe Tour	Gustav Larsson (SWE)	France	Saint Amand Montrond
August 20	Tour du Limousin, Overall	UCI Europe Tour	Gustav Larsson (SWE)	France	
October 18	UCI World Ranking, Teams classification	UCI World Ranking	(Note: This award is calculated by adding the points earned by a team's top five riders in the individual standings. Those five riders were Andy Schleck, Fabian Cancellara, Fränk Schleck, Richie Porte, and Jakob Fuglsang.)		
