= Tour de Israel =

Cycling competition

The Tour de Israel was a four-day cycling competition held in Israel and modeled on the Tour de France.

The race was held over a 622-kilometer (386 mi) route beginning in Nahariya in northern Israel, and ending in the resort city of Eilat on the Red Sea.

The event was sponsored by the Israeli Tourism Ministry and was a two-person team competition, featuring nine separate categories based on gender and age: Men; Women; Mixed Gender; Adults, Masters and Grand Masters.

== 2010 Event ==
The first Tour de Israel was held on 7–11 March 2010. 124 cyclists, including 44 foreign cyclists, participated.

The route passed along the Mediterranean Sea shore, through the Galilee mountains, Mount Hermon, the Sea of Galilee, Beit She'an and Nazareth and then along the Jordan Rift Valley and the Dead Sea, past Masada to the Negev mountains to the finish line in Eilat.

Niv Libner and Ran Margaliot, two Israelis competing as the GO-PRO team, were the winners with an overall time of 19:09:09.45 hours. Second place went to Zachi Boigen and Anton Michaelov, and international triathlon champions Dan and Ran Alterman came in third.

== 2011 Event ==
An on-road and an off-road event were originally scheduled to take place in March 2011. The events were cancelled by the organizer due to insufficient participants and sponsors.
