= 2011 Paris–Tours =

2010–11 UCI Europe Tour
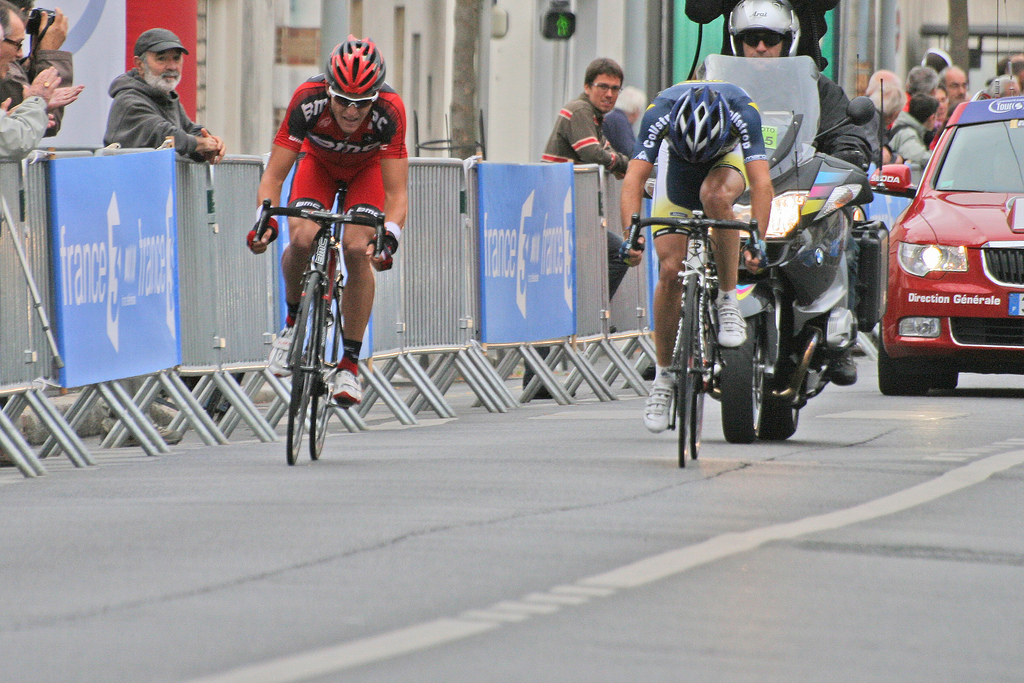
- Van Avermaet and Marcato, in the winning break

Race details
- Dates: 9 October 2011
- Stages: 1
- Distance: 230.5 km (143.2 mi)
- Winning time: 5 hr 21' 43"

Results
| | Winner | Greg Van Avermaet (BEL) | (BMC Racing Team) |
| | Second | Marco Marcato (ITA) | (Vacansoleil–DCM) |
| | Third | Kasper Klostergaard (DEN) | (Saxo Bank–SunGard) |

The 2011 Paris–Tours was the 105th edition of this single day road bicycle racing event. Greg Van Avermaet outsprinted Marco Marcato in the final meters to stay out of the grip of the chasing group and peloton. Van Avermaet thereby won the biggest race of his career so far.

== Course ==
The course saw the introduction of a new finale; the construction of a tram line on the Avenue de Grammont in central Tours led to the organisers shortening the finishing straight by 2.4 km. The new finish led to suggestions that the traditional sprint finish could be hampered, as there would be less time for the peloton to chase down any breakaways after the final climb.

== Pre-race favourites ==
Given the race's status as the "Sprinters' Classic", several sprinters were named among the favourites. Among them, Mark Cavendish, fresh off his world road race title in Copenhagen, reigning champion Óscar Freire, 2007 winner Alessandro Petacchi and Romain Feillu were considered favourites. 2008 and 2009 champion Philippe Gilbert was enjoying a successful season, being ranked first in the UCI World Tour rankings and looking to claim his 19th victory of the season. Despite not being a sprinter, the changes to the route were suggested as being to his advantage – the final climb of the Côte de l’Epan seven kilometres from the end, followed by a winding descent from the climb and a shorter run-in on the Avenue de Grammont were mentioned as various factors which could prevent the traditional sprint finish. Other candidates for a breakaway victory were Sylvain Chavanel, Thomas Voeckler and Frédéric Guesdon.

== Race ==
The race departed from Voves amid wet and windy conditions, which led to suggestions that the race was less likely to end in a sprint finish. The early breakaway of the day was soon formed, and composed of seven riders: Rubens Bertogliati (Team Type 1–Sanofi), David Boucher (Omega Pharma–Lotto), Will Clarke (Leopard Trek), Sébastien Delfosse (Landbouwkrediet), Jurgen Van Goolen (Veranda's Willems–Accent), Andreas Klier (Garmin–Cervélo) and Rony Martias (Saur–Sojasun). The group were allowed a gap of over 11 minutes before the peloton began working to reduce the gap, and it was caught shortly after the 170 kilometre mark. But no sooner had it been caught than several riders seized the opportunity to attack – a group of 14 including Greg Van Avermaet (BMC Racing Team), László Bodrogi (Team Type 1–Sanofi), Mickaël Delage (FDJ), Arnaud Gérard (FDJ), Kasper Klostergaard (Saxo Bank–SunGard), Marco Marcato (Vacansoleil–DCM) and Ian Stannard (Team Sky) managed to create a gap to the peloton. The lead grew to around two minutes before HTC-Highroad began the chase to set up a sprint finish, but the breakaway riders were able to cooperate and keep the peloton at bay. After Cavendish began feeling fatigued, HTC gave up the chase. The gap remained steady until 19 kilometres from the end, when a group led by Philippe Gilbert split from the main pack. Despite creating a small gap, they did not manage to catch up to the leading breakaway of the day and were eventually reeled back in by the peloton. Sylvain Chavanel also tried his luck but struggled to pull away.

The first move from the leaders came from Gérard, 14 kilometres out, and he stayed away on his own for a time. Van Avermaet and Marcato made a joint move in the final ten kilometres; working together they caught and passed the Frenchman on the final climb of the Côte de l'Epan. The two pulled away from the rest of their breakaway companions, despite Delage's efforts to bring teammate Gérard back into contact with them. Klostergaard attacked the remainder of the breakaway with two kilometres to go and created a gap, but was unable to catch up with the two leaders. With one kilometre left the group of two held an advantage of 20 seconds, and were left to sprint against each other for the victory. Marcato began his sprint first, with Van Avermaet on his wheel, but quickly slowed after his leg cramped up. Van Avermaet sprinted past him to take the victory, his 4th of the season. Marcato finished two seconds back, with Klostergaard holding off Stannard and Bodrogi for third. The rest of the top ten was rounded out by other members of the telling 14-man breakaway, while the peloton came home over a minute down.

== General standings ==
| | Cyclist | Team | Time |
|---|---|---|---|
| 1 | Greg Van Avermaet (BEL) | BMC Racing Team | 5h 21' 43" |
| 2 | Marco Marcato (ITA) | Vacansoleil–DCM | + 2" |
| 3 | Kasper Klostergaard (DEN) | Saxo Bank–SunGard | + 15" |
| 4 | Ian Stannard (GBR) | Team Sky | + 15" |
| 5 | László Bodrogi (FRA) | Team Type 1–Sanofi | + 15" |
| 6 | Mickaël Delage (FRA) | FDJ | + 22" |
| 7 | Geoffroy Lequatre (FRA) | Team RadioShack | + 22" |
| 8 | Stuart O'Grady (AUS) | Leopard Trek | + 22" |
| 9 | Roy Curvers (NED) | Skil–Shimano | + 22" |
| 10 | Arnaud Gérard (FRA) | FDJ | + 26" |
