= 2004 Clásica de Almería =

Race details
- Dates: 29 February 2004
- Stages: 1
- Distance: 187.2 km (116.3 mi)
- Winning time: 4h 50' 37"

Results
	Winner	Jérôme Pineau (FRA)
	Second	Thomas Voeckler (FRA)
	Third	Benjamín Noval (ESP)

The 2004 Clásica de Almería was the 19th edition of the Clásica de Almería cycle race and was held on 29 February 2004. The race was won by Jérôme Pineau.

== General classification ==
Final general classification

Rank	Rider	Time
1	Jérôme Pineau (FRA)	4h 50' 37"
2	Thomas Voeckler (FRA)	+ 0"
3	Benjamín Noval (ESP)	+ 13"
4	Julio Lopez de la Torre (ESP)	+ 15"
5	Björn Leukemans (BEL)	+ 29"
6	José Ángel Gómez Marchante (ESP)	+ 32"
7	José Vicente García (ESP)	+ 35"
8	David de la Fuente (ESP)	+ 35"
9	Joseba Zubeldia (ESP)	+ 35"
10	Tomáš Konečný (CZE)	+ 37"
