= Edward Beltrán =

Colombian cyclist

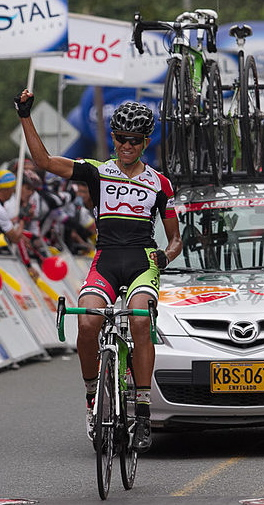
- Beltrán in 2013

Personal information
- Full name: Edward Alexander Beltrán Suárez
- Born: January 18, 1990 (age 36) Tunja, Colombia
- Height: 1.73 m (5 ft 8 in)
- Weight: 53 kg (117 lb)

Cycling career
- Sport: Cycling
- Discipline: Road
- Role: Rider

Professional teams
- 2010–2013: EPM–UNE
- 2014: Nankang–Fondriest
- 2014–2015: Tinkoff–Saxo
- 2016: EPM–UNE–Área Metropolitana
- 2017: Inteja Dominican Cycling Team
- 2018: EPM
- 2019: Medellín

Edward Alexander Beltrán Suárez (born January 18, 1990, in Tunja) is a Colombian cyclist, who last rode for UCI Continental team Medellín.

== Major results ==
2010
2nd Overall Vuelta a Colombia U23

1st Stages 1 (TTT) & 4

2nd Overall Girobio
2011
3rd Overall Tour do Rio
2012
3rd Overall Vuelta a la Independencia Nacional
6th Overall Vuelta al Mundo Maya

1st Young rider classification

2013
1st Overall Vuelta al Mundo Maya

1st Stages 1 & 2

1st Stage 8 Clásico RCN
2019
10th Overall Tour of the Gila
