= 2011 Tour de Romandie =

2011 UCI World Tour, race 13 of 27
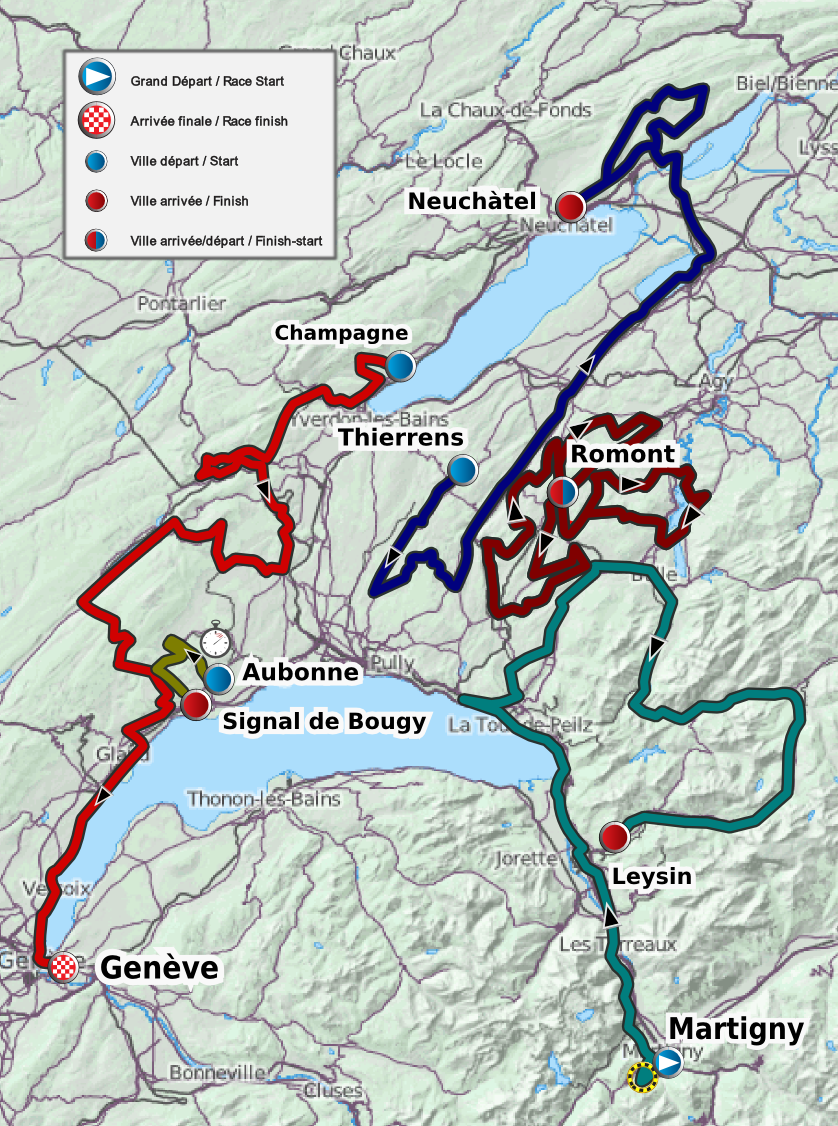
- Map of the race

Race details
- Dates: 26 April – 1 May 2011
- Stages: 5 + Prologue
- Distance: 694.5 km (431.5 mi)
- Winning time: 16h 51' 49

Results
Jersey awarded to the overall winner	Winner	Cadel Evans (AUS)	(BMC Racing Team)
	Second	Tony Martin (GER)	(HTC–Highroad)
	Third	Alexander Vinokourov (KAZ)	(Astana)
Jersey awarded to the mountains classification winner	Mountains	Chris Anker Sørensen (DEN)	(Saxo Bank–SunGard)
Jersey awarded to the youth classification winner	Youth	Andrew Talansky (USA)	(Garmin–Cervélo)
Jersey awarded to the sprints classification winner	Sprints	Matthias Brändle (AUT)	(Geox–TMC)
	Team	Garmin–Cervélo	

The 2011 Tour de Romandie was the 65th edition of the Tour de Romandie cycling stage race and the 13th event of the 2011 UCI World Tour. It started on 26 April in Martigny and ended on 1 May in Geneva and consisted of six stages, including a race-commencing prologue stage and also a penultimate day individual time trial.

The race was won by BMC Racing Team rider Cadel Evans, who claimed the leader's yellow jersey for the second time – having previously won the race in 2006 – with an eighth-place finish on the penultimate time trial stage, and held his advantage to the end of the race. Evans' winning margin over runner-up Tony Martin was 18 seconds, and Astana's Alexander Vinokourov completed the podium, 19 seconds down on Evans.

In the race's other classifications, Saxo Bank–SunGard rider Chris Anker Sørensen won the King of the Mountains classification, Matthias Brändle of Geox–TMC won the green jersey for the sprints classification, Garmin–Cervélo's Andrew Talansky won the young rider classification, with Garmin–Cervélo also finishing at the head of the teams classification.

== Pre-race favourites ==
Pre-race favourites included the 2006 winner Cadel Evans, 2009 winner Roman Kreuziger, and the 2010 winner Simon Špilak.

== Teams ==
Twenty teams participated in the race.

- Ag2r–La Mondiale
- Astana
- BMC Racing Team
- Euskaltel–Euskadi
- Garmin–Cervélo
- Geox–TMC
- HTC–Highroad
- Lampre–ISD
- Leopard Trek
- Liquigas–Cannondale
- Movistar Team
- Omega Pharma–Lotto
- Quick-Step
- Rabobank
- Saxo Bank–SunGard
- Team Europcar
- Team Katusha
- Team RadioShack
- Team Sky
- Vacansoleil–DCM

== Stages ==
=== Prologue ===
26 April – Martigny, 3 kilometres (1.9 mi), individual time trial (ITT)

Prologue results
Rank	Rider	Team	Time
1	Jonathan Castroviejo (SPA)	Euskaltel–Euskadi	3' 40"
2	Taylor Phinney (USA)	BMC Racing Team	+ 0"
3	Leigh Howard (AUS)	HTC–Highroad	+ 1"
4	Geoffroy Lequatre (FRA)	Team RadioShack	+ 2"
5	David Millar (GBR)	Garmin–Cervélo	+ 2"
6	Dennis van Winden (NED)	Rabobank	+ 3"
7	Patrick Gretsch (GER)	HTC–Highroad	+ 3"
8	Mark Renshaw (AUS)	HTC–Highroad	+ 4"
9	Alexander Vinokourov (KAZ)	Astana	+ 4"
10	Daniele Bennati (ITA)	Leopard Trek	+ 4"

General classification after Prologue
Rank	Rider	Team	Time
1	Jonathan Castroviejo (SPA)	Euskaltel–Euskadi	3' 40"
2	Taylor Phinney (USA)	BMC Racing Team	+ 0"
3	Leigh Howard (AUS)	HTC–Highroad	+ 1"
4	Geoffroy Lequatre (FRA)	Team RadioShack	+ 2"
5	David Millar (GBR)	Garmin–Cervélo	+ 2"
6	Dennis van Winden (NED)	Rabobank	+ 3"
7	Patrick Gretsch (GER)	HTC–Highroad	+ 3"
8	Mark Renshaw (AUS)	HTC–Highroad	+ 4"
9	Alexander Vinokourov (KAZ)	Astana	+ 4"
10	Daniele Bennati (ITA)	Leopard Trek	+ 4"

=== Stage 1 ===
27 April 2011 – Martigny to Leysin, 169.3 kilometres (105.2 mi)

Stage 1 results
Rank	Rider	Team	Time
1	Pavel Brutt	Team Katusha	4h 27' 41"
2	Oleksandr Kvachuk (UKR)	Lampre–ISD	+ 56"
3	Branislau Samoilau (BLR)	Movistar Team	+ 1' 15"
4	Jack Bobridge (AUS)	Garmin–Cervélo	+ 1' 23"
5	Damiano Cunego (ITA)	Lampre–ISD	+ 1' 59"
6	Beñat Intxausti (SPA)	Movistar Team	+ 2' 01"
7	Cadel Evans (AUS)	BMC Racing Team	+ 2' 03"
8	Chris Froome (GBR)	Team Sky	+ 2' 05"
9	David López (SPA)	Movistar Team	+ 2' 05"
10	Simon Špilak (SLO)	Lampre–ISD	+ 2' 05"

General classification after stage 1
Rank	Rider	Team	Time
1	Pavel Brutt	Team Katusha	4h 31' 26"
2	Oleksandr Kvachuk (UKR)	Lampre–ISD	+ 1' 00"
3	Branislau Samoilau (BLR)	Movistar Team	+ 1' 22"
4	Jack Bobridge (AUS)	Garmin–Cervélo	+ 1' 31"
5	Alexander Vinokourov (KAZ)	Astana	+ 2' 04"
6	Gorka Verdugo (SPA)	Euskaltel–Euskadi	+ 2' 04"
7	Cadel Evans (AUS)	BMC Racing Team	+ 2' 06"
8	Steve Morabito (SWI)	BMC Racing Team	+ 2' 08"
9	Damiano Cunego (ITA)	Lampre–ISD	+ 2' 08"
10	Beñat Intxausti (SPA)	Movistar Team	+ 2' 09"

=== Stage 2 ===
28 April 2011 – Romont, 168.3 kilometres (104.6 mi)

Stage 2 results
Rank	Rider	Team	Time
1	Damiano Cunego (ITA)	Lampre–ISD	4h 10' 53"
2	Cadel Evans (AUS)	BMC Racing Team	+ 2"
3	Alexander Vinokourov (KAZ)	Astana	+ 2"
4	Rui Costa (POR)	Movistar Team	+ 2"
5	David López (SPA)	Movistar Team	+ 2"
6	Beñat Intxausti (SPA)	Movistar Team	+ 2"
7	Andrew Talansky (USA)	Garmin–Cervélo	+ 2"
8	Tony Martin (GER)	HTC–Highroad	+ 2"
9	Denis Menchov	Geox–TMC	+ 2"
10	Pieter Weening (NED)	Rabobank	+ 2"

General classification after stage 2
Rank	Rider	Team	Time
1	Pavel Brutt	Team Katusha	8h 43' 39"
2	Damiano Cunego (ITA)	Lampre–ISD	+ 38"
3	Cadel Evans (AUS)	BMC Racing Team	+ 42"
4	Alexander Vinokourov (KAZ)	Astana	+ 42"
5	Gorka Verdugo (SPA)	Euskaltel–Euskadi	+ 46"
6	Steve Morabito (SWI)	BMC Racing Team	+ 50"
7	Beñat Intxausti (SPA)	Movistar Team	+ 51"
8	Oliver Zaugg (SWI)	Leopard Trek	+ 51"
9	Pieter Weening (NED)	Rabobank	+ 51"
10	Thomas Rohregger (AUT)	Leopard Trek	+ 52"

=== Stage 3 ===
29 April 2011 – Thierrens to Neuchâtel, 166.5 kilometres (103.5 mi)

Stage 3 results
Rank	Rider	Team	Time
1	Alexander Vinokourov (KAZ)	Astana	3h 47' 55"
2	Mikaël Cherel (FRA)	Ag2r–La Mondiale	+ 0"
3	Tony Martin (GER)	HTC–Highroad	+ 0"
4	Ben Swift (GBR)	Team Sky	+ 0"
5	Óscar Freire (SPA)	Rabobank	+ 0"
6	Davide Viganò (ITA)	Leopard Trek	+ 0"
7	Geoffroy Lequatre (FRA)	Team RadioShack	+ 0"
8	Alan Pérez (SPA)	Euskaltel–Euskadi	+ 0"
9	Manuele Mori (ITA)	Lampre–ISD	+ 0"
10	Rob Ruijgh (NED)	Vacansoleil–DCM	+ 0"

General classification after stage 3
Rank	Rider	Team	Time
1	Pavel Brutt	Team Katusha	12h 31' 34"
2	Alexander Vinokourov (KAZ)	Astana	+ 32"
3	Damiano Cunego (ITA)	Lampre–ISD	+ 38"
4	Cadel Evans (AUS)	BMC Racing Team	+ 42"
5	Gorka Verdugo (SPA)	Euskaltel–Euskadi	+ 46"
6	Steve Morabito (SWI)	BMC Racing Team	+ 50"
7	Beñat Intxausti (SPA)	Movistar Team	+ 51"
8	Oliver Zaugg (SWI)	Leopard Trek	+ 51"
9	Pieter Weening (NED)	Rabobank	+ 51"
10	Thomas Rohregger (AUT)	Leopard Trek	+ 52"

=== Stage 4 ===
30 April 2011 – Aubonne to Bougy-Villars, 20.1 kilometres (12.5 mi), individual time trial (ITT)

Stage 4 results
Rank	Rider	Team	Time
1	David Zabriskie (USA)	Garmin–Cervélo	27' 57"
2	Richie Porte (AUS)	Saxo Bank–SunGard	+ 2"
3	Lieuwe Westra (NED)	Vacansoleil–DCM	+ 14"
4	Bradley Wiggins (GBR)	Team Sky	+ 18"
5	Tony Martin (GER)	HTC–Highroad	+ 27"
6	Andrew Talansky (USA)	Garmin–Cervélo	+ 42"
7	Steven Kruijswijk (NED)	Rabobank	+ 43"
8	Cadel Evans (AUS)	BMC Racing Team	+ 45"
9	Jonathan Castroviejo (SPA)	Euskaltel–Euskadi	+ 48"
10	Linus Gerdemann (GER)	Leopard Trek	+ 54"

General classification after stage 4
Rank	Rider	Team	Time
1	Cadel Evans (AUS)	BMC Racing Team	13h 00' 58"
2	Tony Martin (GER)	HTC–Highroad	+ 18"
3	Alexander Vinokourov (KAZ)	Astana	+ 19"
4	Marco Pinotti (ITA)	HTC–Highroad	+ 31"
5	Beñat Intxausti (SPA)	Movistar Team	+ 41"
6	Pieter Weening (NED)	Rabobank	+ 51"
7	Janez Brajkovič (SLO)	Team RadioShack	+ 52"
8	Pavel Brutt	Team Katusha	+ 58"
9	Andrew Talansky (USA)	Garmin–Cervélo	+ 59"
10	David Millar (GBR)	Garmin–Cervélo	+ 1' 00"

=== Stage 5 ===
1 May 2011 – Champagne to Geneva, 164.6 kilometres (102.3 mi)

Stage 5 results
Rank	Rider	Team	Time
1	Ben Swift (GBR)	Team Sky	3h 50' 51"
2	Davide Viganò (ITA)	Leopard Trek	+ 0"
3	Óscar Freire (SPA)	Rabobank	+ 0"
4	Fabio Sabatini (ITA)	Liquigas–Cannondale	+ 0"
5	Enrico Gasparotto (ITA)	Astana	+ 0"
6	Fumiyuki Beppu (JAP)	Team RadioShack	+ 0"
7	Tony Martin (GER)	HTC–Highroad	+ 0"
8	Nicolas Roche (IRE)	Ag2r–La Mondiale	+ 0"
9	Yukiya Arashiro (JAP)	Team Europcar	+ 0"
10	Enrique Sanz (SPA)	Movistar Team	+ 0"

General classification after stage 5
Rank	Rider	Team	Time
1	Cadel Evans (AUS)	BMC Racing Team	16h 51' 49"
2	Tony Martin (GER)	HTC–Highroad	+ 18"
3	Alexander Vinokourov (KAZ)	Astana	+ 19"
4	Marco Pinotti (ITA)	HTC–Highroad	+ 31"
5	Beñat Intxausti (SPA)	Movistar Team	+ 41"
6	Pieter Weening (NED)	Rabobank	+ 51"
7	Janez Brajkovič (SLO)	Team RadioShack	+ 52"
8	Pavel Brutt	Team Katusha	+ 58"
9	Andrew Talansky (USA)	Garmin–Cervélo	+ 59"
10	David Millar (GBR)	Garmin–Cervélo	+ 1' 00"

== Classification leadership ==
Classification leadership by stage
Stage	Winner	General classification	Mountains classification	Young rider classification	Team classification
P	Jonathan Castroviejo	Jonathan Castroviejo	not awarded	Jonathan Castroviejo	HTC–Highroad
1	Pavel Brutt	Pavel Brutt	Oleksandr Kvachuk	Jack Bobridge	Lampre–ISD
2	Damiano Cunego	Pavel Brutt	Oleksandr Kvachuk	Peter Stetina	Movistar Team
3	Alexander Vinokourov	Pavel Brutt	Oleksandr Kvachuk	Peter Stetina	Movistar Team
4	David Zabriskie	Cadel Evans	Oleksandr Kvachuk	Andrew Talansky	Garmin–Cervélo
5	Ben Swift	Cadel Evans	Chris Anker Sørensen	Andrew Talansky	Garmin–Cervélo
Final		Cadel Evans	Chris Anker Sørensen	Andrew Talansky	Garmin–Cervélo

== Classification standings ==
=== General classification ===
Final general classification (1–10)
Rank	Rider	Team	Time
1	Cadel Evans (AUS)	BMC Racing Team	16h 51' 49"
2	Tony Martin (GER)	HTC–Highroad	+ 18"
3	Alexander Vinokourov (KAZ)	Astana	+ 19"
4	Marco Pinotti (ITA)	HTC–Highroad	+ 31"
5	Beñat Intxausti (SPA)	Movistar Team	+ 41"
6	Pieter Weening (NED)	Rabobank	+ 51"
7	Janez Brajkovič (SLO)	Team RadioShack	+ 52"
8	Pavel Brutt	Team Katusha	+ 58"
9	Andrew Talansky (USA)	Garmin–Cervélo	+ 59"
10	David Millar (GBR)	Garmin–Cervélo	+ 1' 00"

=== Mountains classification ===
Final mountains classification (1–10)
Rank	Rider	Team	Points
1	Chris Anker Sørensen (DEN)	Saxo Bank–SunGard	32
2	Oleksandr Kvachuk (UKR)	Lampre–ISD	28
8	Pavel Brutt	Team Katusha	22
3	Branislau Samoilau (BLR)	Movistar Team	22
5	Pierre Roland (FRA)	Team Europcar	16
6	Christophe Kern (FRA)	Team Europcar	14
7	Ignatas Konovalovas (LTU)	Movistar Team	14
8	Roman Kreuziger (CZE)	Astana	12
8	Vladimir Gusev	Team Katusha	12
10	Steven Kruijswijk (NED)	Rabobank	12

=== Young rider classification ===
Final young rider classification (1–10)
Rank	Rider	Team	Time
1	Andrew Talansky (USA)	Garmin–Cervélo	16h 52' 48"
2	Peter Stetina (USA)	Garmin–Cervélo	+ 1' 15"
3	Cyril Gautier (FRA)	Team Europcar	+ 2' 18"
4	Steven Kruijswijk (NED)	Rabobank	+ 2' 44"
5	Matthias Brändle (AUT)	Geox–TMC	+ 2' 57"
6	Rafał Majka (POL)	Saxo Bank–SunGard	+ 3' 14"
7	Jesús Herrada (SPA)	Movistar Team	+ 5' 00"
8	Ben Swift (GBR)	Team Sky	+ 7' 31"
9	Alexandre Pliușchin (MDA)	Team Katusha	+ 7' 47"
10	Martijn Keizer (NED)	Vacansoleil–DCM	+ 8' 28"

=== Team classification ===
Final team classification (1–10)
Rank	Team	Time
1	(United States) Garmin–Cervélo	50h 34' 41"
2	(Spain) Movistar Team	+ 2' 15"
3	(Netherlands) Leopard Trek	+ 3' 32"
4	(United Kingdom) Team Sky	+ 4' 42"
5	(France) Ag2r–La Mondiale	+ 5' 05"
6	(Italy) Lampre–ISD	+ 5' 30"
7	(United States) BMC Racing Team	+ 5' 39"
8	(Spain) Geox–TMC	+ 6' 15"
9	(Spain) Euskaltel–Euskadi	+ 7' 15"
10	Team Katusha	+ 7' 42"
