= Bruno Pires (cyclist) =

Portuguese racing cyclist

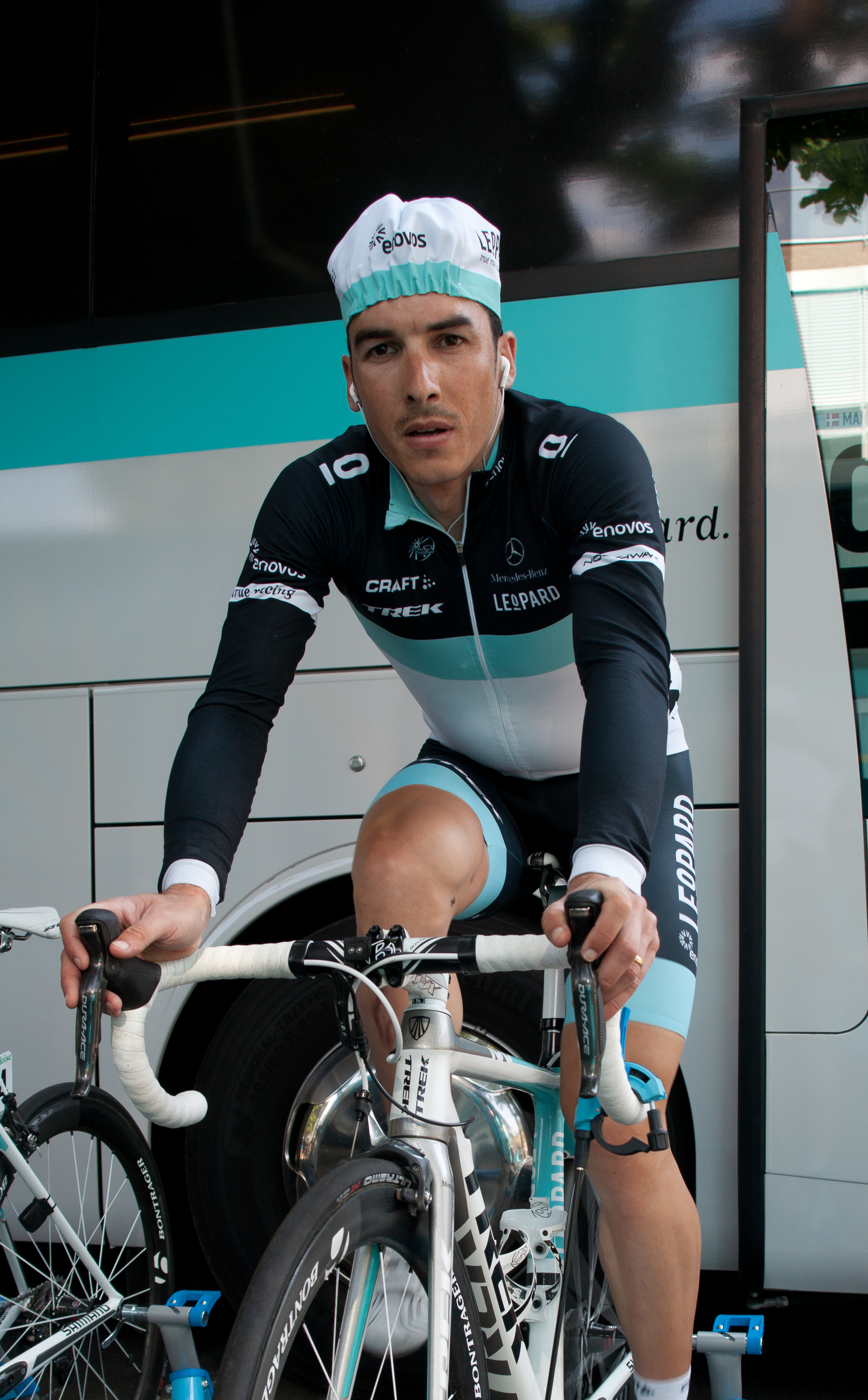
- Pires at the 2011 Tour de Romandie.

Personal information
- Full name: Bruno Manuel Pires Silva
- Born: 15 May 1981 (age 45) Redondo, Portugal
- Height: 1.74 m (5 ft 8 1/2 in)
- Weight: 63 kg (139 lb; 9.9 st)

Cycling career
- Sport: Cycling
- Current team: Retired
- Discipline: Road
- Role: Rider
- Rider type: Climber

Amateur teams
- 2001: Vitória de Setúbal
- 2003: ASC–Guilhabreu–Vila do Conde

Professional teams
- 2002: ASC–Vila do Conde
- 2004–2008: Milaneza–Maia
- 2009–2010: Barbot–Siper
- 2011: Leopard Trek
- 2012–2015: Team Saxo Bank
- 2016: Team Roth

Major wins
- National Road Race Championships (2006)

Bruno Manuel Pires Silva (born 15 May 1981) is a Portuguese former professional road bicycle racer, who competed professionally between 2002 and 2016.

Born in Redondo, Portugal, Pires began his professional career at the ASC-Vila do Conde team and was part of Milaneza–Maia and Barbot–Siper, before joining his first foreign team, Leopard Trek, in 2011. He then competed for four years with Tinkoff–Saxo, and his final season in 2016 was with Team Roth.

== Major results ==
2004
8th Overall Volta ao Alentejo
2005
4th Overall Volta ao Alentejo
5th Overall Vuelta a Asturias
2006
1st Road race, National Road Championships
2nd Overall Troféu Joaquim Agostinho
7th Overall Volta a Portugal
10th Overall Volta ao Alentejo
2007
1st Stage 4 Volta ao Alentejo
3rd Overall GP Internacional Paredes Rota dos Móveis

1st Stage 4

2008
2nd Prueba Villafranca de Ordizia
3rd Overall Vuelta a Asturias
5th Overall Volta ao Alentejo

1st Stage 4

7th Subida al Naranco
2009
2nd Overall Volta Ciclística de São Paulo
9th Overall Volta a Portugal
2010
6th Overall Volta ao Alentejo

1st Stage 2

2011
9th Overall USA Pro Cycling Challenge
2012
4th Overall Tour of Slovenia
2014
10th Overall USA Pro Cycling Challenge
2016
7th Overall Tour d'Azerbaïdjan
