= André Steensen =

Danish cyclist

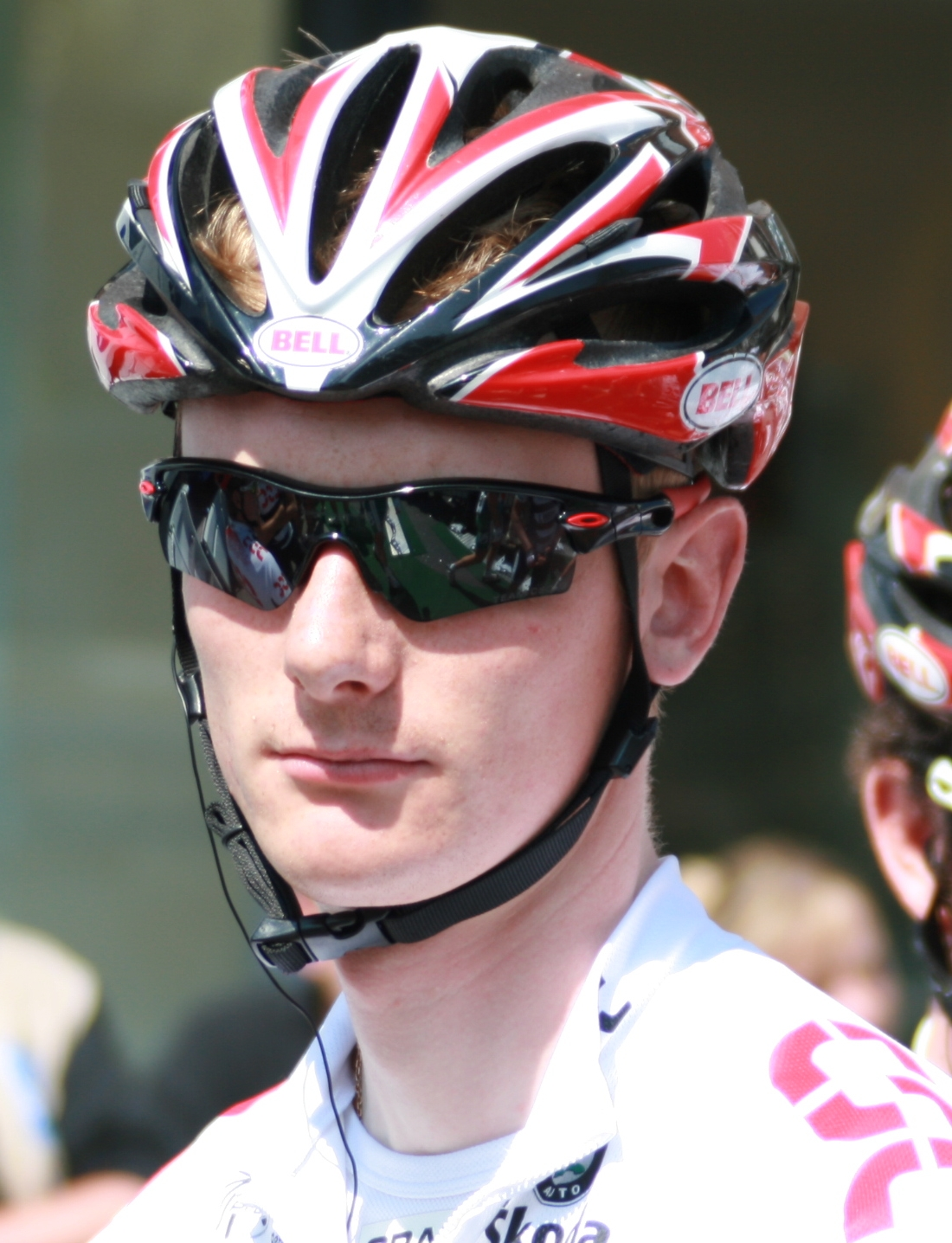
- Steensen at the 2008 Four Days of Dunkirk

Personal information
- Full name: André Steensen
- Born: 12 October 1987 (age 39) Skanderborg, Denmark
- Height: 1.85 m (6 ft 1 in)
- Weight: 65 kg (143 lb)

Cycling career
- Sport: Cycling
- Current team: Cult Energy Pro Cycling
- Discipline: Road
- Role: Rider
- Rider type: All-rounder

Professional teams
- 2006–2008: Glud & Marstrand–Horsens
- 2008–2011: Team CSC
- 2012–2014: Glud & Marstrand–LRØ

André Steensen (born 12 October 1987) is a Danish former professional racing cyclist who last rode for Cult Energy–Vital Water. Steensen retired after the 2014 season due to injury problems, becoming a DS for Cult Energy Pro Cycling.

== Palmarès ==
2006
7th Overall Thüringen Rundfahrt der U23
9th Overall Istrian Spring Trophy
2007
3rd Overall Tour de l'Avenir
10th Münsterland Giro
2011
8th Giro del Piemonte
2012
1st Overall Kreiz Breizh Elites

1st Stages 1 & 2 (ITT)
1st Points classification

1st Himmerland Rundt
1st Stage 2 Circuit des Ardennes
1st Stage 1 Flèche du Sud
2013
3rd Overall Boucle de l'Artois
2014
8th National Time Trial Championships
