= Benjamín Noval =

Spanish cyclist (born 1979)

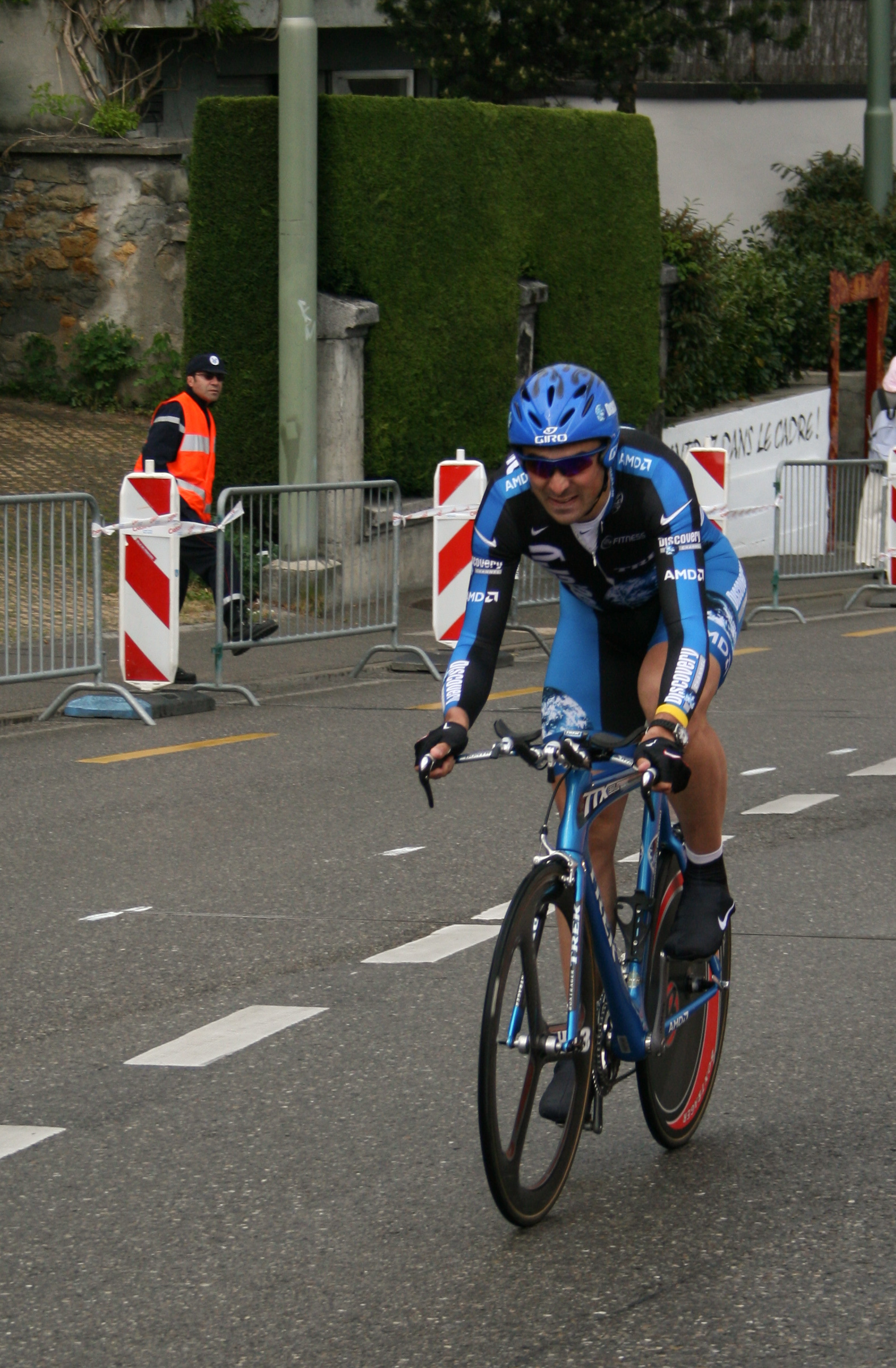
- Noval at the 2007 Tour de Romandie.

Personal information
- Full name: Benjamín Noval González
- Nickname: El Toro
- Born: 23 January 1979 (age 47) Mieres, Spain
- Height: 1.88 m (6 ft 2 in)
- Weight: 77 kg (170 lb)

Cycling career
- Sport: Cycling
- Current team: Retired
- Discipline: Road
- Role: Rider
- Rider type: Climber

Amateur team
- 2000: Tegui-Galibier

Professional teams
- 2001–2003: Relax–GAM
- 2004–2007: U.S. Postal Service
- 2008–2010: Astana
- 2011–2013: Saxo Bank–SunGard

Benjamín Noval González (born 23 January 1979) is a former Spanish professional road bicycle racer, who competed as a professional between 2001 and 2013.

Born in Mieres, Asturias, Noval turned professional in 2001, riding for Relax–GAM for three years before switching to U.S. Postal Service (later Discovery Channel), where he stayed for four years. Noval switched to Astana for 2008, and for the 2011 season joined compatriots and team-mates Alberto Contador, Jesús Hernández and Daniel Navarro in signing for Saxo Bank–SunGard. At the end of the 2013 racing season Noval announced his retirement from professional road racing, despite being offered a contract by Tinkoff–Saxo for the following season.

Noval's son, also named Benjamín Noval, is a successful junior cyclist who signed a contract with UCI WorldTeam Netcompany–Ineos in 2025.

== Major results ==
2000
9th Overall Vuelta a Navarra
2002
6th Overall Vuelta a La Rioja
9th Overall Volta a Catalunya

1st Points classification

2003
3rd Road race, National Road Championships
6th Overall Volta a Catalunya
2004
1st Stage 4 (TTT) Tour de France
3rd Clásica de Almería
2005
1st Stage 4 (TTT) Tour de France

=== Grand Tour general classification results timeline ===
Grand Tour	2002	2003	2004	2005	2006	2007	2008	2009	2010	2011	2012	2013
Giro d'Italia	—	—	—	—	—	—	—	—	—	—	—	—
Tour de France	—	—	66	107	DNF	115	—	—	101	116	—	DNF
Vuelta a España	DNF	45	—	58	—	—	62	—	—	—	108	—

Legend
—	Did not compete
DNF	Did not finish
