= Volodymir Gustov =

Ukrainian cyclist

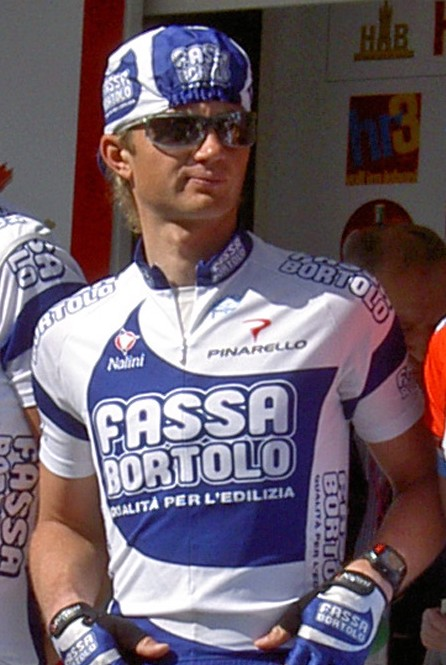
- Gustov at the 2005 Rund um den Henninger-Turm.

Personal information
- Full name: Volodymir Gustov; Володимир Густов
- Born: 15 February 1977 (age 49) Kyiv, Soviet Union
- Height: 1.79 m (5 ft 10 in)
- Weight: 64 kg (141 lb; 10.1 st)

Cycling career
- Sport: Cycling
- Discipline: Road
- Role: Rider
- Rider type: Climber

Professional teams
- 2000–2005: Fassa Bortolo
- 2006–2008: Team CSC
- 2009–2010: Cervélo TestTeam
- 2011–2012: Saxo Bank–SunGard

Major wins
- Regio-Tour (2003); Giro d'Italia 1 stage (TTT)

Volodymir Gustov (Ukrainian: Володимир Густов, sometimes transliterated as Volodymyr Hustov or other permutations; born 15 February 1977 in Kyiv) is a Ukrainian professional road bicycle racer, who last rode for UCI ProTeam Saxo Bank–Tinkoff Bank. He began his career in 2000 with Italian team Fassa Bortolo.

Before the 2002 Tour de Romandie, Gustov was tested with a hematocrit level above fifty percent. This indicates either health problems or doping usage so he was suspended for fifteen days, but in the middle of May, Fassa Bortolo announced that he could ride again. After laboratory tests accredited by the Union Cycliste Internationale (UCI), the governing body of cycling, it was stated that his high hematocrit and hemoglobin values were physiologically determined. As his contract ended prior to the 2006 season, former team mate Ivan Basso arranged for him to ride alongside him at Danish Team CSC.

After being selected for the 2008 Tour de France team, he worked for the two Schleck brothers and Carlos Sastre as the race got into the French Alps and Pyrenees.

== Major results ==
1999
10th Overall Settimana Ciclistica Lombarda
2000
2nd National Road Race Championships
6th Overall Settimana Ciclistica Lombarda
2001
8th Giro Provincia di Siracusa
10th Overall Tour de Pologne
10th Trofeo dello Scalatore II
2002
4th GP di Lugano
9th Overall Tour de Pologne
9th Giro dell'Emilia
2003
1st Overall Regio-Tour
8th Overall Paris–Nice
10th Giro della Toscana
2006
1st Stage 1 (TTT) Settimana internazionale di Coppi e Bartali
1st Stage 5 (TTT) Giro d'Italia
1st Stage 1 (TTT) Vuelta a España
2007
1st Stage 1 (TTT) Deutschland Tour
