= Ran Margaliot =

Israeli cyclist

Ran Margaliot רן מרגליות
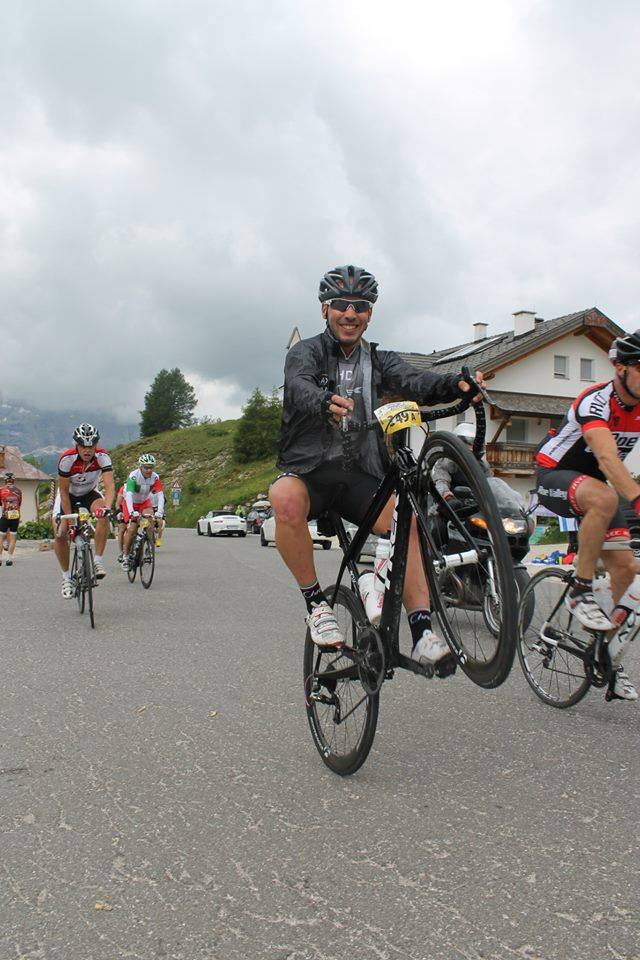
- Ran Margaliot (middle) in 2014

Personal information
- Born: July 18, 1988 (age 38)
- Height: 1.71 m (5 ft 7 in)
- Weight: 60 kg (132 lb)

Cycling career
- Sport: Cycling
- Discipline: Road
- Role: Directeur sportif; Rider

Amateur teams
- 2005–2006: Performance
- 2007: United
- 2008: Saunier Duval U23
- 2009: Translmiera–Fuji
- 2010: World Cycling Centere

Professional teams
- 2010: Footon–Servetto–Fuji (stagiaire)
- 2011: Saxo Bank–SunGard (stagiaire)
- 2012: Saxo Bank–Tinkoff Bank

Managerial team
- 2015–2018: Cycling Academy

Ran Margaliot (Hebrew: רן מרגליות; born July 18, 1988) is an Israeli former professional racing cyclist. After retiring, he was a team manager for Israel Cycling Academy from 2015 to 2018.

== Major results ==
2004
National Novice Road Championships

1st Road race
2nd Time trial

2005
3rd Road race, National Junior Road Championships
2010
1st Overall Tour of Israel (with Niv Libner)

1st stages 1, 2, 3 % 4 (with Niv Libner)

3rd Road race, National Road Championships
