= Kasper Klostergaard =

Danish cyclist

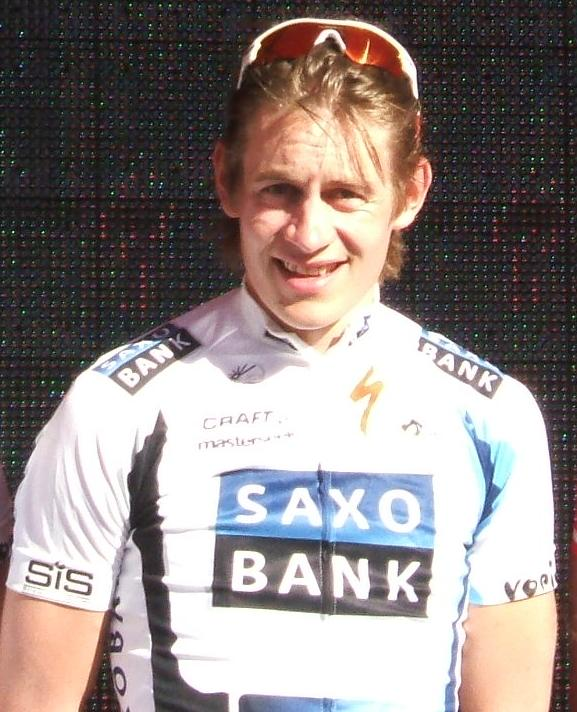
- Klostergaard at the 2009 Tour Down Under.

Personal information
- Full name: Kasper Klostergaard Larsen
- Born: 22 May 1983 (age 43) Horsens, Denmark
- Height: 1.82 m (6 ft 0 in)
- Weight: 69 kg (152 lb; 10.9 st)

Cycling career
- Sport: Cycling
- Current team: Riwal Cycling Team
- Discipline: Road
- Role: Rider
- Rider type: Classics rider

Professional teams
- 2002–2005: Glud & Marstrand–Horsens
- 2005: →Team CSC (stagiaire)
- 2006–2012: Team CSC
- 2013–: Concordia Forsikring–Riwal

Kasper Klostergaard Larsen (born 22 May 1983 in Horsens) is a Danish professional road racing cyclist, riding for Danish-based Riwal Cycling Team. In the last part of the 2005 season, the then Glud & Marstrand–Horsens rider was taken aboard Team CSC, as the team was then known, as a stagiaire, and was on the hard-working team that helped Lars Bak win the Tour de l'Avenir. His time at Team CSC resulted in a professional contract with the team for the 2006 and 2007 seasons.

== Palmares ==
2003
7th Overall Tour de Serbie
2004
1st Stage 2 Tour de Berlin
2005
1st Stage 10 International Cycling Classic
2011
3rd Paris–Tours
2012
4th Overall Paris–Corrèze
2013
7th Overall Tour du Loir et Cher
9th Overall Flèche du Sud
10th Overall Olympia's Tour
