= Anders Lund =

Danish cyclist (born 1985)

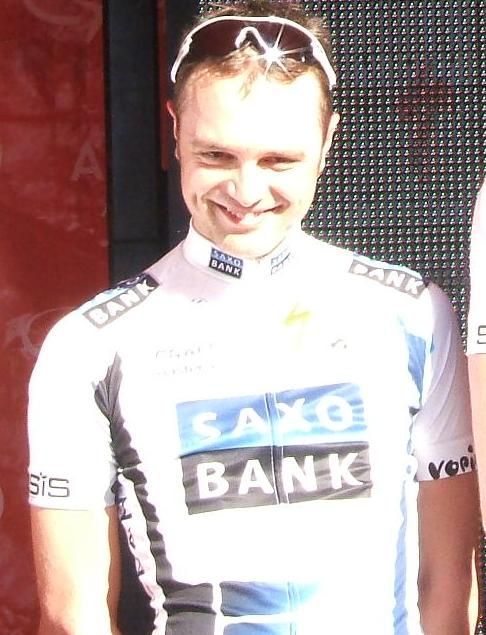
- Lund at the 2009 Tour Down Under.

Personal information
- Full name: Anders Lund
- Born: 14 February 1985 (age 41) Copenhagen, Denmark

Cycling career
- Sport: Cycling
- Discipline: Road
- Role: Rider

Professional teams
- 2007–2010: Team CSC
- 2011: Leopard Trek
- 2012–2013: Team Saxo Bank

Anders Lund (born 14 February 1985 in Copenhagen) is a Danish former professional road bicycle racer, who competed as a professional between 2007 and 2013. He started his cycling career racing for Ordrup Cycle Club in the north of Copenhagen, and was reckoned to be a very talented climber and skilled all-rounder. As a teenager he joined Team PH, which later changed its name to Team GLS, where he rode with Matti Breschel and Chris Anker Sørensen, both of whom were also later teammates with him at Team Saxo Bank. He turned professional in 2007 with Team CSC, as the Saxo Bank team was then known.

Lund retired at the end of the 2013 season, after seven seasons as a professional.

== Major results ==
2002
2nd National Junior Road Race Championships
2003
1st National Junior Road Race Championships
2nd World Junior Road Race Championships
2004
Circuit des Ardennes

1st Stages 1 & 5

2005
2nd European Under-23 Road Race Championships
2nd Overall Circuit des Ardennes

1st Stage 2

2nd U23 Liège–Bastogne–Liège
3rd National Under-23 Road Race Championships
5th Giro Belvedere di Villa di Cordignano
8th GP San Giuseppe
10th Overall Ringerike GP
2006
5th Ronde Van Vlaanderen Beloften
2007
6th GP Herning
2008
10th Overall Tour de Wallonie
2009
8th Route Adélie
2010
3rd National Road Race Championships
6th Overall Tour of Slovenia
8th Japan Cup
