= Mads Christensen (cyclist) =

Danish cyclist

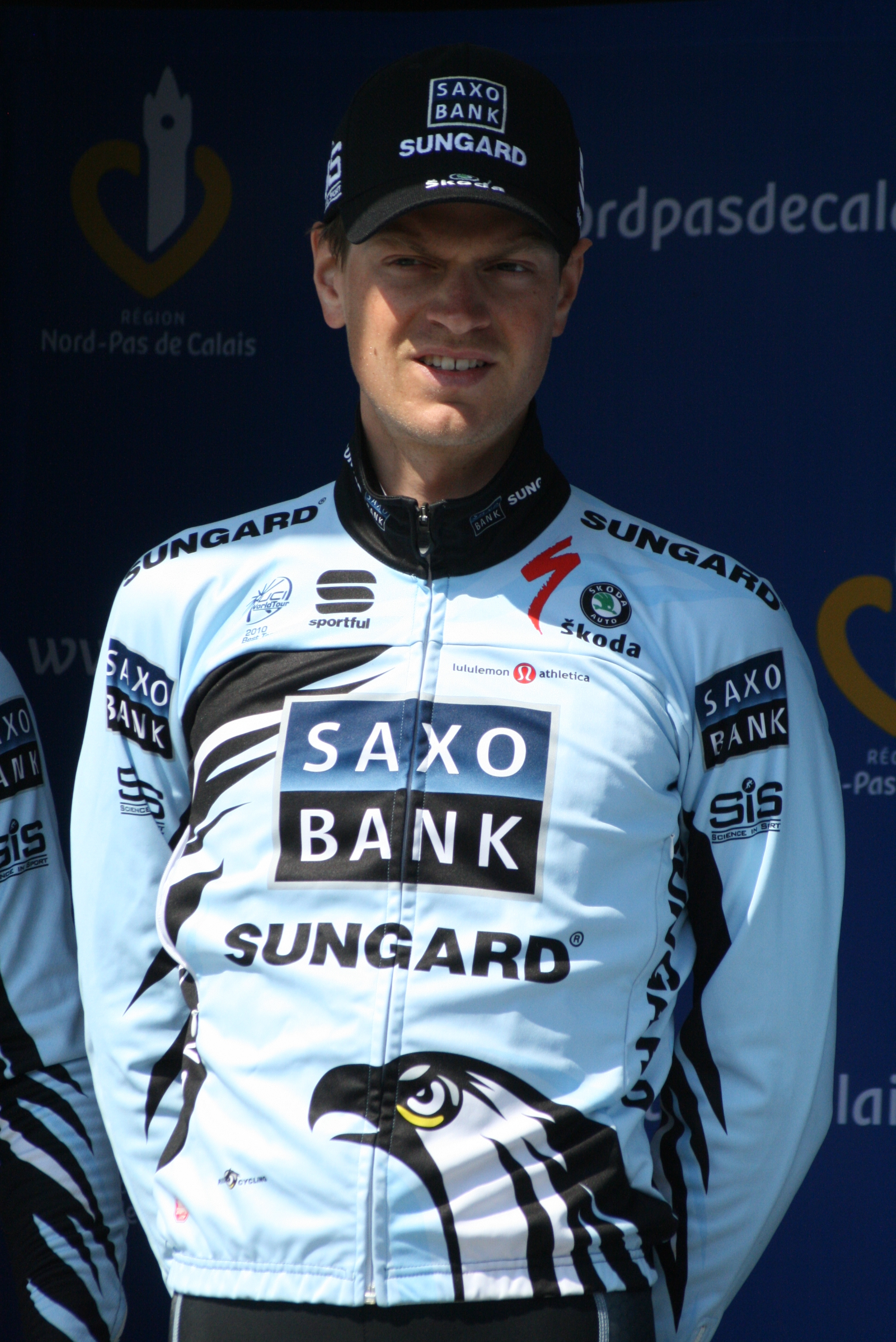
- Christensen at the 2011 Four Days of Dunkirk.

Personal information
- Full name: Mads Christensen
- Born: 6 April 1984 (age 42) Aalborg, Denmark
- Height: 1.82 m (5 ft 11 1/2 in)
- Weight: 69 kg (152 lb)

Cycling career
- Sport: Cycling
- Current team: Retired
- Disciplines: Road; Track
- Role: Rider
- Rider type: Climber

Professional teams
- 2004: Team PH
- 2005: Quick-Step–Innergetic
- 2006: Barloworld
- 2007–2009: Team Designa Køkken
- 2010: Glud & Marstrand–LRØ Radgivning
- 2011–2013: Saxo Bank–SunGard
- 2014–2015: Cult Energy–Vital Water

Mads Christensen (born 6 April 1984) is a Danish former professional road and track cyclist.

For the 2014 season, Christensen rejoined Cult Energy–Vital Water, after three seasons with Saxo–Tinkoff.

== Major results ==
2000
Junior National Track Championships

1st Track time trial
1st Individual pursuit
1st Team pursuit

1st Road race, National Junior Road Championships
2001
National Track Championships

1st Madison
1st Individual pursuit
1st Team pursuit

Junior National Track Championships

1st Individual pursuit
1st Team pursuit

2003
1st Road race, National Under-23 Road Championships
5th Overall Olympia's Tour
2004
1st Time trial, National Under-23 Road Championships
2nd U23 Liège–Bastogne–Liège
5th Overall Olympia's Tour
6th Overall Ringerike GP

1st Stage 1

2007
8th Grand Prix de la Ville de Lillers
2008
6th Fyen Rundt
2009
2nd Overall Rás Tailteann
9th Overall Rhône-Alpes Isère Tour
2010
2nd Overall Flèche du Sud

1st Stage 2

2011
3rd Time trial, National Road Championships
2012
1st Mountains classification, Tour of the Basque Country
6th Overall Tour de l'Ain
7th Clásica de San Sebastián
2013
8th Overall Circuit de la Sarthe
