= Jesús Hernández (cyclist) =

Spanish road bicycle racer

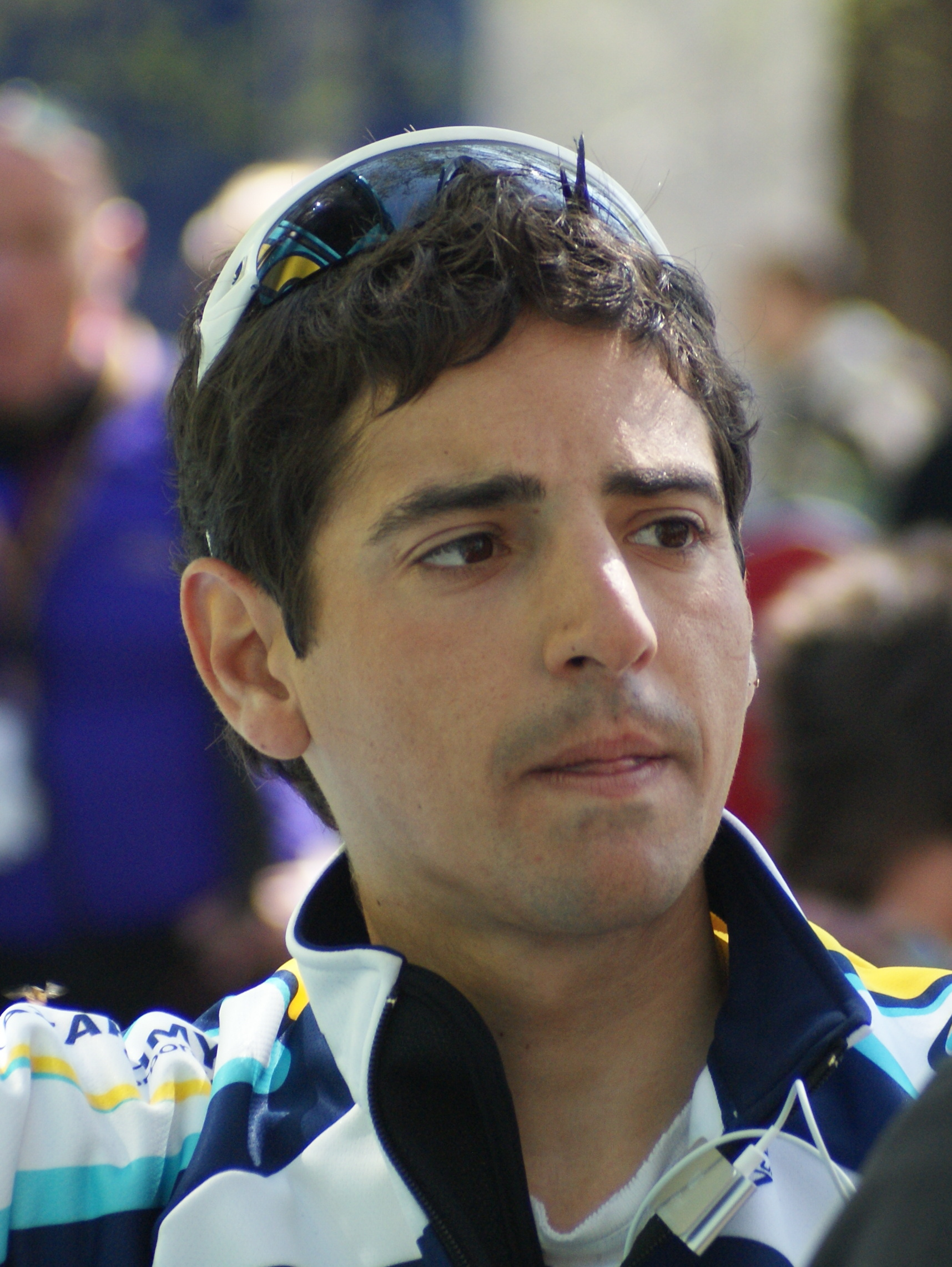
- Hernández at the 2009 Vuelta a Castilla y León

Personal information
- Full name: Jesús Hernández Blázquez
- Born: 28 September 1981 (age 45) Ávila, Spain
- Height: 1.70 m (5 ft 7 in)
- Weight: 58 kg (128 lb; 9.1 st)

Cycling career
- Sport: Cycling
- Current team: Team Polti VisitMalta
- Discipline: Road
- Role: Rider (retired); Directeur sportif
- Rider type: Climbing specialist

Amateur teams
- 2002: ONCE–Eroski (stagiaire)
- 2003: FDB-Würth-ONCE

Professional teams
- 2004–2005: Liberty Seguros
- 2006–2007: Relax–GAM
- 2009–2010: Astana
- 2011–2016: Saxo Bank–SunGard
- 2017: Trek–Segafredo

Managerial team
- 2018–: Polartec–Kometa

Jesús Hernández Blázquez (born 28 September 1981) is a Spanish former road bicycle racer, who competed professionally between 2004 and 2017, for the Liberty Seguros–Würth, Relax–GAM, Astana, Tinkoff and Trek–Segafredo teams. He now works as a directeur sportif for UCI Continental team Team Polti VisitMalta.

== Career ==
Born in Ávila, Hernández turned professional in 2004, and has taken part in the Vuelta a España three times, but withdrew on the first two occasions during the third week. He finished 19th in the 2009 event.

He is well known as being the long-term friend and domestique of Alberto Contador, accompanying Contador at each of his last four teams as a professional cyclist. During the Astana years Lance Armstrong applied to him the nickname "Sweet baby Jesus".

He rode his first Tour de France in 2010 with Astana being part of Contador's winning team, although that title was later stripped.

== Major results ==
2005
9th Overall Tour de Langkawi
10th Prueba Villafranca de Ordizia
2006
5th Prueba Villafranca de Ordizia
9th Gran Premio de Llodio

=== Grand Tour general classification results timeline ===
Grand Tour	2006	2007	2008	2009	2010	2011	2012	2013	2014	2015	2016	2017
Giro d'Italia	—	—	—	—	—	27	—	—	—	—	59	49
Tour de France	—	—	—	—	138	90	—	43	DNF	—	—	—
Vuelta a España	DNF	DNF	—	19	—	—	43	—	21	—	43	64

Legend
—	Did not compete
DNF	Did not finish
