= Jonas Aaen Jørgensen =

Danish racing cyclist

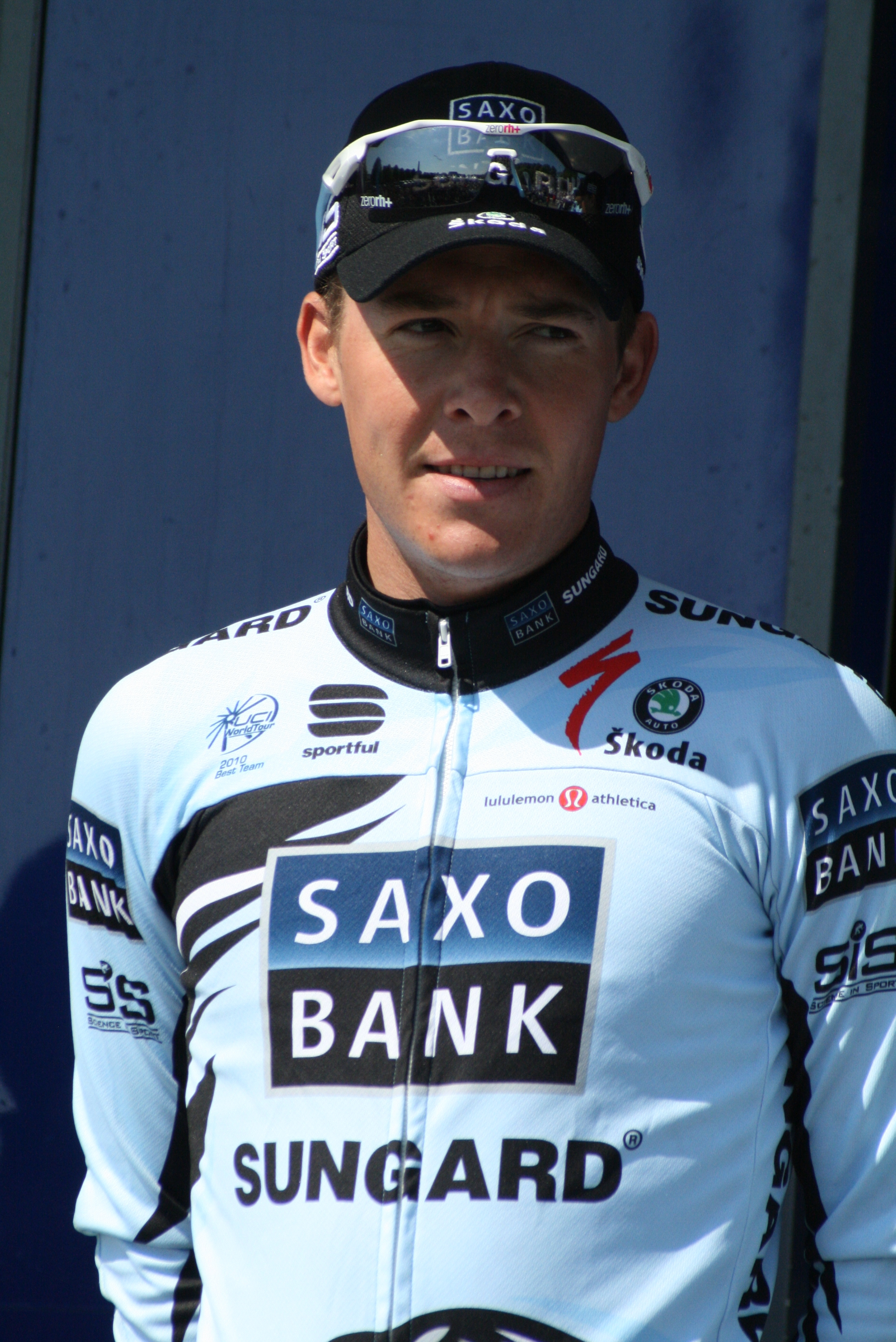
- Jørgensen at the 2011 Four Days of Dunkirk

Personal information
- Full name: Jonas Aaen Jørgensen
- Born: 20 April 1986 (age 40)
- Height: 1.74 m (5 ft 9 in)
- Weight: 63 kg (139 lb; 9.9 st)

Cycling career
- Sport: Cycling
- Current team: Retired
- Discipline: Road
- Role: Rider
- Rider type: All-rounder

Professional teams
- 2006–2008: Team GLS
- 2009: Team Capinordic
- 2010–2013: Team Saxo Bank
- 2014–2019: Riwal Cycling Team

Jonas Aaen Jørgensen (born 20 April 1986) is a Danish former professional road bicycle racer, who rode professionally between 2006 and 2019 for the Team GLS, Team Capinordic, Saxo–Tinkoff and Riwal Readynez squads.

== Career ==
Jørgensen participated in Amstel Gold Race, La Flèche Wallonne and Liège–Bastogne–Liège in 2010.

== Major results ==
2006
2nd GP Palio del Recioto
2007
1st Grote Prijs Stad Zottegem
1st Stage 2 Grand Prix du Portugal
2nd GP Cristal Energie
3rd National Road Race Championships
6th Overall Triptyque des Monts et Châteaux

1st Stage 2b

8th Colliers Classic
10th Grand Prix d'Isbergues
2008
1st Vlaamse Havenpijl
3rd Boucles du Sud Ardèche
3rd GP Nordjylland
5th Druivenkoers Overijse
6th Overall Ringerike GP
8th Münsterland Giro
9th Tour de Rijke
2009
1st Scandinavian Race
Tour de Slovaquie

1st Stages 4 & 5

1st Stage 1 Tour du Loir-Et-Cher
1st Stage 1 Ringerike GP
9th Omloop van het Houtland
2010
6th Binche–Tournai–Binche
7th Trofeo Magalluf-Palmanova
7th Le Samyn
2011
1st Grand Prix d'Isbergues
3rd Overall Herald Sun Tour
2012
8th Overall Paris–Corrèze
2013
10th Ronde van Drenthe
2014
1st Scandinavian Race
4th Dorpenomloop Rucphen
