= Chris Anker Sørensen =

Danish road bicycle racer (1984–2021)

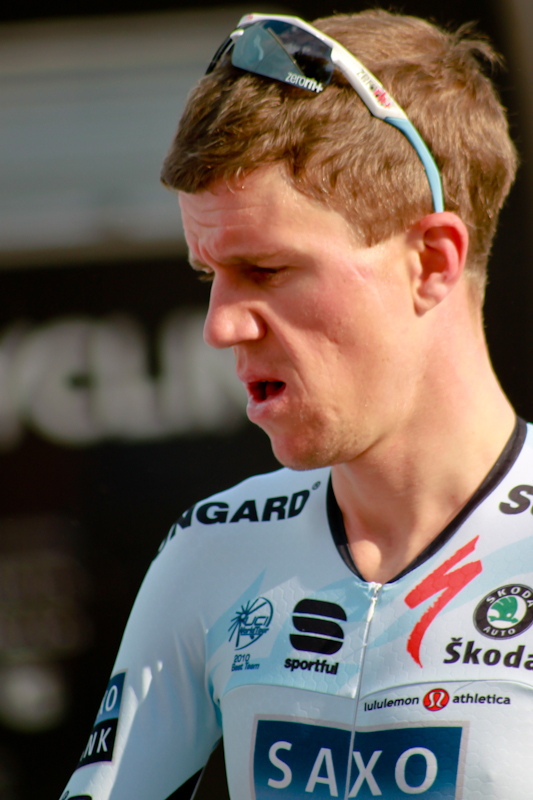
- Sørensen at the 2011 Tour de Romandie

Personal information
- Nicknames: Oksen fra Hammel; (English: The Ox from Hammel)
- Born: 5 September 1984 Hammel, Denmark
- Died: 18 September 2021 (aged 37) Zeebrugge, Belgium
- Height: 1.85 m (6 ft 1 in)
- Weight: 64 kg (141 lb)

Cycling career
- Sport: Cycling
- Discipline: Road
- Role: Rider; Directeur sportif
- Rider type: Climbing specialist

Amateur team
- 2001–2004: Hammel CK

Professional teams
- 2005–2006: Team Designa Køkken
- 2005: → Team CSC (stagiaire)
- 2007–2015: Team CSC
- 2016: Fortuneo–Vital Concept
- 2017–2018: Riwal Platform

Managerial team
- 2019–2021: Riwal Readynez

Major wins
- Grand Tours Tour de France Combativity award (2012) Giro d'Italia 1 individual stage (2010) One-Day Races and Classics National Road Race Championships (2015)

Chris Anker Sørensen (Danish pronunciation: [ˈkʰʁis ˈɑŋkɐ ˈsɶɐ̯ˀn̩sn̩]; 5 September 1984 – 18 September 2021) was a Danish road bicycle racer who rode professionally between 2005 and 2018 for the Team Designa Køkken, Tinkoff–Saxo, Fortuneo–Vital Concept, and Riwal Platform teams. Sørensen then worked as a directeur sportif (and co-owner) for his final professional team, Riwal Readynez.

== Career ==
Born in Hammel, Sørensen had a promising performance in the 2008 Tour of Austria, finishing fourth overall. A few weeks later, he competed for Denmark (along with Nicki Sørensen and Brian Vandborg) in the 2008 Olympic road race, finishing 12th overall.

Starting with the 2010 season, Sørensen, who lived in Luxembourg, rode under a Luxembourg license, since the UCI no longer allowed the Danish federation to grant Danish licenses to riders living abroad. During the season, he won Stage 8 of the Giro d'Italia.

In the 2012 Tour de France, Sørensen finished 14th overall and was awarded the super-combativity award after an attacking performance in several mountain stages.

In September 2015, it was announced that he would leave Tinkoff–Saxo and join Fortuneo–Vital Concept for the 2016 season, with a role to support Eduardo Sepúlveda in Grand Tours.

In February 2018, he announced his retirement at the end of the season.

== Personal life ==
He commentated on TV 2 (Denmark) from 2017 until his death.

=== Death ===
On 18 September 2021, Sørensen was killed by injuries sustained by being struck by a van while on a bike ride in Zeebrugge, Belgium; he had been due to cover the 2021 UCI Road World Championships, which started the following day. According to a statement of the Brugge parket released on 19 September, Sørensen did not yield on a location where he needed to do so.

== Major results ==
2001
3rd Road race, National Junior Road Championships
2005
1st Stage 3 Ringerike GP
2006
4th Road race, UEC European Under-23 Road Championships
4th Overall Triptyque des Barrages
5th GP Demy–Cars
6th Grand Prix de Waregem
7th Omloop van het Waasland
8th Grand Prix Cristal Energie
2007
6th Overall Deutschland Tour

1st Stage 2 (TTT)

7th Rund um die Hainleite
2008
1st Stage 6 Critérium du Dauphiné Libéré
3rd Grand Prix d'Isbergues
4th Overall Tour of Austria

1st Stage 2

2009
1st Japan Cup
2nd Road race, National Road Championships
5th Overall Tour du Haut Var
6th GP Miguel Induráin
8th Giro dell'Emilia
2010
1st Stage 8 Giro d'Italia
3rd Overall Tour of Slovenia
5th Road race, National Road Championships
6th Overall Tour du Haut Var
2011
1st Mountains classification Tour de Romandie
5th Road race, National Road Championships
6th Liège–Bastogne–Liège
8th Overall Tour du Haut Var
2012
1st Mountains classification Volta a Catalunya
5th Road race, National Road Championships
5th Giro dell'Emilia
8th Milano–Torino
Combativity award Overall Tour de France
2013
2nd Giro dell'Emilia
10th Overall Tour de Pologne
2015
1st Road race, National Road Championships
9th Overall Tour of Britain
2016
5th Overall Tour La Provence
2017
4th Overall Kreiz Breizh Elites
9th Sundvolden GP
2018
10th Lillehammer GP

=== Grand Tour general classification results timeline ===
Grand Tour	2007	2008	2009	2010	2011	2012	2013	2014	2015	2016
Giro d'Italia	—	28	—	27	—	—	—	DNF	—	—
Tour de France	—	—	34	69	37	14	—	—	—	84
Vuelta a España	19	—	—	—	12	—	18	29	—	—

== See also ==
- List of racing cyclists and pacemakers with a cycling-related death
