= 2011 Danmark Rundt =

2010–2011 UCI Europe Tour
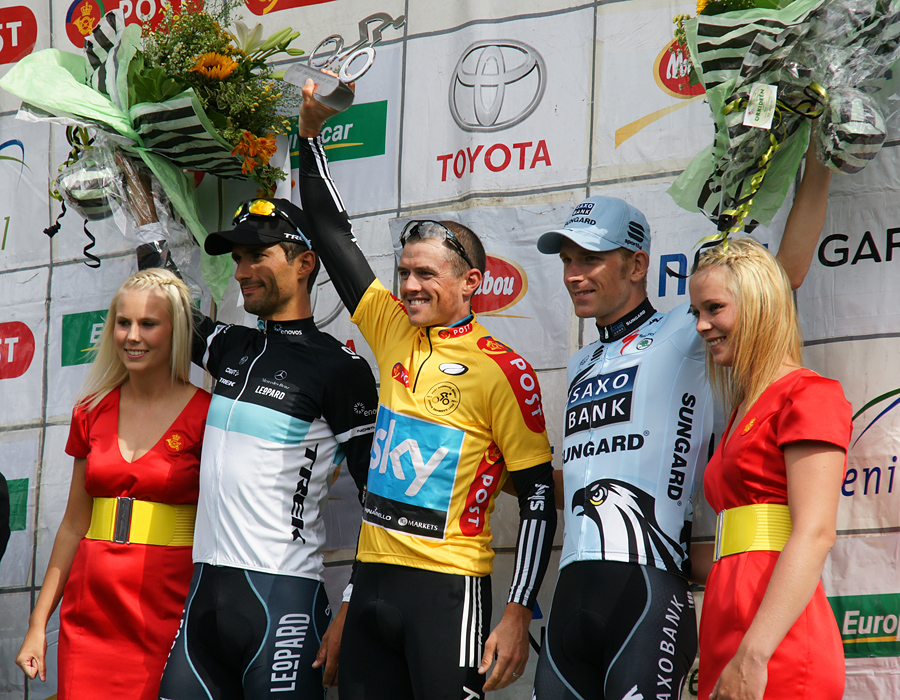
- Winner Simon Gerrans (Sky), runner-up Daniele Bennati (Leopard-Trek) and no. 3 Michael Mørkøv (Saxo Bank-Sunguard)

Race details
- Dates: August 3–7, 2011
- Stages: 6
- Distance: 825.9 km (513.2 mi)
- Winning time: 19h 12' 01"

Results
| Jersey awarded to the overall winner | Winner | Simon Gerrans (Australia) | (Team Sky) |
| | Second | Daniele Bennati (Italy) | (Leopard Trek) |
| | Third | Michael Mørkøv (Denmark) | (Saxo Bank–SunGard) |
| Jersey awarded to the points classification winner | Points | Sacha Modolo (Italy) | (Colnago–CSF Inox) |
| Jersey awarded to the mountains classification winner | Mountains | Michael Reihs (Denmark) | (Christina Watches–Onfone) |
| Jersey awarded to the youth classification winner | Youth | Jérôme Cousin (France) | (Team Europcar) |
| | Team | Team Sky | |

The 2011 Danmark Rundt was a men's road bicycle race held from 3 to 7 August 2011. It was the 21st edition of the men's stage race to be held, which was established in 1985. Australian rider Simon Gerrans of Team Sky captured the overall title. This was the 2nd Australian Post Danmark Rundt victory.

== Schedule ==
| Stage | Route | Distance | Date | Winner |
|---|---|---|---|---|
| 1 | Esbjerg > Esbjerg | 171.1 km | August 3 | Sacha Modolo (ITA) |
| 2 | Grindsted > Aarhus | 189.1 km | August 4 | Rémi Cusin (FRA) |
| 3 | Aahus > Vejle | 181.3 km | August 5 | Jakob Fuglsang (DEN) |
| 4 | Sorø > Frederiksværk | 112.2 km | August 6 | Sacha Modolo (ITA) |
| 5 (ITT) | Helsingør > Helsingør | 13.2 km | August 6 | Richie Porte (AUS) |
| 6 | Hillerød > Frederiksberg | 159 km | August 7 | Theo Bos (NED) |

== Teams ==
16 teams were invited to the 2011 Danmark Rundt: 6 teams from the UCI ProTeams, 6 UCI Professional Continental Teams, 3 UCI Continental Teams along with the Danish national team under the Team Post Danmark name.

UCI ProTeams
- (Denmark) Saxo Bank–SunGard
- (Luxembourg) Leopard Trek
- (Netherlands) Rabobank
- (Netherlands) Vacansoleil–DCM
- (United States) Garmin–Cervélo
- (United Kingdom) Team Sky
UCI Professional Continental Teams
- (Italy) Colnago–CSF Inox
- (Spain) Geox–TMC
- (France) Cofidis
- (Belgium) Topsport Vlaanderen–Mercator
- (France) Team Europcar
- (United States) Team Type 1–Sanofi
UCI Continental Teams
- (Denmark) Team Concordia
- (Denmark) Glud & Marstrand-LRØ Rådgivning
- (Denmark) Christina Watches–Onfone
National Team
- (Denmark) Team Post Danmark

== Stages ==
=== Stage 1 ===
3 August 2011 – Esbjerg to Esbjerg, 171.1 km (106.3 mi)

Stage 1 Result

| | Rider | Team | Time |
|---|---|---|---|
| 1 | Sacha Modolo (ITA) | Colnago–CSF Inox | 3h 59' 21" |
| 2 | Matti Breschel (DEN) | Rabobank | s.t. |
| 3 | Michael Mørkøv (DEN) | Saxo Bank–SunGard | s.t. |
| 4 | Daniele Colli (ITA) | Geox–TMC | s.t. |
| 5 | Andrea Pasqualon (ITA) | Colnago–CSF Inox | s.t. |
| 6 | Daniele Bennati (ITA) | Leopard Trek | s.t. |
| 7 | Angelo Furlan (ITA) | Christina Watches–Onfone | s.t. |
| 8 | Michael Van Staeyen (BEL) | Topsport Vlaanderen–Mercator | s.t. |
| 9 | Pim Ligthart (NED) | Vacansoleil–DCM | s.t. |
| 10 | Óscar Freire (ESP) | Rabobank | s.t. |

General Classification after Stage 1

| | Rider | Team | Time |
|---|---|---|---|
| 1 | Sacha Modolo (ITA) | Colnago–CSF Inox | 3h 59' 11" |
| 2 | Michael Mørkøv (DEN) | Saxo Bank–SunGard | + 3" |
| 3 | Matti Breschel (DEN) | Rabobank | + 4" |
| 4 | Nikola Aistrup (DEN) | Team Concordia Forsikring-Himmerland | + 7" |
| 5 | René Jørgensen (DEN) | Christina Watches–Onfone | + 8" |
| 6 | Kris Boeckmans (BEL) | Topsport Vlaanderen–Mercator | + 8" |
| 7 | Pim Ligthart (NED) | Vacansoleil–DCM | + 9" |
| 8 | Daniele Colli (ITA) | Geox–TMC | + 10" |
| 9 | Andrea Pasqualon (ITA) | Colnago–CSF Inox | + 10" |
| 10 | Daniele Bennati (ITA) | Leopard Trek | + 10" |

=== Stage 2 ===
4 August 2011 – Grindsted to Aarhus, 189.1 km (117.5 mi)

Stage 2 Result

| | Rider | Team | Time |
|---|---|---|---|
| 1 | Rémi Cusin (FRA) | Cofidis | 4h 34' 19" |
| 2 | Matti Breschel (DEN) | Rabobank | s.t. |
| 3 | Daniele Bennati (ITA) | Leopard Trek | + 2" |
| 4 | Sacha Modolo (ITA) | Colnago–CSF Inox | + 2" |
| 5 | Daniele Colli (ITA) | Geox–TMC | + 2" |
| 6 | Jure Kocjan (SLO) | Team Type 1–Sanofi | + 2" |
| 7 | Angelo Furlan (ITA) | Christina Watches–Onfone | + 2" |
| 8 | Michael Van Staeyen (BEL) | Topsport Vlaanderen–Mercator | + 2" |
| 9 | Marcello Pavarin (ITA) | Vacansoleil–DCM | + 2" |
| 10 | Adrien Petit (FRA) | Cofidis | + 2" |

General Classification after Stage 2

| | Rider | Team | Time |
|---|---|---|---|
| 1 | Matti Breschel (DEN) | Rabobank | 8h 33' 28" |
| 2 | Sacha Modolo (ITA) | Colnago–CSF Inox | + 4" |
| 3 | Michael Mørkøv (DEN) | Saxo Bank–SunGard | + 7" |
| 4 | Daniele Bennati (ITA) | Leopard Trek | + 10" |
| 5 | Nikola Aistrup (DEN) | Team Concordia Forsikring-Himmerland | + 11" |
| 6 | René Jørgensen (DEN) | Christina Watches–Onfone | + 12" |
| 7 | Kris Boeckmans (BEL) | Topsport Vlaanderen–Mercator | + 12" |
| 8 | Pim Ligthart (NED) | Vacansoleil–DCM | + 13" |
| 9 | Bert-Jan Lindeman (NED) | Vacansoleil–DCM | + 13" |
| 10 | Daniele Colli (ITA) | Geox–TMC | + 14" |

=== Stage 3 ===
5 August 2011 – Aarhus to Vejle, 181.3 km (112.7 mi)

Stage 3 Result

| | Rider | Team | Time |
|---|---|---|---|
| 1 | Jakob Fuglsang (DEN) | Leopard Trek | 4h 29' 38" |
| 2 | Simon Gerrans (AUS) | Team Sky | + 2" |
| 3 | Daniele Bennati (ITA) | Leopard Trek | + 11" |
| 4 | Niki Østergaard (DEN) | Glud & Marstrand-LRØ Rådgivning | + 13" |
| 5 | Bert-Jan Lindeman (NED) | Vacansoleil–DCM | + 13" |
| 6 | Rémi Cusin (FRA) | Cofidis | + 13" |
| 7 | Michael Mørkøv (DEN) | Saxo Bank–SunGard | + 13" |
| 8 | Matti Breschel (DEN) | Rabobank | + 13" |
| 9 | Stefan Denifl (AUT) | Leopard Trek | + 13" |
| 10 | Damien Gaudin (FRA) | Team Europcar | + 13" |

General Classification after Stage 3

| | Rider | Team | Time |
|---|---|---|---|
| 1 | Simon Gerrans (AUS) | Team Sky | 13h 03' 15" |
| 2 | Matti Breschel (DEN) | Rabobank | + 4" |
| 3 | Daniele Bennati (ITA) | Leopard Trek | + 8" |
| 4 | Michael Mørkøv (DEN) | Saxo Bank–SunGard | + 9" |
| 5 | Bert-Jan Lindeman (NED) | Vacansoleil–DCM | + 17" |
| 6 | Daniele Colli (ITA) | Geox–TMC | + 18" |
| 7 | Niki Østergaard (DEN) | Glud & Marstrand-LRØ Rådgivning | + 18" |
| 8 | Damien Gaudin (FRA) | Team Europcar | + 18" |
| 9 | Dario Cioni (ITA) | Team Sky | + 18" |
| 10 | Jérôme Cousin (FRA) | Team Europcar | + 18" |

=== Stage 4 ===
6 August 2011 – Sorø to Frederiksværk, 112.2 km (69.7 mi)

Stage 4 Result

| | Rider | Team | Time |
|---|---|---|---|
| 1 | Sacha Modolo (ITA) | Colnago–CSF Inox | 2h 25' 20" |
| 2 | Jure Kocjan (SLO) | Team Type 1–Sanofi | s.t. |
| 3 | Daniele Bennati (ITA) | Leopard Trek | s.t. |
| 4 | Manuel Belletti (ITA) | Colnago–CSF Inox | s.t. |
| 5 | Pim Ligthart (NED) | Vacansoleil–DCM | s.t. |
| 6 | Matti Breschel (DEN) | Rabobank | s.t. |
| 7 | Daniele Colli (ITA) | Geox–TMC | s.t. |
| 8 | Michael Van Staeyen (BEL) | Topsport Vlaanderen–Mercator | s.t. |
| 9 | Alessandro Bazzana (ITA) | Team Type 1–Sanofi | s.t. |
| 10 | Michael Mørkøv (DEN) | Saxo Bank–SunGard | s.t. |

General Classification after Stage 4

| | Rider | Team | Time |
|---|---|---|---|
| 1 | Simon Gerrans (AUS) | Team Sky | 15h 28' 35" |
| 2 | Matti Breschel (DEN) | Rabobank | + 4" |
| 3 | Daniele Bennati (ITA) | Leopard Trek | + 6" |
| 4 | Michael Mørkøv (DEN) | Saxo Bank–SunGard | + 9" |
| 5 | Bert-Jan Lindeman (NED) | Vacansoleil–DCM | + 17" |
| 6 | Daniele Colli (ITA) | Geox–TMC | + 18" |
| 7 | Niki Østergaard (DEN) | Glud & Marstrand-LRØ Rådgivning | + 18" |
| 8 | Damien Gaudin (FRA) | Team Europcar | + 18" |
| 9 | Jérôme Cousin (FRA) | Team Europcar | + 18" |
| 10 | Dario Cioni (ITA) | Team Sky | + 27" |

=== Stage 5 ===
6 August 2011 – Helsingør to Helsingør, 13.2 km (8.2 mi) individual time trial (ITT)

Stage 5 Result

| | Rider | Team | Time |
|---|---|---|---|
| 1 | Richie Porte (AUS) | Saxo Bank–SunGard | 15' 09" |
| 2 | Gustav Larsson (SWE) | Saxo Bank–SunGard | + 10" |
| 3 | Alex Dowsett (GBR) | Team Sky | + 17" |
| 4 | Rasmus Quaade (DEN) | Team Concordia Forsikring-Himmerland | + 24" |
| 5 | Simon Gerrans (AUS) | Team Sky | + 29" |
| 6 | Jack Bobridge (AUS) | Garmin–Cervélo | + 30" |
| 7 | Daniele Bennati (ITA) | Leopard Trek | + 31" |
| 8 | Jakob Fuglsang (DEN) | Leopard Trek | + 35" |
| 9 | Grischa Niermann (GER) | Rabobank | + 37" |
| 10 | Damien Gaudin (FRA) | Team Europcar | + 41" |

General Classification after Stage 5

| | Rider | Team | Time |
|---|---|---|---|
| 1 | Simon Gerrans (AUS) | Team Sky | 15h 44' 13" |
| 2 | Daniele Bennati (ITA) | Leopard Trek | + 8" |
| 3 | Michael Mørkøv (DEN) | Saxo Bank–SunGard | + 26" |
| 4 | Damien Gaudin (FRA) | Team Europcar | + 30" |
| 5 | Alex Dowsett (GBR) | Team Sky | + 38" |
| 6 | Dario Cioni (ITA) | Team Sky | + 46" |
| 7 | Jérôme Cousin (FRA) | Team Europcar | + 54" |
| 8 | Daniele Colli (ITA) | Geox–TMC | + 55" |
| 9 | Zico Waeytens (BEL) | Topsport Vlaanderen–Mercator | + 1'10" |
| 10 | Sébastien Turgot (FRA) | Team Europcar | + 1'11" |

=== Stage 6 ===
7 August 2011 – Hillerød to Frederiksberg, 159 km (99 mi)

Stage 6 Result

| | Rider | Team | Time |
|---|---|---|---|
| 1 | Theo Bos (NED) | Rabobank | 3h 27' 51" |
| 2 | Sacha Modolo (ITA) | Colnago–CSF Inox | s.t. |
| 3 | Manuel Belletti (ITA) | Colnago–CSF Inox | s.t. |
| 4 | Gorik Gardeyn (BEL) | Vacansoleil–DCM | s.t. |
| 5 | Angelo Furlan (ITA) | Christina Watches–Onfone | s.t. |
| 6 | Daniele Colli (ITA) | Geox–TMC | s.t. |
| 7 | Adrien Petit (FRA) | Cofidis | s.t. |
| 8 | Sébastien Turgot (FRA) | Team Europcar | s.t. |
| 9 | Alberto Ongarato (ITA) | Vacansoleil–DCM | s.t. |
| 10 | Casper Degn Larsen (DEN) | Team Post Danmark | s.t. |

Final General Classification

| | Rider | Team | Time |
|---|---|---|---|
| 1 | Simon Gerrans (AUS) | Team Sky | 19h 12' 01" |
| 2 | Daniele Bennati (ITA) | Leopard Trek | + 9" |
| 3 | Michael Mørkøv (DEN) | Saxo Bank–SunGard | + 29" |
| 4 | Damien Gaudin (FRA) | Team Europcar | + 33" |
| 5 | Alex Dowsett (GBR) | Team Sky | + 41" |
| 6 | Dario Cioni (ITA) | Team Sky | + 49" |
| 7 | Jérôme Cousin (FRA) | Team Europcar | + 57" |
| 8 | Daniele Colli (ITA) | Geox–TMC | + 58" |
| 9 | Zico Waeytens (BEL) | Topsport Vlaanderen–Mercator | + 1'13" |
| 10 | Sébastien Turgot (FRA) | Team Europcar | + 1'14" |

== Classification leadership ==
| Stage | Winner | General classification | Points classification | Mountains classification | Young rider classification | Team classification |
|---|---|---|---|---|---|---|
| 1 | Sacha Modolo | Sacha Modolo | Sacha Modolo | Alessandro Bazzana | Zico Waeytens | Colnago–CSF Inox |
| 2 | Rémi Cusin | Matti Breschel | Sacha Modolo | Michael Reihs | Bert-Jan Lindeman | Rabobank |
| 3 | Jakob Fuglsang | Simon Gerrans | Matti Breschel | Martin Pedersen | Bert-Jan Lindeman | Leopard Trek |
| 4 | Sacha Modolo | Simon Gerrans | Sacha Modolo | Martin Pedersen | Bert-Jan Lindeman | Team Europcar |
| 5 | Richie Porte | Simon Gerrans | Daniele Bennati | Martin Pedersen | Jérôme Cousin | Team Sky |
| 6 | Theo Bos | Simon Gerrans | Sacha Modolo | Michael Reihs | Jérôme Cousin | Team Sky |
| Final | | Simon Gerrans | Sacha Modolo | Michael Reihs | Jérôme Cousin | Team Sky |

== Final standings ==
=== General classification ===
| | Rider | Team | Time |
|---|---|---|---|
| 1 | Simon Gerrans (AUS) | Team Sky | 19h 12' 01" |
| 2 | Daniele Bennati (ITA) | Leopard Trek | + 9" |
| 3 | Michael Mørkøv (DEN) | Saxo Bank–SunGard | + 29" |
| 4 | Damien Gaudin (FRA) | Team Europcar | + 33" |
| 5 | Alex Dowsett (GBR) | Team Sky | + 41" |
| 6 | Dario Cioni (ITA) | Team Sky | + 49" |
| 7 | Jérôme Cousin (FRA) | Team Europcar | + 57" |
| 8 | Daniele Colli (ITA) | Geox–TMC | + 58" |
| 9 | Zico Waeytens (BEL) | Topsport Vlaanderen–Mercator | + 1'13" |
| 10 | Sébastien Turgot (FRA) | Team Europcar | + 1'14" |

=== Points classification ===
| | Rider | Team | Points |
|---|---|---|---|
| 1 | Sacha Modolo (ITA) | Colnago–CSF Inox | 51 |
| 2 | Daniele Bennati (ITA) | Leopard Trek | 48 |
| 3 | Daniele Colli (ITA) | Geox–TMC | 30 |
| 4 | Michael Mørkøv (DEN) | Saxo Bank–SunGard | 28 |
| 5 | Simon Gerrans (AUS) | Team Sky | 26 |
| 6 | Jakob Fuglsang (DEN) | Leopard Trek | 25 |
| 7 | Pim Ligthart (NED) | Vacansoleil–DCM | 23 |
| 8 | Rémi Cusin (FRA) | Cofidis | 22 |
| 9 | Angelo Furlan (ITA) | Christina Watches–Onfone | 20 |
| 10 | Jure Kocjan (SLO) | Team Type 1–Sanofi | 19 |

=== Mountains classification ===
| | Rider | Team | Points |
|---|---|---|---|
| 1 | Michael Reihs (DEN) | Christina Watches–Onfone | 58 |
| 2 | Alessandro Bazzana (ITA) | Team Type 1–Sanofi | 44 |
| 3 | Martin Pedersen (DEN) | Leopard Trek | 40 |
| 4 | Lasse Bøchman (DEN) | Glud & Marstrand-LRØ Rådgivning | 22 |
| 5 | René Jørgensen (DEN) | Christina Watches–Onfone | 22 |
| 6 | Rasmus Guldhammer (DEN) | Team Concordia Forsikring-Himmerland | 18 |
| 7 | Martin Mortensen (DEN) | Leopard Trek | 12 |
| 8 | Niki Østergaard (DEN) | Glud & Marstrand-LRØ Rådgivning | 8 |
| 9 | Kurt Asle Arvesen (NOR) | Team Sky | 8 |
| 10 | Rolf Nyborg Broge (DEN) | Team Post Danmark | 8 |

=== Young rider classification ===
| | Rider | Team | Time |
|---|---|---|---|
| 1 | Jérôme Cousin (FRA) | Team Europcar | 19h 12' 58" |
| 2 | Zico Waeytens (BEL) | Topsport Vlaanderen–Mercator | + 16" |
| 3 | Bert-Jan Lindeman (NED) | Vacansoleil–DCM | + 46" |
| 4 | Asbjørn Kragh Andersen (DEN) | Team Post Danmark | + 1'45" |
| 5 | Jesper Hansen (DEN) | Team Post Danmark | + 3'25" |
| 6 | Matthias Brändle (AUT) | Geox–TMC | + 4'14" |
| 7 | Sebastian Lander (DEN) | Team Concordia Forsikring-Himmerland | + 4'38" |
| 8 | Thomas Nybo Riis (DEN) | Team Post Danmark | + 5'43" |
| 9 | Tomas Alberio (ITA) | Geox–TMC | + 7'55" |
| 10 | Christopher Juul-Jensen (DEN) | Glud & Marstrand-LRØ Rådgivning | + 8'48" |

=== Team classification ===
| Pos. | Team | Time |
|---|---|---|
| 1 | Team Sky | 57h 37' 43" |
| 2 | Saxo Bank–SunGard | + 10" |
| 3 | Leopard Trek | + 38" |
| 4 | Team Europcar | + 54" |
| 5 | Glud & Marstrand-LRØ Rådgivning | + 2'00" |
| 6 | Vacansoleil–DCM | + 2'24" |
| 7 | Rabobank | + 3'00" |
| 8 | Geox–TMC | + 4'04" |
| 9 | Team Type 1–Sanofi | + 8'04" |
| 10 | Cofidis | + 8'19" |
