= Grand Prix Cristal Energie =

Race details
- Date: August
- Region: Montmorillon, France
- Discipline: Road race
- Competition: UCI Europe Tour
- Type: One day race
- Organiser: US Argenton
- Race director: Denis Clément

History
- First edition: 1984
- Editions: 30
- Final edition: 2015
- First winner: Franck Boucanville (FRA)
- Most wins: Samuel Plouhinec (FRA) (2 wins)
- Final winner: Thomas Rostollan (FRA)

The Grand Prix Cristal Energie is a road bicycle race held annually in France. It was organized as a 1.2 event on the UCI Europe Tour from 2006 to 2009.

== Winners ==
Year	Winner	Second	Third
1984	(France) Franck Boucanville	(France) Pascal Audoux	(France) Jean-Luc Garnier
1985	No race		
1986	(France) Jean-Marie Lemoine	(France) Patrick Friou	(France) Philippe Pitrou
1987	(France) Nicolas Dubois	(France) Claude Carlin	(France) Bruno Bonnet
1988	(France) Patrick Friou	(France) Serge Bodin	(France) Thierry Barrault
1989	(France) Thierry Barrault	(France) Claude Carlin	(France) Philippe Delaurier
1990	(France) Félix Urbain	(France) Pierrick Gillereau	(France) Laurent Eudeline
1991	(Poland) Czeslaw Rajch	(France) Sylvain Bolay	(France) Stéphane Boury
1992	(France) Jean-Pierre Bourgeot	(Poland) Czeslaw Rajch	(France) Nicolas Jalabert
1993	(France) Walter Bénéteau	(France) Nicolas Jalabert	(France) Ludovic Auger
1994	(Poland) Jacek Bodyk	(France) Denis Marie	(Poland) Dariusz Wojciechowski
1995	(United Kingdom) Jeremy Hunt	(France) Gérald Liévin	(France) Jérôme Gannat
1996	(France) Vincent Cali	(Poland) Piotr Wadecki	(France) Christopher Jenner
1997	(Poland) Grzegorz Gwiazdowski	(France) Fabrice Parent	(France) Olivier Perraudeau
1998	(France) Franck Rénier	(France) Laurent Paumier	(France) Serge Barbara
1999	(France) Eric Drubay	(France) Gérald Marot	(France) Carlo Meneghetti
2000	(France) Ludovic Vanhee	(France) Alexandre Grux	(France) Frédéric Lecrosnier
2001	(Poland) Tomasz Kaszuba	(France) Stéphan Ravaleu	(Ukraine) Yuriy Metlushenko
2002	(France) Samuel Plouhinec	(Poland) Jacek Tadeusz Morajko	(France) Freddy Ravaleu
2003	(France) Samuel Plouhinec	(Finland) Mika Hietanen	(France) Tony Cavet
2004	(France) Benoît Luminet	(France) Maxime Mederel	(France) Jérôme Bouchet
2005	No race		
2006	(Spain) Carlos Torrent	(France) Mathieu Drujon	(Denmark) René Jørgensen
2007	(France) Florian Morizot	(Denmark) Jonas Aaen Jørgensen	(France) Médéric Clain
2008	(Namibia) Dan Craven	(France) Guillaume Bonnafond	(Poland) Jarosław Marycz
2009	(Denmark) Martin Pedersen	(Germany) Robert Retschke	(Denmark) Troels Vinther
2010	(France) Lilian Jégou	(Latvia) Herberts Pudans	(France) Thomas Girard
2011	(France) Renaud Pioline	(France) Arnaud Démare	(France) Bryan Nauleau
2012	(France) Bryan Coquard	(France) Warren Barguil	(France) Stéphane Rossetto
2013	(France) Benoît Daeninck	(France) Thomas Girard	(France) Maxime Renault
2014	(France) Yann Guyot	(France) Julien Duval	(France) Kévin Lalouette
2015	(France) Thomas Rostollan	(France) Alexandre Delétang	(France) Fabien Grellier
