= Boucle de l'Artois =

Race details
- Date: April
- Region: Pas-de-Calais, France
- Discipline: Road race
- Competition: UCI Europe Tour
- Type: One day race
- Web site: www.boucledelartois.fr

History
- First edition: 1990
- Editions: 35 (as of 2026)
- First winner: William Perard (FRA)
- Most wins: Jean-Michel Thilloy (FRA) (3 wins)
- Most recent: Cériel Desal (BEL)

The Boucle de l'Artois is a road bicycle race held annually in France. It was organized as a 2.2 event on the UCI Europe Tour from 2005 to 2009 and again in 2013. In 2025 the race was run as a UCI men's elite 1.2 event.

== Winners ==
Year	Winner	Second	Third
1990	(France) William Perard	(France) Laurent Eudeline	(France) Eric Lavaud
1991	(France) Jean-François Laffillée	(France) Franck Morelle	(France) Philippe Lauraire
1992	(France) Laurent Davion	(France) Jean-François Laffillée	(France) Claude Lamour
1993	(France) Didier Faivre-Pierret	(France) Michel Lallouët	(France) Hervé Boussard
1994	(Belgium) Danny In 't Ven	(France) Franck Morelle	(Belgium) Fabrice Naessens
1995	(France) Jean-François Laffillée	(France) Laurent Lefèvre	(France) Jean-Michel Thilloy
1996	(France) Jean-Michel Thilloy	(Belgium) Marc Streel	(Ukraine) Alexei Nakazny
1997	(Belgium) Christophe Detilloux	(France) Carlo Meneghetti	(France) Franck Morelle
1998	(France) Jean-Michel Thilloy	(France) Ludovic Vanhee	(France) Jean-Claude Thilloy
1999	(France) Jean-Michel Thilloy	(France) Jean-Claude Thilloy	(France) Gaël Moreau
2000	(France) Olivier Lenaic	(France) Renaud Dion	(France) Stéphane Auroux
2001	(France) Christophe Laurent	(France) Guillaume Laloux	(France) Carlo Meneghetti
2002	(France) Noan Lelarge	(Sweden) Mattias Carlsson	(Japan) Takehiro Mizutani
2003	(Belgium) Koen Das	(Italy) Renzo Mazzoleni	(France) Frédéric Mille
2004	(Finland) Jussi Veikkanen	(Belgium) Kenny De Block	(France) Yann Pivois
2005	(France) Jérôme Bouchet	(Australia) David Tanner	(Russia) Alexandre Sabalin
2006	(Russia) Alexander Khatuntsev	(Russia) Sergey Kolesnikov	(France) Médéric Clain
2007	(Russia) Andrey Klyuev	(Denmark) René Jørgensen	(Denmark) Michael Reihs
2008	(Russia) Timofey Kritskiy	(France) Thomas Bodo	(Denmark) Martin Mortensen
2009	(Russia) Sergey Firsanov	(France) Dimitri Champion	(Belgium) Frank Vandenbroucke
2010	(Lithuania) Evaldas Šiškevičius	(France) Julien Belgy	(France) Kévin Lalouette
2011	(France) Pierre-Luc Périchon	(France) Samuel Plouhinec	(France) Romain Guillemois
2012	(France) Sylvain Blanquefort	(France) Maxime Daniel	(France) Benoît Sinner
2013	(Sweden) Fredrik Ludvigsson	(Netherlands) Berden de Vries	(Denmark) André Steensen
2014	(France) Thibault Nuns	(Germany) Nico Denz	(France) Bruno Armirail
2015	(Norway) Håvard Blikra	(Latvia) Andris Smirnovs	(Greece) Charalampos Kastrantas
2016	(France) Yoann Paillot	(France) Nans Peters	(France) Dylan Kowalski
2017	(Australia) Benjamin Dyball	(France) Samuel Plouhinec	(Netherlands) Piotr Havik
2018	(France) Romain Bacon	(France) Fabien Schmidt	(Spain) Adrià Moreno
2019	(France) Louis Louvet	(Belgium) Sten Van Gucht	(France) Maxime Chevalier
2020-2021	Cancelled		
2022	(France) Benjamin Marais	(France) Antoine Devanne	(France) Bastien Tronchon
2023	(France) Pierre Thierry	(Bermuda) Kaden Hopkins	(France) Antonin Souchon
2024	(United Kingdom) Bjoern Koerdt	(France) Léandre Huck	(France) Louis Coqueret
2025	(New Zealand) Lewis Bower	(Australia) Matthew Fox	(Austria) Sebastian Putz
2026	(Belgium) Cériel Desal	(Finland) Axel Källenberg	(Canada) Léo Roy
