= 2012 Danmark Rundt =

2012 UCI Europe Tour
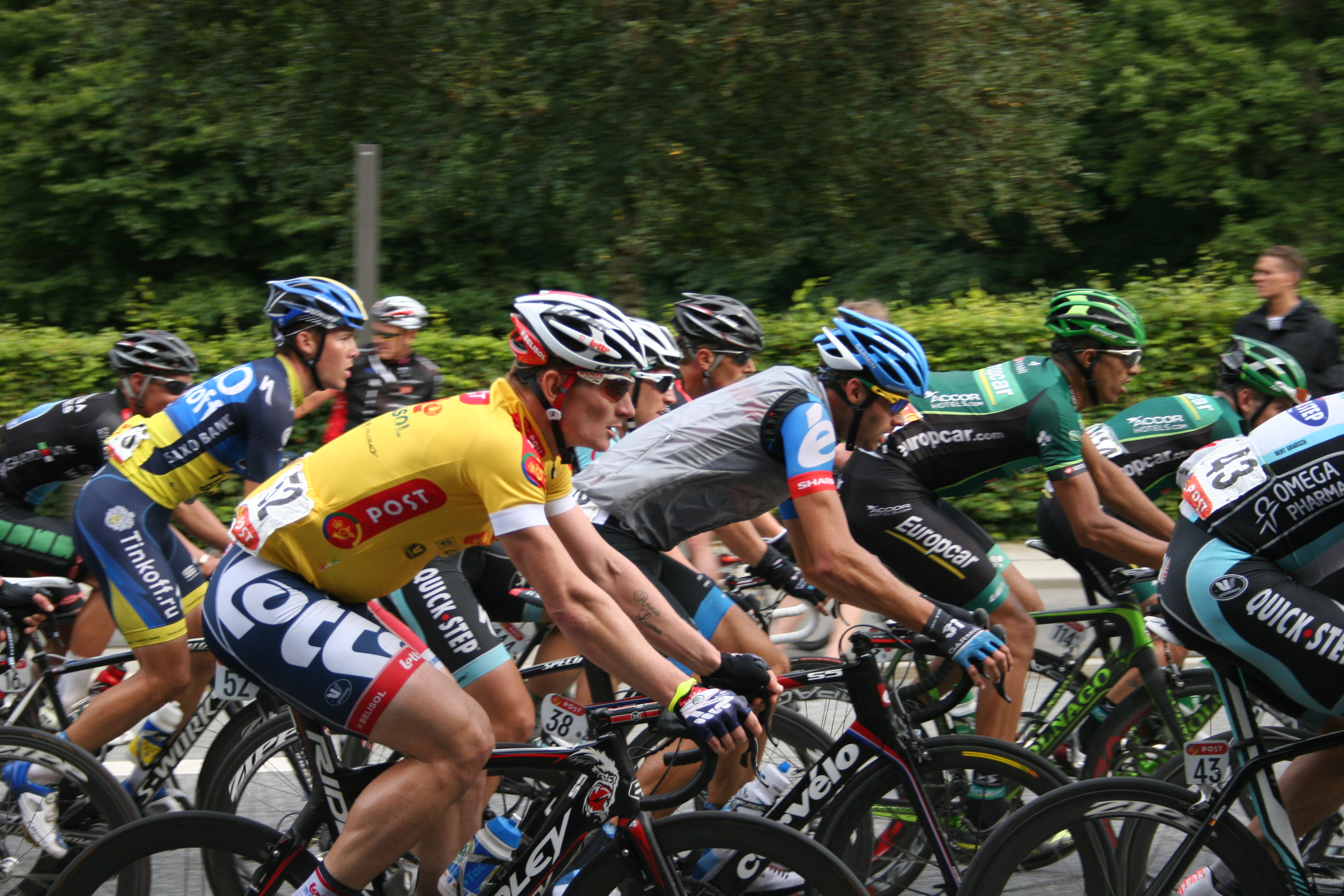
- André Greipel at Post Danmark Rundt 2012, stage 2, Aarhus

Race details
- Dates: 22–26 August 2012
- Stages: 6
- Distance: 856.5 km (532.2 mi)
- Winning time: 20h 41' 47"

Results
Jersey awarded to the overall winner	Winner	Lieuwe Westra (NED)	(Vacansoleil–DCM)
	Second	Ramūnas Navardauskas (LTU)	(Garmin–Sharp)
	Third	Manuele Boaro (ITA)	(Saxo Bank–Tinkoff Bank)
Jersey awarded to the points classification winner	Points	Alexander Kristoff (NOR)	(Team Katusha)
Jersey awarded to the mountains classification winner	Mountains	Nikola Aistrup (DEN)	(Forsikring–Himmerland)
Jersey awarded to the young rider classification winner	Young rider	Wilco Kelderman (NED)	(Rabobank)
	Team	Team Sky	

The 2012 Danmark Rundt was a men's road bicycle race held from 22 to 26 August 2012. It was the 22nd edition of the men's stage race, which was established in 1985. The race was rated as a 2.HC event and formed part of the 2012 UCI Europe Tour.

The race was won by Dutch rider Lieuwe Westra of the Vacansoleil–DCM team, with Ramūnas Navardauskas of Garmin–Sharp second and Manuele Boaro of Saxo Bank–Tinkoff Bank third.

The 2012 race was moved to the end of August from its usual start date at the beginning of the month because of a clash with the 2012 Olympic Games. Organisers believe that this led to less spectators viewing the race than in the past and plan for the 2013 edition to start following the 2013 Tour de France.

== Schedule ==
Stage	Route	Distance	Date	Winner
1	Randers > Randers	191 km	22 August	André Greipel (GER)
2	Løgstør > Aarhus	211 km	23 August	André Greipel (GER)
3	Silkeborg > Vejle	185 km	24 August	Lars Petter Nordhaug (NOR)
4	Ringe > Odense	90 km	25 August	Alexander Kristoff (NOR)
5 (ITT)	Kerteminde > Kerteminde	14.5 km	25 August	Lieuwe Westra (NED)
6	Slagelse > Frederiksberg	165 km	26 August	Mark Cavendish (GBR)

== Teams ==
17 teams were invited to the 2012 Danmark Rundt: 8 teams from the UCI ProTeams, 4 UCI Professional Continental Teams, 4 UCI Continental Teams along with a Danish national team under the Team Post Danmark name.

UCI ProTeams
- (Denmark) Saxo Bank–Tinkoff Bank
- (Netherlands) Rabobank
- (Netherlands) Vacansoleil–DCM
- (United States) Garmin–Sharp
- (United Kingdom) Team Sky
- (Russia) Team Katusha
- (Belgium) Lotto–Belisol
- (Belgium) Omega Pharma–Quick-Step
UCI Professional Continental Teams
- (Russia) RusVelo
- (Italy) Colnago–CSF Bardiani
- (Belgium) Topsport Vlaanderen–Mercator
- (France) Team Europcar
UCI Continental Teams
- (Denmark) Glud & Marstrand–LRØ
- (Denmark) Forsikring–Himmerland
- (Denmark) Christina Watches–Onfone
- (Denmark) Blue Water Cycling
National Team
- (Denmark) Team Post Danmark

== Stages ==
=== Stage 1 ===
22 August 2012 – Randers to Randers, 191 km (119 mi)

The stage started and ended in Randers, taking in a tour of the Djursland peninsula and passing through the town of Grenaa. A crash involving around half of the field occurred 3½km before the finish before being won by German rider André Greipel of the Lotto–Belisol team. Alexander Kristoff of Team Katusha finished second, with Theo Bos of Rabobank finishing third.

Organisers decided to award every rider the same time following the mass crash as the riders involved were part of the peloton at the time. This is usually only done if riders are within the 3 km mark at the end of the stage, a decision which attracted some criticism from Michael Rasmussen.

=== Stage 2 ===
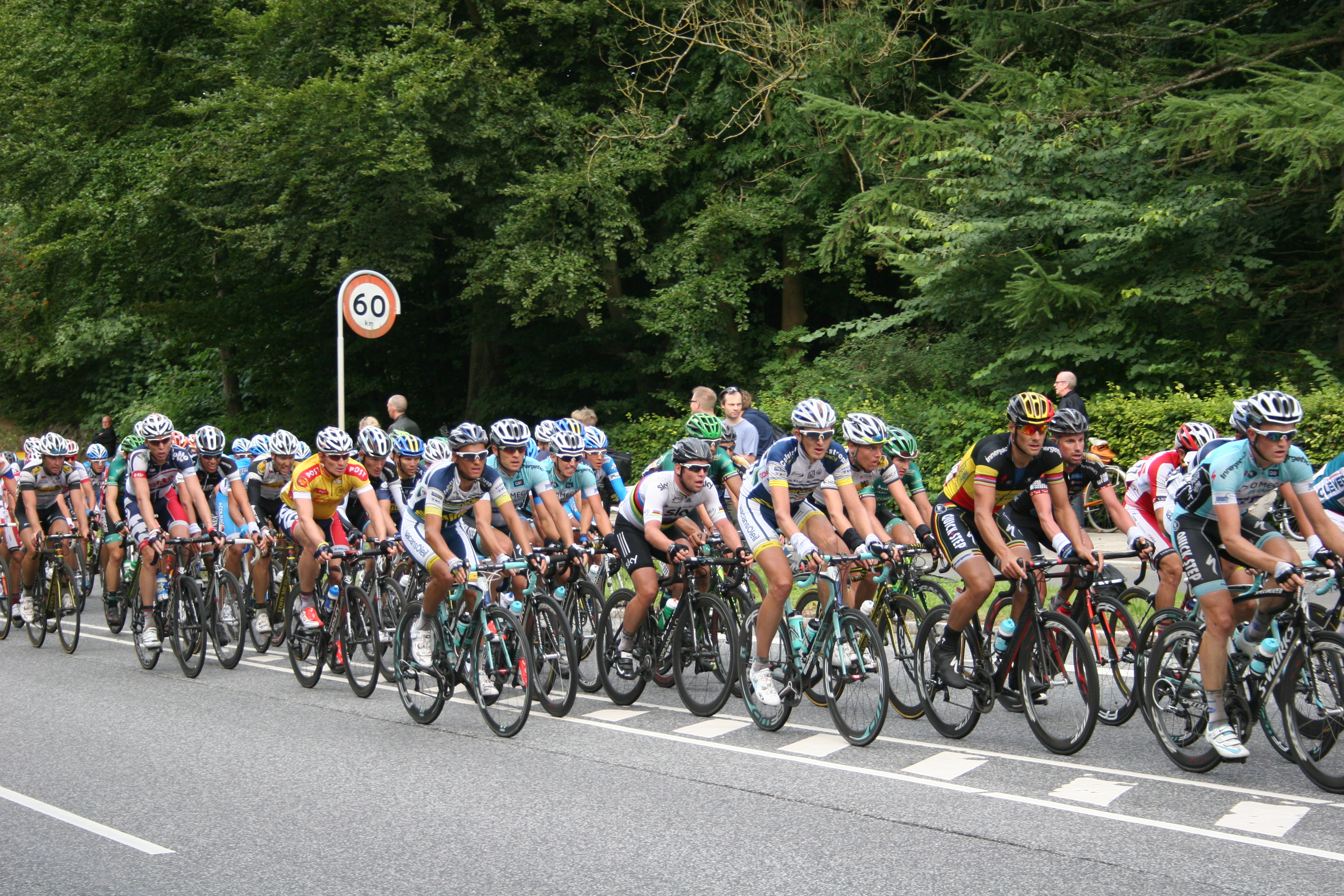
Canvendish, Boonen and Greipel at Oddervej in Aarhus d. 23. August 2012 stage 2

23 August 2012 – Løgstør to Aarhus, 211 km (131 mi)

Stage two was the longest stage of the 2012 race, starting in Løgstør on the Limfjord and travelling generally south through Jutland. It passed through the town of Viborg before ending in Aarhus. It was described as a key stage with a possibly critical impact on the overall standings. The stage was won by André Greipel following a bunch sprint at the finish. Topsport Vlaanderen–Mercator rider Michael Van Staeyen finished second with Steele Von Hoff of Garmin–Sharp third.

=== Stage 3 ===
24 August 2012 – Silkeborg to Vejle, 185 km (115 mi)

Stage three has been described as the toughest stage in the race and contained the most climbs. The route initially ran north from Silkeborg through Kjellerup, before turning southwards through Silkeborg again before heading towards Vejle. It finished after the traditional climb of Kiddesvej, a 350-metre climb with an average gradient of 12.5% and a maximum gradient of 21%. This climb has been included in the Danmark Rundt each year since 2004.

After a breakaway, which at one point reached eight minutes, most riders rejoined the peloton before the final climb of Kiddesvej led to a small group being able to complete the stage ahead of the main bunch. The stage winner was Lars Petter Nordhaug of Team Sky who took over the general classification lead from André Greipel. Wilco Kelderman of Rabobank came second with Ramūnas Navardauskas of Garmin–Sharp third.

=== Stage 4 ===
25 August 2012 – Ringe to Odense, 90 km (56 mi)

A short stage to allow for an individual time trial later in the same day, stage four saw the race move to Funen. Starting in Ringe, the route traveled south to Faaborg on the south coast, before passing north to Odense. Much of the route was wet and, again, produced a sprint finish which was won by Alexander Kristoff of Team Katusha ahead of Andrew Fenn of Omega Pharma–Quick-Step and Theo Bos of Rabobank. Lars Petter Nordhaug retained the yellow jersey with just a one-second lead over Kristoff ahead of the evening individual time trial around Kerteminde.

=== Stage 5 ===
25 August 2012 – Kerteminde to Kerteminde, 14.5 km (9.0 mi) individual time trial (ITT)

Stage five was a 14½km individual time trial around Kerteminde on Funen. The stage was identical to the time trial used in the 2002 and 2008 races. It was won by Lieuwe Westra of the Vacansoleil–DCM team who took the yellow jersey, leading the race by ten seconds from Ramūnas Navardauskas.

=== Stage 6 ===
26 August 2012 – Slagelse to Frederiksberg, 165 km (103 mi)

Stage six started in Slagelse on Sjælland and passed through Sorø and Roskilde before arriving in Frederiksberg. Ten laps of 6 km each led to the traditional race finish on Frederiksberg Allé. The stage was won by Team Sky rider Mark Cavendish in a bunch sprint, with Lieuwe Westra retaining the overall lead.

== Classification leadership ==
Stage	Winner	General classification	Points classification	Mountains classification	Young rider classification	Team classification	Most Aggressive classification
1	André Greipel	André Greipel	André Greipel	Morten Høberg	Luke Rowe	Topsport Vlaanderen–Mercator	Jesper Mørkøv
2	André Greipel	André Greipel	André Greipel	Morten Høberg	Luke Rowe	Topsport Vlaanderen–Mercator	Jarosław Marycz
3	Lars Petter Nordhaug	Lars Petter Nordhaug	André Greipel	Nikola Aistrup	Wilco Kelderman	Team Europcar	Sven Vandousselaere
4	Alexander Kristoff	Lars Petter Nordhaug	Alexander Kristoff	Nikola Aistrup	Wilco Kelderman	Team Europcar	Christian Jersild Jensen
5	Lieuwe Westra	Lieuwe Westra	Alexander Kristoff	Nikola Aistrup	Wilco Kelderman	Team Sky	–
6	Mark Cavendish	Lieuwe Westra	Alexander Kristoff	Nikola Aistrup	Wilco Kelderman	Team Sky	Sebastian Lander
Final		Lieuwe Westra	Alexander Kristoff	Nikola Aistrup	Wilco Kelderman	Team Sky	Sebastian Lander

== Final standings ==
The general classification was won by Lieuwe Westra of Vacansoleil–DCM by ten seconds from Ramūnas Navardauskas of Garmin–Sharp with Manuele Boaro of Saxo Bank–Tinkoff Bank another four seconds back in third place. Team Katusha rider Alexander Kristoff won the points trophy by one point from Lotto–Belisol rider André Greipel.

The mountain classification was won by Danish rider Nikola Aistrup of Team Concordia Forsikring–Himmerland with Dutch rider Wilco Kelderman of Team Rabobank winning the young riders award. Glud & Marstrand–LRØ rider Sebastian Lander won the fighters award. The team race was won by Team Sky.
