= Rostollan =

Rostollan is a surname. Notable people with the surname include:

- Louis Rostollan (1936–2020), French road bicycle racer
- Thomas Rostollan (born 1986), French road bicycle racer
