= Østergaard =

Østergaard (Danish pronunciation: [ˈøstɐkɒː]) is a Danish surname, literally meaning east farm. The double a "aa" is equivalent of å in common nouns and is retained from the pre-1948 orthography in proper nouns only. Notable people with this surname include:

== Østergaard ==
- Flemming Østergaard (born 1943), Danish businessman
- Morten Østergaard (born 1976), Danish politician
- Niki Østergaard (born 1988), Danish road racing cyclist
- Søren Østergaard (born 1957), Danish film, television and stage actor
- Ulrich Østergaard (born 1981), Danish speedway rider

== Ostergaard ==
- Geoffrey Ostergaard (1926–1990), political scientist and anarcho-pacifist
- Henrik Ostergaard (1968–2011), Danish-born guitarist/vocalist and founder of rock band Dirty Looks
