= Nikola Aistrup =

Danish cyclist (born 1987)

Personal information
- Born: 22 August 1987 (age 39) Ballerup, Denmark

Cycling career
- Sport: Cycling
- Current team: Retired
- Discipline: Road
- Role: Rider

Professional teams
- 2006: Team Konica Minolta
- 2007–2009: Team GLS
- 2010–2015: Concordia Forsikring–Himmerland

Nikola Aistrup (born 22 August 1987 in Ballerup) is a Danish former professional racing cyclist.

== Major results ==
2008
3rd Road race, National Under-23 Road Championships
2009
2nd Paris–Roubaix Espoirs
3rd Fyen Rundt
6th Road race, UEC European Under-23 Road Championships
2010
2nd Rogaland GP
5th Grand Prix de la ville de Pérenchies
2011
3rd Grand Prix de la Ville de Lillers
10th Rogaland GP
2012
1st Mountains classification Danmark Rundt
2nd Himmerland Rundt
2013
6th Ronde van Overijssel
8th Himmerland Rundt
2014
1st Mountains classification Dookoła Mazowsza
