= René Jørgensen =

Danish cyclist

Personal information
- Full name: René Jørgensen
- Born: 26 July 1975 (age 51) Herning, Denmark

Cycling career
- Sport: Cycling
- Discipline: Road
- Role: Rider

Professional teams
- 1998–2001: home–Jack & Jones
- 2002–2003: Team Fakta
- 2004: Alessio–Bianchi
- 2005: Barloworld
- 2006–2010: Team Designa Køkken
- 2011–2012: Christina Watches–Onfone

René Jørgensen (born 26 July 1975) is a former road bicycle racer from Denmark.

== Career ==
He rode for the Danish professional cycling team, home–Jack & Jones, which he joined in 1998. He left the team, which by that time had changed the name twice; 2000 season to Memory Card – Jack & Jones and from 2001 to CSC – Tiscali after the 2001 season, where he decided to join another Danish team: EDS-Fakta. The team changed its name to Team Fakta, and he rode for the team until it closed in 2003. He went to the Italian team Alessio–Bianchi, which, however, also closed, at the end of the 2004 season. In 2005, he signed with the South African team, Barloworld, which he represented for a single season, before he returned to Denmark to ride for the UCI Continental team, Team Designa Køkken, with whom he remained with until the end of 2010.

== Major results ==
1993
2nd Overall Grand Prix Rüebliland
1997
2nd Road race, National Under-23 Road Championships
2000
9th Overall Tour Down Under
2001
10th Overall Tour de Langkawi
2002
4th Overall Tour de Langkawi
4th Grand Prix de Wallonie
6th GP Aarhus
2003
2nd Sparkassen Giro Bochum
7th Paris–Camembert
2004
8th Overall Tour de Luxembourg
2005
3rd GP Aarhus
10th Ronde van Drenthe
2006
3rd Grand Prix Cristal Energie
3rd Grand Prix Demy-Cars
10th Boucle de l'Artois
2007
2nd Boucle de l'Artois
2nd Ronde van Drenthe
2nd GP Herning
5th Grand Prix Cristal Energie
6th Grote Prijs Jef Scherens
6th Overall Rhône-Alpes Isère Tour
2008
4th Road race, National Road Championships
6th Overall Paris–Corrèze
2009
1st GP Herning
6th Grand Prix des Marbriers
2010
2nd Overall Ronde de l'Oise
2011
6th GP Herning
2012
3rd Ronde van Drenthe
