= 2015 Tro-Bro Léon =

2015 UCI Europe Tour

Race details
- Dates: 19 April 2015
- Distance: 204.4 km (127.0 mi)
- Winning time: 5h 07' 10"

Results
	Winner	Alexandre Geniez (FRA)	(FDJ)
	Second	Benoît Jarrier (FRA)	(Bretagne–Séché Environnement)
	Third	Florian Sénéchal (FRA)	(Cofidis)

The 2015 Tro-Bro Léon was the 32nd edition of the Tro-Bro Léon cycle race and was held on 19 April 2015. The race was won by Alexandre Geniez.

== Results ==
Rank	Rider	Team	Time
1	Alexandre Geniez (FRA)	FDJ	5h 07' 10"
2	Benoît Jarrier (FRA)	Bretagne–Séché Environnement	+ 0"
3	Florian Sénéchal (FRA)	Cofidis	+ 0"
4	Jimmy Engoulvent (FRA)	Team Europcar	+ 0"
5	Pierre-Luc Périchon (FRA)	Bretagne–Séché Environnement	+ 4"
6	Florian Vachon (FRA)	Bretagne–Séché Environnement	+ 1' 32"
7	Fabien Canal (FRA)	Armée de Terre	+ 1' 44"
8	Francis Mourey (FRA)	FDJ	+ 1' 44"
9	Kévin Ledanois (FRA)	Bretagne–Séché Environnement	+ 1' 44"
10	Berden de Vries (NED)	Team Roompot	+ 1' 44"
