= Médéric Clain =

French cyclist

Personal information
- Born: 29 October 1976 (age 49) Meulan-en-Yvelines, France

Cycling career
- Sport: Cycling
- Current team: UV Poitiers
- Discipline: Road
- Role: Rider

Amateur teams
- 1998: VC St. Quentin
- 1999: CM Aubervilliers
- 2005: Team Odass Diemme
- 2006: V.C. Roubaix
- 2007-2011: St Cyr-Tours
- 2012: Cercle Gambetta Orléans Loiret
- 2013-: UV Poitiers

Professional teams
- 2000: Besson Chaussures
- 2001-2004: Cofidis

Médéric Clain (born 29 October 1976 in Meulan-en-Yvelines) is a French cyclist riding for UV Poitiers.

== Major results ==
1999
1st Tour de Corrèze
2000
2nd GP Ostfenster
2003
2nd Tallinn-Tartu GP
2005
1st stage 1 Critérium des Espoirs
2nd Circuit de Saône-et-Loire
2nd Circuit Boussaquin
2nd Grand Prix de la Ville de Nogent-sur-Oise
2006
3rd Grand Prix de la Ville de Lillers
3rd Boucle de l'Artois
3rd Tour de Moselle
2007
1st Grand Prix de Tours
1st stage 1 Tour de Dordogne
3rd Grand Prix Cristal Energie
2008
1st stage 2 Tour du Canton de Saint-Ciers
2009
1st stage 4 Tour de Nouvelle-Calédonie
2nd La Roue Tourangelle
2nd Ronde de l'Oise
2010
1st Grand Prix de Tours
2nd Tour de Madagascar

1st Stages 4 & 10

2011
1st stages 1b & 5 Boucle du Coton
3rd Tour de Madagascar
1st Prologue (TTT) & Stage 1
