= Samuel Plouhinec =

French cyclist

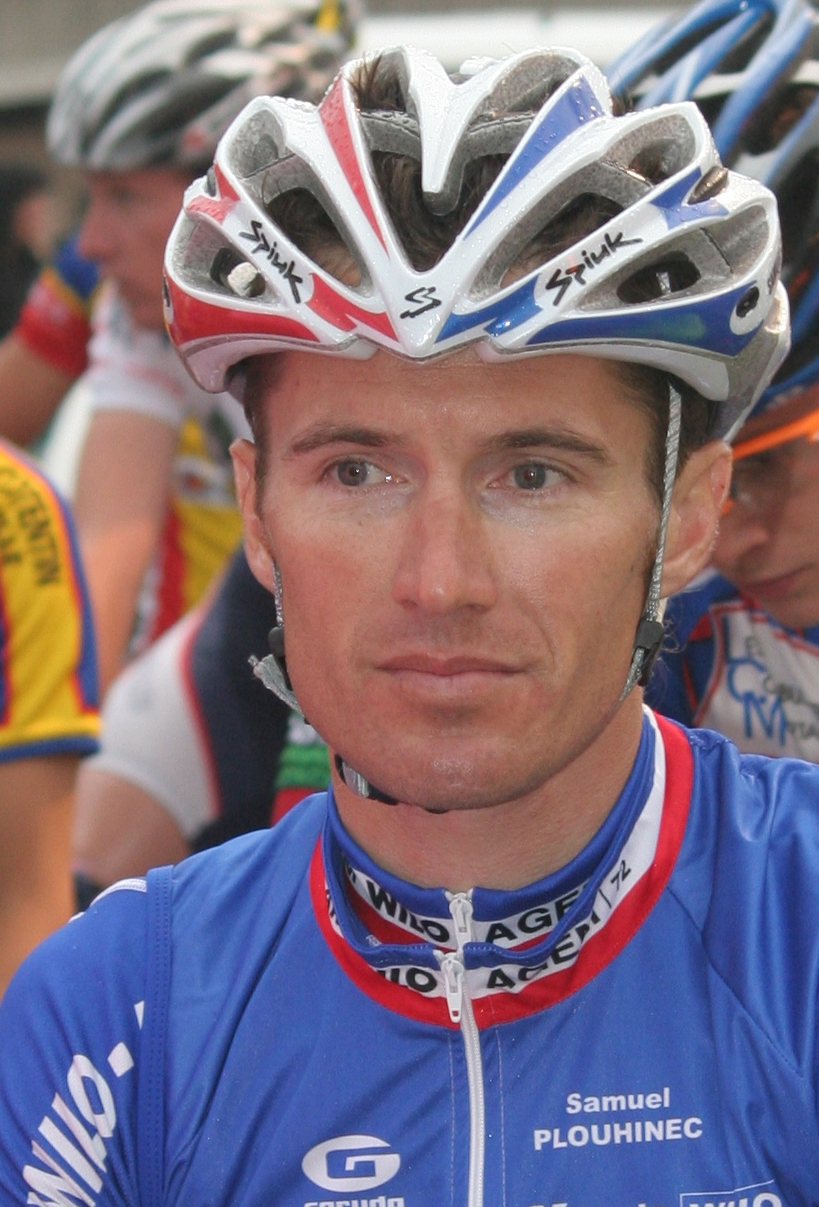

Personal information
- Full name: Samuel Plouhinec
- Born: March 5, 1976 (age 50) Le Mans, France
- Height: 1.75 m (5 ft 9 in)
- Weight: 61 kg (134 lb)

Cycling career
- Sport: Cycling
- Current team: Retired
- Discipline: Road
- Role: Rider

Amateur teams
- 1996–1997: Vendée U
- 2002–2003: AVC Aix-en-Provence
- 2004: Jean Floc'h–Moréac
- 2008–2009: Perche–Agem 72
- 2010–2011: Véranda Rideau Sarthe
- 2012–2017: Peltrax–CS Dammarie-lès-Lys

Professional teams
- 1997–1999: Cofidis
- 2001: Jean Delatour
- 2005: Bretagne–Jean Floc'h
- 2006–2007: Agritubel

Samuel Plouhinec (born 5 March 1976) is a French former road bicycle racer. He won stage 4 of the 2005 Tour de l'Ain.

== Major results ==
1996
1st Road race, National Under-23 Road Championships
2nd Paris–Tours Espoirs
2000
1st Stage 2 Ronde de l'Oise
2nd Paris–Troyes
10th Overall Tour de l'Ain

1st Stage 2

2002
1st Grand Prix Cristal Energie
10th Classic Loire Atlantique
2003
1st Grand Prix Cristal Energie
1st Mountains classification, Tour du Limousin
2005
2nd GP de Villers-Cotterêts
3rd Overall Tour de l'Ain

1st Stage 4

6th Polynormande
9th Overall Tour du Limousin
2006
9th Overall Route du Sud
2007
7th Grand Prix Cristal Energie
8th Polymultipliée Lyonnaise
2008
1st Trio Normand (with Nicolas Edet & Benoît Jarrier)
2nd Grand Prix des Marbriers
4th Grand Prix Cristal Energie
2009
1st Road race, National Amateur Road Championships
1st Stage 3 Boucles de la Mayenne
4th Overall Les 3 Jours de Vaucluse
2011
2nd Overall Boucle de l'Artois
10th Overall Boucles de la Mayenne
2014
1st Stage 3 Tour du Jura
2015
UCI Masters Road World Championships (35-39)

1st Road race
3rd Time trial

2017
UCI Masters Road World Championships (40-44)

1st Road race
1st Time trial

2nd Overall Boucle de l'Artois

=== Tour de France Participations ===
- 2006 - DNF
