= Jérôme Mainard =

French cyclist

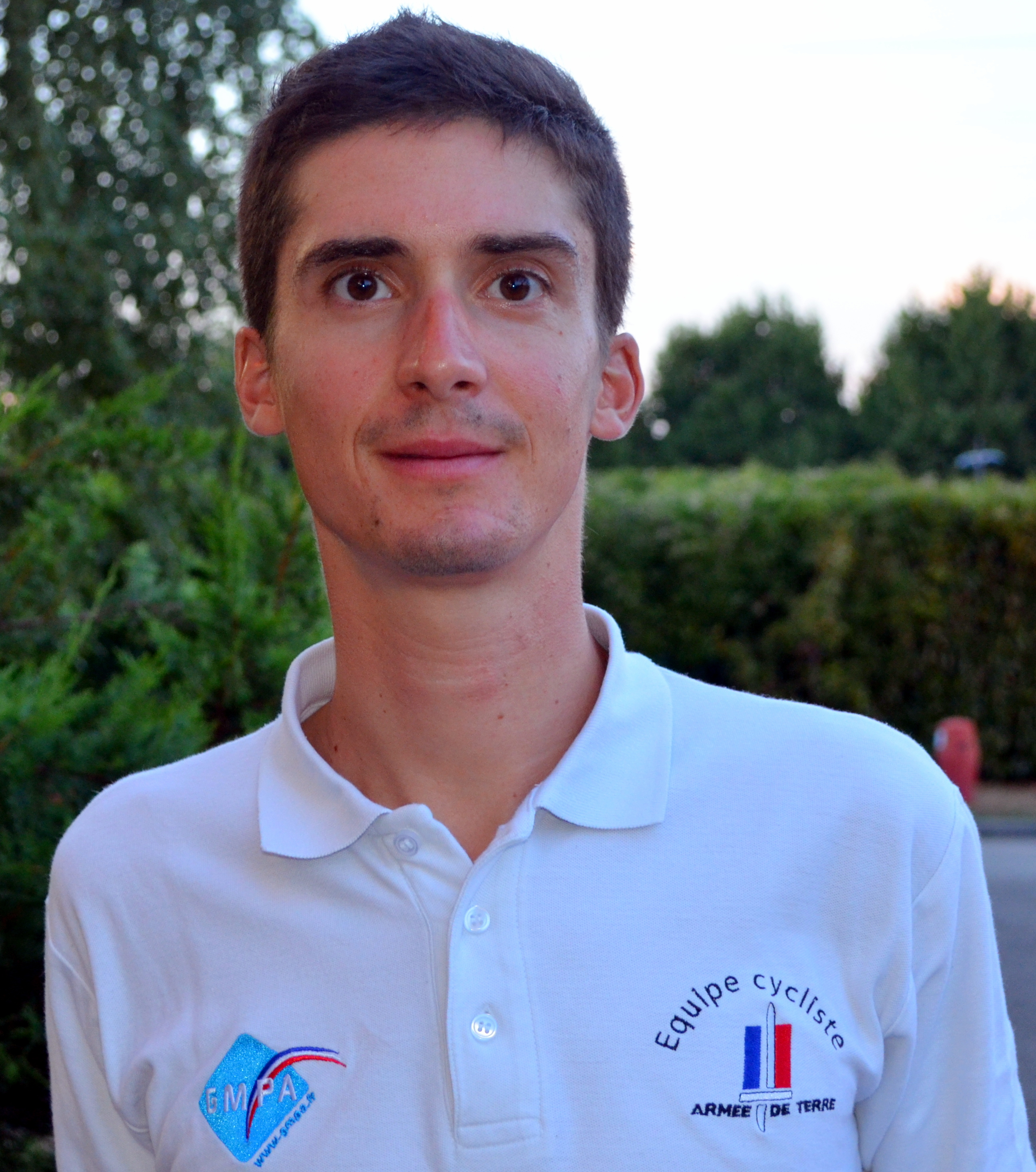
- Mainard in 2015

Personal information
- Born: 25 August 1986 (age 40) Roanne, France

Cycling career
- Sport: Cycling
- Discipline: Road
- Role: Rider

Amateur teams
- 2008–2014: CR4C Roanne
- 2019–2020: CR4C Roanne

Professional teams
- 2015–2017: Armée de Terre
- 2018: Roubaix–Lille Métropole

Jérôme Mainard (born 25 August 1986) is a former French amateur cyclist, who last rode for French amateur team CR4C Roanne.

== Major results ==
2008
7th Paris–Tours Espoirs
2013
7th Tour de Berne
2014
9th Tour de Berne
2015
5th Overall Rhône-Alpes Isère Tour
8th Tour du Doubs
10th Grand Prix de la ville de Nogent-sur-Oise
2016
6th Overall GP Liberty Seguros
2017
1st Mountains classification Circuit des Ardennes
3rd Overall Rhône-Alpes Isère Tour
4th Binche–Chimay–Binche
7th Grand Prix des Marbriers
2018
5th Grand Prix de la ville de Nogent-sur-Oise
