= Jérémy Lecroq =

French cyclist (born 1995)

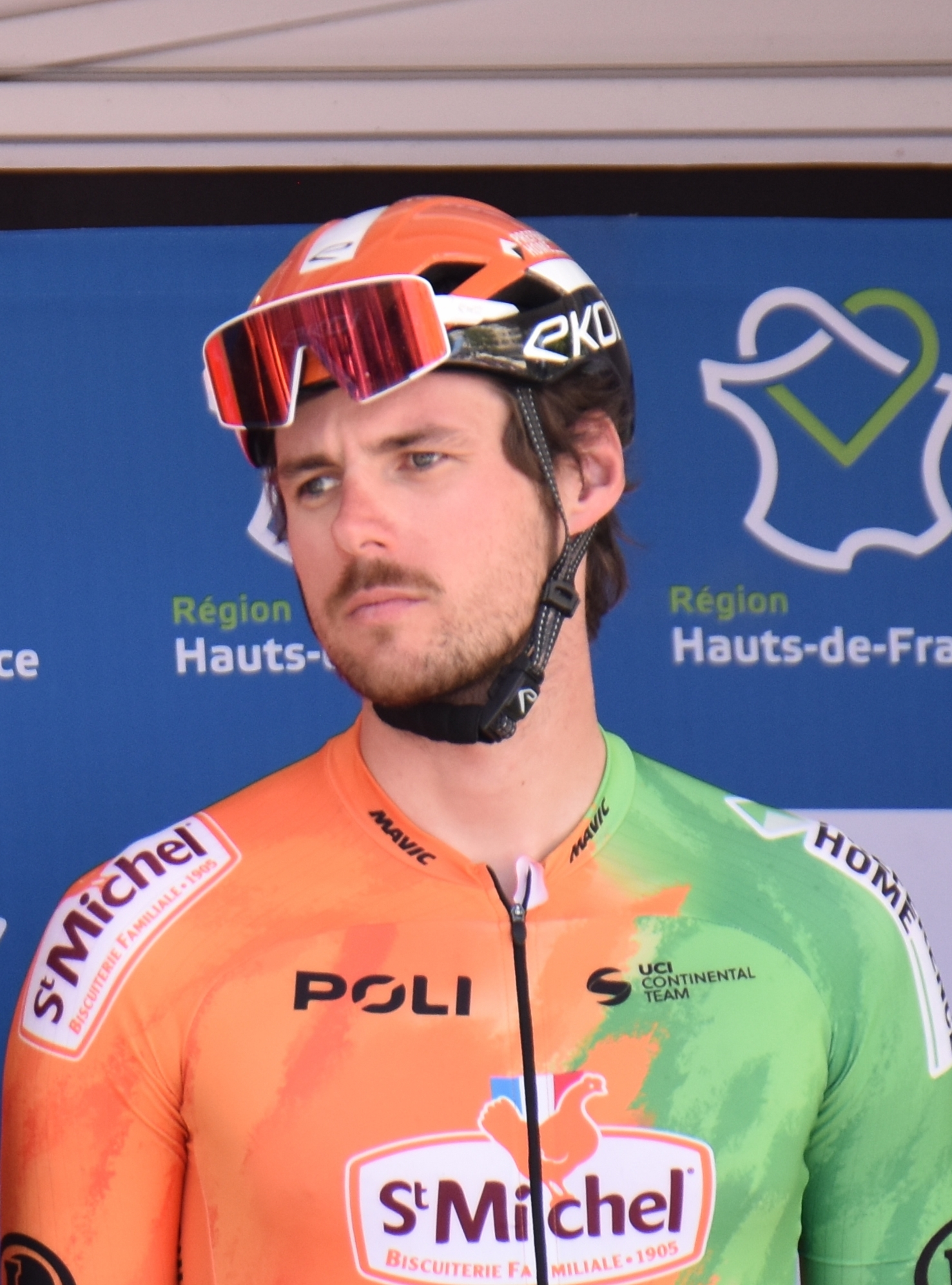
- Lecroq in 2025

Personal information
- Full name: Jérémy Lecroq
- Born: 7 April 1995 (age 31) Paris, France
- Height: 1.86 m (6 ft 1 in)
- Weight: 76 kg (168 lb)

Cycling career
- Sport: Cycling
- Current team: St. Michel–Preference Home–Auber93
- Discipline: Road
- Role: Rider
- Rider type: Sprinter

Amateur teams
- 2012–2013: Argenteuil Val de Seine 95 Junior
- 2014–2016: CC Nogent-sur-Oise
- 2016: Klein Constantia (stagiaire)
- 2023: Philippe Wagner Cycling

Professional teams
- 2017: Roubaix–Lille Métropole
- 2018–2022: Vital Concept
- 2024–: St. Michel–Mavic–Auber93

Jérémy Lecroq (born 7 April 1995) is a French cyclist, who currently rides for UCI Continental team St. Michel–Preference Home–Auber93.

== Major results ==
2013
5th Bernaudeau Junior
9th Chrono des Nations Juniors
2015
5th Overall ZLM Tour
2016
8th Grand Prix de la Ville de Lillers
2017
3rd ZLM Tour
3rd Ronde van Vlaanderen Beloften
3rd Paris–Bourges
6th Grand Prix de Denain
10th Omloop Eurometropool
2018
1st Grand Prix de la Ville de Lillers
5th Scheldeprijs
2020
4th Paris–Chauny
2021
6th Grand Prix d'Isbergues
9th Ronde van Limburg
9th Brussels Cycling Classic
2023
2nd Le Tour des 100 Communes
2024
7th Paris–Chauny

=== Grand Tour general classification results timeline ===
Grand Tour	2022
Giro d'Italia	—
Tour de France	125
Vuelta a España	—

Legend
—	Did not compete
DNF	Did not finish
