= 2018 Grand Prix de la Ville de Lillers =

- 2018 UCI Europe Tour

Race details
- Dates: 4 March 2018
- Stages: 1
- Distance: 187 km (116.2 mi)
- Winning time: 4h 19' 51"

Results
	Winner	Jérémy Lecroq (FRA)	(Vital Concept)
	Second	Yoann Paillot (FRA)	(St. Michel–Auber93)
	Third	Alfdan De Decker (BEL)	(Lotto–Soudal U23)

The 2018 Grand Prix de la Ville de Lillers was the 54th edition of Grand Prix de la Ville de Lillers road cycling one day race. It was part of UCI Europe Tour in category 1.2.

== Teams ==
Nineteen teams were invited to take part in the race. These included two UCI Professional Continental teams and seventeen UCI Continental teams.

UCI Professional Continental teams

- Wanty–Groupe Gobert
- Vital Concept

UCI Continental teams

- Roubaix–Lille Métropole
- St. Michel–Auber93
- Leopard Pro Cycling
- Heizomat–rad-net.de
- T.Palm–Pôle Continental Wallon
- Dauner D&DQ–Akkon
- Team Sauerland NRW p/b SKS Germany
- Differdange–Losch
- Team Vorarlberg Santic
- Canyon Eisberg
- Vitus Pro Cycling Team
- Sovac–Natura4Ever
- Lotto–Soudal U23
- VC Rouen 76
- Dunkerque Littoral Cyclisme
- CC Nogent-sur-Oise
- CC Villeneuve Saint-Germain

== General classification ==
Result
Rank	Rider	Team	Time
1	Jérémy Lecroq (FRA)	Vital Concept	4h 19' 51"
2	Yoann Paillot (FRA)	St. Michel–Auber93	+ 1"
3	Alfdan De Decker (BEL)	Lotto–Soudal U23	+ 15"
4	Pierre Idjouadiene (FRA)	Roubaix–Lille Métropole	+ 15"
5	Jérôme Baugnies (BEL)	Wanty–Groupe Gobert	+ 41"
6	Julian Mertens (BEL)	Lotto–Soudal U23	+ 41"
7	Andrea Pasqualon (ITA)	Wanty–Groupe Gobert	+ 48"
8	Kevin Van Melsen (BEL)	Wanty–Groupe Gobert	+ 49"
9	Daragh O'Mahony (IRE)	CC Nogent-sur-Oise	+ 58"
10	Mario Spengler (SUI)	Leopard Pro Cycling	+ 58"
