= Fabien Canal =

French cyclist

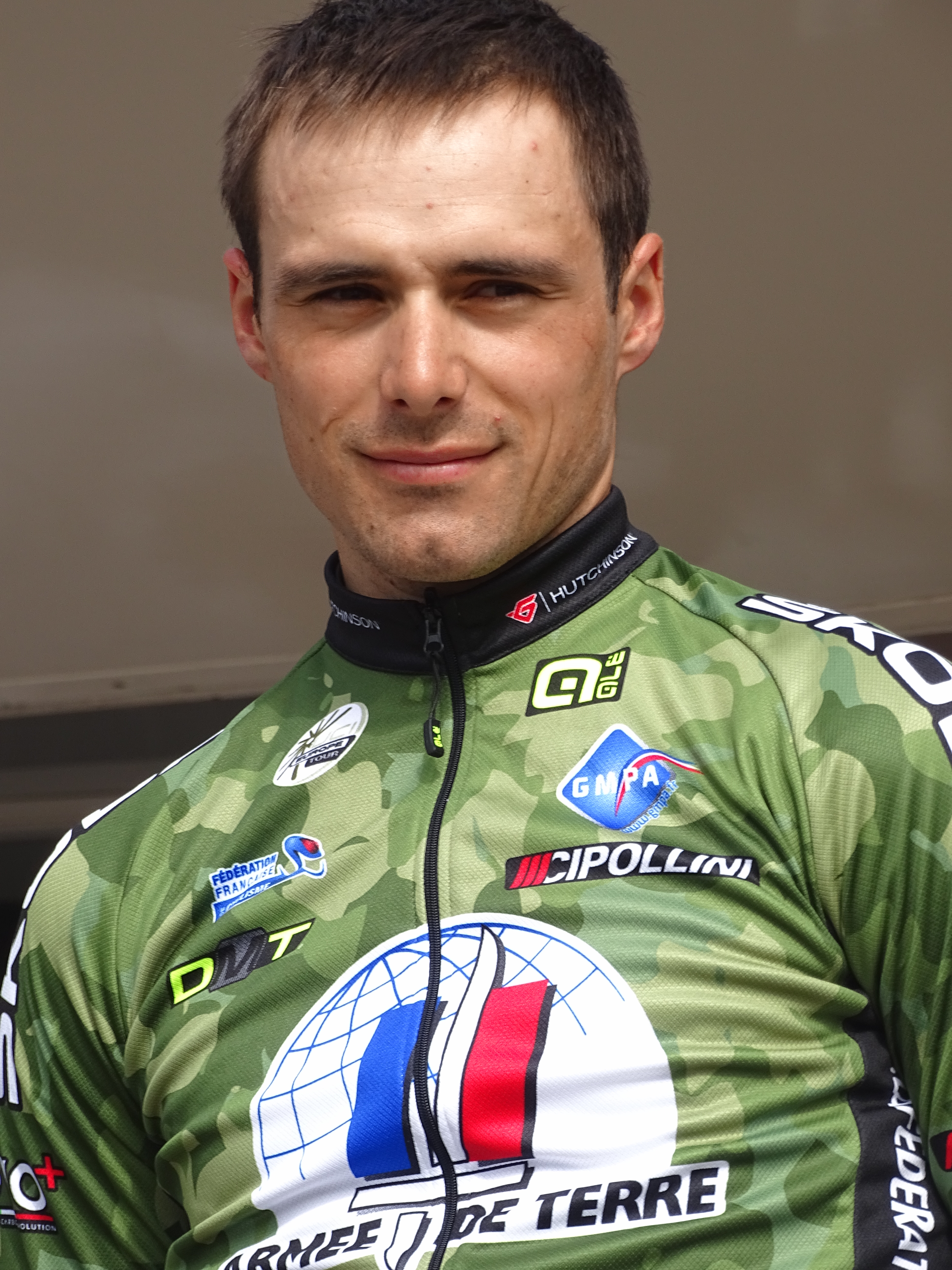
- Canal in 2015

Personal information
- Born: 4 April 1989 (age 37) Belfort, France

Cycling career
- Sport: Cycling
- Current team: Retired
- Disciplines: Road; Mountain biking; Cyclo-cross
- Role: Rider

Amateur teams
- 2013: US Giromagny VTT
- 2014: Armée de Terre

Professional teams
- 2008–2009: Lapierre International (MTN)
- 2010: Keops–Itwo (MTN)
- 2011–2012: GT Škoda Chamonix (MTN)
- 2014: Look Beaumes de Venise (MTN)
- 2015–2017: Armée de Terre

Fabien Canal (born 4 April 1989) is a French former cyclist, who competed in the cyclo-cross, mountain biking, and road cycling disciplines.

== Major results ==
=== Mountain biking ===
2007
1st Cross-country, National Junior Mountain Bike Championships
2011
1st Team relay, UCI Mountain Bike & Trials World Championships (with Maxime Marotte, Victor Koretzky and Julie Bresset)
1st Mixed relay, UEC European Mountain Bike Championships (with Maxime Marotte, Victor Koretzky and Julie Bresset)
1st Cross-country, National Under-23 Mountain Bike Championships
2014
1st Cross-country, National Military Mountain Bike Championships

=== Cyclo-cross ===
2013–2014
1st Cyclo-cross Épenoy
1st Cyclo-cross Saint-Nabord
1st Cyclo-cross Saint-Bernard
1st Cyclo-cross Hauteville-lès-Dijon
1st Cyclo-cross Golbey
1st Cyclo-cross Rioz
1st Cyclo-cross Écuelles
2nd National Cyclo-cross Championships
2014–2015
1st Cyclo-cross International de la Solidarité, Lutterbach
1st Cyclo-cross Les Fins
1st Cyclo-cross Damelevières

=== Road ===
2014
10th Overall Tour des Pays de Savoie
2015
5th Overall Tour de Picardie
7th Tro-Bro Léon
8th Paris–Chauny
2017
1st Paris–Mantes-en-Yvelines
