= Catavana–AS Corbeil–Essonnes–Cedico =

1994 French professional road cycling team

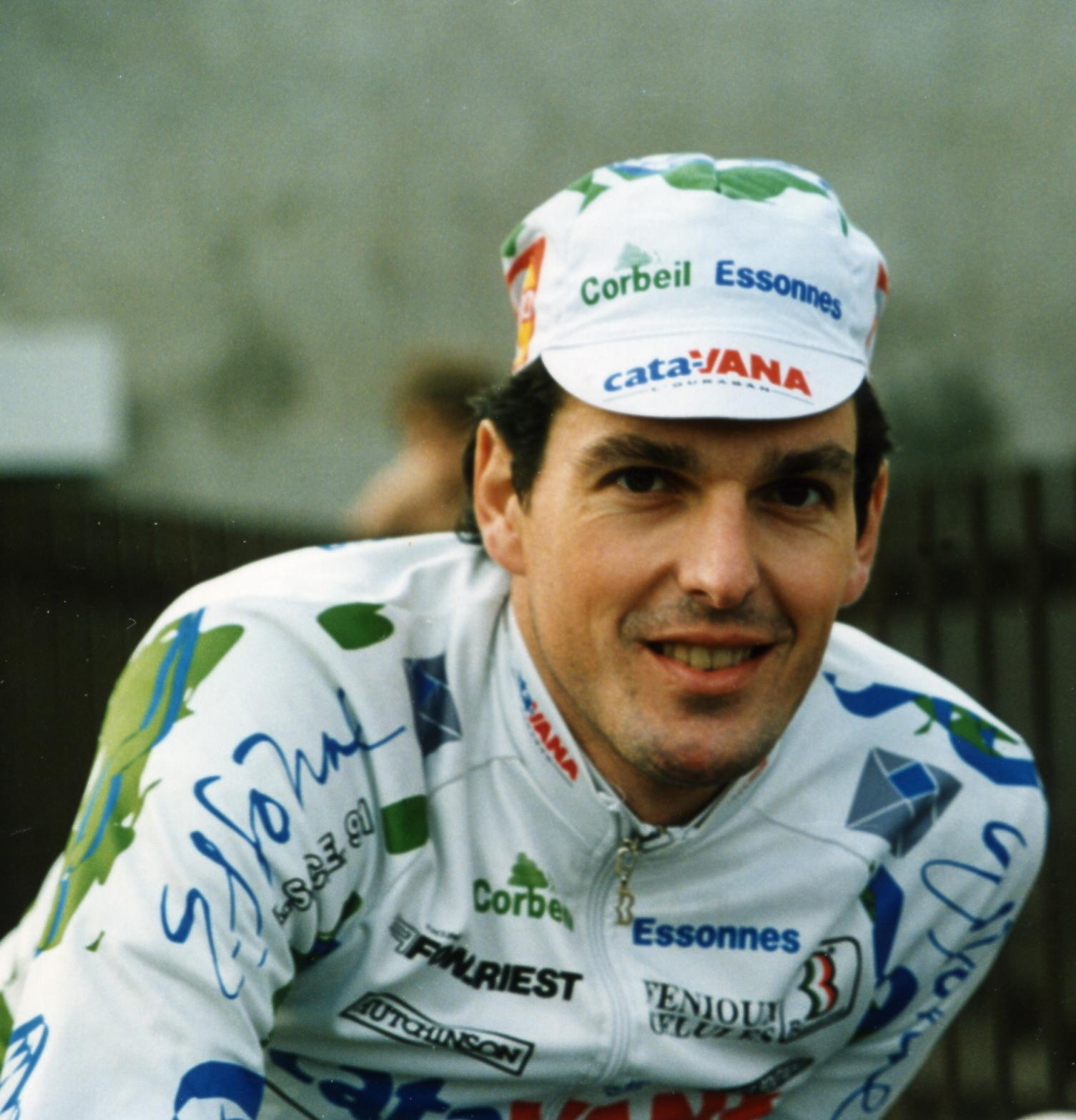
- Franck Boucanville wearing the team's jersey

Team information
- Registered: France
- Founded: 1994
- Disbanded: 1994
- Discipline: Road
- Bicycles: Fondriest

Key personnel
- General manager: Didier Paindavaine
- Team managers: Alain Gallopin; Guy Gallopin; Antoine Vayer

Team name history
- 1994: Catavana–AS Corbeil–Essonnes–Cedico

Catavana–AS Corbeil–Essonnes–Cedico was a French professional road cycling team that existed only for the 1994 season. Sean Kelly notably rode for the team for his final professional season. Marc Madiot the main directeur sportif of UCI WorldTeam Groupama–FDJ United also ended his career at Catavana.

The team was established by successful amateur team AS Corbeil–Essonnes, who wanted to create a new professional team. Catavana, a garden tool company, was the main sponsor of the team. Another major sponsor was supermarket chain Cédico.

== Team roster ==
Rider	Date of birth
Miguel Arroyo (Note: Arroyo joined the team on 1 May and left on 30 June.) (MEX)	6 December 1966 (aged 27)
Akira Asada (JPN)	28 November 1967 (aged 26)
Franck Boucanville (FRA)	1 January 1966 (aged 28)
Christian Chaubet (FRA)	19 July 1961 (aged 32)
Jérôme Chiotti (FRA)	18 January 1972 (aged 21)
Michel Dubreuil (FRA)	7 April 1966 (aged 27)
Patrice Esnault (FRA)	12 June 1961 (aged 32)
Benoît Farama (Note: Farama joined the team on 1 September as a stagiaire.) (FRA)	28 June 1970 (aged 23)
Pierrick Gillereau (FRA)	25 October 1968 (aged 25)

Rider	Date of birth
Franck Jarno (FRA)	7 July 1970 (aged 23)
Sean Kelly (IRE)	24 May 1956 (aged 37)
Gérard Liévin (Note: Liévin joined the team on 1 September as a stagiaire.) (FRA)	21 November 1970 (aged 23)
Marc Madiot (FRA)	16 April 1959 (aged 34)
Yvon Madiot (FRA)	21 June 1962 (aged 31)
Jean-Luc Masdupuy (FRA)	14 May 1969 (aged 24)
Erwann Menthéour (Note: Menthéour joined the team on 1 September as a stagiaire.) (FRA)	29 June 1973 (aged 20)
Lars Michaelsen (DEN)	13 March 1969 (aged 24)
Jean-Michel Monin (FRA)	7 September 1967 (aged 26)

== Major wins ==
1994
Overall International Cycling Classic, Lars Michaelsen
Paris–Bourges, Lars Michaelsen
Tour de l'Oise

Stage 3, Lars Michaelsen
Stage 4b, Franck Boucanville

Stage 3b Tour de l'Ain, Franck Jarno
