= Yann Guyot =

French bicycle racer

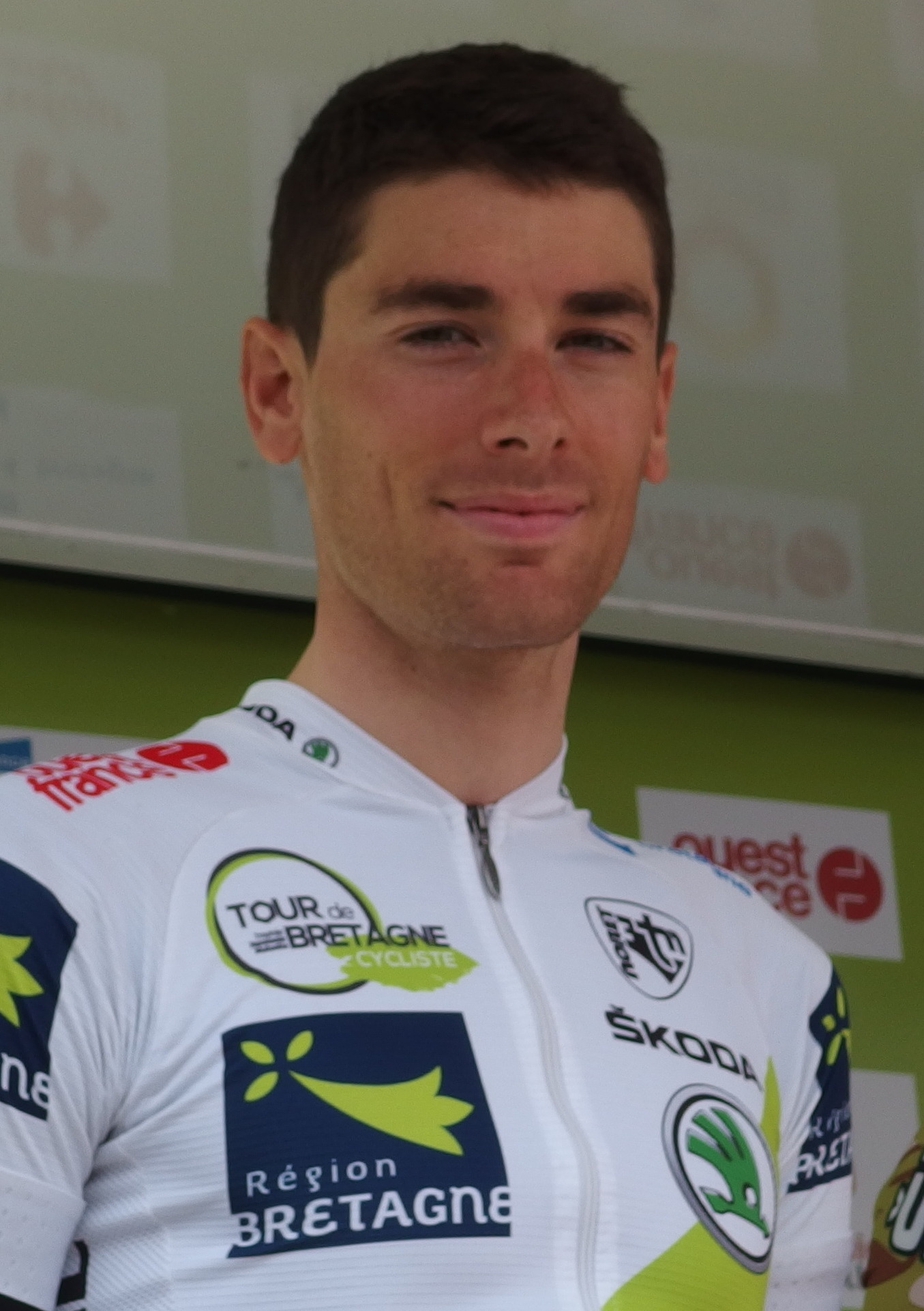
- Guyot in 2014

Personal information
- Full name: Yann Guyot
- Born: 26 February 1986 (age 40) Vannes, France

Cycling career
- Sport: Cycling
- Discipline: Road
- Role: Rider

Amateur teams
- 2005–2006: Véloce Vannetais
- 2007–2009: Côtes d'Armor
- 2009–2010: Super Sport 35–ACNC
- 2011–2014: Armée de Terre
- 2018: VC Rouen 76
- 2019: Laval Cyclisme 53
- 2020–2021: Véloce Vannetais

Professional team
- 2015–2017: Armée de Terre

Yann Guyot (born 26 February 1986) is a French cyclist, who most recently rode for French amateur team Véloce Vannetais.

== Major results ==
2008
1st Grand Prix de Plouay amateurs
2010
1st Road race, Brittany Regional Road Championships
1st Circuit du Morbihan
1st La Roue Tourangelle
2011
1st Grand Prix de Plouay amateurs
1st Stage 3 Boucles de la Marne
2013
1st Bordeaux–Saintes
1st Trophée Loire-Atlantique
2nd Paris–Chauny
4th Grand Prix des Marbriers
2014
1st Road race, National Amateur Road Championships
1st Overall Tour Nivernais Morvan

1st Stage 4

1st Grand Prix de Corbère
1st Ronde du Canigou
1st La Melrandaise
1st Tour du Pays du Roumois
1st Boucles de l'Austreberthe
1st Boucles Sérentaises
1st Grand Prix Cristal Energie
1st Grand Prix de la Saint-Laurent Elite-Prix des Stars
1st Grand Prix des Marbriers
1st Grand Prix de la ville de Fougères
1st Paris–Connerré
1st Stage 4 Tour de Moselle
2nd Grand Prix de la ville de Buxerolles
2nd Tour du Canton de Saint-Ciers
2nd Grand Prix de Boussière-sur-Sambre
3rd Overall Trois jours de Cherbourg
4th Polynormande
5th Overall Tour du Loir-et-Cher
9th Overall Tour de Bretagne

1st Stage 1

2015
1st Stage 3 Tour du Loir-et-Cher
3rd Manche–Océan
7th La Drôme Classic
10th Boucles de l'Aulne
2017
3rd Overall Paris–Arras Tour
