= Christian Chaubet =

French cyclist

Personal information
- Born: 19 July 1961 (age 65) Toulouse, France

Cycling career
- Sport: Cycling
- Current team: Retired
- Discipline: Road
- Role: Rider

Amateur team
- 1983–1985: VSLL Castres

Professional teams
- 1986–1987: Fagor
- 1988: Kas–Canal 10
- 1989: Fagor–MBK
- 1990–1991: Toshiba
- 1992–1993: Chazal–Vanille et Mûre
- 1994: Catavana–AS Corbeil–Essonnes–Cedico

Christian Chaubet (born 19 July 1961) is a French former racing cyclist. He rode in three editions of the Tour de France and one edition of the Giro d'Italia.

== Major results ==
1985
1st Paris–Roubaix Espoirs
1986
1st Stage 12b Tour de la Communauté Européenne
4th Overall Tour du Limousin
1987
1st Stage 1 Volta a Portugal
1988
1st Stage 2a Tour du Limousin
1989
2nd Overall Tour du Limousin
6th Overall Etoile de Bessèges
1990
1st Stage 1 Tour du Limousin
10th A Travers le Morbihan
1991
8th Paris–Brussels
1992
6th A Travers le Morbihan
1993
9th Overall Etoile de Bessèges
1994
3rd Overall Etoile de Bessèges
8th Grand Prix d'Ouverture La Marseillaise

=== Grand Tour general classification results timeline ===
Grand Tour	1986	1987	1988	1989	1990	1991
Vuelta a España	—	—	—	—	—	—
Giro d'Italia	DNF	123	—	DNF	—	—
Tour de France	—	—	—	79	149	110
