= Franck Boucanville =

French cyclist

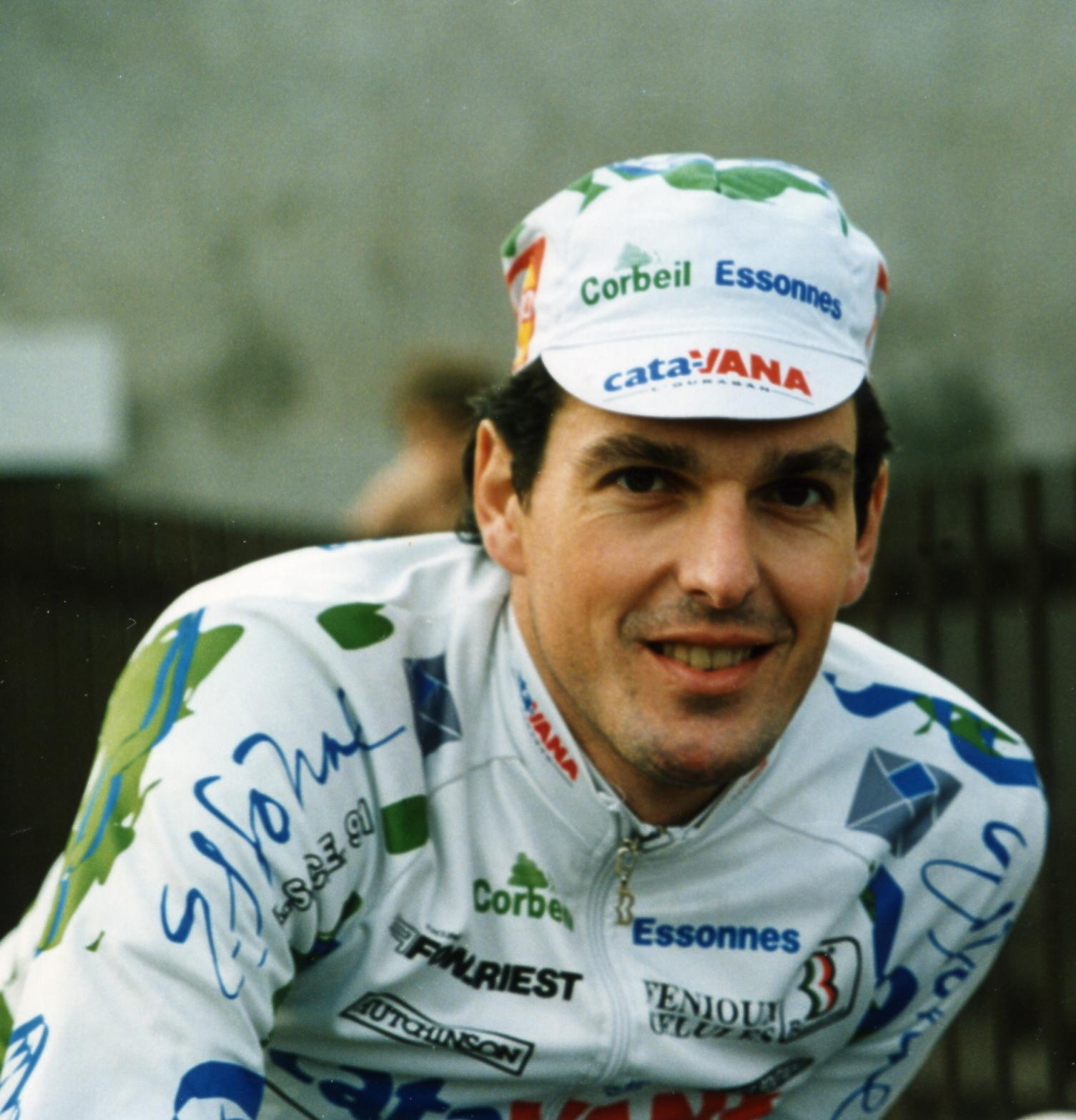

Personal information
- Born: 1 January 1966 (age 60) Amboise, France

Cycling career
- Sport: Cycling
- Discipline: Road
- Role: Rider

Amateur teams
- 1985: VC La Riche
- 1986: ASC Air
- 1987: AC Boulogne–Billancourt
- 1993: UC Châteauroux

Professional teams
- 1988–1989: Fagor–MBK
- 1990: Z–Tomasso
- 1991: Mosoca–Eurocar–Chazal
- 1994: Catavana–AS Corbeil–Essonnes–Cedico

Franck Boucanville (born 1 January 1966) is a French former professional racing cyclist.

== Major results ==
1984
1st Grand Prix Cristal Energie
1986
1st Stage 1 Circuit des Mines
1987
1st Paris–Roubaix Espoirs
8th GP Ouest-France
1988
2nd Bordeaux–Caudéran
1989
1st Grand Prix de Cholet-Mauléon-Moulins
1st Stage 7 Volta a Portugal
3rd A Travers le Morbihan
3rd Bordeaux–Caudéran
1990
4th Overall Tour d'Armorique
4th A Travers le Morbihan
5th Overall Paris–Bourges
1991
1st Stage 3 Circuit Cycliste Sarthe
1992
3rd A Travers le Morbihan
3rd Bordeaux–Caudéran
4th Grand Prix de Denain
1993
1st Stage 3 Tour du Loir-et-Cher
1994
1st Stage 4b Quatre Jours de l'Aisne
8th Overall Tour d'Armorique
