= Paris–Roubaix Espoirs =

French one-day road cycling race

Race details
- Date: May
- Region: France
- English name: Paris–Roubaix U23
- Discipline: Road
- Competition: UCI Europe Tour
- Type: One-day race
- Web site: www.veloclubroubaix.fr

History
- First edition: 1967
- Editions: 56 (as of 2026)
- First winner: Georges Pintens (BEL)
- Most wins: Taylor Phinney (USA) (2 wins)
- Most recent: Davide Donati (ITA)

Paris–Roubaix Espoirs is a one-day road cycling race held annually in France. In 2005 the race was integrated into the UCI Europe Tour as a category 1.2U race.

Held since 1967, it is the under-23 version of the Monument classic Paris–Roubaix and finishes at the Roubaix Velodrome. Winners who went on to become famous professionals include Yaroslav Popovych, Thor Hushovd, Stephen Roche, Frédéric Moncassin and Tom Pidcock.

== Winners ==
Year	Country	Rider	Team
1967	Belgium	Georges Pintens	
1968	France	Alain Vasseur	
1969	France	Roger Desmaret	
1970	France	Enzo Mattioda	
1971	Belgium	Louis Verreydt	
1972	Belgium	Yvan Benaets	
1973	France	Patrick Béon	
1974	Belgium	Marc Steels	
1975	Belgium	Pol Verschuere	
1976	France	Gérard Simonnot	
1977	France	Michel Lloret	
1978	Belgium	Alfons De Wolf	
1979	France	Marc Madiot	
1980	Ireland	Stephen Roche	
1981	Belgium	Kenny De Maerteleire	
1982	Belgium	Rudy Rogiers	
1983	Belgium	Frank Verleyen	
1984	France	Thierry Marie	
1985	France	Christian Chaubet	
1986	France	Vincent Thorey	
1987	France	Franck Boucanville	
1988	France	Laurent Bezault	
1989	France	Frédéric Moncassin	
1990	France	Thierry Gouvenou	
1991	France	Eric Larue	
1992	France	Pascal Chanteur	
1993	Poland	Marek Leśniewski	
1994	Belgium	Kurt Dhont	
1995	France	Damien Nazon	
1996	Belgium	Dany Baeyens	
1997	Belgium	Marc Chanoine	
1998	Norway	Thor Hushovd	
1999	France	Sébastien Joly	
2000	Germany	Eric Baumann	Germany (national team)
2001	Ukraine	Yaroslav Popovych	Zoccorinese-Vellutex
2002	Russia	Mikhail Timochine	Zoccorinese-Vellutex
2003	Uzbekistan	Sergey Lagutin	Uzbekistan (national team)
2004	Netherlands	Koen de Kort	Rabobank GS3
2005	Russia	Dmitry Kozonchuk	Rabobank Continental Team
2006	Netherlands	Tom Veelers	Rabobank Continental Team
2007	France	Damien Gaudin	Vendée U
2008	Netherlands	Coen Vermeltfoort	Rabobank Continental Team
2009	United States	Taylor Phinney	Trek–Livestrong
2010	United States	Taylor Phinney	Trek–Livestrong
2011	Netherlands	Ramon Sinkeldam	Rabobank Continental Team
2012	Luxembourg	Bob Jungels	Leopard–Trek Continental Team
2013	No race		
2014	Netherlands	Mike Teunissen	Rabobank Development Team
2015	Switzerland	Lukas Spengler	BMC Development Team
2016	Italy	Filippo Ganna	Team Colpack
2017	Netherlands	Nils Eekhoff	Development Team Sunweb
2018	Belgium	Stan Dewulf	Lotto–Soudal U23
2019	Great Britain	Tom Pidcock	Team Wiggins Le Col
2020– 2021	No race due to the COVID-19 pandemic in France		
2022	No race due to organisational reasons		
2023	Belgium	Tijl De Decker	Lotto–Dstny Development Team
2024	Germany	Tim Torn Teutenberg	Lidl–Trek Future Racing
2025	Denmark	Albert Philipsen	Lidl–Trek Future Racing
2026	Italy	Davide Donati	Red Bull–Bora–Hansgrohe Rookies
