= Armée de terre (cycling team) =

French cycling team

Team information
- UCI code: ADT
- Registered: France
- Founded: 2011
- Disbanded: 2017
- Discipline: Road
- Status: UCI Continental
- Bicycles: Cipollini
- Website: Team home page

Team name history
- 2011–2017: Armée de terre
Armée de terre jersey
Jersey

Armée de terre, officially Équipe cycliste Armée de terre, (UCI team code: ADT) was a French UCI Continental cycling team. It was sponsored by the French Army and all the cyclists were professional soldiers. After competing with success in the French amateur structure, the team was registered as a Continental-level team from the beginning of the 2015 road cycling season until its disbandment at the end of the 2017 season.

== History ==
=== Amateur racing ===
The team was founded in 2010 by David Lima Da-Costa following a long history of the French Army supporting soldiers in their cycling careers, with the team's first season of racing being the 2012 cycling season. It was founded with the intention of aiding in the Army's recruitment efforts. The team offered unusual benefits to its riders, such as a potential career in the Army, accommodation and training facilities rarely provided by a domestic team. The team received approximately 40 applications from riders wishing to join it for its first season, which included top-level amateurs and some professional riders. The hiring process was made more complicated by the requirement to enlist the riders as soldiers.

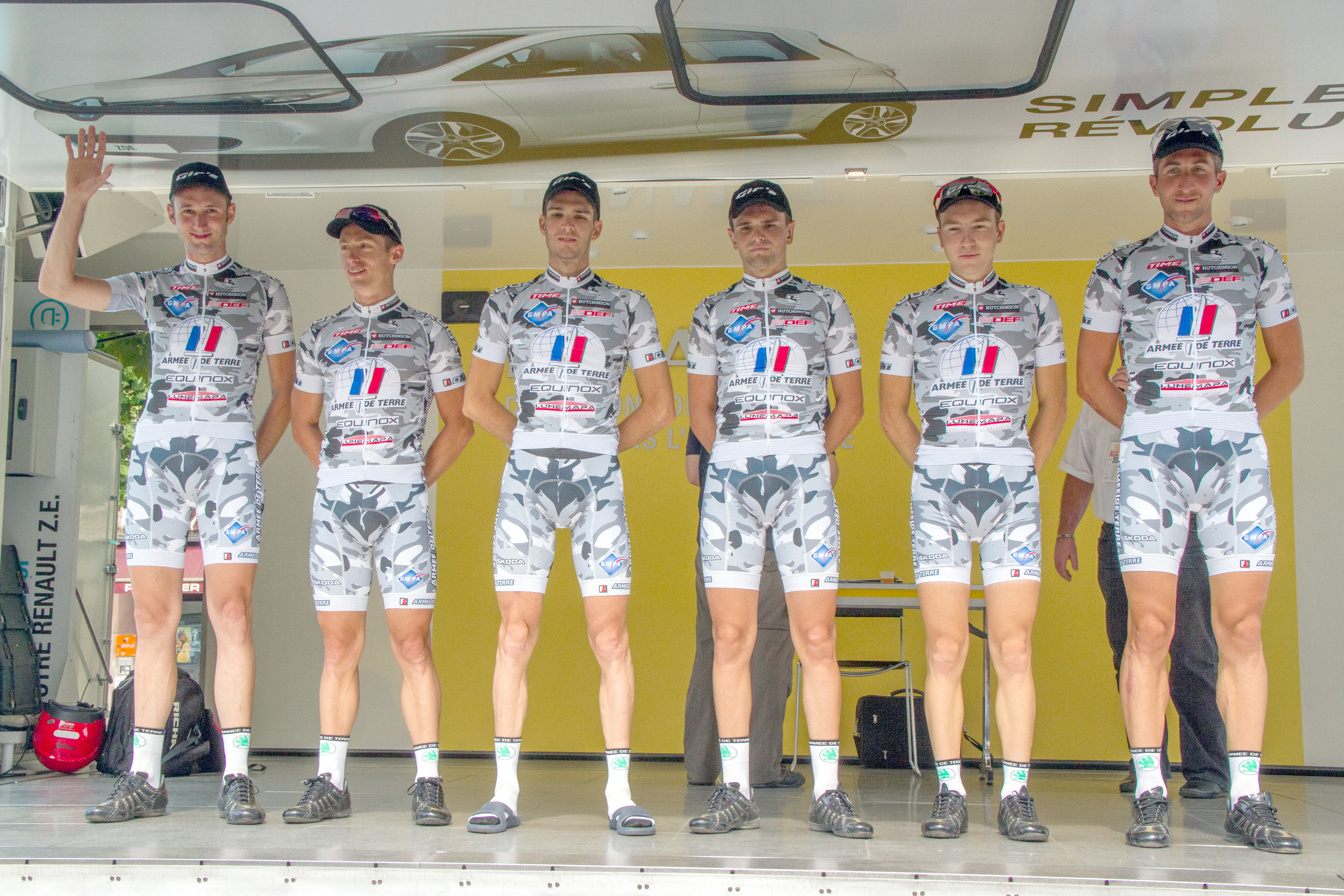
Armée de terre riders at the 2013 Tour Alsace

The team had a budget that would have supported a Continental team, but the management initially chose to set the team up to compete in the French domestic championship, the Division Nationale. In the team's first season, it finished fourth in the second division of the Division Nationale and was promoted to the first division for the 2012 season. After 22 victories in 2012, the team finished a close second in the 2013 Coupe de France Division Nationale 1, finishing behind Vendée U despite leading for three quarters of the season. The team went on to dominate the 2014 domestic racing season in France, winning 61 races as they won the amateur Coupe de France.

=== Continental team ===
Having received continued support from the military leadership for another four years, the team began exploring promotion to become a UCI Continental team, with support from civilian sponsors. The success of this application was announced in December 2014, with the team finding out through a leak to the press. This promotion was complicated by the rules about French cyclists. Riders on UCI Continental teams are not considered professionals by the UCI, but the rules of French cycling mandate professional contracts for them. Since the riders on Armée de terre are soldiers rather than professional cyclists, a special exception had to be made to allow the team to compete. The team retained several of its riders from the 2014 season into the international ranks, including French under-23 champion Yann Guyot. The riders continued to live in the team's base, two to each room; if a race did not provide accommodation to the riders, they stayed in the nearest military barracks. Each rider did military training in the two months of the off-season, learning a military specialism as well as training as a cyclist.

The team's jersey in this as in previous years is a camouflage design promoting the team's military foundation. The team's bicycles, provided by Mario Cipollini's company, are also decorated with a camouflage pattern.

The team made its debut at this level in the 2.1-ranked Étoile de Bessèges. They then rode the 2015 Tour du Haut Var, where Quentin Pacher finished fifteenth overall and won the white jersey for the best young rider. The following weekend, the team achieved top 10 results in two French races: eighth place in the Classic Sud-Ardèche for Romain Combaud and seventh in the La Drôme Classic for Yann Guyot, who was the leading group behind the race winner, Samuel Dumoulin (AG2R La Mondiale).

The team's first victory came at the Tour du Loir-et-Cher, where Guyot won stage 3 in a two-man sprint.

== Team roster ==
Rider	Date of birth
Bryan Alaphilippe (FRA)	August 17, 1995 (age 31)
Romain Campistrous (FRA)	July 16, 1992 (age 34)
Fabien Canal (FRA)	April 4, 1989 (age 37)
Bastien Duculty (FRA)	November 28, 1992 (age 33)
Thibault Ferasse (FRA)	September 12, 1994 (age 31)
Damien Gaudin (FRA)	August 20, 1986 (age 40)
Yann Guyot (FRA)	February 26, 1986 (age 40)
Morgan Kneisky (FRA)	August 31, 1987 (age 39)
Romain Le Roux (FRA)	July 3, 1992 (age 34)
Kévin Lebreton (FRA)	October 30, 1993 (age 32)

Rider	Date of birth
Jordan Levasseur (FRA)	May 29, 1995 (age 31)
Julien Loubet (FRA)	January 11, 1985 (age 41)
Jérôme Mainard (FRA)	August 25, 1986 (age 40)
Stéphane Poulhies (FRA)	June 26, 1985 (age 41)
Jimmy Raibaud (FRA)	November 13, 1991 (age 34)
Thomas Rostollan (FRA)	March 18, 1986 (age 40)
Kévin Sireau (FRA)	April 18, 1987 (age 39)
Benjamin Thomas (FRA)	September 12, 1995 (age 30)
Steven Tronet (FRA)	October 14, 1986 (age 39)
Yannis Yssaad (FRA)	June 25, 1993 (age 33)

=== Riders' military ranks ===
As the members of the Armée de terre team were all soldiers as well as cyclists, they all had military ranks. Most of them were graded as soldat de deuxième classe, the lowest rank in the French Army. Barbas, Le Roux and Levasseur were soldats de première classe, the next highest rank; Combaud and Guyot were caporaux, while Sinner held the equivalent rank of brigadier; Canal was a caporal-chef. The highest-ranked rider was Julien Gonnet, who was a sergent-chef.

== Major wins ==
2014
Stage 1 Kreiz Breizh Elites, Kévin Lebreton
Grand Prix des Marbriers, Yann Guyot

2015
Stage 3 Tour du Loir-et-Cher, Yann Guyot

2016
Stage 4 Rhône-Alpes Isère Tour, Yannis Yssaad
Stage 6 Le Tour de Bretagne Cycliste trophée harmonie Mutuelle, Thomas Rostollan
Stage 4 Tour de Normandie, Benoit Sinner

2017
Paris–Troyes, Yannis Yssaad
Stage 6 Tour de Normandie, Damien Gaudin
Tour du Finistère, Julien Loubet
Tro-Bro Léon, Damien Gaudin
Stage 4 Tour de Bretagne, Damien Gaudin
Paris–Mantes-en-Yvelines, Fabien Canal
Stage 3 Four Days of Dunkirk, Benjamin Thomas
Overall Paris–Arras Tour, Jordan Levasseur

Stage 3, Jordan Levasseur

Stage 6 An Post Rás, Yannis Yssaad
Prologue Tour de Luxembourg, Damien Gaudin
Stage 2 Ronde de l'Oise, Yannis Yssaad
Stage 4 Ronde de l'Oise, Jordan Levasseur
Stage 1 Route du Sud, Julien Loubet
Stages 1 & 3a Troféu Joaquim Agostinho, Yannis Yssaad
Stage 1 Tour de Wallonie, Benjamin Thomas
Prologue Volta a Portugal em Bicicleta, Damien Gaudin
Stage 3 Volta a Portugal, Bryan Alaphilippe
