= Kévin Lalouette =

French cyclist

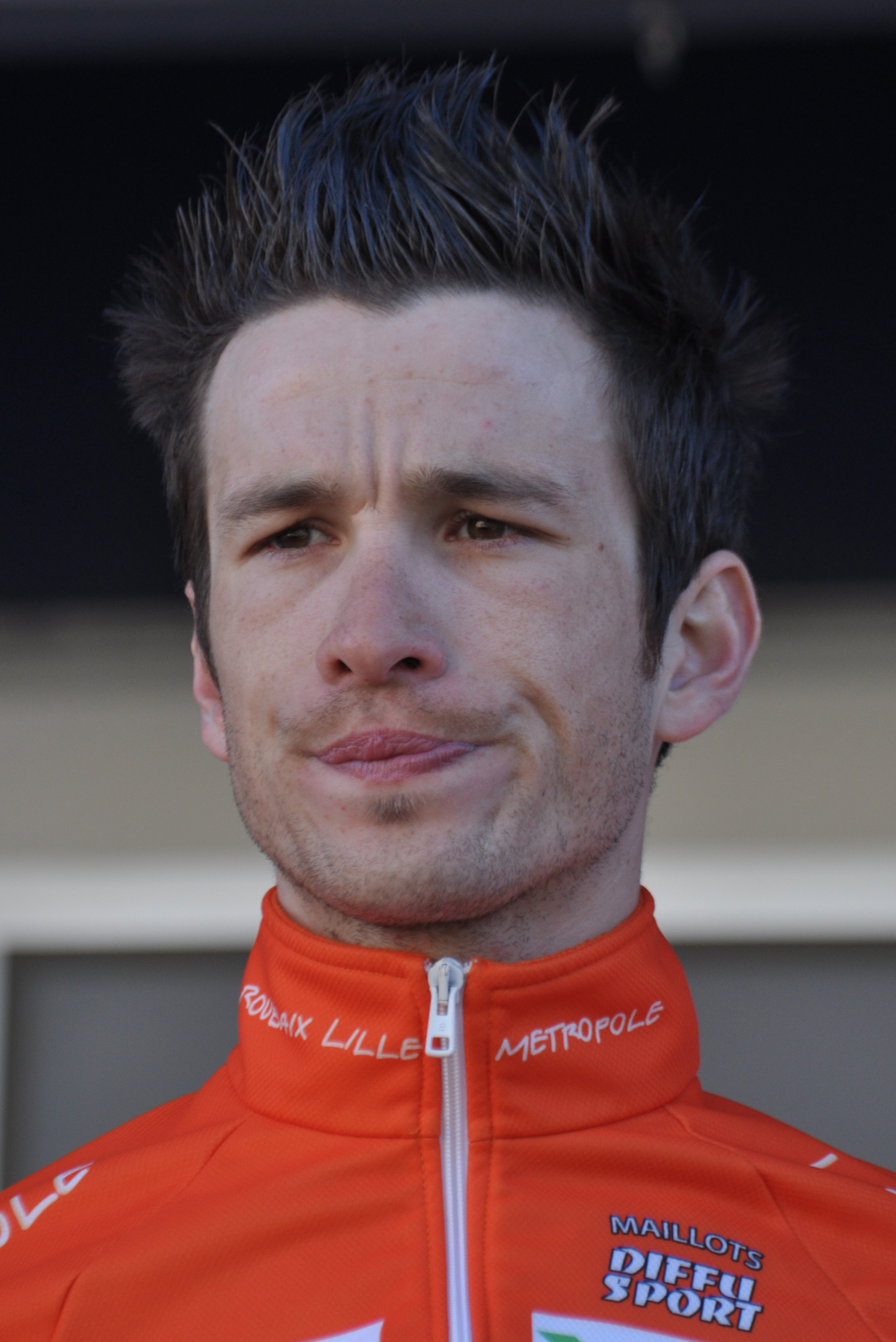
- Lalouette in 2013

Personal information
- Full name: Kévin Lalouette
- Born: 18 February 1984 (age 42) Abbeville, France

Cycling career
- Sport: Cycling
- Current team: Retired
- Discipline: Road
- Role: Rider

Amateur teams
- 2003–2008: CC Nogent-sur-Oise
- 2009–2010: USSA Pavilly Barentin
- 2014–2015: USSA Pavilly Barentin
- 2016: EC Raismes Petite-Forêt
- 2017–2018: CC Nogent-sur-Oise

Professional team
- 2011–2013: Roubaix–Lille Métropole

Kévin Lalouette (born 18 February 1984 in Abbeville) is a French former professional road and track cyclist.

== Major results ==
2005
6th La Côte Picarde
2006
6th Grand Prix de la ville de Nogent-sur-Oise
9th Paris–Troyes
2008
5th Grand Prix de la ville de Pérenchies
2009
2nd Overall Mi-Août en Bretagne
2nd Grand Prix des Marbriers
2010
2nd Overall Mi-Août en Bretagne
2nd Grand Prix des Marbriers
7th Overall Ronde de l'Oise
2011
2nd Overall Ronde de l'Oise
2014
3rd Grand Prix des Marbriers
2016
1st Circuit de Wallonie
5th Grand Prix des Marbriers
