= Thomas Rostollan =

French cyclist

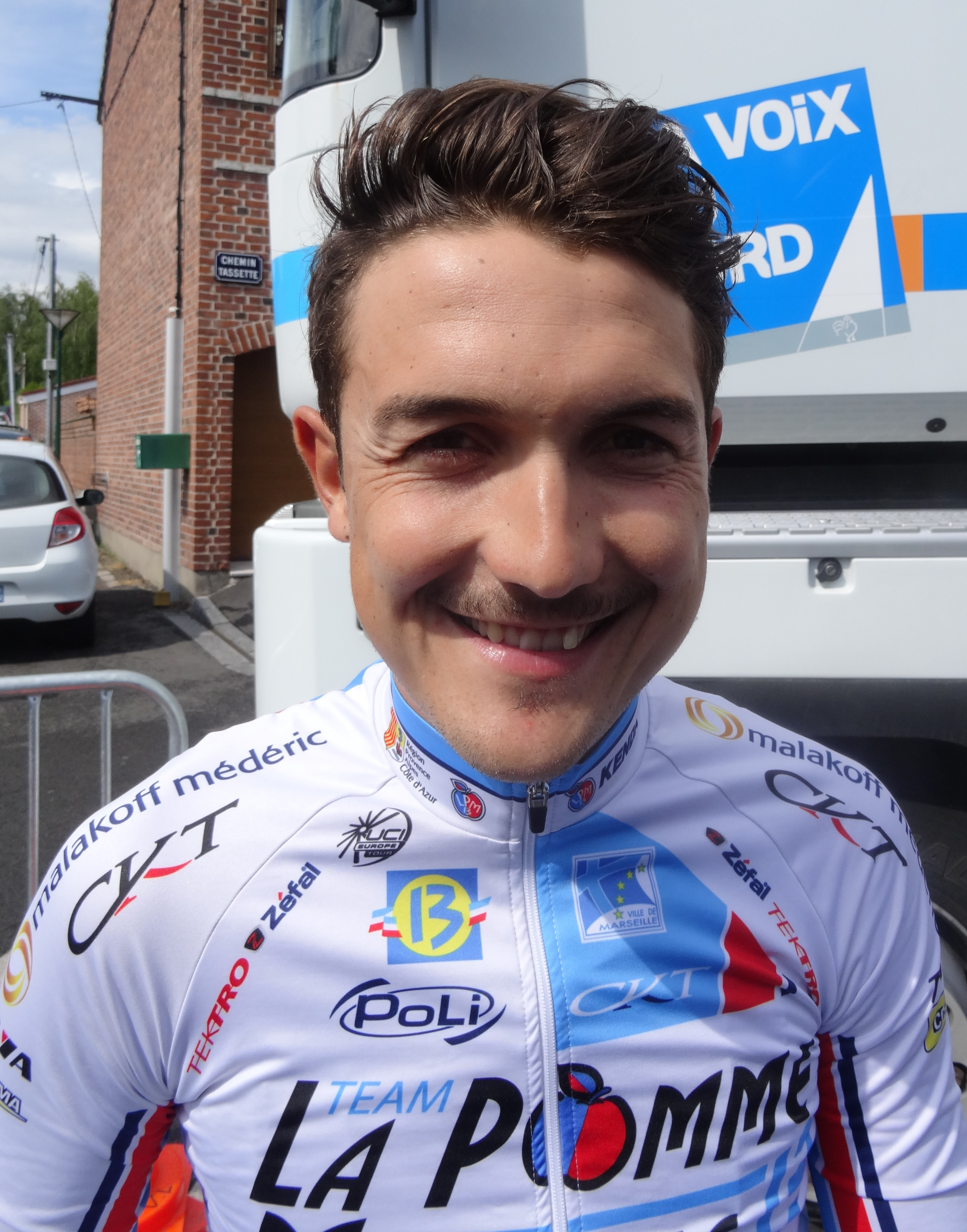
- Rostollan in 2014

Personal information
- Full name: Thomas Rostollan
- Born: 18 March 1986 (age 40) Marseille, France

Cycling career
- Sport: Cycling
- Current team: Retired
- Discipline: Road
- Role: Rider

Amateur teams
- 2003: Pédale Gombertoise
- 2004: AVC Aix-en-Provence
- 2005–2006: Chambéry CF
- 2007: Vélo-Club La Pomme Marseille
- 2008–2012: AVC Aix-en-Provence
- 2015: AVC Aix-en-Provence

Professional teams
- 2013–2014: La Pomme Marseille
- 2016–2017: Armée de Terre

Thomas Rostollan (born 18 March 1986) is a French former professional road racing cyclist, who rode professionally in 2013 and 2014 for Team La Pomme Marseille 13, and in 2016 and 2017 for the Armée de Terre team.

== Major results ==
2008
1st Overall Grand Prix Chantal Biya

1st Young rider classification
1st Stage 1

2009
1st Stage 1 Vuelta a Navarra
2010
2nd Overall Circuit des Ardennes
2012
2nd Overall An Post Rás

1st Stage 5

4th Scandinavian Race Uppsala
2014
1st Sprints classification Tour du Gévaudan Languedoc-Roussillon
10th Overall Paris–Arras Tour
2015
1st Grand Prix Cristal Energie
1st Mountains classification Tour du Loir-et-Cher
2016
1st Stage 6 Tour de Bretagne
2017
5th Overall Tour du Loir-et-Cher
7th Overall Rás Tailteann
