= Grand Prix des Marbriers =

French one-day road cycling race

Race details
- Date: August
- Region: Bellignies, France
- Discipline: Road race
- Competition: UCI Europe Tour (2008–2019); National calendar (2021–)
- Type: One day race
- Organiser: VC Bavay

History
- First edition: 1961
- Editions: 62 (as of 2022)
- First winner: Michel Prissette (FRA)
- Most wins: Michel Prissette (FRA); Yves Lepachelet (FRA); René Bleuze (FRA); Philippe Delaurier (FRA) (3 wins)
- Most recent: Kévin Avoine (FRA)

The Grand Prix des Marbriers is a road bicycle race held annually in France. It was organized as a 1.2 event on the UCI Europe Tour between 2008 and 2019. After being cancelled in 2020, the race returned the following year but was moved to the national amateur calendar.

== Winners ==
Year	Country	Rider	Team
1961	France	Michel Prissette	
1962	France	Michel Prissette	
1963	France	Michel Prissette	
1964	France	Yves Lepachelet	
1965	France	Yves Lepachelet	
1966	France	René Bleuze	
1967	France	Yves Lepachelet	
1968	France	Michel Quinchon	
1969	Belgium	Bernard Delchambre	
1970	Belgium	Willy Teirlinck	Sonolor–Lejeune
1971	Belgium	Christian De Buysschere	
1972	Belgium	Daniel Pauwels	
1973	France	Bernard Delaurier	
1974	France	René Bleuze	
1975	France	Jean-Philippe Pipart	
1976	Belgium	Marnix Furnière	
1977	France	René Bleuze	
1978	France	Guy Leleu	
1979	France	Bernard Stoessel	
1980	France	Alain Deloeuil	
1981	France	Patrice Collinet	
1982	France	Thierry Barrault	
1983	France	Alain Deloeuil	
1984	France	Patrice Esnault	
1985	Belgium	Marc Seynaeve	
1986	France	Manuel Carneiro	
1987	France	Philippe Delaurier	
1988	France	Claude Carlin	ASPTT Paris
1989	France	Philippe Delaurier	
1990	France	Jean-François Laffillé	
1991	Poland	Zdisław Wrona	
1992	Finland	Mika Hietanen	
1993	France	Michel Lallouet	
1994	France	Jean-François Laffillé	
1995	France	Philippe Delaurier	
1996	No race due to a criterium being held instead		
1997	France	Grégory Barbier	
1998	France	Benoît Poilvet	Jean Floc'h–Mantes
1999	France	Pascal Pofilet	
2000	France	Grégory Faghel	
2001	France	Pascal Pofilet	
2002	France	Nicolas Dumont	
2003	France	Stéphane Pétilleau	Jean Floc'h–Mantes
2004	Finland	Jussi Veikkanen	VC Roubaix
2005	France	Julien Guiborel	
2006	France	Benoît Daeninck	UV Aube
2007	France	Sébastien Harbonnier	
2008	Belgium	Ben Hermans	Davo
2009	Germany	Robert Retschke	Continental Team Differdange
2010	Canada	Keven Lacombe	SpiderTech–Planet Energy
2011	France	Pierre Drancourt	ESEG Douai
2012	Russia	Sergey Pomoshnikov	Itera–Katusha
2013	France	Benoît Daeninck	CC Nogent-sur-Oise
2014	France	Yann Guyot	Armée de Terre
2015	Netherlands	Tim Ariesen	Cyclingteam Jo Piels
2016	Belgium	Emiel Planckaert	Lotto–Soudal U23
2017	Poland	Karol Domagalski	ONE Pro Cycling
2018	Great Britain	Jon Mould	JLT–Condor
2019	Great Britain	Damien Clayton	Ribble Pro Cycling
2020	No race due to the COVID-19 pandemic		
2021	Belgium	Luca Van Boven	Lotto–Soudal U23
2022	France	Kévin Avoine	CC Nogent-sur-Oise
