= Grand Prix de la Ville de Lillers =

French road bicycle race

Race details
- Date: Early-March
- Region: Nord-Pas-de-Calais, France
- Local name: Grand Prix de la Ville de Lillers (in French)
- Nickname: Souvenir Bruno Comini
- Discipline: Road race
- Competition: UCI Europe Tour
- Type: Single-day
- Web site: www.gp2lillers.fr

History
- First edition: 1964
- Editions: 60 (as of 2026)
- First winner: Claude Rigaut (FRA)
- Most wins: Jean-François Laffillée (FRA); Benoît Daeninck (FRA) (3 wins)
- Most recent: Jules Hesters (BEL)

Grand Prix de la Ville de Lillers is a road bicycle race held annually near Lillers, a commune in the Nord-Pas-de-Calais region of France. The editions 1964–1995 were reserved for amateurs. Since 2005, it is rated 1.2 on the UCI Europe Tour. The race was not held in 2015 because of financial difficulties, 2019 because of a storm and in 2021 because of the COVID pandemic.

== Winners ==
Year	Country	Rider	Team
1964	France	Claude Rigaut	
1965	France	Jean Reveillon	
1966	France	Patrick Cuny	
1967	France	Jacques-André Hochart	
1968	France	André Mollet	
1969	France	Robert Mintkiewicz	
1970	France	M. Lefebvre	
1971	France	Guy Leleu	
1972	France	Claude Tollet	
1973	West Germany	Klaus-Peter Thaler	
1974	France	Alain Molmy	
1975	Belgium	Eddy Copmans	
1976	France	Jacques Dutailly	
1977	France	Claude Bavaye	
1978	France	Olivier Vantielcke	
1979	Great Britain	Robert Millar	
1980	France	Philippe Miotti	
1981	France	Jean-Philippe Pipart	
1982	France	Jean-Philippe Pipart	
1983	Netherlands	Rinus Ansems	
1984	Denmark	Brian Holm	
1985	France	Jacques Dutailly	
1986	France	Vincent Thorey	
1987	France	Yvan Frebert	
1988	France	Bruno Bonnet	
1989	France	William Perard	
1990	France	Jean-François Laffillé	
1991	France	Jean-François Laffillé	
1992	Netherlands	Benny Gosink	
1993	Netherlands	Jeroen Blijlevens	
1994	France	Jean-François Laffillé	
1995	France	Grégory Barbier	
1996	Belgium	Nico Eeckhout	Collstrop-Lystex
1997	Belgium	Nico Eeckhout	Lotto–Mobistar–Isoglass
1998	Belgium	Geert Verheyen	Lotto–Mobistar
1999	Norway	Bjørnar Vestøl	Acceptcard Pro Cycling
2000	France	Francis Moreau	Cofidis
2001	France	Jean-Michel Tessier	Cofidis
2002	France	Pascal Deramé	Bonjour
2003	France	Damien Nazon	Brioches La Boulangère
2004	Belgium	Benny De Schrooder	Vlaanderen T-Interim
2005	Belgium	Johan Coenen	MrBookmaker.com-SportsTech
2006	Germany	Markus Eichler	Team Regiostrom-Senges
2007	France	Benoît Daeninck	UV Aube Troyes
2008	Germany	Dominic Klemme	Team 3C Gruppe
2009	Latvia	Aleksejs Saramotins	Team Designa Køkken
2010	France	Benoît Daeninck	Roubaix–Lille Métropole
2011	France	Denis Flahaut	Roubaix–Lille Métropole
2012	Great Britain	Russell Downing	Endura Racing
2013	France	Benoît Daeninck	CC Nogent-sur-Oise
2014	France	Steven Tronet	BigMat–Auber 93
2015	No race		
2016	Belgium	Stijn Steels	Topsport Vlaanderen–Baloise
2017	France	Thomas Boudat	Direct Énergie
2018	France	Jérémy Lecroq	Vital Concept
2019	No race due to stormy weather conditions		
2020	France	Florian Vachon	Arkéa–Samsic
2021	No race		
2022	Belgium	Milan Menten	Bingoal Pauwels Sauces WB
2023	Denmark	Andreas Stokbro	Leopard TOGT Pro Cycling
2025	France	Emmanuel Morin	Van Rysel–Roubaix
2025	Great Britain	Matthew Brennan	Visma–Lease a Bike Development
2026	Belgium	Jules Hesters	Team Flanders–Baloise
