= Rémi Cusin =

French cyclist (born 1986)

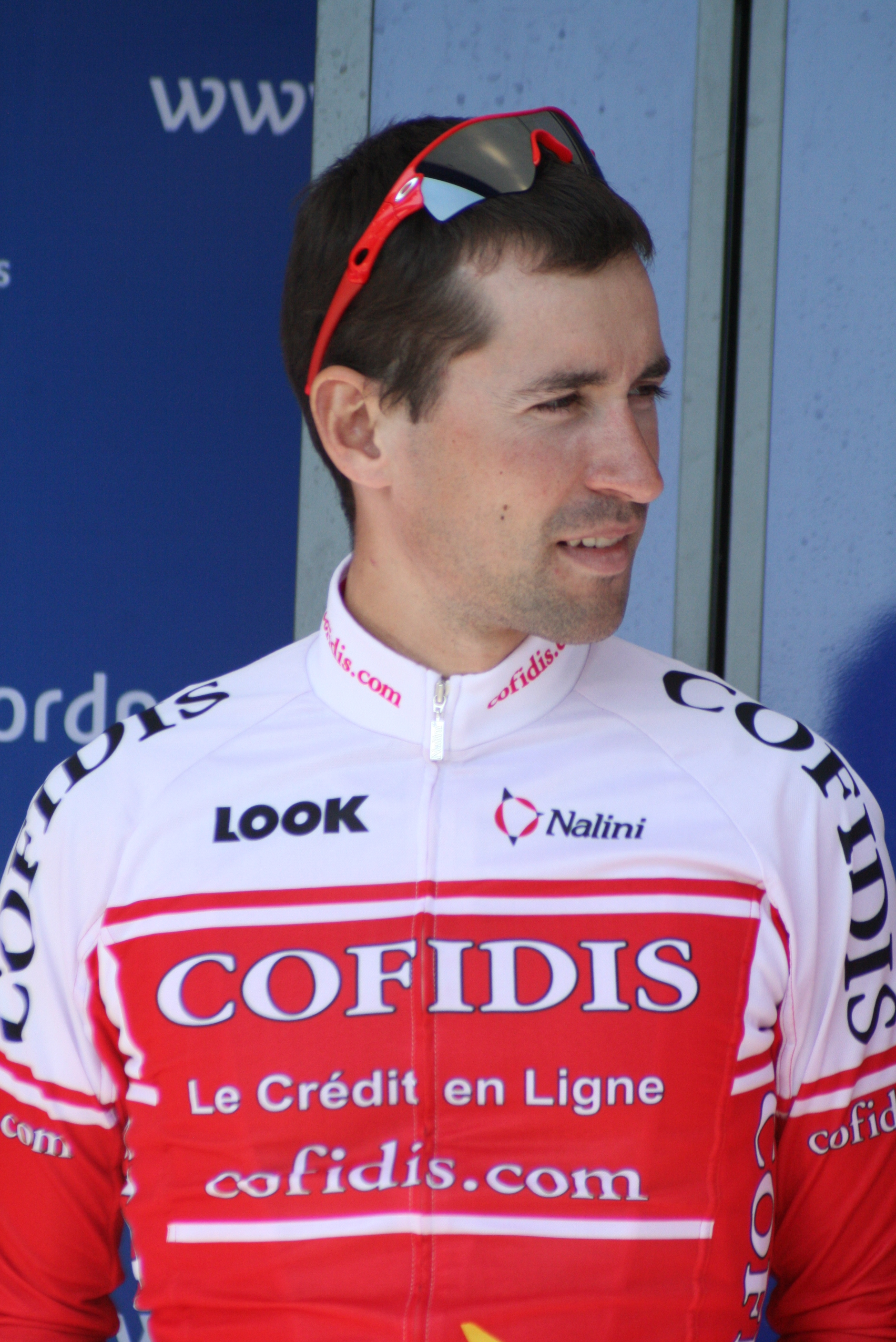
- Cusin at the 2011 Four Days of Dunkirk

Personal information
- Full name: Rémi Cusin
- Born: 3 February 1986 (age 40) Saint-Julien en Genevois, France

Cycling career
- Sport: Cycling
- Current team: Retired
- Discipline: Road
- Role: Rider

Amateur teams
- 2006–2008: VC Vaulx en Velin
- 2008: Agritubel (stagiaire)

Professional teams
- 2009: Agritubel
- 2010–2011: Cofidis
- 2012: Team Type 1–Sanofi
- 2013: IAM Cycling

Rémi Cusin (born 3 February 1986) is a French former professional road racing cyclist, who competed as a professional between 2009 and 2013. Cusin joined Cofidis for the 2010 and 2011 seasons, and in 2011 he scored his first UCI ProTour victory in the Tour of Denmark, where he won Stage 2.

Cusin retired at the end of the 2013 season.

== Palmarès ==
2009
2nd Le Samyn
7th, Les Boucles du Sud Ardèche
8th Overall Rhône-Alpes Isère Tour
2011
1st Stage 2 Danmark Rundt
8th Tour du Doubs
9th Overall Circuit de Lorraine
2012
6th Tour du Finistère
6th Overall Circuit de Lorraine
2013
3rd Tour de Berne
4th Tour du Finistère
5th Tro-Bro Léon
7th Grand Prix de Plumelec-Morbihan

Grand Tour general classification results timeline

Grand Tour	2010	2011	2012	2013
Giro d'Italia	82	—	—	—
Tour de France	—	—	—	—
Vuelta a España	—	—	—	—

Legend
—	Did not compete
DNF	Did not finish
