= Michael Reihs =

Danish cyclist (born 1979)

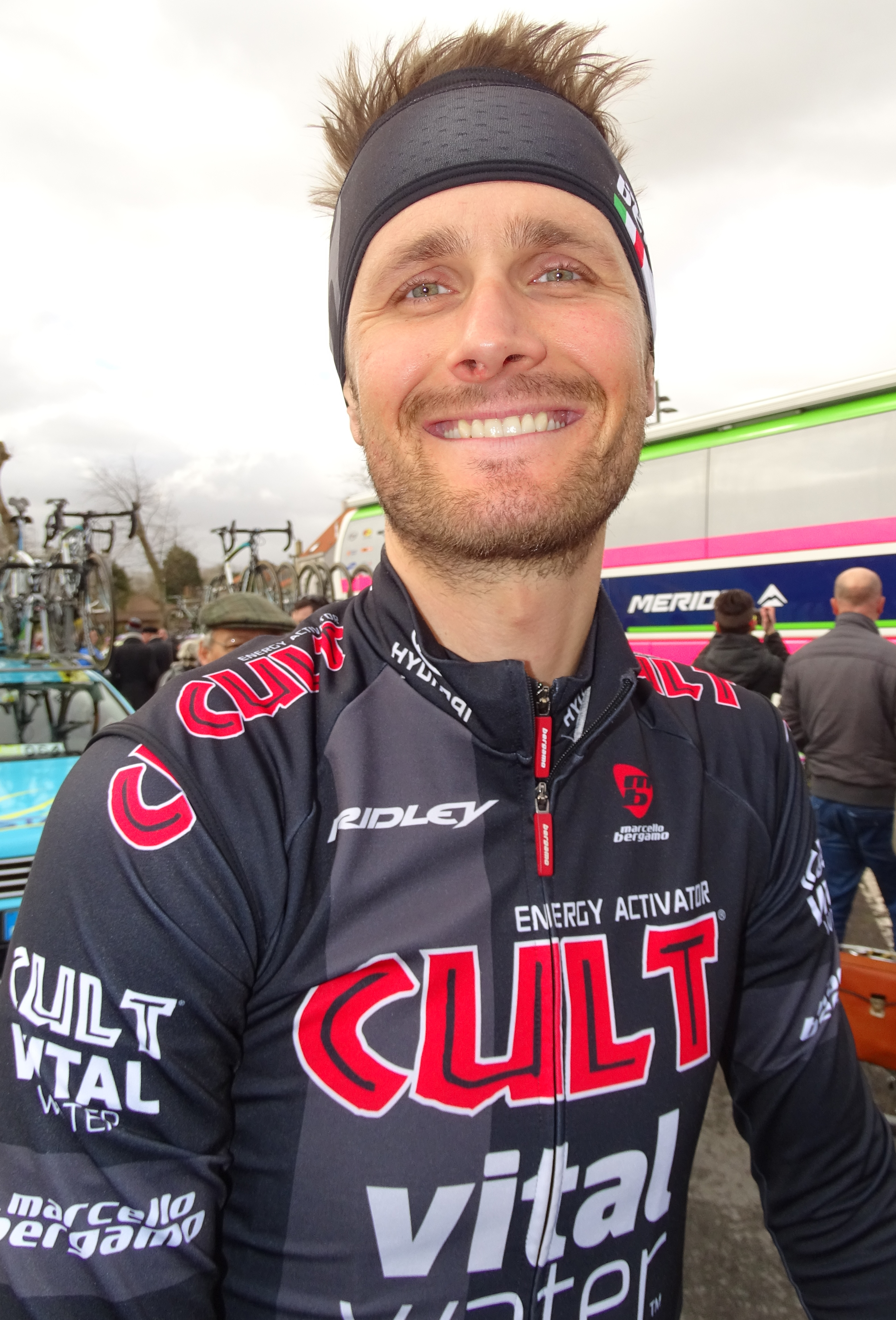
- Michael Reihs in 2015

Personal information
- Born: 25 April 1979 (age 47) Silkeborg, Denmark
- Height: 1.89 m (6 ft 2 in)
- Weight: 75 kg (165 lb)

Cycling career
- Sport: Cycling
- Current team: Retired
- Discipline: Road
- Role: Rider

Professional teams
- 2001–2002: Phonak
- 2003: Team Fakta
- 2005–2010: Team Designa Køkken
- 2011–2012: Christina Watches–Onfone
- 2013–2015: Team Cult Energy
- 2016: Stölting Service Group
- 2017: Team VéloCONCEPT

Michael Reihs (born 25 April 1979) is a Danish former professional racing cyclist.

== Major results ==
2005
2nd CSC Classic
6th GP Herning
9th Overall Tour du Loir-et-Cher
2006
3rd La Roue Tourangelle
6th GP Herning
2007
2nd Internatie Reningelst
3rd Boucle de l'Artois
7th Overall Ronde de l'Oise
7th GP Herning
2008
7th Ronde van Overijssel
2009
2nd Classic Loire Atlantique
2nd GP Herning
5th Overall Ronde de l'Oise
6th GP Bikebuster
8th Nokere Koerse
10th Paris–Troyes
10th Profronde van Fryslan
2010
1st Stage 6 La Tropicale Amissa Bongo
4th Rogaland GP
5th GP Herning
7th La Roue Tourangelle
9th Grand Prix de la ville de Pérenchies
2011
1st Himmerland Rundt
2nd GP Herning
3rd Road race, National Road Championships
6th Tartu GP
2012
5th Himmerland Rundt
2013
9th GP Herning
2015
6th GP Horsens
2016
8th GP Horsens
