= Claude Carlin =

French cyclist

Personal information
- Born: 17 January 1961 (age 65) Argentan, France

Cycling career
- Sport: Cycling

Amateur teams
- 1977-1979: VC Argentan
- 1980-1981: CS Villedieu-les-Poêles
- 1982-1989: ASPTT Paris
- 1990-1995: VC Saint-Lô Pont Hébert

Major wins
- French National Road Race Amateur Championship 1986

Claude Carlin (born 17 January 1961) is a French former cyclist. He competed at the 1984 Summer Olympics and the 1988 Summer Olympics.
