= Niki Østergaard =

Danish cyclist

Personal information
- Full name: Niki Østergaard
- Born: January 21, 1988 (age 38) Horsens, Denmark

Cycling career
- Sport: Cycling
- Discipline: Road
- Role: Rider

Professional team
- 2007–2010: Team GLS
- 2010–2013: Glud & Marstrand–LRØ Radgivning

Niki Østergaard (born January 21, 1988) is a Danish former professional road racing cyclist who last rode for Team Cult Energy.

== Biography ==
Østergaard placed second in the 2006 Junior World Championships, held in Spa, Belgium. He finished with a time of 3 hours, 8 minutes and 59 seconds, which was nine seconds behind the champion, Italy's Diego Ulissi.

At the age of 19, Østergaard came sixth in the 2007 Giro delle Regioni, a top level Under-23 race as a member of Team GLS.

After competing with Team GLS during the 2007 and 2008 seasons, he moved to Team Capinordic, where in August 2009, he won three stages in four days in a National series of races in Denmark.

Østergaard retired at the end of the 2013 season, after seven years as a professional.
