= Philippe Delaurier =

French cyclist

Personal information
- Born: 12 December 1960 (age 65) Cambrai, France

Cycling career
- Sport: Cycling
- Role: Rider

Philippe Delaurier (born 12 December 1960) is a French former professional racing cyclist. He rode in the 1986 Tour de France.
