= Christina Watches–Dana =

Team information
- UCI code: CWO
- Registered: Denmark
- Founded: 2009
- Disbanded: 2014
- Discipline: Road
- Status: Continental
- Bicycles: Viner

Key personnel
- General manager: Claus Hembo
- Team managers: Bo Hamburger; Claus Hembo

Team name history
- 2009–2010 2011 2012-13 2014: Stenca Trading–M1; Christina Watches; Christina Watches–Onfone; Christina Watches–Kuma

Christina Watches–Dana was a Danish professional cycling team based in Herning that competed on the UCI Continental Circuits. The captain of the team was Michael Rasmussen, who won the climbers jersey at the 2005 and 2006 Tour de France, until he ended his career in early 2013.

Christina Watches was owned by the Danish watch designer Christina Hembo, who bought the Danish UCI continental team Stenca–M1 in December 2010.

On 9 October 2014 Cyclingnews.com reported that the team will fold after the 2014 season as the team owners have chosen to sponsor a handball team. 0711 / Cycling, a team also sponsored by Christina Jewelry & Watches, folded in 2018.

== Victories ==
2011
Himmerland Rundt, Michael Reihs
Tallinn–Tartu GP, Angelo Furlan
Stages 1, 4 & 5 Tour de Serbie, Angelo Furlan
Stage 3 Tour de Serbie, Michael Rasmussen

2012
Overall Tour de Serbie, Stefan Schumacher

Stage 3, Stefan Schumacher

Overall Tour of China I, Martin Pedersen

Stage 1 (TTT)

Overall Tour of China II, Stefan Schumacher

Prologue & Stage 4 (ITT), Stefan Schumacher

2013
Stage 1 Tour d'Algérie, Stefan Schumacher
Circuit d'Alger, Martin Pedersen
Overall Tour de Tipaza, Constantino Zaballa

Stage 1, Constantino Zaballa

Stage 3 Tour du Maroc, Morten Høberg
Destination Thy, Constantino Zaballa
Stage 2 Tour of Estonia, Angelo Furlan
Stage 3a (ITT) Sibiu Cycling Tour, Stefan Schumacher

2014
Stage 2 Szlakiem Grodów Piastowskich, Asbjørn Kragh
Stage 3 (ITT) Szlakiem Grodów Piastowskich, Stefan Schumacher
Stage 3 (ITT) Tour de Beauce, Stefan Schumacher

== Team roster ==
As of 31 December 2014.

Rider	Date of birth
Fortunato Baliani (ITA)	6 July 1974 (aged 40)
Jonathan Bellis (GBR)	16 August 1988 (aged 26)
Sebastian Forke (GER)	13 March 1987 (aged 27)
Marc Garby (DEN)	2 June 1991 (aged 23)
Alexander Kamp (DEN)	14 December 1993 (aged 21)
Asbjørn Kragh (DEN)	9 April 1992 (aged 22)
Jonas Poulsen (DEN)	3 April 1995 (aged 19)

Rider	Date of birth
Enrico Rossi (ITA)	5 May 1982 (aged 32)
Stefan Schumacher (GER)	21 July 1981 (aged 33)
Jimmi Sørensen (DEN)	7 November 1990 (aged 24)
Jake Tanner (GBR)	6 November 1991 (aged 23)
Stefano Usai (ITA)	26 October 1982 (aged 32)
Emil Wang (DEN)	27 August 1995 (aged 19)
Constantino Zaballa (ESP)	15 May 1978 (aged 36)
