= Jean-François Laffillé =

French cyclist

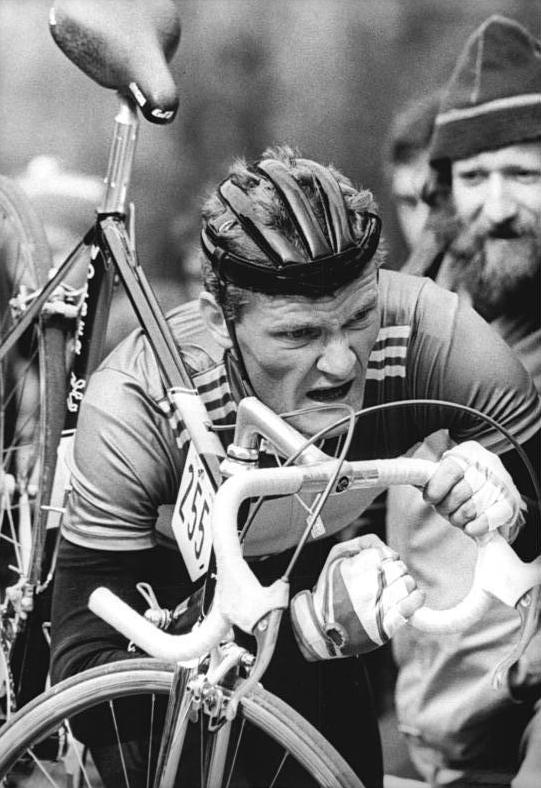
- Laffillé in the 1987 Peace Race

Personal information
- Born: 7 May 1962 (age 64) Eu, Seine-Maritime, France

Cycling career
- Sport: Cycling

Jean-François Laffillé (born 7 May 1962) is a French former cyclist. He competed in the road race at the 1988 Summer Olympics.
