= Maarten Tjallingii =

Racing cyclist

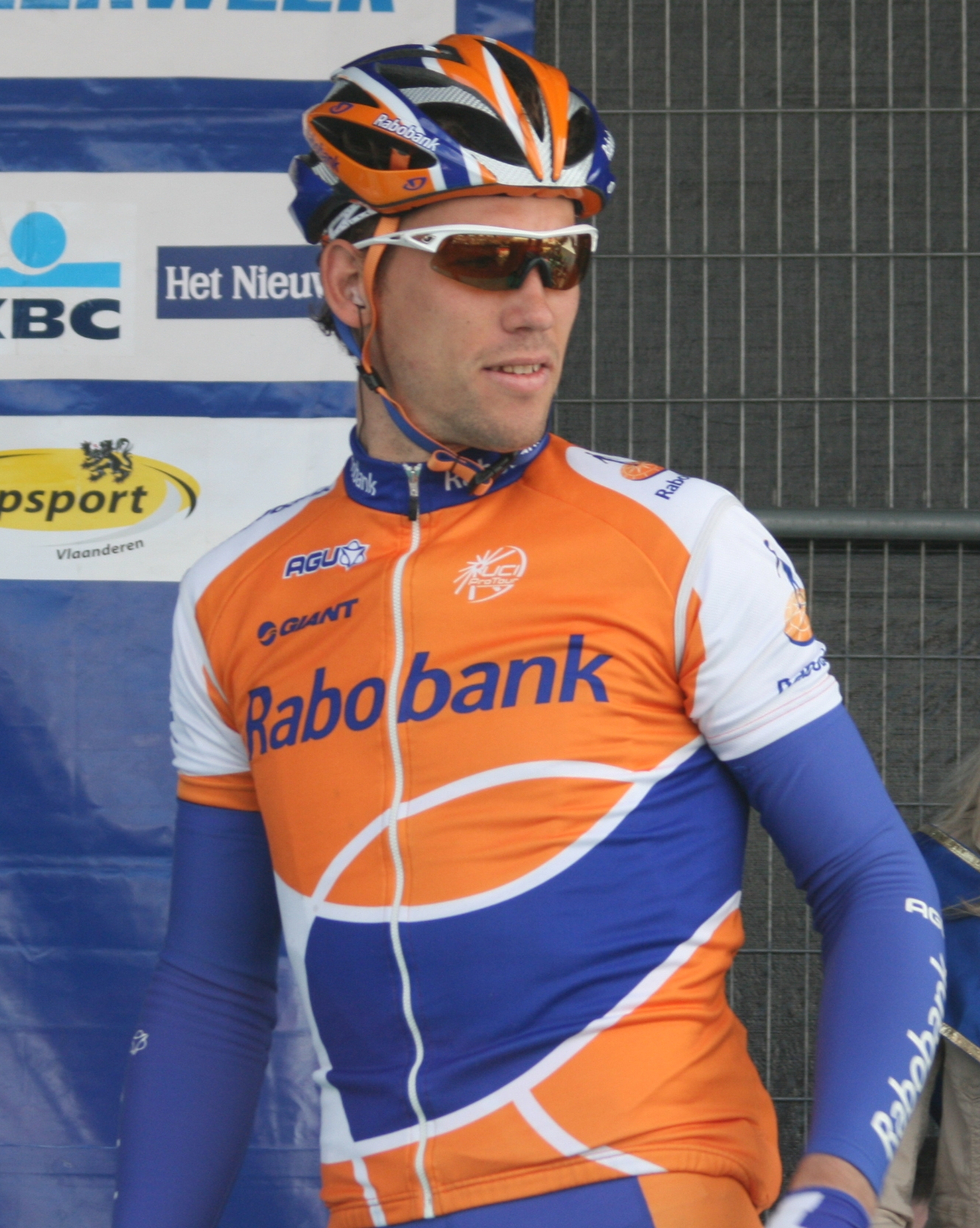
- Tjallingii at the 2009 E3 Prijs Vlaanderen

Personal information
- Full name: Maarten Pieter Tjallingii
- Born: 5 November 1977 (age 48) Leeuwarden, the Netherlands

Cycling career
- Sport: Cycling
- Disciplines: Road; Mountain biking
- Role: Rider
- Rider type: Rouleur; Breakaway specialist

Professional teams
- 2003–2005: Marco Polo
- 2006–2007: Skil–Shimano
- 2008: Silence–Lotto
- 2009–2016: Rabobank

Major wins
- Stage races Tour of Belgium (2006) Tour of Qinghai Lake (2006)

Maarten Pieter Tjallingii (/tʃəˈlɪŋɡi/ chə-LING-ghee; born 5 November 1977) is a Dutch former professional racing cyclist, who rode professionally between 2003 and 2016.

== Career ==
Maarten Tjallingii was born in Leeuwarden. He lost one of his kidneys as a child.

Tjallingii's biggest win was the 2006 Tour of Belgium. A frequent participant in breakaways in major races, his other most notable performances include a third place at the 2011 Paris–Roubaix and spending four days in the King of the Mountains jersey in the 2014 Giro d'Italia.

Tjallingii was selected to ride the 2012 Tour de France, but crashed on stage 3, he continued for another 40 kilometres (25 miles) and finished it over ten minutes behind the winner Peter Sagan. However he did not start stage 4, reportedly with a fractured left hip, becoming the third retirement of the 2012 Tour.

Tjallingii raced at the 2016 Giro d'Italia, which started in the Netherlands, and he made an impact on the early stages, winning the award for most aggressive rider on Stage 2 before taking the lead in the King of the Mountains competition on Stage 3, which finished 250 metres away from his home in Arnhem. He had previously announced that he would retire from racing in June, having signed a six-month contract extension with LottoNL–Jumbo for 2016.

== Major results ==
2001
3rd Overall Tour du Faso

1st Stage 2

2003
1st Overall Tour du Faso

1st Stage 1

1st Rund um Rhede
2004
2nd Cross-country, National Mountain Bike Championships
2005
5th Overall Tour of Qatar
2006
1st Overall Tour of Belgium

1st Stage 1

1st Overall Tour of Qinghai Lake

1st Stage 7

7th Overall Tour de Picardie
10th Overall Tour of Britain
2007
2nd Overall Tour of Belgium
4th Overall Danmark Rundt
6th Grote Prijs Gerrie Knetemann
7th Overall Four Days of Dunkirk
7th Overall Tour of Britain
7th Rund um den Henninger Turm
9th Omloop van het Houtland
10th Nokere Koerse
10th Ronde van het Groene Hart
2008
5th Profronde van Fryslan
6th Overall Tour of Belgium
7th Overall Tour of Qatar
2009
4th Grand Prix d'Isbergues
5th Overall Sachsen Tour
8th Overall Eneco Tour
2010
7th Overall Eneco Tour
2011
3rd Paris–Roubaix
2013
1st Stage 2 World Ports Classic
2014
Giro d'Italia

Held after Stages 2–5

2015
1st Grote Prijs Beeckman-De Caluwé
2016
Giro d'Italia

Held after Stage 3

=== Grand Tour general classification results timeline ===
| Grand Tour | 2008 | 2009 | 2010 | 2011 | 2012 | 2013 | 2014 | 2015 | 2016 |
|---|---|---|---|---|---|---|---|---|---|
| Giro d'Italia | — | 98 | — | — | — | 131 | 92 | 119 | 124 |
| Tour de France | — | — | 131 | 98 | DNF | — | — | — | — |
| Vuelta a España | 58 | — | — | — | — | — | 137 | DNF | — |

Legend
| — | Did not compete |
| DNF | Did not finish |

== Personal life ==
During his career, Tjallingii was one of the few known vegetarian cyclists.
