= 2005 Danmark Rundt =

(Denmark) 2005 Danmark Rundt
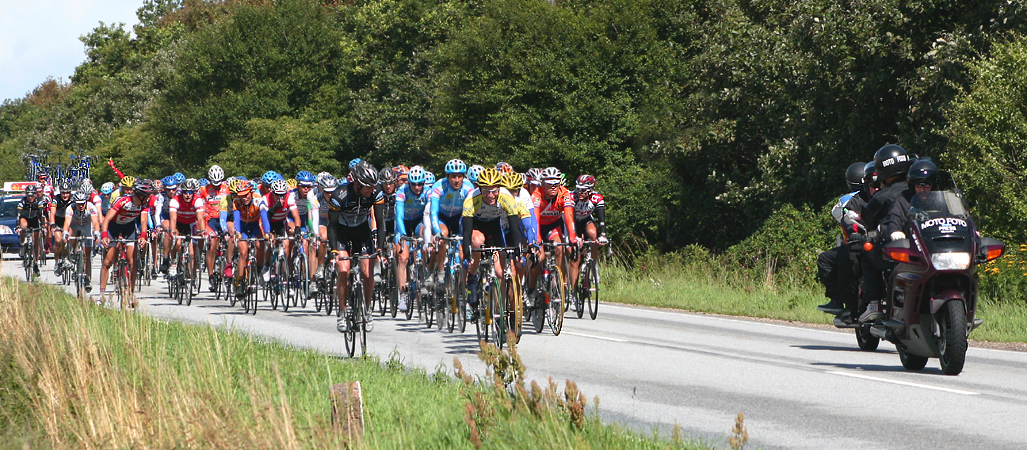
- The peloton near Randers on stage 2

Race details
- Dates: August 3–7, 2005
- Stages: 6
- Distance: 839 km (521.3 mi)
- Winning time: 19h 58' 37"

Results
Jersey awarded to the overall winner	Winner	Ivan Basso (ITA)	(Team CSC)
	Second	Kurt Asle Arvesen (NOR)	(Team CSC)
	Third	Rory Sutherland (AUS)	(Rabobank)
Jersey awarded to the points classification winner	Points	Ivan Basso (ITA)	(Team CSC)
Jersey awarded to the mountains classification winner	Mountains	Martin Müller (GER)	(Team Wiesenhof)
Jersey awarded to the youth classification winner	Youth	Rory Sutherland (AUS)	(Rabobank)
	Team	(Denmark) Team CSC	

The 2005 Danmark Rundt was ridden from 3 August to 7 August 2005. This edition is remembered for the complete dominance of Ivan Basso, who won 4 of the 6 stages, and the overall classification. It was the 15th edition of the men's stage race, which was established in 1985.

== Stages ==
The total length of the race was 848.8 km.

=== Stage 1: Skive – Skive (210 km) ===
#	Rider	Team	Nat.	Time
1	Ivan Basso	Team CSC	Italy	in 4h55'13"
2	André Greipel	Team Wiesenhof	Germany	at 9"
3	Kurt Asle Arvesen	Team CSC	Norway	s.t.
4	Jens-Erik Madsen	Glud & Marstrand–Horsens	Denmark	s.t.
5	Paride Grillo	Paniare Navigare	Italy	s.t.
Full result

=== Stage 2: Viborg – Århus (185 km) ===
#	Rider	Team	Nat.	Time
1	Ivan Basso	Team CSC	Italy	in 4h31'08"
2	Daniele Nardello	T-Mobile Team	Italy	s.t.
3	André Greipel	Team Wiesenhof	Germany	s.t.
4	Iljo Keisse	Chocolade Jacques–Topsport Vlaanderen	Belgium	s.t.
5	Martin Pedersen	Glud & Marstrand–Horsens	Denmark	s.t.
Full result

=== Stage 3: Århus – Vejle (185 km) ===
#	Rider	Team	Nat.	Time
1	Ivan Basso	Team CSC	Italy	in 4h44'15"
2	Rory Sutherland	Rabobank	Australia	at 1'09"
3	Moisés Aldape	Panaria Navigare	Mexico	s.t.
4	Kurt Asle Arvesen	Team CSC	Norway	at 1'10"
5	Daniele Nardello	T-Mobile Team	Italy	s.t.
Full result

=== Stage 4: Assens – Odense (90 km) ===
#	Rider	Team	Nat.	Time
1	Paride Grillo	Panaria Navigare	Italy	in 1h56'36"
2	Alexandre Usov	AG2R Prévoyance	Belarus	s.t.
3	Tomas Vaitkus	AG2R Prévoyance	Lithuania	s.t.
4	Martin Pedersen	Glud & Marstrand–Horsens	Denmark	s.t.
5	James Vanlandschoot	Landbouwkrediet–Colnago	Belgium	s.t.
Full result

=== Stage 5: Nyborg (13.8 km, ITT) ===
#	Rider	Team	Nat.	Time
1	Ivan Basso	Team CSC	Italy	in 16'15"
2	Jens Voigt	Team CSC	Germany	at 24"
3	Kurt Asle Arvesen	Team CSC	Norway	at 40"
4	Tomas Vaitkus	AG2R Prévoyance	Lithuania	at 43"
5	Łukasz Bodnar	Team Intel Action	Poland	at 51"
Full result

=== Stage 6: Slagelse – Frederiksberg (165 km) ===
#	Rider	Team	Nat.	Time
1	André Greipel	Team Wiesenhof	Germany	in 3h35'37"
2	Tomas Vaitkus	AG2R Prévoyance	Lithuania	s.t.
3	Paride Grillo	Panaria Navigare	Italy	s.t.
4	Graeme Brown	Panaria Navigare	Australia	s.t.
5	Marcin Lewandowski	Team Intel Action	Poland	s.t.
Full result

== Final classifications ==
=== Overall classement (yellow jersey) ===
#	Rider	Team	Nat.	Time
1	Ivan Basso	Team CSC	Italy	in 19h58'37"
2	Kurt Asle Arvesen	Team CSC	Norway	at 2'21"
3	Rory Sutherland	Rabobank	Australia	at 2'51"
4	Tomas Vaitkus	AG2R Prévoyance	Lithuania	at 2'55"
5	Daniele Nardello	T-Mobile Team	Italy	at 3'07"
6	Sergey Lagutin	Landbouwkrediet–Colnago	Uzbekistan	at 3'41"
7	Grischa Niermann	Rabobank	Germany	at 3'50"
8	Alexandr Kolobnev	Rabobank	Russia	at 3'56"
9	Roy Sentjens	Rabobank	Belgium	at 3'58"
10	André Greipel	Team Wiesenhof	Germany	at 4'05"
Full result

Ivan Basso's average speed for the race was 42.489 km/h.

=== Point classement (purple jersey) ===
#	Rider	Team	Nat.	Points
1	Ivan Basso	Team CSC	Italy	66 points
2	André Greipel	Team Wiesenhof	Germany	43 points
3	Kurt Asle Arvesen	Team CSC	Norway	39 points
4	Paride Grillo	Paniare Navigare	Italy	33 points
5	Tomas Vaitkus	AG2R Prévoyance	Lithuania	31 points
Full result

=== Hill classement (red-dotted jersey) ===
#	Rider	Team	Nat.	Points
1	Martin Müller	Team Wiesenhof	Germany	54 points
2	Martin Mortensen	Team Post Danmark	Denmark	36 points
3	Sergiy Matveyev	Paniare Navigare	Ukraine	28 points
4	Jens Voigt	Team CSC	Germany	24 points
5	Tom Stubbe	Chocolade Jacques–Topsport Vlaanderen	Belgium	20 points
Full result

=== Youth classement (white jersey) ===
#	Rider	Team	Nat.	Time
1	Rory Sutherland	Rabobank	Australia	20h01'28"
2	Tomas Vaitkus	AG2R Prévoyance	Lithuania	at 4"
3	Sergey Lagutin	Langbouwkrediet-Colnago	Uzbekistan	at 50"
4	Alexandr Kolobnev	Rabobank	Russia	at 1'05"
5	Roy Sentjens	Rabobank	Belgium	at 1'07"
Full result (without times)

=== Team classement ===
#	Team	Nat.	Time
1	Team CSC	Denmark	60h01'21"
2	Rabobank	Netherlands	at 4'48"
3	AG2R Prévoyance	France	at 7'32"
4	Landbouwkrediet–Colnago	Belgium	at 7'40"
5	Team Wiesenhof	Germany	at 7'59"
Full result

=== Fighter classement ===
#	Rider	Team	Nat.	Points
1	Allan Bo Andresen	Team Designa Køkken	Denmark	12 points
2	Martin Mortensen	Team Post Danmark	Denmark	12 points
3	Jens Voigt	Team CSC	Germany	10 points
4	Jacob Moe Rasmussen	Glud & Marstrand–Horsens	Denmark	10 points
5	Sergiy Matveyev	Panaria–Navigare	Ukraine	10 points
Full result
