= Kurt Asle Arvesen =

Norwegian road bicycle racer

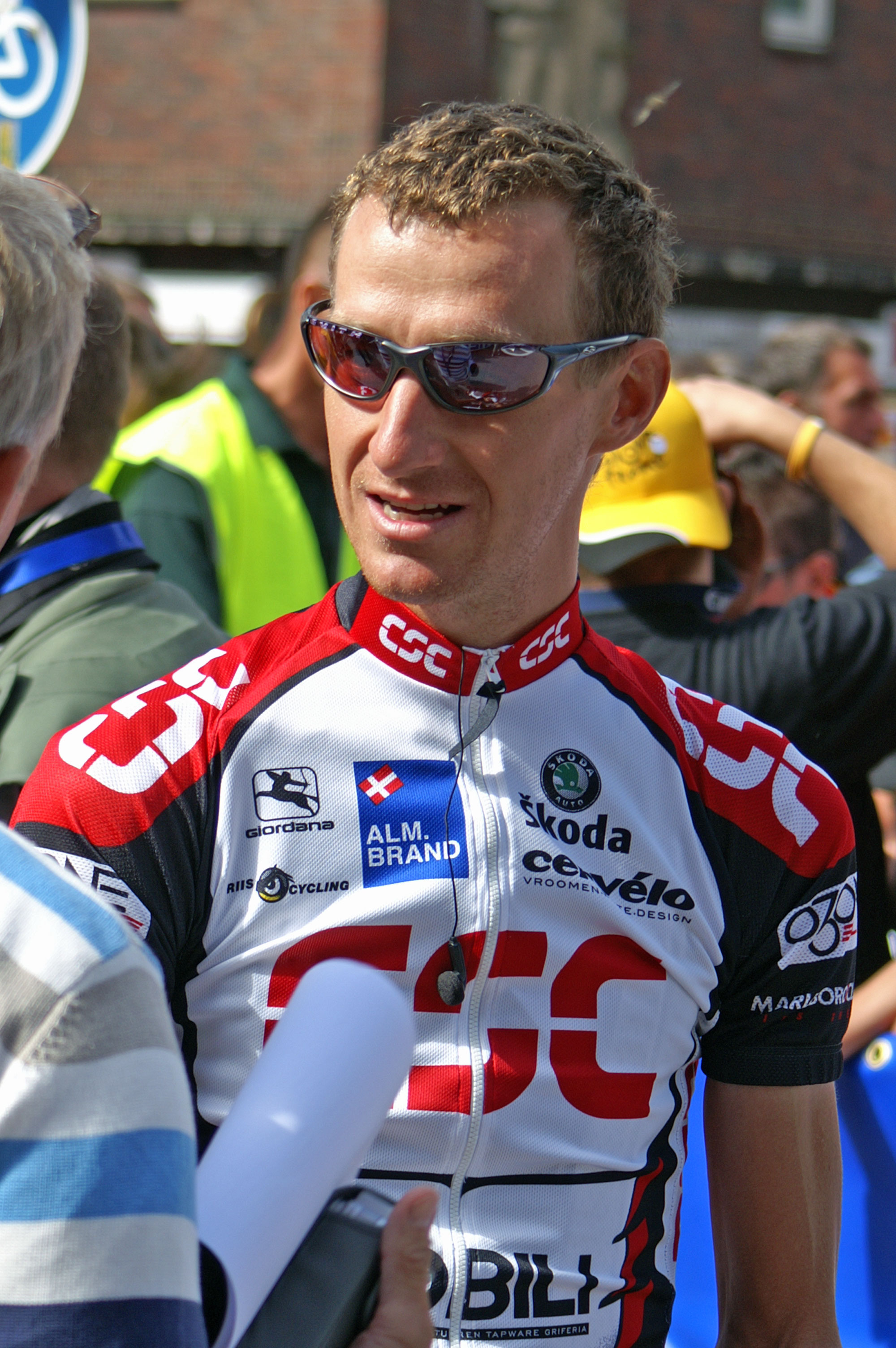
- Arvesen at the 2005 HEW Cyclassics

Personal information
- Full name: Kurt Asle Arvesen
- Born: 9 February 1975 (age 51) Molde, Norway
- Height: 1.83 m (6 ft 0 in)
- Weight: 70 kg (154 lb; 11 st 0 lb)

Cycling career
- Sport: Cycling
- Current team: Uno-X Mobility
- Discipline: Road
- Role: Rider (retired); Directeur sportif
- Rider type: Sprinter; Classics specialist

Professional teams
- 1998: Asics–CGA
- 1999–2000: Riso Scotti–Vinavil
- 2001–2003: Team Fakta
- 2004–2009: Team CSC
- 2010–2011: Team Sky

Managerial teams
- 2012–2016: Team Sky
- 2017–: Uno-X Hydrogen Development Team

Major wins
- Grand Tours Tour de France 1 individual stage (2008) Giro d'Italia 2 individual stages (2003, 2007) Vuelta a España 1 TTT stage (2006) Stage races Danmark Rundt (2004, 2007) Ster Elektrotoer (2006) One-day races and Classics National Road Race Championships (1997, 1998, 2002, 2008, 2009) National Time Trial Championships (2001, 2006) E3 Prijs Vlaanderen (2008)

Kurt Asle Arvesen (born 9 February 1975) is a Norwegian former professional road bicycle racer, who competed as a professional between 1998 and 2011. Arvesen is from Eresfjord, Nesset. He won the Norwegian National Road Race Championships five times, as well as stages in each of the three Grand Tours.

After retiring as a rider, Arvesen became a coach with Team Sky. He currently works as a directeur sportif for UCI ProTeam Uno-X Mobility.

== Career ==
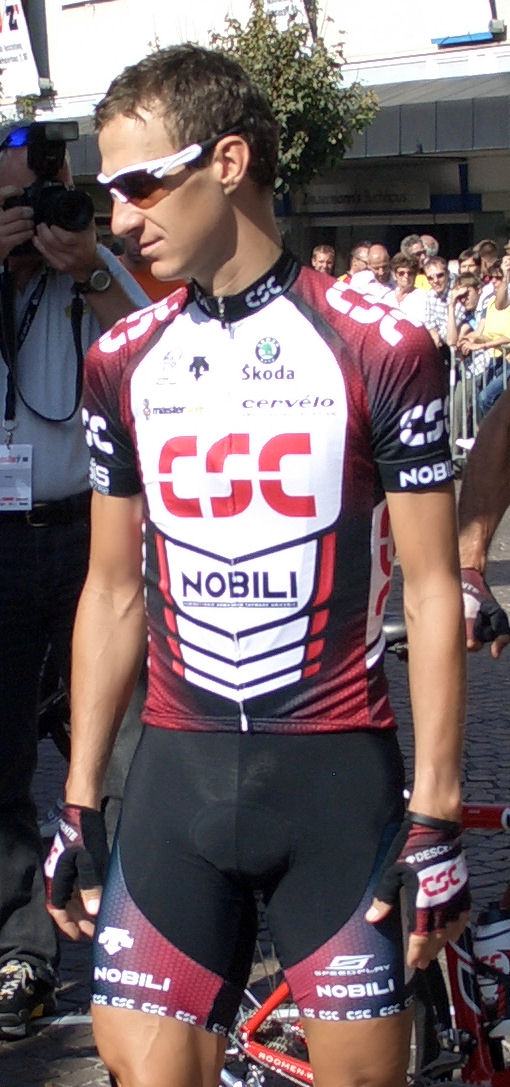
Kurt Asle Arvesen

After winning the gold medal at the 1997 Under-23 World Championship as an amateur, Arvesen turned pro with Italian team Asics in 1998, where later Team CSC teammate Ivan Basso rode as a stagiare. The two riders moved on to Davide Boifava's team, Riso Scotti-Vinavil in 1999, which was renamed Amica Chips-Tacconi Sport in 2000, but Arvesen's three years in Italy did not get him the results his World Under-23 Championships win had foretold. In 2001 Arvesen and Basso split up, as Arvesen moved on to Danish Team Fakta, where he experienced his most successful years culminating in a stage win in the 2003 Giro d'Italia.

In 2004, Team Fakta closed, and Arvesen and sports director Kim Andersen both moved on to Team CSC. At Team CSC, Arvesen has been riding mostly as a domestique, but he won the stage race Danmark Rundt as well as CSC Classic in 2004. For the 2004 Tour de France, Arvesen helped team captain Basso finish second overall, and he was named the toughest rider in the peloton when he finished the three-weeks long race after crashing severely on several stages.

For the 2005 Tour de France he would once more ride in support of Basso. This time Arvesen had the strength to ride aggressively, and on the 17th stage of the race, he got in a breakaway with 16 other riders which lasted all the way to the finish line. As the leading group slowly disintegrated, he and Italian rider Paolo Savoldelli were the last riders for the sprint, but Savoldelli was too fast for Arvesen.

In the 2006 UCI ProTour spring season Arvesen got a handful of top 10 placings. When he crashed into a right-swinging car during a training ride in April, he got away with road rash and a bruised right knee and less than a week later he rode Rund um den Henninger Turm, though he did not ride the race to its end. He finally won Ster Elektrotoer, but that was not sufficient to secure a place in the 2006 Tour de France roster. Arvesen became runner-up in Paris–Tours. In the 2007 Giro d'Italia Arvesen won stage 8 after beating Paolo Bettini in the finish. On 16 July he won stage 11 in the 2008 Tour de France, his first ever stage win in the tour. After engaging in a successful breakaway, he finished winning two centimeters ahead of number two.

Arversen's 2009 tour came to a disappointing end on Stage 10 just after passing Guéret. The Norwegian champion claimed his only stage victory in the Tour in Foix 12 months previously, however on Tuesday 14 July 2009 he crashed around the 88 km mark of the stage between Limoges and Issoudun.

After a week of rumours, it was official on 10 September 2009 that Arvesen would be joining Team Sky from the 2010-season, along with fellow Norwegians Edvald Boasson Hagen and Lars Petter Nordhaug. The start of the 2010 season with Team Sky was marred by injury for Arvesen. After winning the 1st stage of Tour of Qatar (TTT), Arvesen crashed on the following stage, breaking his collarbone. He returned to the bike in time to participate in Tirreno–Adriatico.

He ended his racing career after the 2011 season, but remained at Netcompany–Ineos as a specialist coach. He became a Sports Director with the team in 2015. In October 2016 it was announced that he would leave Sky and become sports director for the Norwegian UCI Continental squad Uno-X Hydrogen Development Team. In March 2017 it was also announced that he had agreed a permanent contract with Eurosport to act as an analyst for the channel, having appeared as a guest commentator with the station for several years.

== Major results ==
1997
1st Road race, UCI Road World Under-23 Championships
1st Road race, National Road Championships
1998
1st Road race, National Road Championships
2000
7th Circuito de Getxo
2001
1st Time trial, National Road Championships
1st Stage 9 Herald Sun Tour
3rd Scheldeprijs
2002
1st Road race, National Road Championships
1st Overall Tour of Sweden
1st Schynberg Rundfahrt
1st Mountains classification Paris–Corrèze
2nd Overall Danmark Rundt

1st Points classification
1st Stage 3

4th G.P. Costa degli Etruschi
7th Rund um den Henninger Turm
8th Overall Ronde van Nederland
2003
1st Stage 10 Giro d'Italia
4th GP Lugano
4th Cholet-Pays de la Loire
5th GP Ouest–France
5th Arnhem–Veenendaal Classic
7th Brabantse Pijl
2004
1st Overall Danmark Rundt
1st CSC Classic
3rd Overall Driedaagse van West-Vlaanderen
9th Overall Ster Elektrotoer
9th Road race, Olympic Games
2005
2nd Overall Danmark Rundt
4th Grand Prix de Wallonie
10th Overall Critérium International
2006
1st Time trial, National Road Championships
1st Overall Ster Elektrotoer
1st Stage 1 (TTT) Vuelta a España
2nd Paris–Tours
3rd Overall Tour de Wallonie
4th Overall Danmark Rundt
7th Brabantse Pijl
8th Dwars door Vlaanderen
10th Overall Tirreno–Adriatico
10th Gent–Wevelgem
10th Giro del Piemonte
2007
1st Overall Danmark Rundt

1st Stage 3

1st Stage 8 Giro d'Italia
1st GP Herning
2nd Rund um den Henninger Turm
3rd Overall Ster Elektrotoer
2008
1st Road race, National Road Championships
1st Stage 11 Tour de France
1st E3 Prijs Vlaanderen
1st Stenlille–Dianalund
7th Tour of Flanders
10th Milan–San Remo
2009
1st Road race, National Road Championships

=== Grand Tour general classification results timeline ===
Grand Tour	1999	2000	2001	2002	2003	2004	2005	2006	2007	2008	2009	2010	2011
Giro d'Italia	—	—	—	—	DNF	—	—	—	62	—	—	—	—
Tour de France	—	—	—	—	—	123	89	—	67	56	DNF	—	—
Vuelta a España	DNF	—	—	—	—	—	—	46	—	—	108	—	DNF

Legend
—	Did not compete
DNF	Did not finish
