= 2004 Danmark Rundt =

Race details
- Dates: 4–8 August 2004
- Stages: 6
- Distance: 851.7 km (529.2 mi)
- Winning time: 19h 49' 14"

Results
Jersey awarded to the overall winner	Winner	Kurt Asle Arvesen (NOR)	(Team CSC)
	Second	Jens Voigt (GER)	(Team CSC)
	Third	Stuart O'Grady (AUS)	(Cofidis)
Jersey awarded to the points classification winner	Points	Stuart O'Grady (AUS)	(Cofidis)
Jersey awarded to the mountains classification winner	Mountains	Jacob Moe Rasmussen (DEN)	(Team PH)
Jersey awarded to the youth classification winner	Youth	Brian Vandborg (DEN)	(Team Post Danmark)
	Team	(Denmark) Team CSC	

The 2004 Danmark Rundt was held from 4–8 August 2004. It was the 14th edition of the men's stage race, which was established in 1985.

== Stages ==
=== Stage 1: Aabenraa – Esbjerg (150 km) ===
#	Rider	Team	Nat.	Time
1	Stuart O'Grady	Cofidis	Australia	in 3h19'35"
2	Michel van Haecke	MrBookmaker.com–Palmans	Belgium	s.t.
3	André Korff	T-Mobile Team	Germany	s.t.
4	Fabrizio Guidi	Team CSC	Italy	s.t.
5	Roy Sentjens	Rabobank	Netherlands	s.t.
Full result

=== Stage 2: Varde – Århus (185 km) ===
#	Rider	Team	Nat.	Time
1	Fabrizio Guidi	Team CSC	Italy	in 5h03'45"
2	Tom Steels	Landbouwkrediet–Colnago	Belgium	s.t.
3	Stefan van Dijk	Lotto–Domo	Netherlands	s.t.
4	Giosuè Bonomi	Saeco	Belgium	s.t.
5	Stuart O'Grady	Cofidis	Australia	s.t.
Full result

=== Stage 3: Århus – Vejle (115 km) ===
#	Rider	Team	Nat.	Time
1	Janek Tombak	Cofidis	Estonia	in 2h44'35"
2	Kurt Asle Arvesen	Team CSC	Norway	s.t.
3	Jens Voigt	Team CSC	Germany	s.t.
4	Stuart O'Grady	Cofidis	Australia	at 19"
5	Lars Bak	Bankgiroloterij	Denmark	s.t.
Full result

=== Stage 4: Fredericia, (11.7 km, ITT) ===
#	Rider	Team	Nat.	Time
1	Jens Voigt	Team CSC	Germany	in 14'06"
2	Kurt Asle Arvesen	Team CSC	Norway	at 5"
3	Víctor Hugo Peña	U.S. Postal Service	Colombia	at 6"
4	Brian Vandborg	Team Post Danmark	Denmark	at 15"
5	Michael Blaudzun	Team CSC	Denmark	at 19"
Full result

=== Stage 5: Odense – Roskilde (195 km) ===
#	Rider	Team	Nat.	Time
1	Tomas Vaitkus	Landbouwkrediet–Colnago	Lithuania	in 5h01'14"
2	Stuart O'Grady	Cofidis	Australia	s.t.
3	André Korff	T-Mobile Team	Germany	s.t.
4	Fabrizio Guidi	Team CSC	Italy	s.t.
5	Jeremy Hunt	MrBookmaker.com–Palmans	England	s.t.
Full result

=== Stage 6: Taastrup – Frederiksberg (195 km) ===
#	Rider	Team	Nat.	Time
1	Jimmy Casper	Cofidis	France	in 4h34'50"
2	Tomas Vaitkus	Landbouwkrediet–Colnago	Lithuania	s.t.
3	Stuart O'Grady	Cofidis	Australia	s.t.
4	Giosuè Bonomi	Saeco	Italy	s.t.
5	Jeremy Hunt	MrBookmaker.com–Palmans	England	s.t.
Full result

== Final classifications ==
=== Overall classement (yellow jersey) ===
#	Rider	Team	Nat.	Time
1	Kurt Asle Arvesen	Team CSC	Norway	in 20h58'01"
2	Jens Voigt	Team CSC	Germany	at 2"
3	Stuart O'Grady	Cofidis	Australia	at 49"
4	Brian Vandborg	Team Post Danmark	Denmark	at 59"
5	Max van Heeswijk	US Postal	Netherlands	at 1'07"
6	Michael Barry	US Postal	Canada	at 1'08"
7	Joost Posthuma	Rabobank	Netherlands	at 1'14"
8	Ellis Rastelli	Alessio–Bianchi	Italy	at 1'35"
9	Lars Bak	Bankgiroloterij	Denmark	at 1'37"
10	Víctor Hugo Peña	US Postal	Colombia	at 1'45"
Full result

Kurt Asle Arvesen's average speed for the race was 40.621 km/h.

=== Point classement (purple jersey) ===
#	Rider	Team	Nat.	Points
1	Stuart O'Grady	Cofidis	Australia	55 points
2	Fabrizio Guidi	Team CSC	Italy	41 points
3	Kurt Asle Arvesen	Team CSC	Norway	37 points
4	Tomas Vaitkus	AG2R Prévoyance	Lithuania	34 points
5	Giosuè Bonomi	Saeco	Italy	31 points
Full result

=== Hill classement (red-dotted jersey) ===
#	Rider	Team	Nat.	Points
1	Jacob Moe Rasmussen	Team PH	Denmark	40 points
2	Jacob Nielsen	Glud & Marstrand–Horsens	Denmark	36 points
3	Jens Voigt	Team CSC	Germany	32 points
4	Glenn Bak	Team Post Danmark	Denmark	22 points
5	Jimmy Engoulvent	Cofidis	France	20 points
Full result

=== Youth classement (white jersey) ===
#	Rider	Team	Nat.	Time
1	Brian Vandborg	Team Post Danmark	Denmark	20h59'00"
2	Joost Posthuma	Rabobank	Netherlands	at 15"
3	Lars Bak	Bankgiroloterij	Denmark	at 38"
4	Julien Laidoun	AG2R Prévoyance	France	at 59"
5	Tomas Vaitkus	Landbouwkrediet–Colnago	Lithuania	at 1'14"
Full result (without times)

=== Team classement ===
#	Team	Nat.	Time
1	Team CSC	Denmark	62h55'42"
2	U.S. Postal Service	Netherlands	at 4'48"
3	AG2R Prévoyance	France	at 7'32"
4	Landbouwkrediet–Colnago	Belgium	at 7'40"
5	Team Wiesenhof	Germany	at 7'59"
Full result

=== Fighter classement ===
#	Rider	Team	Nat.	Points
1	Jacob Nielsen	Glud & Marstrand–Horsens	Denmark	10 points
2	Lars Høg Thomsen	Team Post Danmark	Denmark	10 points
3	Kasper Klostergaard	Team Post Danmark	Denmark	10 points
4	Jens Voigt	Team CSC	Germany	10 points
5	Angelo Furlan	Alessio–Bianchi	Italy	10 points
Full result

The order was decided by the same jury that gives the points throughout the race.
