= Danmark Rundt =

Road cycling race in Denmark

Race details
- Date: August
- Region: Denmark
- English name: Tour of Denmark
- Local name: Danmark Rundt (in Danish)
- Discipline: Road
- Competition: UCI ProSeries
- Type: Stage race
- Organiser: Danish Cycling Federation
- Race director: Jesper Worre
- Web site: postnorddanmarkrundt.dk

History
- First edition: 1985
- Editions: 35 (as of 2026)
- First winner: Moreno Argentin (ITA)
- Most wins: Jakob Fuglsang (DEN); Mads Pedersen (DEN) (3 wins each)
- Most recent: Wout van Aert (BEL)

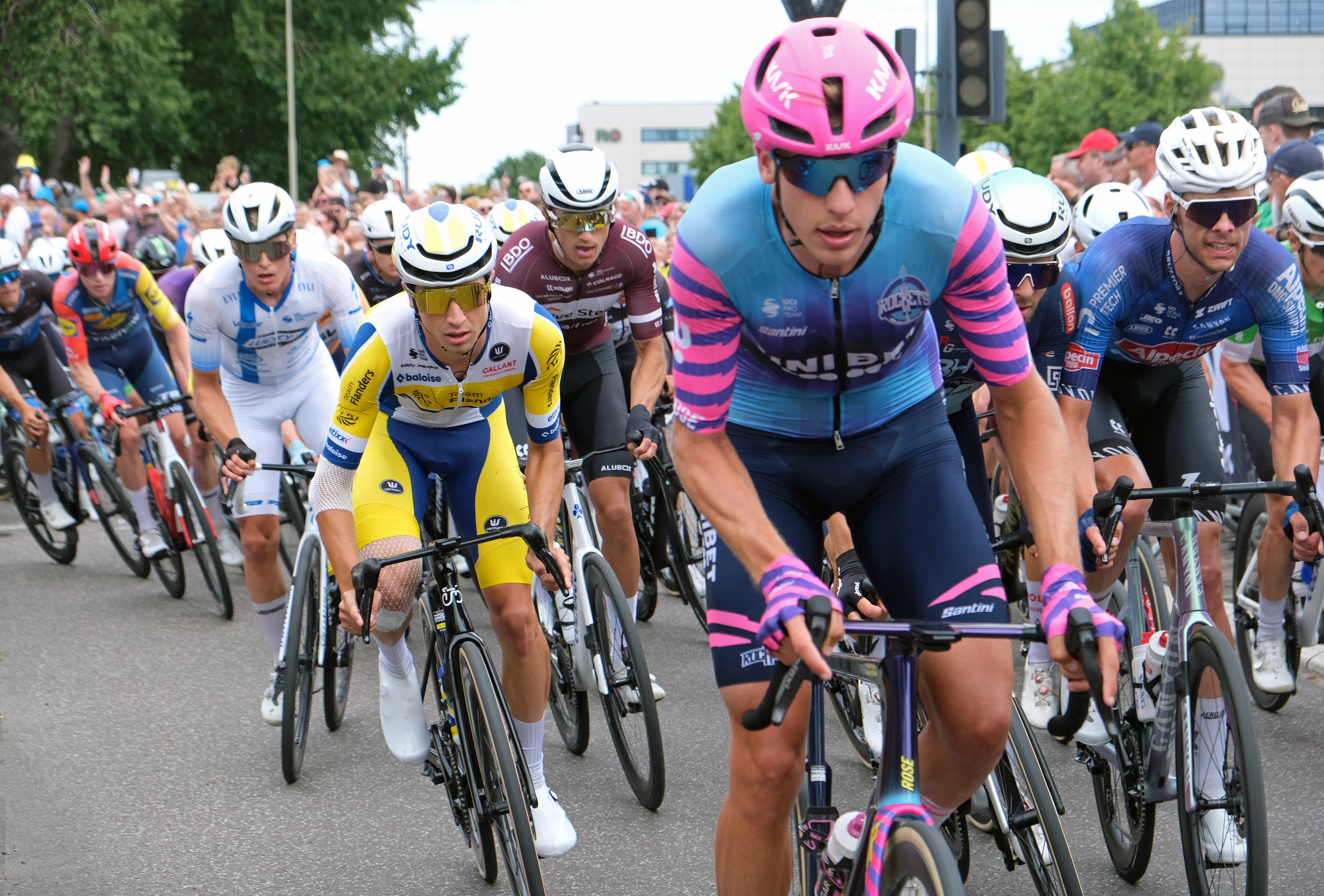
2026 Post Danmark Rundt, peloton on final stage in Rødovre

Danmark Rundt is a Danish multi-day professional road cycling race. It is currently sponsored by the Danish national postal agency, PostNord, and the race is therefore also known as PostNord Danmark Rundt. The race is sometimes called the Tour of Denmark in English language media. The race has been on the UCI ProSeries calendar since 2021, after being cancelled in 2020.

== Course ==
Traditionally, the race starts off on the Jutland peninsula and ends on the island of Zealand – on Frederiksberg Allé in Copenhagen. Since 2004, one of the stages has included the steep street Kiddesvej in the city of Vejle. It's this hilly stage and the time trial that usually determine who will win the general classification.

== History ==
The race was first run yearly from 1985 to 1988 and, after a break of 7 years, from 1995 onwards. It attracts approximately half a million spectators on the road.

After no less than five second places overall, including twice before the race hiatus of 1989–1994, Rolf Sørensen finally secured overall victory in his home race in 2000.

In 2004 it was won by Kurt Asle Arvesen, after his Team CSC teammate Jens Voigt let him win an intermediate sprint, so Arvesen finished 2 seconds ahead in the overall classification. In 2005 Ivan Basso of Team CSC, coming off the 2005 Tour de France as the overall runner-up, totally dominated the race, and won overall as well as 4 out of 6 stages. Since the race was run at the same time as the UCI ProTour race Eneco Tour, only three UCI ProTour teams participated.

In 2006, the race was won by Fabian Cancellara of CSC ahead of Stuart O'Grady, also of CSC and in 2007 Kurt Asle Arvesen returned to win for the second time, being the first in history to do so, and giving Team CSC its 4th consecutive win. In 2008 Jakob Fuglsang from Team Designa Køkken became the first Dane to win since 2002. In 2009 he became the first rider to win the race two years in a row before going on to win for a third consecutive year in 2010. Fuglsang was succeeded by Australian rider Simon Gerrans in 2011, Lieuwe Westra in 2012 and Wilco Kelderman in 2013.

The 2014 Danmark Rundt was won by Danish rider Michael Valgren of the Tinkoff–Saxo team. The 2015 edition was planned to start on 4 August 2014, with the first stage scheduled to begin in Struer and end in Holstebro. It ended on 8 August. The 2015 Danmark Rundt was won by Danish rider Christopher Juul-Jensen of the Tinkoff–Saxo team.

== Winners by year ==
=== Podium positions ===
Year	Winner	Runner-up		Third	
1985	Moreno Argentin (ITA), Sammontana–Bianchi	Kim Andersen (DEN), La Vie Claire	21"	Etienne De Wilde (BEL), Safir–Van de Ven	58"
1986	Jesper Worre (DEN), Selca–Conti–Galli	Jørgen V. Pedersen (DEN), Carrera–Inoxpran	4"	Jelle Nijdam (NED), Kwantum–Decosol–Yoko	13"
1987	Kim Andersen (DEN), Toshiba	Rolf Sørensen (DEN), Pepsi–Fanini	6"	Søren Lilholt (DEN), Danmark-Bikuben	24"
1988	Phil Anderson (AUS), TVM	Rolf Sørensen (DEN), Ceramiche Ariostea	5"	Søren Lilholt (DEN), Sigma	47"
1989–1994: No competition
1995	Bjarne Riis (DEN), Gewiss–Ballan	Bo Hamburger (DEN), TVM	1'02"	Kaspars Ozers (LAT), Motorola	2'05"
1996	Fabrizio Guidi (ITA), Scrigno	Rolf Sørensen (DEN), Rabobank	12"	Bjarne Riis (DEN), Team Telekom	1'02"
1997	Servais Knaven (NED), TVM	Peter Meinert (DEN), U.S. Postal Service	10"	Jesper Skibby (DEN), TVM	24"
1998	Marc Streel (BEL), Casino–Ag2r	Rolf Sørensen (DEN), Rabobank	54"	Peter Meinert (DEN), U.S. Postal Service	1'19"
1999	Tyler Hamilton (USA), U.S. Postal Service	Rolf Sørensen (DEN), Rabobank	18"	Martin Hvastija (SLO), Ballan-Alessio	45"
2000	Rolf Sørensen (DEN), Rabobank	Andreas Klöden (GER), Team Telekom	30"	Stéphane Barthe (FRA), AG2R Prévoyance	44"
2001	David Millar (GBR), Cofidis	Jaan Kirsipuu (EST), AG2R Prévoyance	7"	Daniele Nardello (ITA), Mapei–Quick-Step	18"
2002	Jakob Piil (DEN), CSC–Tiscali	Kurt Asle Arvesen (NOR), Team Fakta	1'12"	László Bodrogi (HUN), Mapei–Quick-Step	1'45"
2003	Sebastian Lang (GER), Gerolsteiner	Jurgen Van Goolen (BEL), Quick-Step–Davitamon	2"	Laurent Brochard (FRA), AG2R Prévoyance	19"
2004	Kurt Asle Arvesen (NOR), Team CSC	Jens Voigt (GER), Team CSC	2"	Stuart O'Grady (AUS), Cofidis	49"
2005	Ivan Basso (ITA), Team CSC	Kurt Asle Arvesen (NOR), Team CSC	2'21"	Rory Sutherland (AUS), Rabobank	2'51"
2006	Fabian Cancellara (SUI), Team CSC	Stuart O'Grady (AUS), Team CSC	20"	Thomas Ziegler (GER), T-Mobile Team	53"
2007	Kurt Asle Arvesen (NOR), Team CSC	Enrico Gasparotto (ITA), Liquigas	14"	Matti Breschel (DEN), Team CSC	27"
2008	Jakob Fuglsang (DEN), Team Designa Køkken	Steve Cummings (GBR), Barloworld	9"	Tom Stamsnijder (NED), Gerolsteiner	15"
2009	Jakob Fuglsang (DEN), Team Saxo Bank	Maurizio Biondo (ITA), Ceramica Flaminia	3"	Roger Hammond (GBR), Cervélo TestTeam	47"
2010	Jakob Fuglsang (DEN), Team Saxo Bank	Svein Tuft (CAN), Garmin–Transitions	27"	Matthew Busche (USA), Team RadioShack	1'35"
2011	Simon Gerrans (AUS), Team Sky	Daniele Bennati (ITA), Leopard Trek	9"	Michael Mørkøv (DEN), Saxo Bank–SunGard	29"
2012	Lieuwe Westra (NED), Vacansoleil–DCM	Ramūnas Navardauskas (LTU), Garmin–Sharp	10"	Manuele Boaro (ITA), Saxo Bank–Tinkoff Bank	14"
2013	Wilco Kelderman (NED), Belkin Pro Cycling	Lars Bak (DEN), Lotto–Belisol	6"	Matti Breschel (DEN), Saxo–Tinkoff	15"
2014	Michael Valgren (DEN), Tinkoff–Saxo	Lars Bak (DEN), Lotto–Belisol	15"	Manuele Boaro (ITA), Tinkoff–Saxo	17"
2015	Christopher Juul-Jensen (DEN), Tinkoff–Saxo	Lars Bak (DEN), Lotto–Soudal	45"	Marco Marcato (ITA), Wanty–Groupe Gobert	49"
2016	Michael Valgren (DEN), Tinkoff	Magnus Cort (DEN), Denmark	10"	Mads Würtz Schmidt (DEN), Team Virtu Pro–Véloconcept	57"
2017	Mads Pedersen (DEN), Trek–Segafredo	Michael Valgren (DEN), Astana	15"	Casper Pedersen (DEN), Team Giant–Castelli	46"
2018	Wout van Aert (BEL), Vérandas Willems–Crelan	Rasmus Quaade (DEN), BHS–Almeborg Bornholm	32"	Lasse Norman Hansen (DEN), Aqua Blue Sport	36"
2019	Niklas Larsen (DEN), Team ColoQuick	Jonas Vingegaard (DEN), Team Jumbo–Visma	11"	Rasmus Quaade (DEN), Riwal Readynez	12"
2020	Cancelled due to the COVID-19 pandemic				
2021	Remco Evenepoel (BEL), Deceuninck–Quick-Step	Mads Pedersen (DEN), Trek–Segafredo	1' 42"	Mike Teunissen (NED), Team Jumbo–Visma	2' 00"
2022	Christophe Laporte (FRA), Team Jumbo–Visma	Magnus Sheffield (USA), INEOS Grenadiers	4"	Mattias Skjelmose Jensen (DEN), Trek–Segafredo	9"
2023	Mads Pedersen (DEN), Lidl–Trek	Mattias Skjelmose (DEN), Lidl–Trek	41"	Magnus Cort (DEN), EF Education–EasyPost	+ 1' 19"
2024	Arnaud De Lie (BEL), Lotto–Dstny	Magnus Cort (DEN), Uno-X Mobility	1"	Anders Foldager (DEN), Team PostNord Landsholdet	27"
2025	Mads Pedersen (DEN), Lidl–Trek	Jakob Söderqvist (SWE), Lidl–Trek Future Racing	1'28"	Niklas Larsen (DEN), BHS–PL Beton Bornholm	1'30"
2026	Wout van Aert (BEL), Visma–Lease a Bike	Lukáš Kubiš (SVK), Unibet Rose Rockets	21"	Henrik Pedersen (DEN), Uno-X Mobility	28"

=== Secondary classifications ===
Various secondary competitions have been held over the years.

Year	Classifications			
Year	Points	Mountains	Youth*	Team
1985	Jørgen V. Pedersen (DEN), Carrera–Inoxpran	No such competition	Francesco Rossignoli (ITA), Carrera–Inoxpran	Carrera–Inoxpran
1986	Rolf Sørensen (DEN), Murella Fanini	Johan Capiot (BEL), Roland	Jelle Nijdam (NED), Kwantum–Decosol–Yoko	Danmark-Bikuben
1987	Søren Lilholt (DEN), Danmark-Bikuben	Peter Harings (NED), Panasonic–Isostar	Rolf Sørensen (DEN), Pepsi–Fanini	Danmark-Bikuben
1988	Rolf Sørensen (DEN), Ceramiche Ariostea	Jan van Wijk (NED), Panasonic–Isostar–Colnago–Agu	Rolf Sørensen (DEN), Pepsi–Fanini	Roland–Colnago
1989–1994: No competition
1995	Bo Hamburger (DEN), TVM	No such competition	No such competition	TVM
1996	Fabrizio Guidi (ITA), Scrigno	No such competition	No such competition	Team Telekom
1997	Juris Silovs (LAT), Schauff Öschelbronn	No such competition	No such competition	U.S. Postal Service
1998	Alberto Ongarato (ITA), Ballan	Paolo Bettini (ITA), ASICS	No such competition	U.S. Postal Service
1999	Nicola Loda (ITA), Ballan	Alessandro Petacchi (ITA), Navigare	No such competition	U.S. Postal Service
2000	Marco Zanotti (ITA), Liquigas–Pata	Luca Paolini (ITA), Mapei–Quick-Step	Andreas Klöden (GER), Team Telekom	Team Farm Frites
2001	Jaan Kirsipuu (EST), AG2R Prévoyance	Paolo Valoti (ITA), Alessio	David Millar (GBR), Cofidis	CSC–Tiscali
2002	Olaf Pollack (GER), Gerolsteiner	Innar Mändoja (EST), AG2R Prévoyance	Stefan Adamsson (SWE), Team Coast	Gerolsteiner
2003	Yuriy Metlushenko (UKR), Landbouwkrediet–Colnago	Daniele Contrini (ITA), Gerolsteiner	Sebastian Lang (GER), Gerolsteiner	Team Fakta
2004	Stuart O'Grady (AUS), Cofidis	Jacob Moe Rasmussen (DEN), Team PH	Brian Vandborg (DEN), Team Danmark	Team CSC
2005	Ivan Basso (ITA), Team CSC	Martin Müller (GER), Wiesenhof	André Greipel (GER), Wiesenhof	Team CSC
2006	Stuart O'Grady (AUS), Team CSC	Aart Vierhouten (NED), Skil–Shimano	Fabian Cancellara (SUI), Team CSC	Team CSC
2007	Mark Cavendish (GBR), T-Mobile Team	Jacob Moe Rasmussen (DEN), Team GLS	Enrico Gasparotto (ITA), Liquigas	Team CSC
2008	Matti Breschel (DEN), CSC–Saxo Bank	Kristoffer Gudmund Nielsen (DEN), Team GLS-Pakkeshop	Jakob Fuglsang (DEN), Team Designa Køkken	CSC–Saxo Bank
2009	Matti Breschel (DEN), Team Saxo Bank	Troels Vinther (DEN), Team Capinordic	Rasmus Guldhammer (DEN), Team Capinordic	Team Saxo Bank
2010	Matti Breschel (DEN), Team Saxo Bank	Michael Reihs (DEN), Team Designa Køkken–Blue Water	Rasmus Guldhammer (DEN), Team HTC–Columbia	Team Saxo Bank
2011	Sacha Modolo (ITA), Colnago–CSF Inox	Michael Reihs (DEN), Christina Watches–Onfone	Jérôme Cousin (FRA), Team Europcar	Team Sky
2012	Alexander Kristoff (NOR), Team Katusha	Nikola Aistrup (DEN), Forsikring–Himmerland	Wilco Kelderman (NED), Rabobank	Team Sky
2013	Wilco Kelderman (NED), Belkin Pro Cycling	Martin Mortensen (DEN), Concordia Forsikring–Riwal	Wilco Kelderman (NED), Belkin Pro Cycling	Bardiani Valvole–CSF Inox
2014	Alexey Lutsenko (KAZ), Astana	John Murphy (USA), UnitedHealthcare	Michael Valgren (DEN), Tinkoff–Saxo	Tinkoff–Saxo
2015	Matti Breschel (DEN), Tinkoff–Saxo	Pim Ligthart (NED), Lotto–Soudal	Mads Würtz Schmidt (DEN), Team ColoQuick	Tinkoff–Saxo
2016	Daniele Bennati (ITA), Tinkoff	Aimé De Gendt (BEL), Topsport Vlaanderen–Baloise	Mads Würtz Schmidt (DEN), Team Virtu Pro–Véloconcept	Tinkoff
2017	Mads Pedersen (DEN), Trek–Segafredo	Nicolai Brøchner (DEN), Riwal Platform	Mads Pedersen (DEN), Trek–Segafredo	Team Virtu Cycling
2018	Tim Merlier (BEL), Vérandas Willems–Crelan	Nicolai Brøchner (DEN), Holowesko Citadel p/b Arapahoe Resources	Julius Johansen (DEN), Team ColoQuick	BHS–Almeborg Bornholm
2019	Jasper De Buyst (BEL), Lotto–Soudal	Fridtjof Røinås (NOR), Joker Fuel of Norway	Niklas Larsen (DEN), Team ColoQuick	Lotto–Soudal
2020	Cancelled due to the COVID-19 pandemic			
2021	Mads Pedersen (DEN), Trek–Segafredo	Rasmus Bøgh Wallin (DEN), Team PostNord Danmark	Remco Evenepoel (BEL), Deceuninck–Quick-Step	Trek–Segafredo
2022	Christophe Laporte (FRA), Team Jumbo–Visma	Rasmus Bøgh Wallin (DEN), Restaurant Suri–Carl Ras	Magnus Sheffield (USA), INEOS Grenadiers	Trek–Segafredo
2023	Mads Pedersen (DEN), Lidl–Trek	Nicklas Amdi Pedersen (DEN), Team ColoQuick	Logan Currie (NZL), Bolton Equities Black Spoke	Lidl–Trek
2024	Tobias Lund Andresen (DEN), Team dsm–firmenich PostNL	Kristian Egholm (DEN), Lidl–Trek Future Racing	Arnaud De Lie (BEL), Lotto–Dstny	Team dsm–firmenich PostNL
2025	Mads Pedersen (DEN), Lidl–Trek	Marius Innhaug Dahl (NOR), Decathlon–AG2R La Mondiale Development Team	Jakob Söderqvist (SWE), Lidl–Trek Future Racing	Lidl–Trek
2026	Wout van Aert (BEL), Visma–Lease a Bike	Aksel Bech Skot-Hansen (DEN), Team Give Steel	Henrik Pedersen (DEN), Uno-X Mobility	Unibet Rose Rockets

*In 1985, 1986 and 1987 the competition was for riders under 23 years, in 1988 the bar was raised to 24 years, and in 2000 and later editions, it has been for riders born in or after (race year) – 25 years (i.e. in 2000 they had to be born in or after 1975).

=== Other classifications ===
In addition to the five competitions above, in all editions except the 1985 and 1995 ones, a fighter competition was held.

==== Former classifications ====
- Until 2000, a sprint competition was held.
- In 1987 and 1988 a "Best Dane" competition was held.
- In 1995, a "Best Amateur" competition was held.

== Winners by nation ==
A complete list over overall winners by nation of the Post Danmark Rundt.

Rank	Country	Most times winner	Most recent winner	Wins
1	Denmark	Jakob Fuglsang, Mads Pedersen (3 each)	Mads Pedersen (2025)	15
2	Belgium	Wout van Aert (2)	Wout van Aert (2026)	5
3	Italy	Moreno Argentin, Fabrizio Guidi, Ivan Basso (1 each)	Ivan Basso (2005)	3
3	Netherlands	Wilco Kelderman, Servais Knaven, Lieuwe Westra (1 each)	Wilco Kelderman (2013)	3
5	Norway	Kurt Asle Arvesen (2)	Kurt Asle Arvesen (2007)	2
5	Australia	Phil Anderson, Simon Gerrans (1 each)	Simon Gerrans (2011)	2
7	United States	Tyler Hamilton (1)	Tyler Hamilton (1999)	1
7	United Kingdom	David Millar (1)	David Millar (2001)	1
7	Germany	Sebastian Lang (1 )	Sebastian Lang (2003)	1
7	Switzerland	Fabian Cancellara (1)	Fabian Cancellara (2006)	1
7	France	Christophe Laporte (1)	Christophe Laporte (2022)	1

== Most stage wins ==
A list of the riders with the most stage wins in the Post Danmark Rundt.

#	Rider	Stage wins
1	Matti Breschel (DEN)	9
2	Mads Pedersen (DEN)	7
3	Jesper Skibby (DEN)	5
3	Nicola Minali (ITA)	5
3	Magnus Cort (DEN)	5
6	Ivan Basso (ITA)	4
6	Wout van Aert (BEL)	4
7	Jean-Paul van Poppel (NED)	3
7	Rolf Sørensen (DEN)	3
7	Jaan Kirsipuu (EST)	3
7	Mark Cavendish (GBR)	3

== Classifications ==
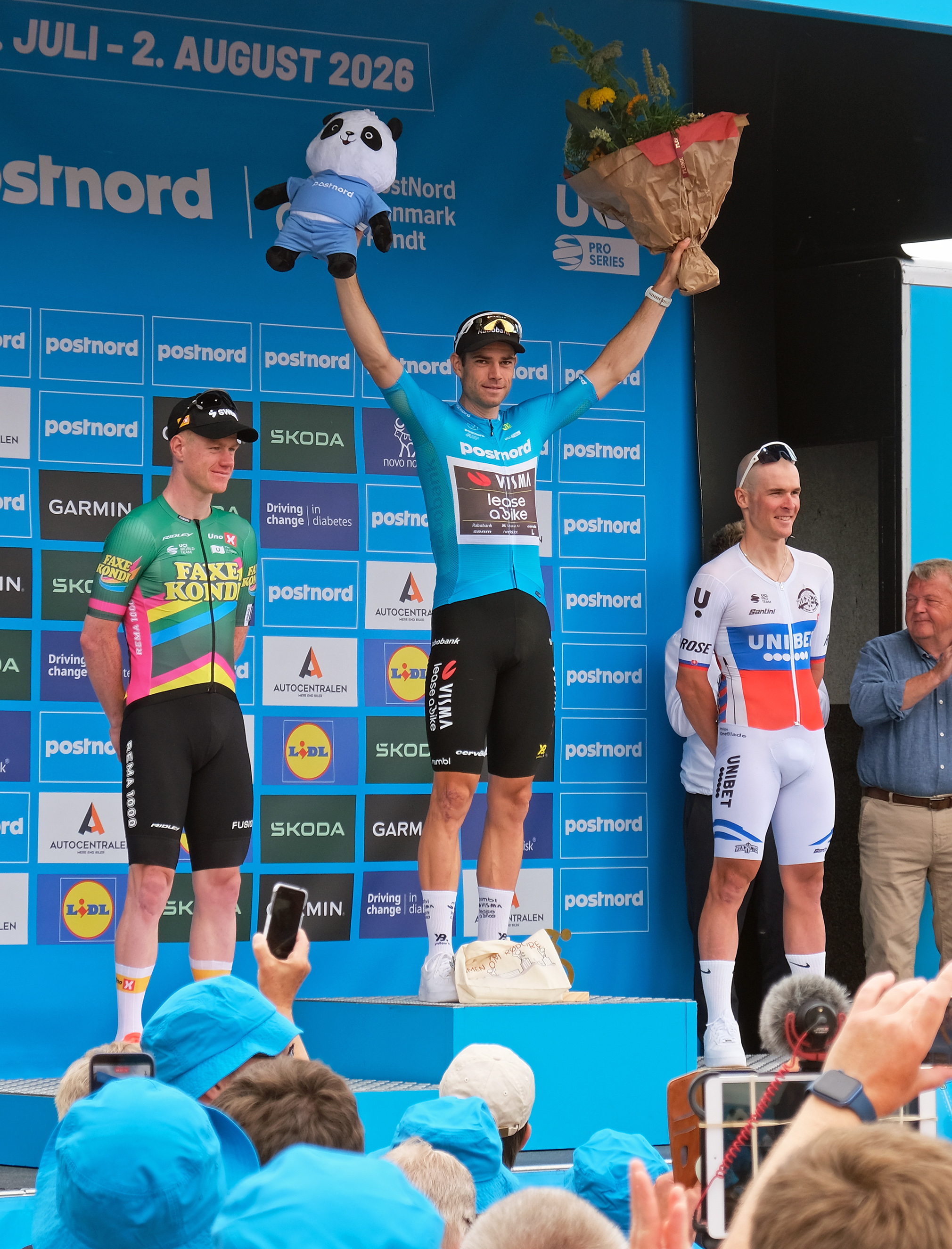
2026 winner Wout van Aert on the Blue Jersey

As of the 2018 edition, the jerseys worn by the leaders of the individual classifications are:

- Blue Jersey – Worn by the leader of the general classification.
- Green Jersey – Worn by the leader of the points classification.
- Polkadot Jersey – Worn by the leader of the climber classification.
- White Jersey – Worn by the best rider under 23 years of age on the overall classification.
