= 2008 Danmark Rundt =

2007–2008 UCI Europe Tour

Race details
- Dates: 30 July – 3 August 2008
- Stages: 6
- Distance: 889.5 km (552.7 mi)
- Winning time: 20h 42' 40"

Results
Jersey awarded to the overall winner	Winner	Jakob Fuglsang (Denmark)
	Second	Steve Cummings (Great Britain)
	Third	Tom Stamsnijder (Netherlands)
Jersey awarded to the points classification winner	Points	Matti Breschel (Denmark)
Jersey awarded to the mountains classification winner	Mountains	Kristoffer Nielsen (Denmark)
Jersey awarded to the young rider classification winner	Young rider	Jakob Fuglsang (Denmark)
	Team	(Denmark) CSC

The 2008 Danmark Rundt was a men's road bicycle race held from 30 July to 3 August 2008. It was the 18th edition of the men's stage race, which was established in 1985. The race was won by Danish rider Jakob Fuglsang of Team Saxo Bank. Steve Cummings of Barloworld finished second by nine seconds with Tom Stamsnijder of Team Gerolsteiner third.

== Schedule ==
Stage	Route	Distance	Date	Winner
1	Holstebro > Holstebro	170 km	30 July	(Argentina) Guillermo Bongiorno
2	Skjern > Sønderborg	220 km	31 July	(Denmark) Matti Breschel
3	Padborg > Vejle	200 km	1 August	(Denmark) Matti Breschel
4	Ringe > Odense	115 km	2 August	(Argentina) Guillermo Bongiorno
5 (ITT)	Kerteminde > Kerterminde	14.5 km	2 August	(Sweden) Gustav Larsson
6	Slagelse > Frederiksberg	165 km	3 August	(Argentina) Juan José Haedo

== Teams ==
Fifteen teams took part in the 2008 race.

== Final classifications ==
Danish rider Jakob Fuglsang won the race by nine seconds from Steve Cummings. Tom Stamsnijder was placed third.

The points winner was Matti Breschel with Kristoffer Gudmund Nielsen the winner of the mountains classification for best climber. Fuglsang also won the white jersey for the best young rider award and Martin Mortensen was awarded the fighters award for the race. Team CSC Saxo Bank won the overall team competition from Team Columbia with Team Gerolsteiner in third place.
