= Ivan Basso =

Italian cyclist

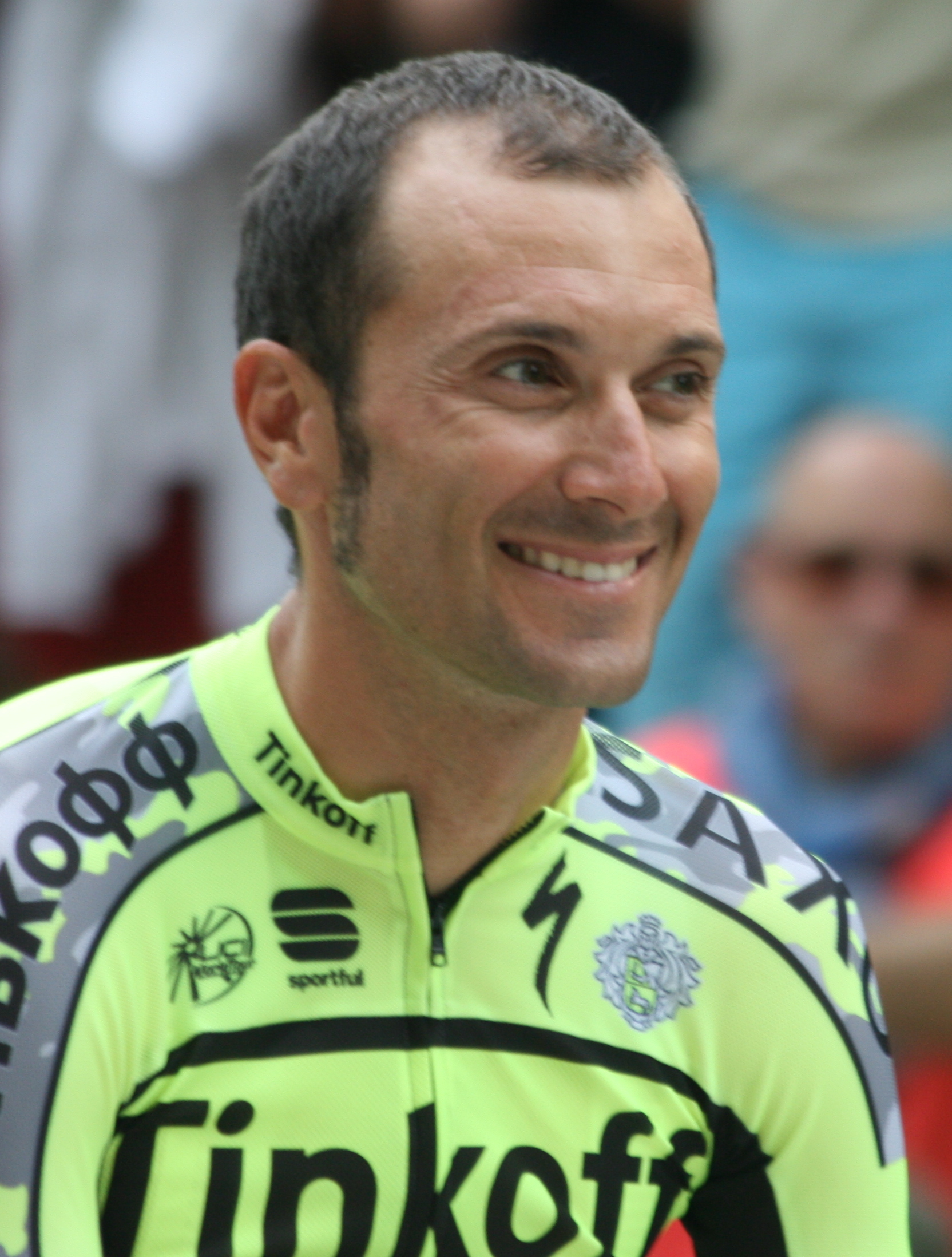
- Basso at the 2015 Tour de France

Personal information
- Full name: Ivan Basso
- Nicknames: Ivan the Terrible, The Smiling Assassin
- Born: 26 November 1977 (age 48) Gallarate, Province of Varese, Italy
- Height: 1.82 m (5 ft 11 1/2 in)
- Weight: 70 kg (154 lb; 11 st 0 lb)

Cycling career
- Sport: Cycling
- Discipline: Road
- Role: Rider; Directeur sportif
- Rider type: Climbing specialist

Amateur team
- 1996–1999: Zalf–Euromobil–Fior

Professional teams
- 1998: → Asics–CGA (stagiaire)
- 1999: Riso Scotti
- 2000: Amica Chips–Tacconi Sport
- 2001–2003: Fassa Bortolo
- 2004–2006: Team CSC
- 2007: Discovery Channel
- 2008–2014: Liquigas
- 2015: Tinkoff–Saxo

Managerial teams
- 2016: Tinkoff
- 2017: Trek–Segafredo
- 2018: Polartec–Kometa

Major wins
- Grand Tours Tour de France Young rider classification (2002) 1 individual stage (2004) Giro d'Italia General classification (2006, 2010) 6 individual stages (2005, 2006, 2010) 2 TTT stages (2006, 2010) Stage races Danmark Rundt (2005) Critérium International (2006) Giro del Trentino (2009)

Ivan Basso (born 26 November 1977) is an Italian former professional road bicycle racer, who rode professionally between 1999 and 2015 for seven different teams. Basso, nicknamed Ivan the Terrible, was considered among the best mountain riders in the professional field in the early 21st century, and was considered one of the strongest stage race riders. He is a double winner of the Giro d'Italia, having won the race in 2006 for Team CSC and 2010 for Liquigas–Doimo.

In 2007, Basso admitted to planning the use of blood doping and was suspended for two years. His suspension ended on 24 October 2008, and he returned to racing two days later in the Japan Cup, where he placed a close third behind Damiano Cunego and Giovanni Visconti. He later returned to racing in his home tour, and in 2010, he won his second Giro d'Italia, winning two stages along the way.

== Biography ==
He was born in Gallarate, located in the province of Varese in Lombardy. He grew up next door to Claudio Chiappucci, a former three-time stage winner in the Tour de France who was suspended for two years after being proven guilty of doping several times.

As an amateur, he finished second in the road race at the 1995 UCI Juniors Road World Championships and his first big result was winning the under-23 road race at the 1998 UCI Road World Championships. In his youth he fiercely competed with fellow Italian riders Giuliano Figueras and especially Danilo Di Luca who proclaimed he would have won the under-23 World Championship himself had it not been for the team tactics. Before Basso could turn professional, his parents wanted to see him finish his Technical Geometry studies. He turned professional with Davide Boifava's Riso Scotti–Vinavil team in 1999, where he rode his first Giro d'Italia. He did not finish the three-week race, but he made it a priority to win it someday. In 2000, with the team now called Amica Chips–Tacconi Sport, he won his first professional victories in the Regio-Tour.

=== Promising results ===
In 2001, he moved to Fassa Bortolo under the guidance of sporting director Giancarlo Ferretti. He scored several notable victories in 2001, and he made his Tour de France debut in the 2001 edition. His attack on the Bastille Day stage prompted a five-man breakaway which rode for the victory, but Basso crashed on a mountain descent and was forced to abandon the race.

His next two years were devoid of significant wins, even though he had promising rides in the Tour de France. In the 2002 Tour de France, Basso finished 11th overall and won the young rider classification, the award presented to the best-placed rider in the general classification under the age of 25.

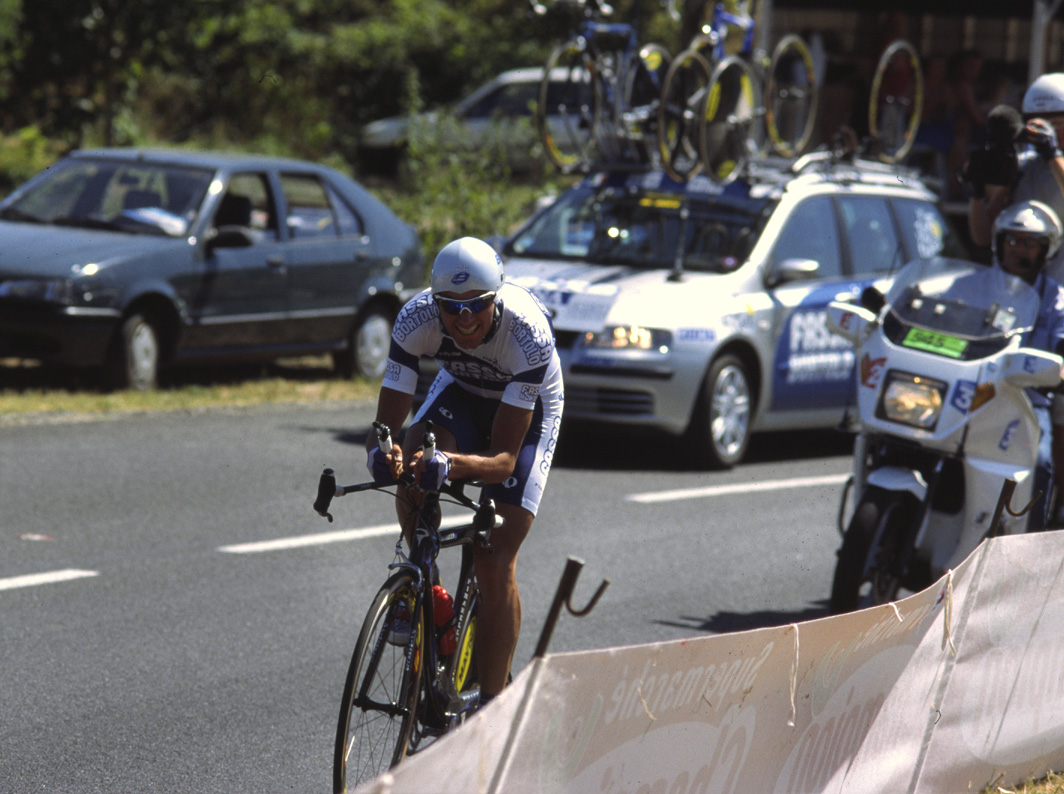
Basso during the 2003 Tour de France

He impressed again in the 2003 Tour de France, finishing seventh overall in spite of receiving little help from his Fassa Bortolo teammates who, after dedicating their efforts in the first part of the race to help Alessandro Petacchi win four stages, had to pull out due to food poisoning, leaving only two riders to help Basso. Despite his good results as the best placed Italian rider in the Tour de France, he was behind fellow Italian teammate Dario Frigo in the Fassa Bortolo pecking order for the biggest race in Italy, the Giro. After the promising start to his Fassa Bortolo career, Basso's relationship with Ferretti turned sour. Basso failed to respond well to the management methods of the "iron sergeant", who thought Basso did not win enough races.

Apart from the individual time trial stages, Basso had only lost around a single minute to winner Lance Armstrong in the 2003 Tour, and he was not short of new team offers. Despite strong rumours sending him to the U.S. Postal Service team, Basso moved to Team CSC for the 2004 season, under the guidance of team manager Bjarne Riis. At Team CSC, Basso was to fill the role as team captain, which Tyler Hamilton had left vacant at the Danish outfit, with the main aim to be a challenger in the Tour de France. Basso's weakness was the time trial, and before the 2004 season he and teammate Carlos Sastre trained in a wind tunnel at the Massachusetts Institute of Technology to improve their aerodynamics and positioning on the bike. The time trial skill of Basso was one of the main points of improvement over the next years.

=== Heir apparent ===
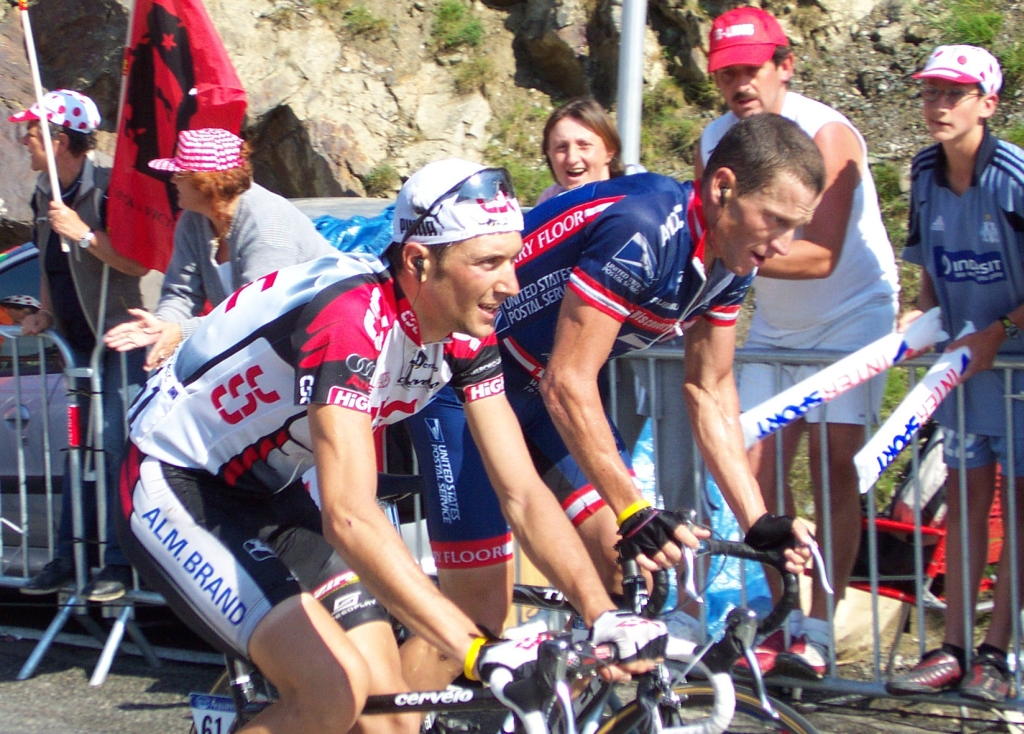
Basso (left) alongside Lance Armstrong at the 2004 Tour de France. Basso achieved his first Grand Tour stage victory at the race, on the twelfth stage.

Basso looked impressive in the 2004 Tour de France, winning stage 12 ahead of eventual winner Lance Armstrong, his first victory since 2001. His overall time was hurt by relatively poor time trial results: he only finished 8th on the stage 16 time trial up the mountain Alpe d'Huez, where he was caught and passed by Armstrong, and 6th in the stage 19 time trial. In all, he lost a combined 5 minutes and 13 seconds in the two stages. His time loss on the last time trial effectively sent Basso down to third place behind Andreas Klöden, and Basso finished 6:40 behind overall winner Armstrong. He ended the season, participating with the Italian national team in the 2004 UCI Road World Championships in Verona, helping fellow Italian Luca Paolini get a bronze medal. In the off-season, Team CSC was in a financial struggle. Even as Bjarne Riis let riders who received superior offers from other teams leave, Basso did not move to the Discovery Channel team even though an economically more lucrative contract was proposed.

January 2005 saw the death of Basso's mother, who died after battling cancer. Basso went on to focus on the 2005 Giro d'Italia, in her memory, as his main aim for that season. By both focusing on winning the Giro and the Tour, he was going against the trend of only aiming for one big race a season, a tactic most notably employed successfully by Lance Armstrong. Basso wore the pink jersey as leader of the General classification in the Giro d'Italia until severe stomach problems caused him to lose the lead on stage 13 on the Passo delle Erbe. He lost another 40 minutes during the 14th stage, a mountain stage which included the Stelvio Pass, and thus effectively ended his bid for overall honours. No longer dangerous to the other main riders, Basso decided to continue in the race with the objective of winning individual stages. He did manage to achieve this goal at stage 17, a mountain stage. He also won the 18th stage, a time trial, ahead of teammate David Zabriskie, demonstrating the improvement he had made in this area.

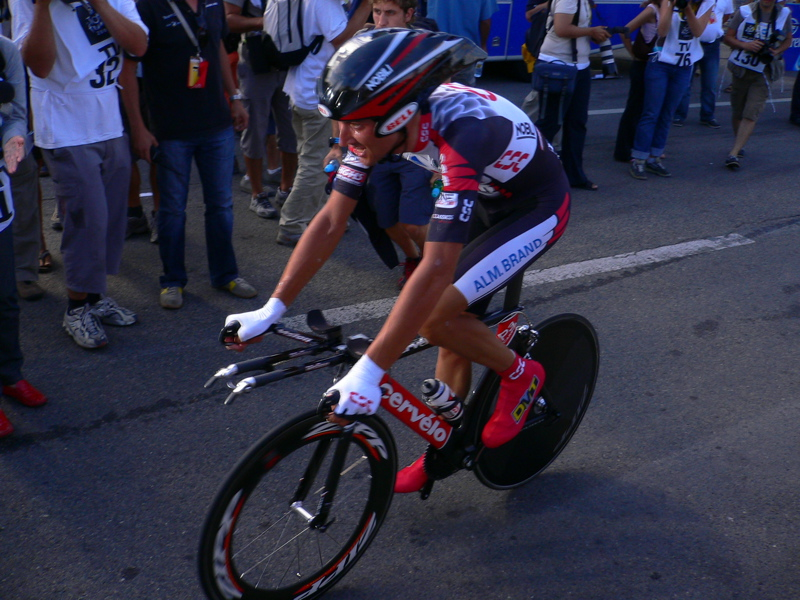
Basso at the 2005 Tour de France, where he finished the race second overall.

At the 2005 Tour de France, he started out comparatively weakly on stage 10, the first mountain stage of the race, where he trailed the front group by a minute. But for the rest of the race, Basso was once again the only rider to keep up with the race leader, Lance Armstrong, in the mountains, and on occasion, he tried to pressure the eventual winner by going on the attack. Basso was still weaker in the time trials, although he had improved significantly when compared to 2004. He lost a collective 3:47 over two time trial stages, as Basso placed second overall in the Tour, 4:40 behind Lance Armstrong. During the 2005 Tour de France, Basso signed a new three-year contract with Team CSC.

=== 2006 Giro d'Italia ===
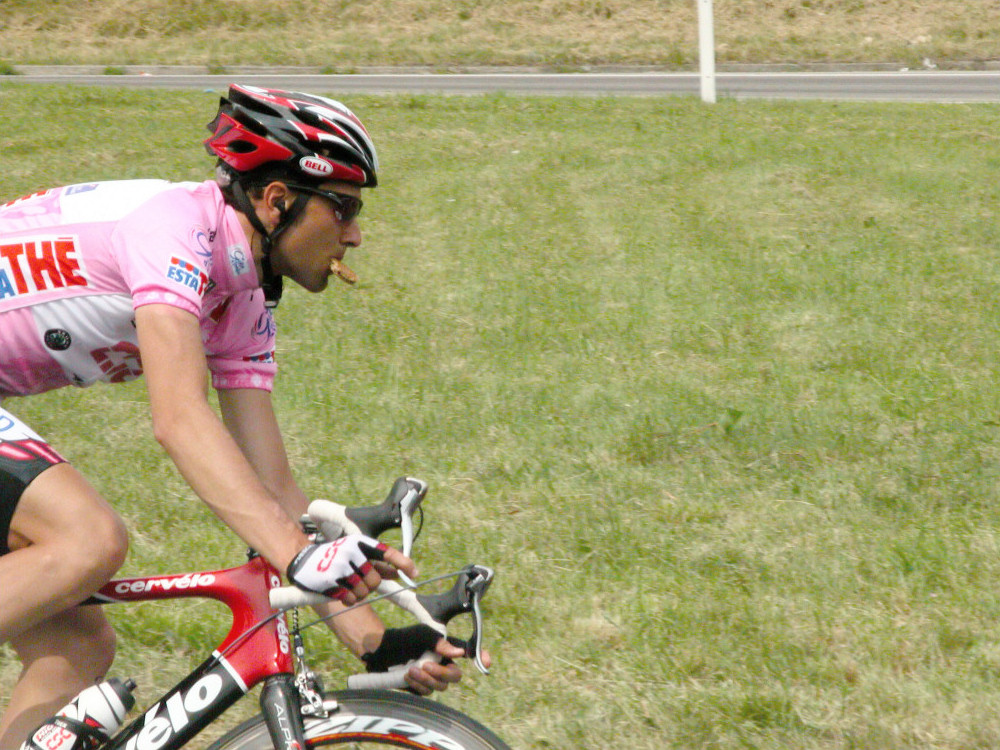
Basso at the 2006 Giro d'Italia

Following his overall rank of 28th in the 2005 Giro d'Italia, Basso returned to the Giro in 2006, intending to win. Following a good performance in the stage 1 time trial, Basso and his CSC teammates won the 5th stage, a team time trial. Basso's first solo stage victory came on the 8th stage, the first mountaintop finish of the Giro, where he countered an attack by Damiano Cunego and rode to the finish by himself. That victory also allowed him to gain enough time on his rivals to put him in the leader's pink jersey for the first time in the race, a jersey which he would hold on to for the remaining 13 stages.

Stage 11 was a long and flat individual time trial where Basso finished in second place, losing only to former two-time world time trial champion Jan Ullrich, beating riders like the Italian national time trial champion Marco Pinotti. During the last week of the 2006 Giro, Basso beat his main rivals for the general classification, and won stages 16 and 20 along the way. His victory in Stage 20, where he rode to a solo victory on the final ascent into Aprica after riding away from rival Gilberto Simoni, was notable when he, already sure of his victory, pulled out a picture of his newly born son Santiago, and held it aloft as he crossed the finish line. Santiago Basso had been born the previous day, and Basso had not yet seen his son in the flesh, having been given the picture only hours before the stage started. When rival Simoni rolled across the line over a minute behind Basso, he was clearly upset at being beaten and made a remark that Basso's dominance at that year's Giro was "extra-terrestrial." Basso eventually finished 9 minutes 18 seconds up on the second placed rider, José Enrique Gutiérrez, the largest margin of victory in the Giro d'Italia since 1965. After the last stage of the race, Basso declared that he would continue along his pre-season plan to also ride the Tour de France.

=== Operación Puerto and the 2006 Tour de France ===
On 30 June 2006, the management of the Tour de France announced at a press conference that a number of riders, including Ivan Basso, would not be riding in the race due to rumours of blood doping stemming from the Operación Puerto doping case in Spain. According to the investigation, Basso was allegedly given blood doping by doctor Eufemiano Fuentes in a Spanish clinic. No formal charges had been raised, but following an agreement between the managers of all the ProTour teams, any rider under suspicion of doping would not be allowed to start in ProTour races. This forced CSC to remove Basso from their squad for the 2006 Tour.

Speculation in the Italian press suggested that, should Basso not be banned, he would be joining the Discovery Channel team. Team CSC described these suggestions as just rumours. Later, CSC manager Bjarne Riis was reported stating that it was unlikely that Basso could return to CSC without proving he had no contact with Fuentes, as Basso's contract specified that he could receive no outside medical assistance. Riis conceded that it might be impossible for Basso to prove beyond doubt. Rumours also talked about Basso moving to Team Milram or Barloworld (a non-ProTour team). The Italian National Olympic Committee (CONI) proceedings commenced in late August 2006.

==== From CSC to Team Discovery Channel ====
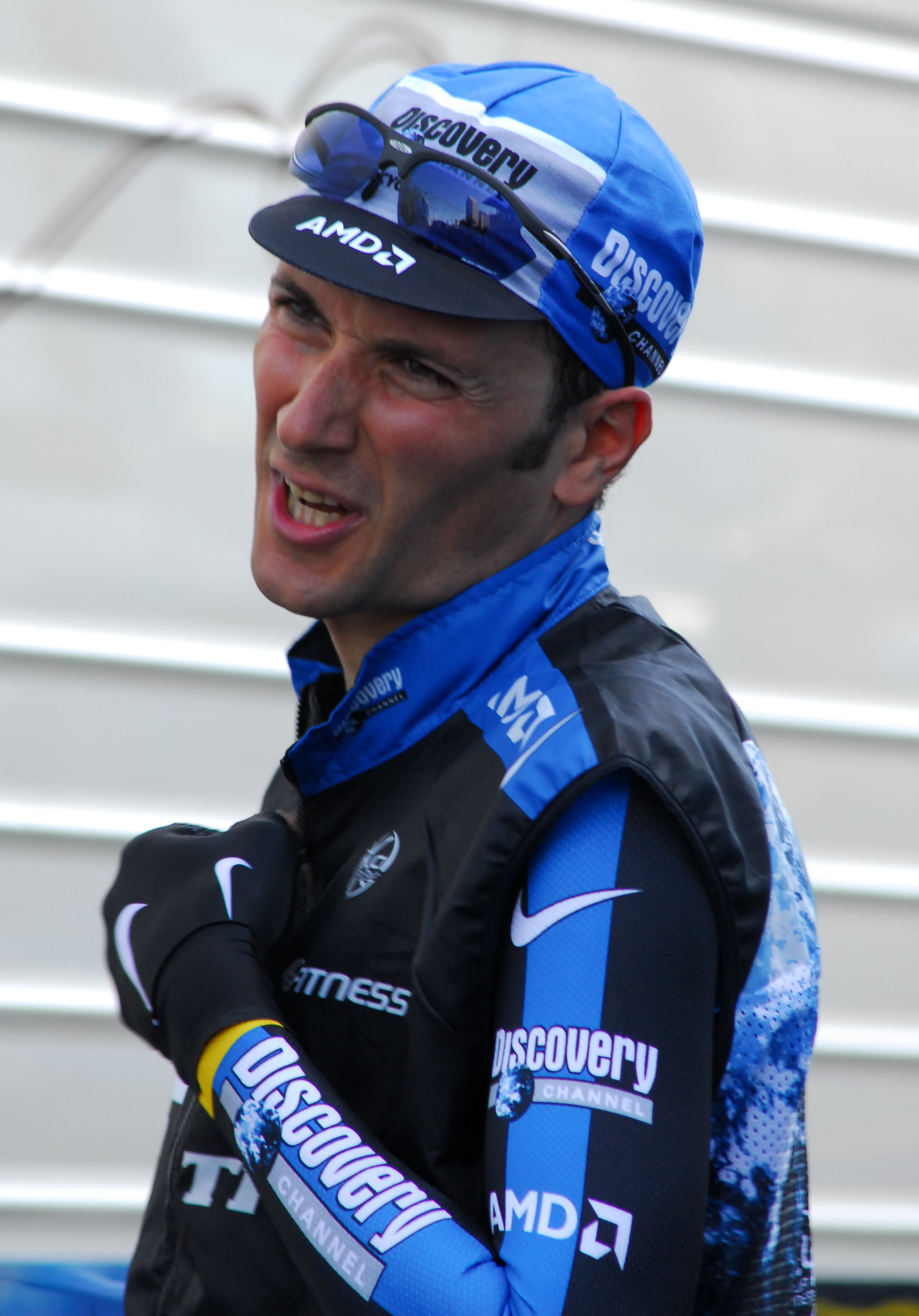
Basso at the 2007 Tour of California

On 18 October 2006, Team CSC announced that his contract had been terminated by mutual consent. On 27 October 2006, Basso was acquitted of any involvement in the Operation Puerto events by the committee, due to insufficient evidence.

On 9 November 2006, Basso announced he was joining Lance Armstrong's former team, Discovery Channel. The announcement was made in Austin, Texas, and Basso joined the team on 3 December 2006 for the first unofficial training camp. Basso rode for Levi Leipheimer during the 2007 Tour of California, and also raced Tirreno–Adriatico, where he crashed.

==== Puerto case reopened ====
On 24 April 2007, Basso was suspended by Discovery Channel when the Italian National Olympic Committee (CONI) reopened his case. On 30 April 2007, Team Discovery Channel announced that Basso would be released from his contract. Basso requested to leave the team, citing "personal reasons related to the re-opened investigation by the Italian National Olympic Committee (CONI)." Basso met with the General Manager of Team Discovery Channel, Bill Stapleton, and Johan Bruyneel, the Team Director, and the two agreed to allow Basso to leave the team. While still claiming to never have actually engaged in blood doping, Basso admitted contacting Fuentes' clinic with the intention to engage in blood doping.

Basso appeared before the Italian National Olympic Committee (CONI) on 2 May 2007. On 7 May 2007, Basso admitted his involvement with the drug scandal to the Italian National Olympic Committee (CONI). In a later press conference, he stated it was "attempted doping", and that while he had not actually undergone doping, he was "fully aware that an attempt at doping is tantamount to doping" and that "[he would] serve [his] suspension and then return to race."

On 15 June 2007, Basso received a two-year ban. The time he had already spent under team suspension whilst riding for CSC and temporary suspension since leaving Discovery was taken into consideration, which meant he was banned until 25 October 2008.

=== Return after suspension ===
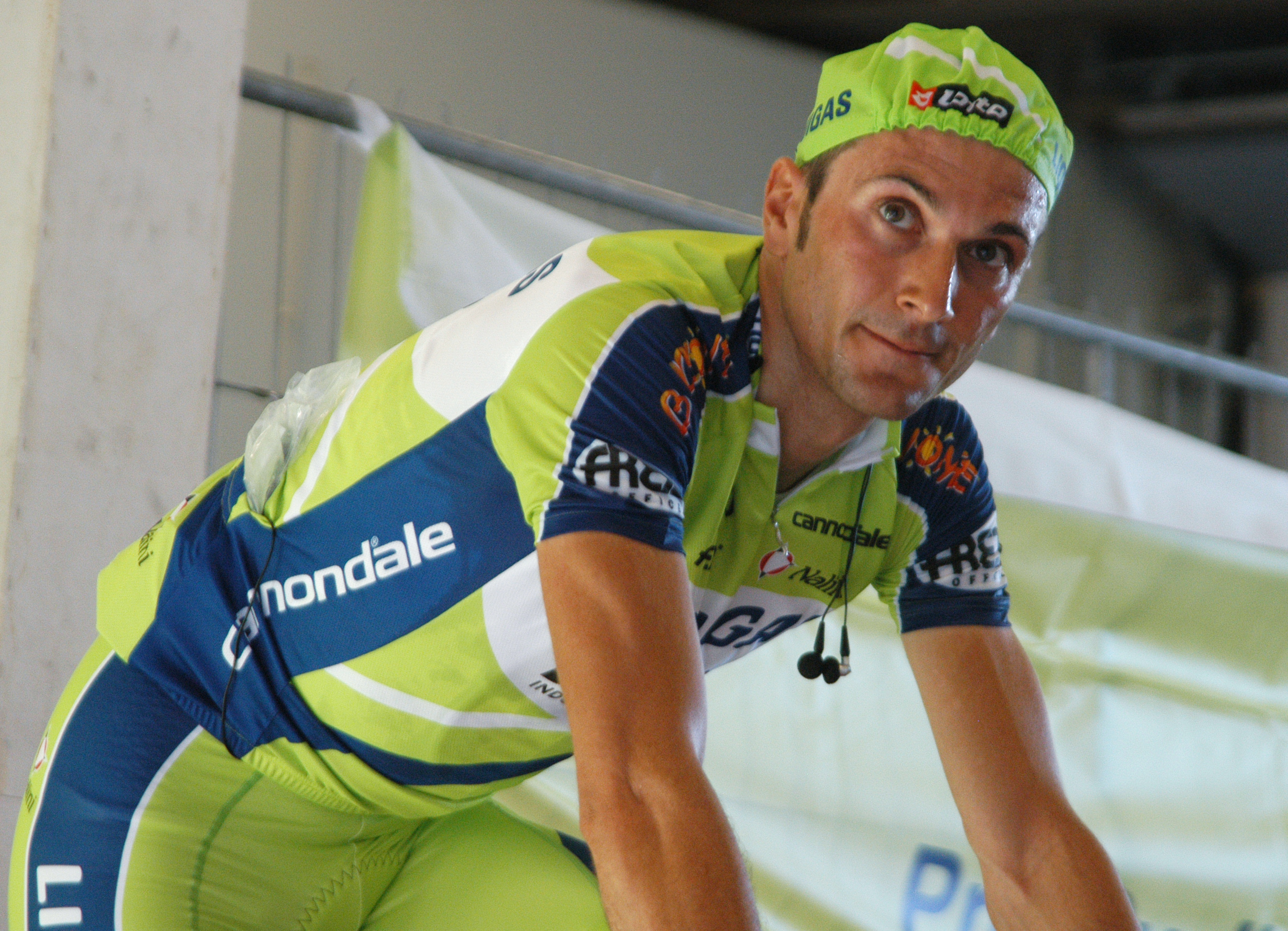
Basso at the 2009 Vuelta a Espana

After his return, Basso signed a two-year contract with Liquigas, his first race being in the Japan Cup on 26 October 2008. He proceeded to finish third, behind Damiano Cunego and Giovanni Visconti. In April 2009, he claimed overall victory in the Italian stage race Giro del Trentino. He then competed in his main objective for the year, the Giro d'Italia, where he finished fifth behind eventual winner Denis Menchov, Danilo Di Luca, fellow Liquigas rider Franco Pellizotti and 2008 Tour de France winner Carlos Sastre. He also placed 4th in the Vuelta a España behind Alejandro Valverde, Samuel Sánchez, and Cadel Evans respectively.

==== 2010 ====
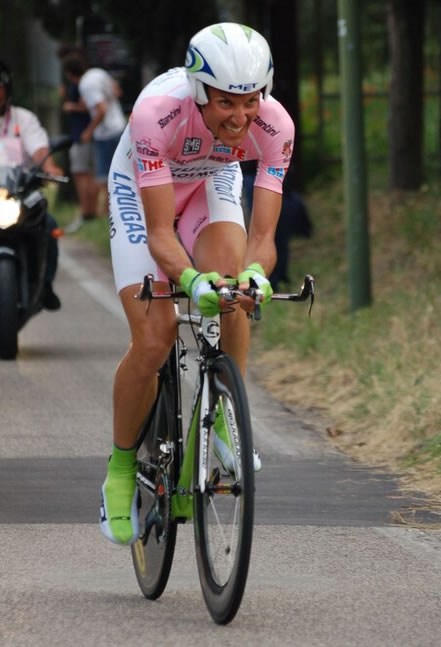
Basso wearing the maglia rosa at the 2010 Giro d'Italia

In 2010, Basso aimed to win his second Giro d'Italia, leading Liquigas–Doimo with his teammate Vincenzo Nibali. Despite having a quiet start to the race, he won the 15th stage of the race atop Monte Zoncolan, after his Liquigas team had set the pace for some 150 kilometres (93 miles) in order to chase down a breakaway. After Stage 19, he led the general classification as a result of out-climbing previous race leader David Arroyo, and held it to the end of the race. This resulted in his second Giro win, after 2006. Basso then focused on the Tour de France where he attempted to win the Giro and the Tour during the same year, but he ended up struggling through the last week, finishing 32nd.

==== 2011 ====
In 2011, Basso skipped the Giro d'Italia to focus on the Tour de France. After having a good start over the first 2 weeks, sitting 5th overall, Basso struggled on stages 16 and 17 after being dropped on the final descents, and later finished 7th overall.

==== 2012 ====
In 2012, Basso started the season with quiet form, focusing on the Giro d'Italia, but only finishing 5th overall.

=== Tinkoff-Saxo ===
In August 2014, it was announced that Basso would be joining Tinkoff–Saxo from 2015 on a two-year deal. In July 2015, Basso was diagnosed with testicular cancer and immediately withdrew from the Tour de France to seek treatment in Italy. Basso received support from a number of people including Lance Armstrong. Basso made the announcement to the media in those terms: "I have a bad announcement to give to you guys", Basso said. "On stage 5, I had a really small crash but in the crash I touched my testicle on the saddle and for a few days, I felt a small pain. Yesterday we spoke with the doctor of the Tour de France and we decided to go to make a special analysis in the hospital and the examination gave me bad news. I have a small cancer in the left testicle."

In September 2015 Tinkoff–Saxo confirmed that Basso had recovered fully after undergoing surgery in Milan and that he would be able to race again. However, after Basso had talks with the team it was announced that he would retire from competition the following month, whilst remaining with Tinkoff–Saxo in a management role. Basso later followed Alberto Contador to Trek–Segafredo, taking up a support staff position.

== Post racing ==
Following his exit from racing, Basso and Alberto Contador opened up Aurum bikes in 2020.

== Personal life ==
Basso resides in Cassano Magnago, Italy, with his wife and four children.

He has now purchased land in his home town to start a blueberry farm where he hopes to employ locals as well as make an investment for his retirement from cycling as the future of the European economy is uncertain. Basso has already begun planting; his farm is called "Il Borgo" or "the village".

He is not related to Italian cyclist Marino Basso, nor the bicycle brand Basso.

== Major results ==
1995
2nd Road race, UCI Junior Road World Championships
3rd Overall Giro della Lunigiana
1997
1st Trofeo Città di San Vendemiano
1st Piccola Sanremo
9th Trofeo Banca Popolare di Vicenza
9th Gran Premio Palio del Recioto
1998
1st Road race, UCI Road World Under-23 Championships
2nd Trofeo Gianfranco Bianchin
6th Trofeo Città di San Vendemiano
8th Firenze–Pistoia
9th Coppa Fiera di Mercatale
1999
2nd Trofeo Matteotti
2nd Giro del Friuli
3rd Gran Premio Palio del Recioto
6th HEW Cyclassics
6th Tre Valli Varesine
6th Gran Premio della Liberazione
7th Gran Premio Industria e Commercio di Prato
2000
2nd Overall Regio-Tour

1st Stages 1 & 3b (ITT)

5th Giro dell'Emilia
6th Tre Valli Varesine
7th Trofeo Andratx-Mirador d'Es Colomer
8th Giro del Lazio
2001
1st Stage 1 Tour Méditerranéen
1st Stage 5 Euskal Bizikleta
1st Stage 5 Tour of Austria
2nd La Flèche Wallonne
4th Road race, National Road Championships
4th Trofeo dell'Etna
6th Giro dell'Emilia
7th Coppa Placci
8th Trofeo Melinda
9th Gran Premio della Costa Etruschi
2002
1st Young rider classification, Tour de France
2nd Overall Volta a la Comunitat Valenciana
2nd Giro dell'Emilia
3rd Liège–Bastogne–Liège
5th Gran Premio Città di Camaiore
6th Giro del Lazio
8th Tre Valli Varesine
9th Züri-Metzgete
2003
2nd Clásica de San Sebastián
5th Overall Volta a Catalunya
6th Giro del Veneto
6th Coppa Placci
7th Overall Tour de France
7th GP Industria & Artigianato di Larciano
7th Coppa Bernocchi
8th Giro di Toscana
10th Liège–Bastogne–Liège
10th Firenze–Pistoia
2004
1st Giro dell'Emilia
2nd Overall Tour Méditerranéen
3rd Overall Tour de France

1st Stage 12

3rd Giro di Lombardia
6th Clásica de San Sebastián
7th Overall Tour de Romandie
8th Liège–Bastogne–Liège
2005
1st Overall Danmark Rundt

1st Stages 1, 2, 3 & 5 (ITT)

Giro d'Italia

1st Stages 17 & 18 (ITT)
Held after Stages 11–12

2nd Overall Tour de France
4th Overall Critérium International
2006
1st Overall Giro d'Italia

1st Stages 5 (TTT), 8, 16 & 20

1st Overall Critérium International

1st Stage 2

4th Overall Circuit de la Sarthe

1st Stage 2b (ITT)

6th Overall Tirreno–Adriatico
10th Liège–Bastogne–Liège
2008
3rd Japan Cup
2009
1st Overall Giro del Trentino
3rd Overall Giro d'Italia
4th Overall Vuelta a España
4th Trofeo Melinda
5th Overall Tirreno–Adriatico
5th Overall Tour de San Luis
2010
1st Overall Giro d'Italia

1st Stages 4 (TTT) & 15

1st Gran Premio Industria e Commercio Artigianato Carnaghese
5th Overall Giro del Trentino
2011
1st Overall Giro di Padania

1st Stage 4

1st Gran Premio di Lugano
4th Overall Tirreno–Adriatico
4th Giro di Lombardia
7th Overall Tour de France
7th Overall Volta a Catalunya
10th Trofeo Laigueglia
10th Japan Cup
2012
1st Japan Cup
5th Overall Giro d'Italia
2013
4th Overall Settimana Internazionale di Coppi e Bartali
8th Overall Tour de Pologne
9th Overall Tour of Beijing
10th Overall Vuelta a Burgos

=== Grand Tour general classification results timeline ===
Grand Tour	1999	2000	2001	2002	2003	2004	2005	2006	2007	2008	2009	2010	2011	2012	2013	2014	2015
Giro d'Italia	DNF	52	—	—	—	—	28	1	—	—	3	1	—	5	—	15	51
Tour de France	—	—	DNF	11	7	3	2	—	—	—	—	31	7	25	—	—	DNF
/ Vuelta a España	—	—	—	—	—	—	—	—	—	—	4	—	—	—	DNF	—	—

Legend
—	Did not compete
DNF	Did not finish

== See also ==
- List of doping cases in cycling
