= 2007 Danmark Rundt =

2006–2007 UCI Europe Tour

Race details
- Dates: 1–5 August 2007
- Stages: 6
- Distance: 842 km (523 mi)

Results
Jersey awarded to the overall winner	Winner	Kurt Asle Arvesen (Norway)	(CSC)
	Second	Enrico Gasparotto (Italy)	
	Third	Matti Breschel (Denmark)	
	Points	Mark Cavendish (Great Britain)	
Jersey awarded to the mountains classification winner	Mountains	Jacob Moe Rasmussen (Denmark)	
	Young rider	Enrico Gasparotto (Italy)	
	Team	(Denmark) CSC	

The 2007 Danmark Rundt was a men's road bicycle race held from 1 to 5 August 2008. It was the 17th edition of the men's stage race, which was established in 1985. The race was won by Norwegian rider Kurt Asle Arvesen of Team CSC. Italian rider Enrico Gasparotto of Team Liquigas finished second by 14 seconds with Dane Matti Breschel of Team CSC third.

The race was made up of six stages covering a total of 842 kilometres (523 mi) and included an individual time trial of 12.4 kilometres (7.7 mi).

== Schedule ==
Stage	Route	Distance	Date	Winner
1	Thisted > Aalborg	175 km	1 August	(Italy) Francesco Chicchi
2	Aars > Aarhus	195 km	2 August	(Denmark) Matti Breschel
3	Aarhus > Vejle	190 km	3 August	(Norway) Kurt Asle Arvesen
4	Skælskør > Ringsted	95 km	4 August	(Italy) Francesco Chicchi
5 (ITT)	Næstved > Næstved	12.4 km	4 August	(Netherlands) Rick Flens
6	Præstø > Frederiksberg	175 km	5 August	(United Kingdom) Mark Cavendish

== Teams ==
Fifteen teams took part in the 2007 race.

== Final classifications ==
Norwegian rider Kurt Asle Arvesen won the race by 14 seconds from Enrico Gasparotto after he won stage 3 on the Kiddesvej climb in Vejle. Dane Matti Breschel came third after having led the race after stages 2, 3 and 4. The victory meant that Arvesen became the first rider to win the Danmark Rundt twice, he had previously won the race in 2004.

With victory in the final stage, Mark Cavendish won the points competition. Jacob Moe Rasmussen was the winner of the mountains classification for best climber. Rasmussen was also awarded the fighters award for the race and Gasparotto won the young riders jersey. Team CSC won the overall team competition from Liquigas with Team T-Mobile in third place.
