= Grote Prijs Gerrie Knetemann =

Cycling race in the Netherlands

Race details
- Date: Late June-Early July
- Region: Gelderland, Netherlands
- English name: Grand Prix Gerrie Knetemann
- Local name: Grote Prijs Gerrie Knetemann (in Dutch)
- Discipline: Road
- Competition: UCI Europe Tour
- Type: One-day race

History
- First edition: 2006
- Editions: 3
- First winner: Roy Sentjens (BEL)
- Most recent: Jonathan Cosby (GBR)

Grote Prijs Gerrie Knetemann was a single-day road bicycle race held annually in June–July in Gelderland, Netherlands from 2006-2008. Since, 2007 the race was organized as a 1.1 event on the UCI Europe Tour.

== Winners men's race ==
Year	Country	Rider	Team
2006	Belgium	Roy Sentjens	Rabobank
2007	Belgium	Olivier Kaisen	Predictor–Lotto

== Winners women's race ==
Year	Country	Rider	Team
2006	Netherlands	Chantal Beltman	Vrienden van het Platteland
2007	Netherlands	Mirjam Melchers	Team Flexpoint
