= Kristoffer Nielsen =

Danish cyclist (born 1985)

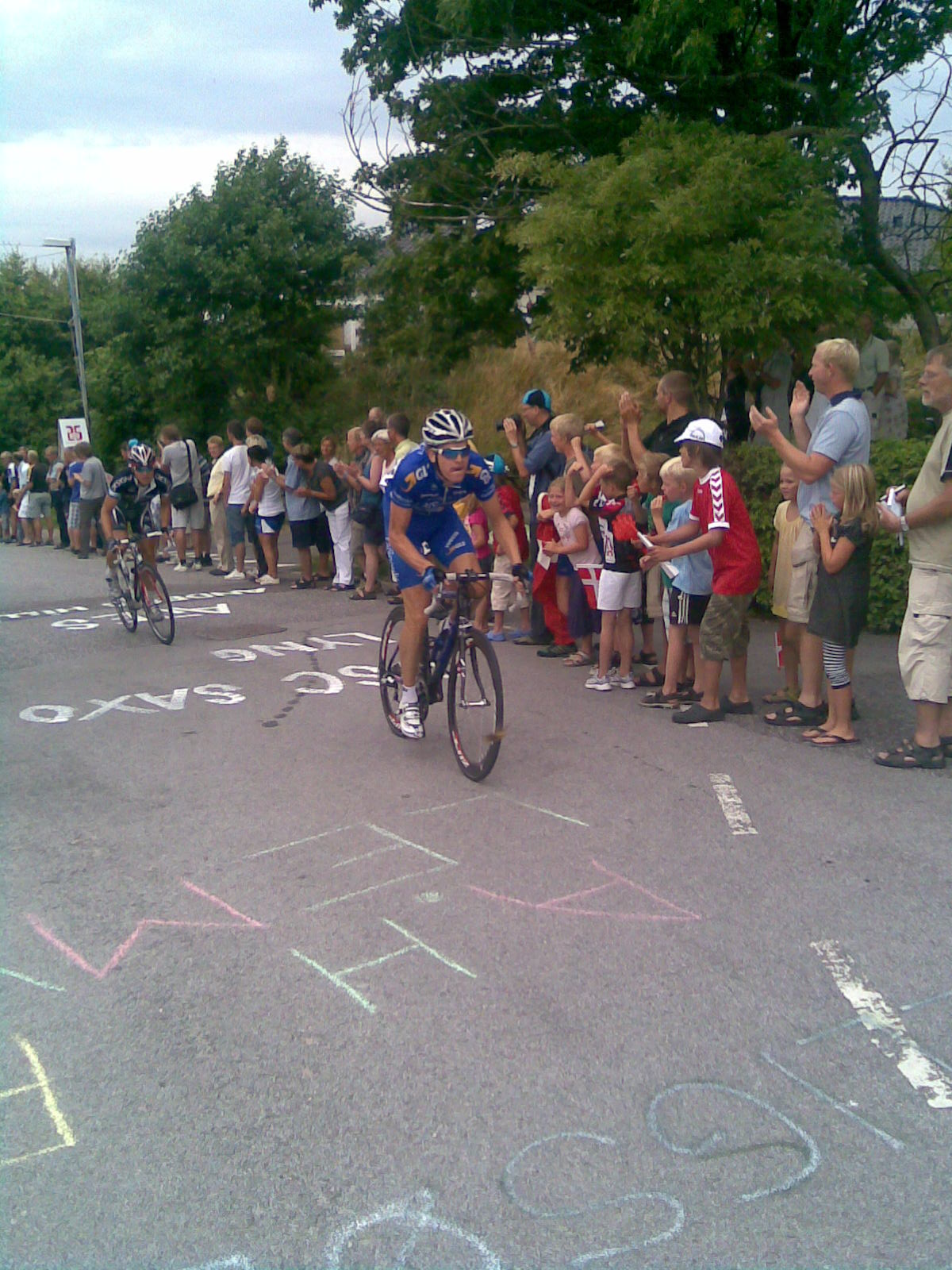

Personal information
- Full name: Kristoffer Gudmund Nielsen
- Born: 20 May 1985 (age 41) Brønshøj, Denmark

Cycling career
- Sport: Cycling
- Discipline: Road
- Role: Rider

Professional teams
- 2004: PH
- 2005–2009: Team GLS

Kristoffer Gudmund Nielsen (born 20 May 1985) is a Danish cyclist.

== Palmares ==
2006
2nd Paris–Roubaix Espoirs
3rd Okolo Slovenska

1st Stage 1

2007
2nd Tour de Normandie
3rd La Côte Picarde
2008
1st Okolo Slovenska
1st Mountains Classification Danmark Rundt
