= Roy Sentjens =

Belgian cyclist (born 1980)

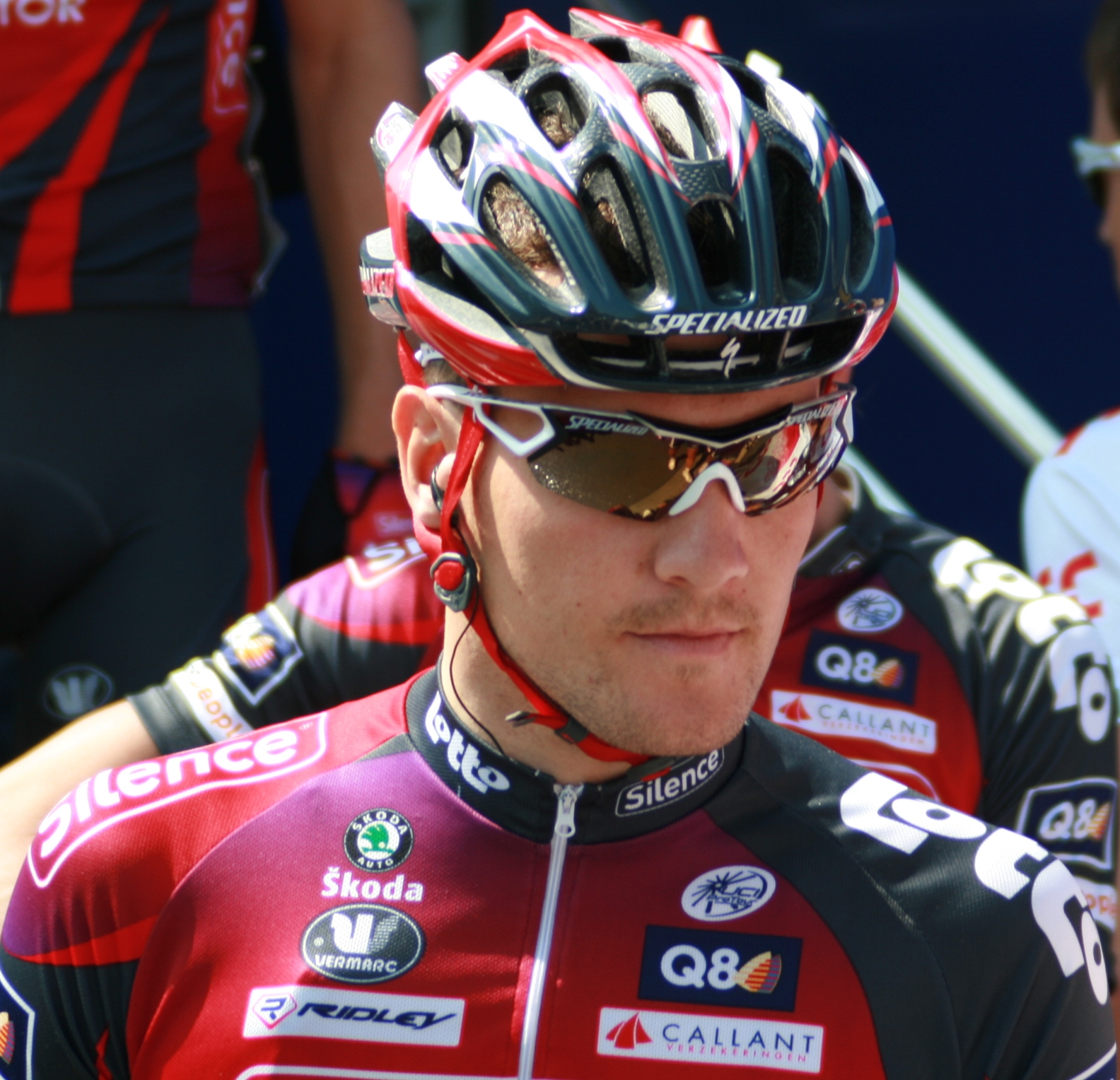
- Sentjens at the 2008 Four Days of Dunkirk.

Personal information
- Full name: Roy Sentjens
- Born: 15 December 1980 (age 45) Neerpelt, Belgium
- Height: 1.90 m (6 ft 3 in)
- Weight: 75 kg (165 lb)

Cycling career
- Sport: Cycling
- Discipline: Road
- Role: Rider

Professional teams
- 2002–2006: Rabobank
- 2007–2009: Predictor–Lotto
- 2010: Team Milram
- 2012–2013: Cycling Team De Rijke

Major wins
- One day races and Classics Kuurne–Brussels–Kuurne (2003)

Roy Sentjens (born 15 December 1980) is a retired Belgian road bicycle racer, who competed as a professional between 2002 and 2013. Sentjens has also previously competed for UCI ProTour team Team Milram. The highlight of his career was victory in the Belgian semi-classic Kuurne–Brussels–Kuurne in 2003. Sentjens started his career with Rabobank in 2002, and transferred to Predictor-Lotto for the 2007 season. Sentjens held dual citizenship, from both Belgium and the Netherlands, and from 2002 until 2004 raced under a Dutch licence. However, in 2005, he changed to a Belgian license as he felt more Belgian than Dutch.

== Career ==
The largest win of Sentjens' career, was also his first. At the 2003 Kuurne–Brussels–Kuurne, he attacked with 2 km to leaving his four companions behind. He held them off to win by 19 seconds.

After being selected to ride the 2010 Vuelta a España did not start stage 12 after a positive doping test came to light.

== Doping ==
On 8 September 2010, while he was riding the 2010 Vuelta a España, it was announced that Sentjens had failed an out of competition doping control and would be suspended from cycling. On 10 September, Sentjens admitted to having doped with EPO that he had obtained in Barcelona, Spain, and declined to request the testing of his B-sample. He also announced his immediate retirement from professional cycling. He later reversed his decision to retire, and returned to cycling when the ban had expired.

Speaking about his decision to dope, Sentjens explained on his personal website: "My season was already a disaster. I did everything I could but I didn’t meet up to my own expectations. I couldn’t sleep anymore, thinking all the time how in the hell I could still improve, I did everything. But even that did not help and I fell into a depression."

== Major results ==
1999
9th Ronde van Overijssel
2000
6th Omloop der Kempen
2001
1st Ronde Van Vlaanderen Beloften
8th Overall Ster Elektrotoer
2002
2nd Nationale Sluitingsprijs
2003
1st Kuurne–Brussels–Kuurne
4th Nationale Sluitingsprijs
5th Le Samyn
5th Memorial Rik Van Steenbergen
10th OZ Tour Beneden-Maas
2004
1st Profronde van Fryslan
5th Grand Prix Rudy Dhaenens
7th Nationale Sluitingsprijs
8th Overall Tour of Belgium
10th Scheldeprijs
2005
5th Grote Prijs Stad Zottegem
6th Kuurne–Brussels–Kuurne
6th Noord Nederland Tour
7th Omloop Het Volk
9th Overall Three Days of De Panne
9th Overall Danmark Rundt
2006
1st Grote Prijs Gerrie Knetemann
4th Noord Nederland Tour
4th Tour de Rijke
6th Grand Prix de Wallonie
10th Overall Tour de Luxembourg
2007
1st Druivenkoers Overijse
2nd Nationale Sluitingsprijs
5th Overall Tour de Picardie
6th E3 Prijs Vlaanderen
10th Delta Profronde van Midden-Zeeland
2008
1st Grote Prijs Stad Zottegem
2009
3rd Grand Prix de Wallonie
4th Overall Driedaagse van West-Vlaanderen
5th Le Samyn
6th Omloop van het Houtland
2010
8th Dutch Food Valley Classic
2012
9th Münsterland Giro
2013
5th Beverbeek Classic
8th Ronde van Drenthe
