= Martin Müller (cyclist) =

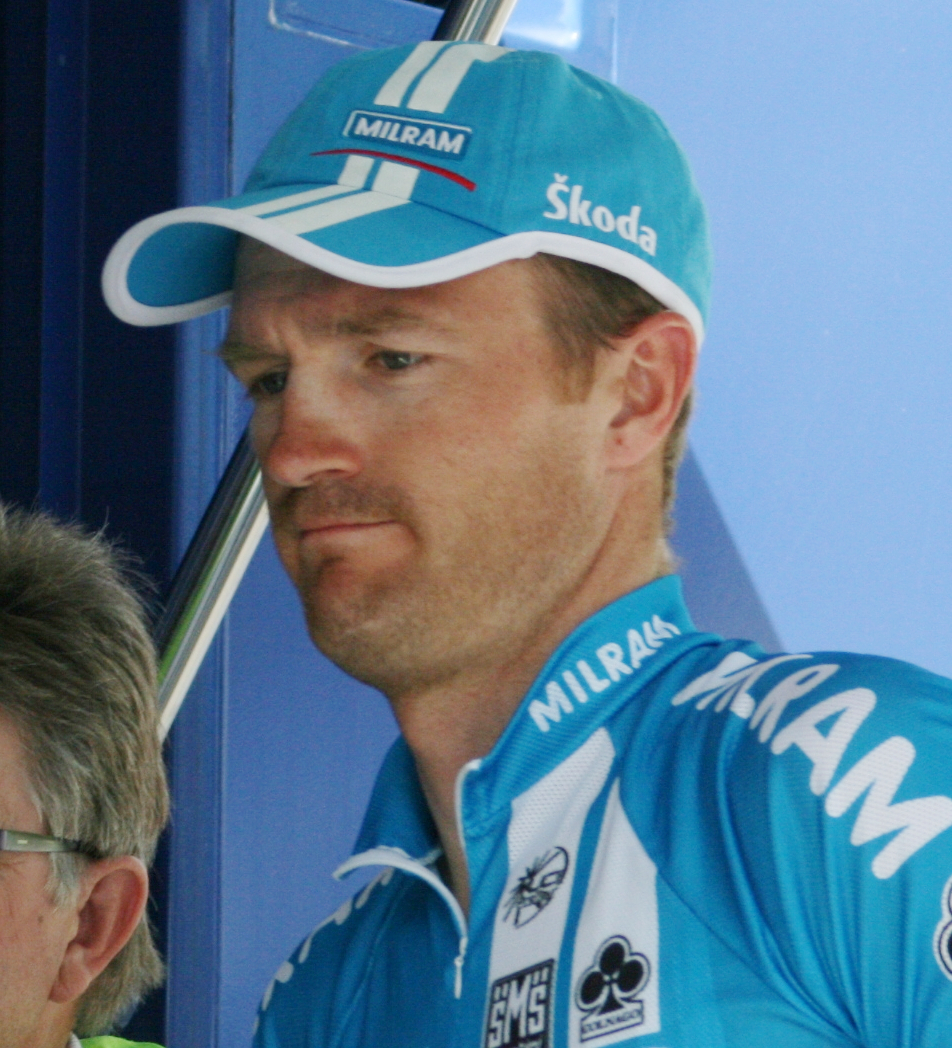

Personal information
- Full name: Martin Müller
- Born: 5 April 1974 (age 52) Forst, Bezirk Cottbus, East Germany

Cycling career
- Sport: Cycling
- Current team: Retired
- Discipline: Road
- Role: Rider

Professional teams
- 1997–1999: Agro-Adler-Brandenburg
- 2000–2001: Team Cologne
- 2002–2005: Wiesenhof
- 2006–2009: Team Milram

Martin Müller (born 5 April 1974 in Forst) is a German former professional road bicycle racer who last rode for UCI ProTour team Team Milram. Müller retired after the 2009 season.

== Major results ==
- German U19 Road Race Champion (1992)
- Rheinland-Pfalz Rundfahrt – stage 7 (1997)
- GP Landwirtschaft (1997)
- Karkonosze Tour – stage 4 (1999)
