= 2018 Tour of Belgium =

2018 UCI Europe Tour

Race details
- Dates: 23–27 May
- Stages: 5
- Distance: 655.5 km (407.3 mi)
- Winning time: 14h 43' 37"

Results
Jersey awarded to the overall winner	Winner	Jens Keukeleire (BEL)	(Lotto–Soudal)
	Second	Jelle Vanendert (BEL)	(Lotto–Soudal)
	Third	Dion Smith (NZ)	(Wanty–Groupe Gobert)
Jersey awarded to the points classification winner	Points	André Greipel (GER)	(Lotto–Soudal)
Jersey awarded to the combativity classification winner	Combativity	Thomas Sprengers (BEL)	(Sport Vlaanderen–Baloise)

The 2018 Tour of Belgium, known as the 2018 Baloise Belgium Tour for sponsorship purposes, was the 88th edition of the Tour of Belgium cycling stage race. It took place from 23 to 27 May 2018 in Belgium, as part of the 2018 UCI Europe Tour; it was categorised as a 2.HC race. Jens Keukeleire (Lotto–Soudal) successfully defended his title, winning the race for a second consecutive year.

== Teams ==
20 teams were selected to take part in Tour of Belgium. Three of these were UCI WorldTeams, with eleven UCI Professional Continental teams, five UCI Continental teams and a team representing the Belgium national team.

UCI WorldTeams

- Astana
- Lotto–Soudal
- Team Katusha–Alpecin

UCI Professional Continental teams

- Aqua Blue Sport
- Burgos BH
- Bardiani–CSF
- Cofidis
- Fortuneo–Samsic
- Roompot–Nederlandse Loterij
- Sport Vlaanderen–Baloise
- Vital Concept
- Vérandas Willems–Crelan
- Wanty–Groupe Gobert
- WB Aqua Protect Veranclassic

UCI Continental teams

- Cibel–Cebon
- Pauwels Sauzen–Vastgoedservice
- Sovac–Natura4Ever
- Tarteletto–Isorex
- Telenet–Fidea Lions

National teams

- Belgium

== Schedule ==
Stage	Date	Course	Distance	Type	Winner
1	23 May	Buggenhout to Buggenhout	178.8 km (111.1 mi)	Flat stage	André Greipel (GER)
2	24 May	Lochristi to Knokke-Heist	150.4 km (93.5 mi)	Flat stage	André Greipel (GER)
3	25 May	Bornem to Bornem	10.6 km (6.6 mi)	Individual time trial	Christophe Laporte (FRA)
4	26 May	Wanze to Wanze	147.3 km (91.5 mi)	Intermediate stage	Jelle Vanendert (BEL)
5	27 May	Landen to Tongeren	168.4 km (104.6 mi)	Flat stage	Bryan Coquard (FRA)
Total		655.5 km (407.3 mi)			

== Stages ==
=== Stage 1 ===
23 May 2018 — Buggenhout to Buggenhout, 178.8 km (111.1 mi)

Result of Stage 1
Rank	Rider	Team	Time
1	André Greipel (GER)	Lotto–Soudal	3h 54' 29"
2	Riccardo Minali (ITA)	Astana	+ 0"
3	Tim Merlier (BEL)	Vérandas Willems–Crelan	+ 0"
4	Timothy Dupont (BEL)	Wanty–Groupe Gobert	+ 0"
5	Bryan Coquard (FRA)	Vital Concept	+ 0"
6	Christophe Laporte (FRA)	Cofidis	+ 0"
7	Wouter Wippert (NED)	Roompot–Nederlandse Loterij	+ 0"
8	Jenthe Biermans (BEL)	Team Katusha–Alpecin	+ 0"
9	Jelle Mannaerts (BEL)	Tarteletto–Isorex	+ 0"
10	Bram Welten (NED)	Fortuneo–Samsic	+ 0"

General classification after Stage 1
Rank	Rider	Team	Time
1	André Greipel (GER)	Lotto–Soudal	3h 54' 19"
2	Riccardo Minali (ITA)	Astana	+ 4"
3	Michael Boroš (CZE)	Pauwels Sauzen–Vastgoedservice	+ 5"
4	Aimé De Gendt (BEL)	Sport Vlaanderen–Baloise	+ 5"
5	Tim Merlier (BEL)	Vérandas Willems–Crelan	+ 6"
6	Conor Dunne (IRL)	Aqua Blue Sport	+ 6"
7	Kenny Molly (BEL)	Belgium (national team)	+ 8"
8	Dieter Bouvry (BEL)	Cibel–Cebon	+ 8"
9	Timothy Dupont (BEL)	Wanty–Groupe Gobert	+ 10"
10	Bryan Coquard (FRA)	Vital Concept	+ 10"

=== Stage 2 ===
24 May 2018 — Lochristi to Knokke-Heist, 162.1 km (100.7 mi)

Result of Stage 2
Rank	Rider	Team	Time
1	André Greipel (GER)	Lotto–Soudal	3h 15' 21"
2	Wouter Wippert (NED)	Roompot–Nederlandse Loterij	+ 0"
3	Tim Merlier (BEL)	Vérandas Willems–Crelan	+ 0"
4	Timothy Dupont (BEL)	Wanty–Groupe Gobert	+ 0"
5	Bryan Coquard (FRA)	Vital Concept	+ 0"
6	Roy Jans (BEL)	Cibel–Cebon	+ 0"
7	Christophe Noppe (BEL)	Sport Vlaanderen–Baloise	+ 0"
8	Bram Welten (NED)	Fortuneo–Samsic	+ 0"
9	Sean De Bie (BEL)	Vérandas Willems–Crelan	+ 0"
10	Riccardo Minali (ITA)	Astana	+ 0"

General classification after Stage 2
Rank	Rider	Team	Time
1	André Greipel (GER)	Lotto–Soudal	7h 09' 30"
2	Lasse Norman Hansen (DEN)	Aqua Blue Sport	+ 11"
3	Tim Merlier (BEL)	Vérandas Willems–Crelan	+ 12"
4	Wouter Wippert (NED)	Roompot–Nederlandse Loterij	+ 14"
5	Riccardo Minali (ITA)	Astana	+ 14"
6	Michael Boroš (CZE)	Pauwels Sauzen–Vastgoedservice	+ 15"
7	Aimé De Gendt (BEL)	Sport Vlaanderen–Baloise	+ 15"
8	Sean De Bie (BEL)	Vérandas Willems–Crelan	+ 16"
9	Antoine Warnier (BEL)	WB Aqua Protect Veranclassic	+ 16"
10	Conor Dunne (IRL)	Aqua Blue Sport	+ 16"

=== Stage 3 ===
25 May 2018 — Bornem to Bornem, 10.6 km (6.6 mi), individual time trial (ITT)

Result of Stage 3
Rank	Rider	Team	Time
1	Christophe Laporte (FRA)	Cofidis	12' 38"
2	Andriy Hrivko (UKR)	Astana	+ 5"
3	Brian van Goethem (NED)	Roompot–Nederlandse Loterij	+ 7"
4	Jens Keukeleire (BEL)	Lotto–Soudal	+ 10"
5	Mark Christian (GBR)	Aqua Blue Sport	+ 10"
6	Marco Mathis (GER)	Team Katusha–Alpecin	+ 10"
7	Quinten Hermans (BEL)	Telenet–Fidea Lions	+ 15"
8	Sean De Bie (BEL)	Vérandas Willems–Crelan	+ 16"
9	Peter Koning (NED)	Aqua Blue Sport	+ 18"
10	Lasse Norman Hansen (DEN)	Aqua Blue Sport	+ 18"

General classification after Stage 3
Rank	Rider	Team	Time
1	Christophe Laporte (FRA)	Cofidis	7h 22' 28"
2	André Greipel (GER)	Lotto–Soudal	+ 4"
3	Andriy Hrivko (UKR)	Astana	+ 5"
4	Brian van Goethem (NED)	Roompot–Nederlandse Loterij	+ 7"
5	Jens Keukeleire (BEL)	Lotto–Soudal	+ 9"
6	Lasse Norman Hansen (DEN)	Aqua Blue Sport	+ 9"
7	Mark Christian (GBR)	Aqua Blue Sport	+ 10"
8	Sean De Bie (BEL)	Vérandas Willems–Crelan	+ 12"
9	Quinten Hermans (BEL)	Telenet–Fidea Lions	+ 15"
10	Peter Koning (NED)	Aqua Blue Sport	+ 18"

=== Stage 4 ===
26 May 2018 — Wanze to Wanze, 151.4 km (94.1 mi)

Result of Stage 4
Rank	Rider	Team	Time
1	Jelle Vanendert (BEL)	Lotto–Soudal	3h 33' 24"
2	Jens Keukeleire (BEL)	Lotto–Soudal	+ 16"
3	Dion Smith (NZL)	Wanty–Groupe Gobert	+ 16"
4	Anthony Turgis (FRA)	Cofidis	+ 16"
5	Eddie Dunbar (IRL)	Aqua Blue Sport	+ 20"
6	Andriy Hrivko (UKR)	Astana	+ 1' 09"
7	Gianni Marchand (BEL)	Cibel–Cebon	+ 1' 09"
8	Jenthe Biermans (BEL)	Team Katusha–Alpecin	+ 1' 53"
9	Martijn Budding (NED)	Roompot–Nederlandse Loterij	+ 1' 53"
10	Quinten Hermans (BEL)	Telenet–Fidea Lions	+ 1' 53"

General classification after Stage 4
Rank	Rider	Team	Time
1	Jens Keukeleire (BEL)	Lotto–Soudal	10h 56' 11"
2	Jelle Vanendert (BEL)	Lotto–Soudal	+ 15"
3	Anthony Turgis (FRA)	Cofidis	+ 26"
4	Dion Smith (NZL)	Wanty–Groupe Gobert	+ 39"
5	Eddie Dunbar (IRL)	Aqua Blue Sport	+ 45"
6	Andriy Hrivko (UKR)	Astana	+ 55"
7	Gianni Marchand (BEL)	Cibel–Cebon	+ 1' 16"
8	Quinten Hermans (BEL)	Telenet–Fidea Lions	+ 1' 49"
9	Jenthe Biermans (BEL)	Team Katusha–Alpecin	+ 1' 53"
10	Bryan Coquard (FRA)	Vital Concept	+ 1' 58"

=== Stage 5 ===
27 May 2018 — Landen to Tongeren, 157.7 km (98.0 mi)

Result of Stage 5
Rank	Rider	Team	Time
1	Bryan Coquard (FRA)	Vital Concept	3h 47' 26"
2	Christophe Laporte (FRA)	Cofidis	+ 0"
3	Roy Jans (BEL)	Cibel–Cebon	+ 0"
4	Bram Welten (NED)	Fortuneo–Samsic	+ 0"
5	Kenny Dehaes (BEL)	WB Aqua Protect Veranclassic	+ 0"
6	Christophe Noppe (BEL)	Sport Vlaanderen–Baloise	+ 0"
7	Timothy Dupont (BEL)	Wanty–Groupe Gobert	+ 0"
8	André Greipel (GER)	Lotto–Soudal	+ 0"
9	Jelle Mannaerts (BEL)	Tarteletto–Isorex	+ 0"
10	Riccardo Minali (ITA)	Astana	+ 0"

Final general classification
Rank	Rider	Team	Time
1	Jens Keukeleire (BEL)	Lotto–Soudal	14h 43' 37"
2	Jelle Vanendert (BEL)	Lotto–Soudal	+ 15"
3	Dion Smith (NZL)	Wanty–Groupe Gobert	+ 39"
4	Eddie Dunbar (IRL)	Aqua Blue Sport	+ 45"
5	Andriy Hrivko (UKR)	Astana	+ 55"
6	Gianni Marchand (BEL)	Cibel–Cebon	+ 1' 16"
7	Bryan Coquard (FRA)	Vital Concept	+ 1' 48"
8	Quinten Hermans (BEL)	Telenet–Fidea Lions	+ 1' 49"
9	Jenthe Biermans (BEL)	Team Katusha–Alpecin	+ 1' 53"
10	Martijn Budding (NED)	Roompot–Nederlandse Loterij	+ 2' 50"

== Classification leadership table ==
In the 2018 Tour of Belgium, three different jerseys were awarded. The general classification was calculated by adding each cyclist's finishing times on each stage. Time bonuses were awarded to the first three finishers on all stages: the stage winner won a ten-second bonus, with six and four seconds for the second and third riders respectively. Bonus seconds were also awarded to the first three riders at sprints in the "golden kilometre", where three intermediate sprint positions were held within the space of a kilometre. Three seconds were awarded for the winner of the sprint, two seconds for the rider in second and one second for the rider in third. The leader of the general classification received a blue jersey. This classification was considered the most important of the 2018 Tour of Belgium, and the winner of the classification was considered the winner of the race.

Points for the points classification
Position	1	2	3	4	5	6	7	8	9	10
Points awarded	30	25	22	19	17	15	13	12	11	10

The second classification was the points classification. Riders were awarded points for finishing in the top ten in a stage. Unlike in the points classification in the Tour de France, the winners of all stages were awarded the same number of points. The leader of the points classification was awarded a red jersey. There was also a combativity classification, where riders received points for finishing in the top five at intermediate sprint points during each stage, on a 10–8–6–4–2 scale. Bonus points were awarded if a breakaway had gained a sufficient advantage over the field, up to a maximum of 5 points. There was also a classification for teams, in which the times of the best three cyclists in a team on each stage were added together; the leading team at the end of the race was the team with the lowest cumulative time.

Stage	Winner	General classification (Dutch: Algemeenklassement)	Points classification (Dutch: Puntenklassement)	Combativity classification (Dutch: Strijdlustklassement)	Teams classification (Dutch: Ploegenklassement)
1	André Greipel	André Greipel	André Greipel	Aimé De Gendt	Roompot–Nederlandse Loterij
2	André Greipel	André Greipel	André Greipel	Aimé De Gendt	Vérandas Willems–Crelan
3	Christophe Laporte	Christophe Laporte	André Greipel	Aimé De Gendt	Aqua Blue Sport
4	Jelle Vanendert	Jens Keukeleire	André Greipel	Thomas Sprengers	Lotto–Soudal
5	Bryan Coquard	Jens Keukeleire	André Greipel	Thomas Sprengers	Lotto–Soudal
Final		Jens Keukeleire	André Greipel	Thomas Sprengers	Lotto–Soudal
