= 2017 Tour of Belgium =

2017 UCI Europe Tour

Race details
- Dates: 24–28 May
- Stages: 5
- Distance: 728.6 km (452.7 mi)
- Winning time: 16h 59' 42"

Results
Jersey awarded to the overall winner	Winner	Jens Keukeleire (BEL)	(Belgium (national team))
	Second	Rémi Cavagna (FRA)	(Quick-Step Floors)
	Third	Tony Martin (GER)	(Team Katusha–Alpecin)
Jersey awarded to the points classification winner	Points	Jens Debusschere (BEL)	(Lotto–Soudal)
Jersey awarded to the combativity classification winner	Combativity	Kenneth Vanbilsen (BEL)	(Cofidis)
	Team	Quick-Step Floors	

The 2017 Tour of Belgium, known as the 2017 Baloise Belgium Tour for sponsorship purposes, was the 87th edition of the Tour of Belgium cycling stage race. It took place from 24 to 28 May 2017 in Belgium, as part of the 2017 UCI Europe Tour; it was categorised as a 2.HC race. Defending champion Dries Devenyns (Quick-Step Floors) did not take part in the race, as he was taking part in the concurrent Giro d'Italia.

The race was won by Jens Keukeleire, riding for the Belgium national team. Keukeleire trailed overnight leader Rémi Cavagna (Quick-Step Floors) by a second going into the final stage, but bonus seconds gained in the race's "golden kilometre" – where three intermediate sprint positions were held within the space of a kilometre – allowed Keukeleire to move into the lead on the road, and despite crashing in the final three kilometres, he was able to win the race by six seconds from Cavagna. Three-time race winner Tony Martin of Team Katusha–Alpecin completed the podium, five seconds further behind Cavagna.

In the race's other classifications, Jens Debusschere (Lotto–Soudal) won the points classification, the combativity classification was won by Cofidis rider Kenneth Vanbilsen, while the teams classification was taken by Quick-Step Floors, after placing three riders in the top five places overall.

== Teams ==
20 teams were selected to take part in Tour of Belgium. Five of these were UCI WorldTeams, with ten UCI Professional Continental teams, four UCI Continental teams and a Belgium national team.

UCI WorldTeams

- Astana
- Team Katusha–Alpecin
- Lotto–Soudal
- Quick-Step Floors
- Trek–Segafredo

UCI Professional Continental teams

- Aqua Blue Sport
- Cofidis
- Direct Énergie
- Nippo–Vini Fantini
- Roompot–Nederlandse Loterij
- Sport Vlaanderen–Baloise
- Vérandas Willems–Crelan
- Wanty–Groupe Gobert
- WB Veranclassic Aqua Protect
- Fortuneo–Vital Concept

UCI Continental teams

- Beobank–Corendon
- Cibel–Cebon
- Pauwels Sauzen–Vastgoedservice
- Telenet–Fidea Lions

National teams

- Belgium

== Schedule ==
The race itinerary was announced on 23 February 2017.

Stage	Date	Course	Distance	Type	Winner
1	24 May	Lochristi to Knokke-Heist	178.8 km (111.1 mi)	Flat stage	Bryan Coquard (FRA)
2	25 May	Knokke-Heist to Moorslede	199.0 km (123.7 mi)	Flat stage	Mathieu van der Poel (NED)
3	26 May	Beveren to Beveren	13.4 km (8.3 mi)	Individual time trial	Matthias Brändle (AUT)
4	27 May	Ans to Ans	167.8 km (104.3 mi)	Intermediate stage	Maurits Lammertink (NED)
5	28 May	Tienen to Tongeren	169.6 km (105.4 mi)	Flat stage	Jens Debusschere (BEL)
Total		728.6 km (452.7 mi)			

== Stages ==
=== Stage 1 ===
24 May 2017 — Lochristi to Knokke-Heist, 178.8 km (111.1 mi)

Result of Stage 1
Rank	Rider	Team	Time
1	Bryan Coquard (FRA)	Direct Énergie	4h 08' 58"
2	Jens Debusschere (BEL)	Lotto–Soudal	+ 0"
3	Daniel McLay (GBR)	Fortuneo–Vital Concept	+ 0"
4	Tom Van Asbroeck (BEL)	Belgium (national team)	+ 0"
5	Roy Jans (BEL)	WB Veranclassic Aqua Protect	+ 0"
6	Bert Van Lerberghe (BEL)	Sport Vlaanderen–Baloise	+ 0"
7	Baptiste Planckaert (BEL)	Team Katusha–Alpecin	+ 0"
8	Michael Van Staeyen (BEL)	Cofidis	+ 0"
9	Kenny Dehaes (BEL)	Wanty–Groupe Gobert	+ 0"
10	Nicolas Marini (ITA)	Nippo–Vini Fantini	+ 0"

General classification after Stage 1
Rank	Rider	Team	Time
1	Bryan Coquard (FRA)	Direct Énergie	4h 08' 48"
2	Lasse Norman Hansen (DEN)	Aqua Blue Sport	+ 1"
3	Jens Debusschere (BEL)	Lotto–Soudal	+ 4"
4	Daniel McLay (GBR)	Fortuneo–Vital Concept	+ 6"
5	Pieter Vanspeybrouck (BEL)	Wanty–Groupe Gobert	+ 6"
6	Oliver Naesen (BEL)	Belgium (national team)	+ 8"
7	Philippe Gilbert (BEL)	Quick-Step Floors	+ 8"
8	Élie Gesbert (FRA)	Fortuneo–Vital Concept	+ 9"
9	Tom Van Asbroeck (BEL)	Belgium (national team)	+ 10"
10	Roy Jans (BEL)	WB Veranclassic Aqua Protect	+ 10"

=== Stage 2 ===
25 May 2017 — Knokke-Heist to Moorslede, 199 km (124 mi)

Result of Stage 2
Rank	Rider	Team	Time
1	Mathieu van der Poel (NED)	Beobank–Corendon	4h 43' 12"
2	Philippe Gilbert (BEL)	Quick-Step Floors	+ 0"
3	Wout van Aert (BEL)	Vérandas Willems–Crelan	+ 0"
4	Oliver Naesen (BEL)	Belgium (national team)	+ 0"
5	Olivier Pardini (BEL)	WB Veranclassic Aqua Protect	+ 0"
6	Florian Sénéchal (FRA)	Cofidis	+ 0"
7	Tiesj Benoot (BEL)	Lotto–Soudal	+ 0"
8	Tony Martin (GER)	Team Katusha–Alpecin	+ 3"
9	Julien Vermote (BEL)	Quick-Step Floors	+ 3"
10	Maarten Wynants (BEL)	Belgium (national team)	+ 5"

General classification after Stage 2
Rank	Rider	Team	Time
1	Philippe Gilbert (BEL)	Quick-Step Floors	8h 51' 57"
2	Wout van Aert (BEL)	Vérandas Willems–Crelan	+ 6"
3	Oliver Naesen (BEL)	Belgium (national team)	+ 8"
4	Florian Sénéchal (FRA)	Cofidis	+ 12"
5	Olivier Pardini (BEL)	WB Veranclassic Aqua Protect	+ 13"
6	Tiesj Benoot (BEL)	Lotto–Soudal	+ 13"
7	Jelle Vanendert (BEL)	Lotto–Soudal	+ 15"
8	Tony Martin (GER)	Team Katusha–Alpecin	+ 16"
9	Julien Vermote (BEL)	Quick-Step Floors	+ 16"
10	Maarten Wynants (BEL)	Belgium (national team)	+ 18"

=== Stage 3 ===
26 May 2017 — Beveren to Beveren, 13.4 km (8.3 mi), individual time trial (ITT)

Result of Stage 3
Rank	Rider	Team	Time
1	Matthias Brändle (AUT)	Trek–Segafredo	15' 40"
2	Tony Martin (GER)	Team Katusha–Alpecin	+ 14"
3	Wout van Aert (BEL)	Vérandas Willems–Crelan	+ 14"
4	Sylvain Chavanel (FRA)	Direct Énergie	+ 14"
5	Rémi Cavagna (FRA)	Quick-Step Floors	+ 21"
6	Lasse Norman Hansen (DEN)	Aqua Blue Sport	+ 22"
7	Yves Lampaert (BEL)	Quick-Step Floors	+ 30"
8	Anthony Turgis (FRA)	Cofidis	+ 33"
9	Jens Keukeleire (BEL)	Belgium (national team)	+ 34"
10	Simon Špilak (SLO)	Team Katusha–Alpecin	+ 38"

General classification after Stage 3
Rank	Rider	Team	Time
1	Wout van Aert (BEL)	Vérandas Willems–Crelan	9h 07' 57"
2	Tony Martin (GER)	Team Katusha–Alpecin	+ 10"
3	Matthias Brändle (AUT)	Trek–Segafredo	+ 11"
4	Philippe Gilbert (BEL)	Quick-Step Floors	+ 19"
5	Lasse Norman Hansen (DEN)	Aqua Blue Sport	+ 24"
6	Sylvain Chavanel (FRA)	Direct Énergie	+ 25"
7	Rémi Cavagna (FRA)	Quick-Step Floors	+ 32"
8	Olivier Pardini (BEL)	WB Veranclassic Aqua Protect	+ 35"
9	Julien Vermote (BEL)	Quick-Step Floors	+ 39"
10	Tiesj Benoot (BEL)	Lotto–Soudal	+ 40"

=== Stage 4 ===
27 May 2017 — Ans to Ans, 167.8 km (104.3 mi)

Result of Stage 4
Rank	Rider	Team	Time
1	Maurits Lammertink (NED)	Team Katusha–Alpecin	4h 09' 50"
2	Ruben Guerreiro (POR)	Trek–Segafredo	+ 0"
3	Jens Keukeleire (BEL)	Belgium (national team)	+ 5"
4	Rémi Cavagna (FRA)	Quick-Step Floors	+ 5"
5	Jan Bakelants (BEL)	Belgium (national team)	+ 31"
6	Julien Vermote (BEL)	Quick-Step Floors	+ 31"
7	Oliver Naesen (BEL)	Belgium (national team)	+ 31"
8	Tiesj Benoot (BEL)	Lotto–Soudal	+ 31"
9	Tony Martin (GER)	Team Katusha–Alpecin	+ 31"
10	Philippe Gilbert (BEL)	Quick-Step Floors	+ 31"

General classification after Stage 4
Rank	Rider	Team	Time
1	Rémi Cavagna (FRA)	Quick-Step Floors	13h 18' 23"
2	Jens Keukeleire (BEL)	Belgium (national team)	+ 1"
3	Tony Martin (GER)	Team Katusha–Alpecin	+ 5"
4	Philippe Gilbert (BEL)	Quick-Step Floors	+ 14"
5	Julien Vermote (BEL)	Quick-Step Floors	+ 34"
6	Maurits Lammertink (NED)	Team Katusha–Alpecin	+ 34"
7	Tiesj Benoot (BEL)	Lotto–Soudal	+ 35"
8	Oliver Naesen (BEL)	Belgium (national team)	+ 36"
9	Ruben Guerreiro (POR)	Trek–Segafredo	+ 46"
10	Wout van Aert (BEL)	Vérandas Willems–Crelan	+ 52"

=== Stage 5 ===
28 May 2017 — Tienen to Tongeren, 169.6 km (105.4 mi)

Result of Stage 5
Rank	Rider	Team	Time
1	Jens Debusschere (BEL)	Lotto–Soudal	3h 41' 25"
2	Coen Vermeltfoort (NED)	Roompot–Nederlandse Loterij	+ 0"
3	Boy van Poppel (NED)	Trek–Segafredo	+ 0"
4	Baptiste Planckaert (BEL)	Team Katusha–Alpecin	+ 0"
5	Kenny Dehaes (BEL)	Wanty–Groupe Gobert	+ 0"
6	Aaron Gate (NZL)	Aqua Blue Sport	+ 0"
7	Bert Van Lerberghe (BEL)	Sport Vlaanderen–Baloise	+ 0"
8	Jürgen Roelandts (BEL)	Lotto–Soudal	+ 0"
9	Michael Van Staeyen (BEL)	Cofidis	+ 0"
10	Joeri Stallaert (BEL)	Cibel–Cebon	+ 0"

Final general classification
Rank	Rider	Team	Time
1	Jens Keukeleire (BEL)	Belgium (national team)	16h 59' 42"
2	Rémi Cavagna (FRA)	Quick-Step Floors	+ 6"
3	Tony Martin (GER)	Team Katusha–Alpecin	+ 11"
4	Philippe Gilbert (BEL)	Quick-Step Floors	+ 12"
5	Julien Vermote (BEL)	Quick-Step Floors	+ 38"
6	Maurits Lammertink (NED)	Team Katusha–Alpecin	+ 40"
7	Tiesj Benoot (BEL)	Lotto–Soudal	+ 40"
8	Oliver Naesen (BEL)	Belgium (national team)	+ 42"
9	Ruben Guerreiro (POR)	Trek–Segafredo	+ 52"
10	Wout van Aert (BEL)	Vérandas Willems–Crelan	+ 58"

== Classification leadership table ==
In the 2017 Tour of Belgium, three different jerseys were awarded. The general classification was calculated by adding each cyclist's finishing times on each stage. Time bonuses were awarded to the first three finishers on all stages: the stage winner won a ten-second bonus, with six and four seconds for the second and third riders respectively. Bonus seconds were also awarded to the first three riders at sprints in the "golden kilometre", where three intermediate sprint positions were held within the space of a kilometre. Three seconds were awarded for the winner of the sprint, two seconds for the rider in second and one second for the rider in third. The leader of the general classification received a red jersey. This classification was considered the most important of the 2017 Tour of Belgium, and the winner of the classification was considered the winner of the race.

Points for the points classification
Position	1	2	3	4	5	6	7	8	9	10
Points awarded	30	25	22	19	17	15	13	12	11	10

The second classification was the points classification. Riders were awarded points for finishing in the top ten in a stage. Unlike in the points classification in the Tour de France, the winners of all stages were awarded the same number of points. The leader of the points classification was awarded a blue jersey. There was also a combativity classification, where riders received points for finishing in the top five at intermediate sprint points during each stage, on a 10–8–6–4–2 scale. Bonus points were awarded if a breakaway had gained a sufficient advantage over the field, up to a maximum of 5 points. There was also a classification for teams, in which the times of the best three cyclists in a team on each stage were added together; the leading team at the end of the race was the team with the lowest cumulative time.

Stage	Winner	General classification (Dutch: Algemeenklassement)	Points classification (Dutch: Puntenklassement)	Combativity classification (Dutch: Strijdlustklassement)	Teams classification (Dutch: Ploegenklassement)
1	Bryan Coquard	Bryan Coquard	Bryan Coquard	Kenneth Vanbilsen	Sport Vlaanderen–Baloise
2	Mathieu van der Poel	Philippe Gilbert	Bryan Coquard	Kenneth Vanbilsen	Quick-Step Floors
3	Matthias Brändle	Wout van Aert	Wout van Aert	Kenneth Vanbilsen	Quick-Step Floors
4	Maurits Lammertink	Rémi Cavagna	Tony Martin	Kenneth Vanbilsen	Quick-Step Floors
5	Jens Debusschere	Jens Keukeleire	Jens Debusschere	Kenneth Vanbilsen	Quick-Step Floors
Final		Jens Keukeleire	Jens Debusschere	Kenneth Vanbilsen	Quick-Step Floors

== Final standings ==
Legend
Red jersey	Denotes the leader of the General classification
Blue jersey	Denotes the leader of the Points classification
Green jersey	Denotes the leader of the Combativity classification

=== General classification ===
Result
Rank	Rider	Team	Time
1	Jens Keukeleire (BEL)	Belgium (national team)	16h 59' 42"
2	Rémi Cavagna (FRA)	Quick-Step Floors	+ 6"
3	Tony Martin (GER)	Team Katusha–Alpecin	+ 11"
4	Philippe Gilbert (BEL)	Quick-Step Floors	+ 12"
5	Julien Vermote (BEL)	Quick-Step Floors	+ 38"
6	Maurits Lammertink (NED)	Team Katusha–Alpecin	+ 40"
7	Tiesj Benoot (BEL)	Lotto–Soudal	+ 40"
8	Oliver Naesen (BEL)	Belgium (national team)	+ 42"
9	Ruben Guerreiro (POR)	Trek–Segafredo	+ 52"
10	Wout van Aert (BEL)	Vérandas Willems–Crelan	+ 58"

=== Points classification ===
Result
Rank	Rider	Team	Points
1	Jens Debusschere (BEL)	Lotto–Soudal	55
2	Tony Martin (GER)	Team Katusha–Alpecin	41
3	Wout van Aert (BEL)	Vérandas Willems–Crelan	38
4	Philippe Gilbert (BEL)	Quick-Step Floors	35
5	Oliver Naesen (BEL)	Belgium (national team)	32
6	Baptiste Planckaert (BEL)	Team Katusha–Alpecin	32
7	Rémi Cavagna (FRA)	Quick-Step Floors	31
8	Maurits Lammertink (NED)	Team Katusha–Alpecin	30
9	Bryan Coquard (FRA)	Direct Énergie	30
10	Jens Keukeleire (BEL)	Belgium (national team)	29

=== Combativity classification ===
Result
Rank	Rider	Team	Points
1	Kenneth Vanbilsen (BEL)	Cofidis	50
2	Brian van Goethem (NED)	Roompot–Nederlandse Loterij	36
3	Philipp Walsleben (GER)	Beobank–Corendon	24
4	Benjamin Declercq (BEL)	Sport Vlaanderen–Baloise	23
5	Lasse Norman Hansen (DEN)	Aqua Blue Sport	21
6	Jens Keukeleire (BEL)	Belgium (national team)	21
7	Rob Leemans (BEL)	Pauwels Sauzen–Vastgoedservice	19
8	Philippe Gilbert (BEL)	Quick-Step Floors	18
9	Ludwig De Winter (BEL)	WB Veranclassic Aqua Protect	17
10	Taco van der Hoorn (NED)	Roompot–Nederlandse Loterij	17

=== Teams classification ===
Result
Rank	Team	Time
1	Quick-Step Floors	51h 00' 13"
2	Belgium (national team)	+ 1' 02"
3	Team Katusha–Alpecin	+ 1' 17"
4	Aqua Blue Sport	+ 3' 55"
5	Cibel–Cebon	+ 5' 39"
6	Roompot–Nederlandse Loterij	+ 8' 09"
7	WB Veranclassic Aqua Protect	+ 9' 31"
8	Trek–Segafredo	+ 10' 30"
9	Wanty–Groupe Gobert	+ 10' 43"
10	Lotto–Soudal	+ 11' 46"
