= 2018 Tour of Croatia =

2018 UCI Europe Tour

Race details
- Dates: 17–22 April 2018
- Stages: 6
- Distance: 1,074.5 km (667.7 mi)
- Winning time: 26h 51' 12"

Results
Jersey awarded to the overall winner	Winner	Kanstantsin Sivtsov (BLR)	(Bahrain–Merida)
	Second	Pieter Weening (NED)	(Roompot–Nederlandse Loterij)
	Third	Yevgeniy Gidich (KAZ)	(Astana)
Jersey awarded to the points classification winner	Points	Eduard-Michael Grosu (ROU)	(Nippo–Vini Fantini–Europa Ovini)
Jersey awarded to the mountains classification winner	Mountains	Peter Koning (NED)	(Aqua Blue Sport)
Jersey awarded to the young rider classification winner	Young rider	Yevgeniy Gidich (KAZ)	(Astana)
	Team	Bahrain–Merida	

The 2018 Tour of Croatia was a road cycling stage race that took place in Croatia between 17 and 22 April 2018. It was the fourth edition of the Tour of Croatia since its revival in 2015, and was rated as a 2.HC event as part of the 2018 UCI Europe Tour.

The race was won by Bahrain–Merida's Kanstantsin Sivtsov.

== Teams ==
Nineteen teams were invited to start the race. These included three UCI WorldTeams, 11 UCI Professional Continental teams and five UCI Continental teams.

UCI WorldTeams

- Astana
- Bahrain–Merida
- Trek–Segafredo

UCI Professional Continental teams

- Aqua Blue Sport
- Bardiani–CSF
- Caja Rural–Seguros RGA
- CCC–Sprandi–Polkowice
- Gazprom–RusVelo
- Holowesko Citadel p/b Arapahoe Resources
- Israel Cycling Academy
- Nippo–Vini Fantini–Europa Ovini
- Team Novo Nordisk
- Roompot–Nederlandse Loterij
- WB Aqua Protect Veranclassic

UCI Continental teams

- Adria Mobil
- Bicicletas Strongman–Colombia Coldeportes
- Ljubljana Gusto Xaurum
- Meridiana–Kamen
- MsTina–Focus

== Schedule ==
Stage schedule
Stage	Date	Route	Distance	Type	Winner
1	17 April	Osijek to Koprivnica	227 km (141.1 mi)	Hilly stage	Niccolò Bonifazio (ITA)
2	18 April	Karlovac to Zadar	234.5 km (145.7 mi)	Hilly stage	Eduard-Michael Grosu (ROU)
3	19 April	Trogir–Okrug to Sveti Jure–Biokovo	134 km (83.3 mi)	Mountain stage	Kanstantsin Sivtsov (BLR)
4	20 April	Starigrad to Crikvenica	171 km (106.3 mi)	Hilly stage	Alessandro Tonelli (ITA)
5	21 April	Rabac to Učka	156.5 km (97.2 mi)	Mountain stage	Manuele Boaro (ITA)
6	22 April	Samobor to Zagreb	151.5 km (94.1 mi)	Flat stage	Paolo Simion (ITA)

== Stages ==
=== Stage 1 ===
17 April 2018 — Osijek to Koprivnica, 227 km (141.1 mi)

Result of Stage 1
Rank	Rider	Team	Time
1	Niccolò Bonifazio (ITA)	Bahrain–Merida	5h 45' 25"
2	Andrea Guardini (ITA)	Bardiani–CSF	+ 0"
3	Eduard-Michael Grosu (ROU)	Nippo–Vini Fantini–Europa Ovini	+ 0"
4	Riccardo Minali (ITA)	Astana	+ 0"
5	Giacomo Nizzolo (ITA)	Trek–Segafredo	+ 0"
6	Marko Kump (SLO)	CCC–Sprandi–Polkowice	+ 0"
7	John Murphy (USA)	Holowesko Citadel p/b Arapahoe Resources	+ 0"
8	Žiga Jerman (SLO)	Ljubljana Gusto Xaurum	+ 0"
9	Federico Zurlo (ITA)	MsTina–Focus	+ 0"
10	Jimmy Duquennoy (BEL)	WB Aqua Protect Veranclassic	+ 0"

General classification after Stage 1
Rank	Rider	Team	Time
1	Niccolò Bonifazio (ITA)	Bahrain–Merida	5h 45' 15"
2	Jon Božič (SLO)	Adria Mobil	+ 1"
3	Andrea Guardini (ITA)	Bardiani–CSF	+ 4"
4	Eduard-Michael Grosu (ROU)	Nippo–Vini Fantini–Europa Ovini	+ 6"
5	Riccardo Minali (ITA)	Astana	+ 10"
6	Giacomo Nizzolo (ITA)	Trek–Segafredo	+ 10"
7	Marko Kump (SLO)	CCC–Sprandi–Polkowice	+ 10"
8	John Murphy (USA)	Holowesko Citadel p/b Arapahoe Resources	+ 10"
9	Žiga Jerman (SLO)	Ljubljana Gusto Xaurum	+ 10"
10	Federico Zurlo (ITA)	MsTina–Focus	+ 10"

=== Stage 2 ===
18 April 2018 — Karlovac to Zadar, 234.5 km (145.7 mi)

Result of Stage 2
Rank	Rider	Team	Time
1	Eduard-Michael Grosu (ROU)	Nippo–Vini Fantini–Europa Ovini	5h 38' 11"
2	Giacomo Nizzolo (ITA)	Trek–Segafredo	+ 0"
3	Riccardo Minali (ITA)	Astana	+ 0"
4	Yevgeniy Gidich (KAZ)	Astana	+ 4"
5	Juan José Lobato (ESP)	Nippo–Vini Fantini–Europa Ovini	+ 4"
6	Josip Rumac (CRO)	Meridiana–Kamen	+ 4"
7	Žiga Jerman (SLO)	Ljubljana Gusto Xaurum	+ 4"
8	Matej Mohorič (SLO)	Bahrain–Merida	+ 4"
9	Andrea Guardini (ITA)	Bardiani–CSF	+ 4"
10	Marko Kump (SLO)	CCC–Sprandi–Polkowice	+ 8"

General classification after Stage 2
Rank	Rider	Team	Time
1	Eduard-Michael Grosu (ROU)	Nippo–Vini Fantini–Europa Ovini	11h 23' 22"
2	Giacomo Nizzolo (ITA)	Trek–Segafredo	+ 8"
3	Riccardo Minali (ITA)	Astana	+ 10"
4	Andrea Guardini (ITA)	Bardiani–CSF	+ 12"
5	Jon Božič (SLO)	Adria Mobil	+ 12"
6	Riccardo Stacchiotti (ITA)	MsTina–Focus	+ 17"
7	Žiga Jerman (SLO)	Ljubljana Gusto Xaurum	+ 18"
8	Matej Mohorič (SLO)	Bahrain–Merida	+ 18"
9	Josip Rumac (CRO)	Meridiana–Kamen	+ 18"
10	Yevgeniy Gidich (KAZ)	Astana	+ 18"

=== Stage 3 ===
19 April 2018 — Trogir–Okrug to Sveti Jure–Biokovo, 134 km (83.3 mi)

Result of Stage 3
Rank	Rider	Team	Time
1	Kanstantsin Sivtsov (BLR)	Bahrain–Merida	3h 51' 32"
2	Pieter Weening (NED)	Roompot–Nederlandse Loterij	+ 4"
3	Yevgeniy Gidich (KAZ)	Astana	+ 49"
4	Radoslav Rogina (CRO)	Adria Mobil	+ 56"
5	Niklas Eg (DEN)	Trek–Segafredo	+ 1' 38"
6	Daniel Pearson (GBR)	Aqua Blue Sport	+ 2' 01"
7	Gianluca Brambilla (ITA)	Trek–Segafredo	+ 2' 27"
8	Rubén Acosta (COL)	Bicicletas Strongman–Colombia Coldeportes	+ 2' 42"
9	Artem Nych (RUS)	Gazprom–RusVelo	+ 2' 51"
10	Jonathan Lastra (ESP)	Caja Rural–Seguros RGA	+ 3' 42"

General classification after Stage 3
Rank	Rider	Team	Time
1	Kanstantsin Sivtsov (BLR)	Bahrain–Merida	15h 15' 10"
2	Pieter Weening (NED)	Roompot–Nederlandse Loterij	+ 8"
3	Yevgeniy Gidich (KAZ)	Astana	+ 47"
4	Radoslav Rogina (CRO)	Adria Mobil	+ 1' 06"
5	Niklas Eg (DEN)	Trek–Segafredo	+ 1' 48"
6	Daniel Pearson (GBR)	Aqua Blue Sport	+ 2' 11"
7	Gianluca Brambilla (ITA)	Trek–Segafredo	+ 2' 33"
8	Rubén Acosta (COL)	Bicicletas Strongman–Colombia Coldeportes	+ 2' 52"
9	Artem Nych (RUS)	Gazprom–RusVelo	+ 3' 01"
10	Jonathan Lastra (ESP)	Caja Rural–Seguros RGA	+ 3' 48"

=== Stage 4 ===
20 April 2018 — Starigrad to Crikvenica, 171 km (106.3 mi)

Result of Stage 4
Rank	Rider	Team	Time
1	Alessandro Tonelli (ITA)	Bardiani–CSF	3h 56' 57"
2	Enrico Barbin (ITA)	Bardiani–CSF	+ 12"
3	Jan Tratnik (SLO)	CCC–Sprandi–Polkowice	+ 12"
4	Fabian Lienhard (SUI)	Holowesko Citadel p/b Arapahoe Resources	+ 12"
5	Niccolò Bonifazio (ITA)	Bahrain–Merida	+ 12"
6	Žiga Ručigaj (SLO)	Ljubljana Gusto Xaurum	+ 12"
7	Federico Zurlo (ITA)	MsTina–Focus	+ 12"
8	Adrian Kurek (POL)	CCC–Sprandi–Polkowice	+ 12"
9	Jonathan Lastra (ESP)	Caja Rural–Seguros RGA	+ 12"
10	Kristian Sbaragli (ITA)	Israel Cycling Academy	+ 12"

General classification after Stage 4
Rank	Rider	Team	Time
1	Kanstantsin Sivtsov (BLR)	Bahrain–Merida	19h 12' 19"
2	Pieter Weening (NED)	Roompot–Nederlandse Loterij	+ 8"
3	Yevgeniy Gidich (KAZ)	Astana	+ 47"
4	Radoslav Rogina (CRO)	Adria Mobil	+ 1' 06"
5	Niklas Eg (DEN)	Trek–Segafredo	+ 1' 48"
6	Daniel Pearson (GBR)	Aqua Blue Sport	+ 2' 11"
7	Gianluca Brambilla (ITA)	Trek–Segafredo	+ 2' 33"
8	Rubén Acosta (COL)	Bicicletas Strongman–Colombia Coldeportes	+ 2' 52"
9	Artem Nych (RUS)	Gazprom–RusVelo	+ 3' 01"
10	Jonathan Lastra (ESP)	Caja Rural–Seguros RGA	+ 3' 48"

=== Stage 5 ===
21 April 2018 — Rabac to Učka, 156.5 km (97.2 mi)

Result of Stage 5
Rank	Rider	Team	Time
1	Manuele Boaro (ITA)	Bahrain–Merida	4h 15' 54"
2	Łukasz Owsian (POL)	CCC–Sprandi–Polkowice	+ 7"
3	Alessandro Tonelli (ITA)	Bardiani–CSF	+ 10"
4	Jonathan Cañaveral (COL)	Bicicletas Strongman–Colombia Coldeportes	+ 12"
5	Tadej Pogačar (SLO)	Ljubljana Gusto Xaurum	+ 24"
6	Niklas Eg (DEN)	Trek–Segafredo	+ 24"
7	Daniel Pearson (GBR)	Aqua Blue Sport	+ 47"
8	Pieter Weening (NED)	Roompot–Nederlandse Loterij	+ 48"
9	Kanstantsin Sivtsov (BLR)	Bahrain–Merida	+ 48"
10	Nick van der Lijke (NED)	Roompot–Nederlandse Loterij	+ 52"

General classification after Stage 5
Rank	Rider	Team	Time
1	Kanstantsin Sivtsov (BLR)	Bahrain–Merida	23h 29' 01"
2	Pieter Weening (NED)	Roompot–Nederlandse Loterij	+ 8"
3	Yevgeniy Gidich (KAZ)	Astana	+ 53"
4	Radoslav Rogina (CRO)	Adria Mobil	+ 1' 15"
5	Niklas Eg (DEN)	Trek–Segafredo	+ 1' 24"
6	Daniel Pearson (GBR)	Aqua Blue Sport	+ 2' 10"
7	Rubén Acosta (COL)	Bicicletas Strongman–Colombia Coldeportes	+ 3' 01"
8	Artem Nych (RUS)	Gazprom–RusVelo	+ 3' 08"
9	Gianluca Brambilla (ITA)	Trek–Segafredo	+ 3' 37"
10	Domen Novak (SLO)	Bahrain–Merida	+ 4' 15"

=== Stage 6 ===
22 April 2018 — Samobor to Zagreb, 151.5 km (94.1 mi)

Result of Stage 6
Rank	Rider	Team	Time
1	Paolo Simion (ITA)	Bardiani–CSF	3h 21' 39"
2	Mirco Maestri (ITA)	Bardiani–CSF	+ 11"
3	Eduard-Michael Grosu (ROU)	Nippo–Vini Fantini–Europa Ovini	+ 25"
4	Fabian Lienhard (SUI)	Holowesko Citadel p/b Arapahoe Resources	+ 25"
5	Sondre Holst Enger (NOR)	Israel Cycling Academy	+ 28"
6	Alex Kirsch (LUX)	WB Aqua Protect Veranclassic	+ 28"
7	Matej Mohorič (SLO)	Bahrain–Merida	+ 28"
8	Juan José Lobato (ESP)	Nippo–Vini Fantini–Europa Ovini	+ 28"
9	Vincenzo Albanese (ITA)	Bardiani–CSF	+ 32"
10	Enrico Barbin (ITA)	Bardiani–CSF	+ 32"

Final general classification
Rank	Rider	Team	Time
1	Kanstantsin Sivtsov (BLR)	Bahrain–Merida	26h 51' 12"
2	Pieter Weening (NED)	Roompot–Nederlandse Loterij	+ 11"
3	Yevgeniy Gidich (KAZ)	Astana	+ 1' 01"
4	Radoslav Rogina (CRO)	Adria Mobil	+ 1' 18"
5	Niklas Eg (DEN)	Trek–Segafredo	+ 1' 27"
6	Daniel Pearson (GBR)	Aqua Blue Sport	+ 2' 19"
7	Artem Nych (RUS)	Gazprom–RusVelo	+ 3' 27"
8	Gianluca Brambilla (ITA)	Trek–Segafredo	+ 3' 37"
9	Jonathan Lastra (ESP)	Caja Rural–Seguros RGA	+ 4' 23"
10	Domen Novak (SLO)	Bahrain–Merida	+ 4' 38"

== Classification leadership table ==
In the 2018 Tour of Croatia, four different jerseys were awarded. The general classification was calculated by adding each cyclist's finishing times on each stage, and allowing time bonuses for the first three finishers at intermediate sprints (three seconds to first, two seconds to second and one second to third) and at the finish of mass-start stages; these were awarded to the first three finishers on all stages: the stage winner won a ten-second bonus, with six and four seconds for the second and third riders respectively. The leader of the classification received a red jersey; it was considered the most important of the 2018 Tour of Croatia, and the winner of the classification was considered the winner of the race.

Points for the mountains classification
Position	1	2	3	4	5	6	7	8
Points for Hors-category	20	15	10	8	6	4	3	2
Points for Category 1	12	8	6	4	2	0		
Points for Category 2	6	4	2	0				
Points for Category 3	3	2	1	0				

Additionally, there was a points classification, which awarded a blue jersey. In the points classification, cyclists received points for finishing in the top 15 in a stage. For winning a stage, a rider earned 25 points, with 20 for second, 16 for third, 14 for fourth, 12 for fifth, 10 for sixth and a point fewer per place down to 1 point for 15th place. Points towards the classification could also be accrued – awarded on a 5–3–1 scale – at intermediate sprint points during each stage; these intermediate sprints also offered bonus seconds towards the general classification as noted above.

There was also a mountains classification, the leadership of which was marked by a green jersey. In the mountains classification, points towards the classification were won by reaching the top of a climb before other cyclists. Each climb was categorised as either hors, first, second, or third-category, with more points available for the higher-categorised climbs. The fourth and final jersey represented the classification for young riders, marked by a white jersey. This was decided the same way as the general classification, but only riders born after 1 January 1996 were eligible to be ranked in the classification. There was also a classification for teams, in which the times of the best three cyclists per team on each stage were added together; the leading team at the end of the race was the team with the lowest total time.

Classification leadership by stage
Stage	Winner	General classification	Points classification	Mountains classification	Young rider classification	Team classification
1	Niccolò Bonifazio	Niccolò Bonifazio	Niccolò Bonifazio	Emil Dima	Jon Božič	Ljubljana Gusto Xaurum
2	Eduard-Michael Grosu	Eduard-Michael Grosu	Eduard-Michael Grosu	Peter Koning	Jon Božič	Astana
3	Kanstantsin Sivtsov	Kanstantsin Sivtsov	Eduard-Michael Grosu	Kanstantsin Sivtsov	Yevgeniy Gidich	Astana
4	Alessandro Tonelli	Kanstantsin Sivtsov	Eduard-Michael Grosu	Kanstantsin Sivtsov	Yevgeniy Gidich	Astana
5	Manuele Boaro	Kanstantsin Sivtsov	Alessandro Tonelli	Peter Koning	Yevgeniy Gidich	Bahrain–Merida
6	Paolo Simion	Kanstantsin Sivtsov	Eduard-Michael Grosu	Peter Koning	Yevgeniy Gidich	Bahrain–Merida
Final		Kanstantsin Sivtsov	Eduard-Michael Grosu	Peter Koning	Yevgeniy Gidich	Bahrain–Merida

== Final standings ==
Legend
Red jersey	Denotes the leader of the General classification
Blue jersey	Denotes the leader of the Points classification
Green jersey	Denotes the leader of the Mountains classification
White jersey	Denotes the leader of the Young rider classification

=== General classification ===
Result
Rank	Rider	Team	Time
1	Kanstantsin Sivtsov (BLR)	Bahrain–Merida	26h 51' 12"
2	Pieter Weening (NED)	Roompot–Nederlandse Loterij	+ 11"
3	Yevgeniy Gidich (KAZ)	Astana	+ 1' 01"
4	Radoslav Rogina (CRO)	Adria Mobil	+ 1' 18"
5	Niklas Eg (DEN)	Trek–Segafredo	+ 1' 27"
6	Daniel Pearson (GBR)	Aqua Blue Sport	+ 2' 19"
7	Artem Nych (RUS)	Gazprom–RusVelo	+ 3' 27"
8	Gianluca Brambilla (ITA)	Trek–Segafredo	+ 3' 37"
9	Jonathan Lastra (ESP)	Caja Rural–Seguros RGA	+ 4' 23"
10	Domen Novak (SLO)	Bahrain–Merida	+ 4' 38"

=== Points classification ===
Result
Rank	Rider	Team	Points
1	Eduard-Michael Grosu (ROU)	Nippo–Vini Fantini–Europa Ovini	67
2	Alessandro Tonelli (ITA)	Bardiani–CSF	47
3	Kanstantsin Sivtsov (BLR)	Bahrain–Merida	37
4	Niccolò Bonifazio (ITA)	Bahrain–Merida	37
5	Yevgeniy Gidich (KAZ)	Astana	35
6	Mirco Maestri (ITA)	Bardiani–CSF	34
7	Jon Božič (SLO)	Adria Mobil	33
8	Riccardo Minali (ITA)	Astana	33
9	Pieter Weening (NED)	Roompot–Nederlandse Loterij	30
10	Enrico Barbin (ITA)	Bardiani–CSF	29

=== Mountains classification ===
Result
Rank	Rider	Team	Points
1	Peter Koning (NED)	Aqua Blue Sport	35
2	Łukasz Owsian (POL)	CCC–Sprandi–Polkowice	26
3	Kanstantsin Sivtsov (BLR)	Bahrain–Merida	20
4	Manuele Boaro (ITA)	Bahrain–Merida	15
5	Alessandro Tonelli (ITA)	Bardiani–CSF	15
6	Pieter Weening (NED)	Roompot–Nederlandse Loterij	15
7	Jonathan Cañaveral (COL)	Bicicletas Strongman–Colombia Coldeportes	12
8	Jure Golčer (SLO)	Adria Mobil	12
9	Yevgeniy Gidich (KAZ)	Astana	10
10	Emil Dima (ROU)	MsTina–Focus	9

=== Young rider classification ===
Result
Rank	Rider	Team	Time
1	Yevgeniy Gidich (KAZ)	Astana	26h 52' 13"
2	Rubén Acosta (COL)	Bicicletas Strongman–Colombia Coldeportes	+ 3' 40"
3	Tadej Pogačar (SLO)	Ljubljana Gusto Xaurum	+ 4' 48"
4	Jonathan Cañaveral (COL)	Bicicletas Strongman–Colombia Coldeportes	+ 6' 01"
5	Daniel Savini (ITA)	Bardiani–CSF	+ 29' 17"
6	Vincenzo Albanese (ITA)	Bardiani–CSF	+ 39' 45"
7	Gorazd Per (SLO)	Adria Mobil	+ 45' 07"
8	Raul-Antonio Sinza (ROU)	MsTina–Focus	+ 48' 33"
9	Viktor Potočki (CRO)	Ljubljana Gusto Xaurum	+ 58' 11"
10	Izidor Penko (CRO)	Ljubljana Gusto Xaurum	+ 58' 40"

=== Teams classification ===
Result
Rank	Team	Time
1	Bahrain–Merida	80h 52' 22"
2	Bicicletas Strongman–Colombia Coldeportes	+ 5' 17"
3	Astana	+ 7' 39"
4	Adria Mobil	+ 16' 54"
5	Roompot–Nederlandse Loterij	+ 20' 01"
6	Bardiani–CSF	+ 20' 18"
7	Meridiana–Kamen	+ 22' 20"
8	Trek–Segafredo	+ 25' 51"
9	Caja Rural–Seguros RGA	+ 37' 44"
10	Ljubljana Gusto Xaurum	+ 43' 29"
