= 2022 International Tour of Hellas =

Cycling race

2022 UCI Europe Tour

Race details
- Dates: 27 April – 1 May 2022
- Stages: 5
- Distance: 858.6 km (533.5 mi)
- Winning time: 21h 13' 33"

Results
| Jersey awarded to the overall winner | Winner | Aaron Gate (NZL) | (Bolton Equities Black Spoke Pro Cycling) |
| | Second | Lennert Teugels (BEL) | (Tarteletto–Isorex) |
| | Third | Mark Stewart (GBR) | (Bolton Equities Black Spoke Pro Cycling) |
| Jersey awarded to the points classification winner | Points | Nils Broge (DEN) | (BHS–PL Beton Bornholm) |
| Jersey awarded to the mountains classification winner | Mountains | Embret Svestad-Bårdseng (NOR) | (Team Coop) |
| Jersey awarded to the young rider classification winner | Young rider | Jon Barrenetxea (ESP) | (Caja Rural–Seguros RGA) |
| | Team | Bingoal Pauwels Sauces WB | |

The 2022 International Tour of Hellas was a road cycling stage race held between 27 April and 1 May 2022 in Greece. It was the 18th edition of the Tour of Greece. The race returned after a 10 year absence from the sport.

== Teams ==
One UCI WorldTeams, five UCI ProTeams, twelve UCI Continental and two National teams participated in the race. The peloton consisted of 133 riders with most teams bringing 7 riders except for; Trek–Segafredo, Team Novo Nordisk, Astana Qazaqstan Development Team and the National team of Cyprus who started with 6 while MG.K Vis Colors for Peace VPM only started with 5.

UCI WorldTeams

- Trek–Segafredo

UCI ProTeams

- Bingoal Pauwels Sauces WB
- Caja Rural–Seguros RGA
- Drone Hopper–Androni Giocattoli
- Human Powered Health
- Team Novo Nordisk

UCI Continental Teams

- Cross Team Legendre
- Allinq Continental Cycling Team
- Astana Qazaqstan Development Team
- BHS–PL Beton Bornholm
- Dukla Banská Bystrica
- Bolton Equities Black Spoke Pro Cycling
- Giotti Victoria–Savini Due
- MG.K Vis Colors for Peace VPM
- Tarteletto–Isorex
- Team Coop
- Terengganu Polygon Cycling Team
- XSpeed United Continental

National teams

- Cyprus
- Greece

== Route ==
The 2022 edition included five stages covering 858.6 kilometres (533.5 mi) over five days.

Stage characteristics and winners
| Stage | Date | Course | Distance | Type | Stage winner |
|---|---|---|---|---|---|
| 1 | 27 April | Heraklion to Chania | 190.1 km (118.1 mi) | Hilly stage | Aaron Gate (NZL) |
| 2 | 28 April | Marousi to Itea, Phocis | 165 km (103 mi) | Hilly stage | Matteo Moschetti (ITA) |
| 3 | 29 April | Delphi to Karditsa | 172.5 km (107.2 mi) | Hilly stage | Lennert Teugels (BEL) |
| 4 | 30 April | Karditsa to Larisa | 176.5 km (109.7 mi) | Hilly stage | Nils Broge (DEN) |
| 5 | 1 May | Kalabaka to Ioannina | 154.5 km (96.0 mi) | Hilly stage | Emil Toudal (DEN) |
| Total | | | 858.6 km (533.5 mi) | | |

== Stages ==
=== Stage 1 ===
27 April 2022 — Heraklion to Chania, 190.1 km (118.1 mi)

Stage 1 Result
| Rank | Rider | Team | Time |
|---|---|---|---|
| 1 | Aaron Gate (NZL) | Bolton Equities Black Spoke Pro Cycling | 4h 24' 10" |
| 2 | Eduard Prades (ESP) | Caja Rural–Seguros RGA | + 1' 46" |
| 3 | Filippo Baroncini (ITA) | Trek–Segafredo | + 1' 46" |
| 4 | Luc Wirtgen (LUX) | Bingoal Pauwels Sauces WB | + 1' 46" |
| 5 | Markus Hoelgaard (NOR) | Trek–Segafredo | + 1' 46" |
| 6 | Nils Broge (DEN) | BHS–PL Beton Bornholm | + 1' 46" |
| 7 | Mark Stewart (GBR) | Bolton Equities Black Spoke Pro Cycling | + 1' 46" |
| 8 | Gianni Marchand (BEL) | Tarteletto–Isorex | + 1' 46" |
| 9 | Lennert Teugels (BEL) | Tarteletto–Isorex | + 1' 46" |
| 10 | Paul Double (GBR) | MG.K Vis Colors for Peace VPM | + 1' 51" |

General classification after Stage 1
| Rank | Rider | Team | Time |
|---|---|---|---|
| 1 | Aaron Gate (NZL) | Bolton Equities Black Spoke Pro Cycling | 4h 23' 58" |
| 2 | Eduard Prades (ESP) | Caja Rural–Seguros RGA | + 1' 52" |
| 3 | Filippo Baroncini (ITA) | Trek–Segafredo | + 1' 54" |
| 4 | Nils Broge (DEN) | BHS–PL Beton Bornholm | + 1' 54" |
| 5 | Luc Wirtgen (LUX) | Bingoal Pauwels Sauces WB | + 1' 58" |
| 6 | Markus Hoelgaard (NOR) | Trek–Segafredo | + 1' 58" |
| 7 | Mark Stewart (GBR) | Bolton Equities Black Spoke Pro Cycling | + 1' 58" |
| 8 | Gianni Marchand (BEL) | Tarteletto–Isorex | + 1' 58" |
| 9 | Lennert Teugels (BEL) | Tarteletto–Isorex | + 1' 58" |
| 10 | Paul Double (GBR) | MG.K Vis Colors for Peace VPM | + 2' 03" |

=== Stage 2 ===
28 April 2022 — Marousi to Itea, Phocis, 165 km (103 mi)

Stage 2 Result
| Rank | Rider | Team | Time |
|---|---|---|---|
| 1 | Matteo Moschetti (ITA) | Trek–Segafredo | 3h 49' 59" |
| 2 | Andrea Peron (ITA) | Team Novo Nordisk | + 0" |
| 3 | Filippo Tagliani (ITA) | Drone Hopper–Androni Giocattoli | + 0" |
| 4 | August Jensen (NOR) | Human Powered Health | + 0" |
| 5 | Nils Broge (DEN) | BHS–PL Beton Bornholm | + 0" |
| 6 | Nicolas Dalla Valle (ITA) | Giotti Victoria–Savini Due | + 0" |
| 7 | Milan Menten (BEL) | Bingoal Pauwels Sauces WB | + 0" |
| 8 | Simone Piccolo (ITA) | MG.K Vis Colors for Peace VPM | + 0" |
| 9 | Rémi Lelandais (FRA) | Cross Team Legendre | + 0" |
| 10 | Attilio Viviani (ITA) | Bingoal Pauwels Sauces WB | + 0" |

General classification after Stage 2
| Rank | Rider | Team | Time |
|---|---|---|---|
| 1 | Aaron Gate (NZL) | Bolton Equities Black Spoke Pro Cycling | 8h 13' 55" |
| 2 | Nils Broge (DEN) | BHS–PL Beton Bornholm | + 1' 52" |
| 3 | Eduard Prades (ESP) | Caja Rural–Seguros RGA | + 1' 54" |
| 4 | Mark Stewart (GBR) | Bolton Equities Black Spoke Pro Cycling | + 1' 57" |
| 5 | Andrea Peron (ITA) | Team Novo Nordisk | + 1' 59" |
| 6 | Lennert Teugels (BEL) | Tarteletto–Isorex | + 2' 00" |
| 7 | Luc Wirtgen (LUX) | Bingoal Pauwels Sauces WB | + 2' 00" |
| 8 | Markus Hoelgaard (NOR) | Trek–Segafredo | + 2' 00" |
| 9 | Gianni Marchand (BEL) | Tarteletto–Isorex | + 2' 00" |
| 10 | Andreas Stokbro (DEN) | Team Coop | + 2' 05" |

=== Stage 3 ===
29 April 2022 — Delphi to Karditsa, 172.5 km (107.2 mi)

Stage 3 Result
| Rank | Rider | Team | Time |
|---|---|---|---|
| 1 | Lennert Teugels (BEL) | Tarteletto–Isorex | 4h 11' 57" |
| 2 | Edoardo Zardini (ITA) | Drone Hopper–Androni Giocattoli | + 0" |
| 3 | Periklis Ilias (GRE) | Greece | + 0" |
| 4 | Gianni Marchand (BEL) | Tarteletto–Isorex | + 0" |
| 5 | Paul Double (GBR) | MG.K Vis Colors for Peace VPM | + 0" |
| 6 | Anatoliy Budyak (UKR) | Terengganu Polygon Cycling Team | + 0" |
| 7 | Daniil Pronskiy (KAZ) | Astana Qazaqstan Development Team | + 0" |
| 8 | Luc Wirtgen (LUX) | Bingoal Pauwels Sauces WB | + 0" |
| 9 | Andreas Miltiadis (CYP) | Cyprus | + 0" |
| 10 | Embret Svestad-Bårdseng (NOR) | Team Coop | + 0" |

General classification after Stage 3
| Rank | Rider | Team | Time |
|---|---|---|---|
| 1 | Aaron Gate (NZL) | Bolton Equities Black Spoke Pro Cycling | 12h 25' 50" |
| 2 | Lennert Teugels (BEL) | Tarteletto–Isorex | + 1' 52" |
| 3 | Mark Stewart (GBR) | Bolton Equities Black Spoke Pro Cycling | + 1' 56" |
| 4 | Luc Wirtgen (LUX) | Bingoal Pauwels Sauces WB | + 2' 02" |
| 5 | Gianni Marchand (BEL) | Tarteletto–Isorex | + 2' 02" |
| 6 | Paul Double (GBR) | MG.K Vis Colors for Peace VPM | + 2' 06" |
| 7 | Edoardo Zardini (ITA) | Drone Hopper–Androni Giocattoli | + 2' 07" |
| 8 | Kenny Molly (BEL) | Bingoal Pauwels Sauces WB | + 2' 07" |
| 9 | Andreas Miltiadis (CYP) | Cyprus | + 2' 11" |
| 10 | Anatoliy Budyak (UKR) | Terengganu Polygon Cycling Team | + 2' 13" |

=== Stage 4 ===
30 April 2022 — Karditsa to Larisa, 176.5 km (109.7 mi)

Stage 4 Result
| Rank | Rider | Team | Time |
|---|---|---|---|
| 1 | Nils Broge (DEN) | BHS–PL Beton Bornholm | 4h 12' 19" |
| 2 | Attilio Viviani (ITA) | Bingoal Pauwels Sauces WB | + 0" |
| 3 | David González (ESP) | Caja Rural–Seguros RGA | + 0" |
| 4 | Andrea Peron (ITA) | Team Novo Nordisk | + 0" |
| 5 | Milan Menten (BEL) | Bingoal Pauwels Sauces WB | + 0" |
| 6 | Nicolas Dalla Valle (ITA) | Giotti Victoria–Savini Due | + 0" |
| 7 | Simone Piccolo (ITA) | MG.K Vis Colors for Peace VPM | + 0" |
| 8 | Filippo Baroncini (ITA) | Trek–Segafredo | + 0" |
| 9 | Sam Gademan (NED) | Allinq Continental Cycling Team | + 0" |
| 10 | Orken Slamzhanov (KAZ) | Astana Qazaqstan Development Team | + 0" |

General classification after Stage 4
| Rank | Rider | Team | Time |
|---|---|---|---|
| 1 | Aaron Gate (NZL) | Bolton Equities Black Spoke Pro Cycling | 16h 38' 09" |
| 2 | Lennert Teugels (BEL) | Tarteletto–Isorex | + 1' 52" |
| 3 | Mark Stewart (GBR) | Bolton Equities Black Spoke Pro Cycling | + 1' 56" |
| 4 | Luc Wirtgen (LUX) | Bingoal Pauwels Sauces WB | + 2' 02" |
| 5 | Gianni Marchand (BEL) | Tarteletto–Isorex | + 2' 02" |
| 6 | Paul Double (GBR) | MG.K Vis Colors for Peace VPM | + 2' 06" |
| 7 | Edoardo Zardini (ITA) | Drone Hopper–Androni Giocattoli | + 2' 07" |
| 8 | Kenny Molly (BEL) | Bingoal Pauwels Sauces WB | + 2' 07" |
| 9 | Andreas Miltiadis (CYP) | Cyprus | + 2' 11" |
| 10 | Anatoliy Budyak (UKR) | Terengganu Polygon Cycling Team | + 2' 13" |

=== Stage 5 ===
1 May 2022 — Kalabaka to Ioannina, 154.5 km (96.0 mi)

Stage 5 Result
| Rank | Rider | Team | Time |
|---|---|---|---|
| 1 | Emil Toudal (DEN) | BHS–PL Beton Bornholm | 4h 35' 24" |
| 2 | Joey Rosskopf (USA) | Human Powered Health | + 0" |
| 3 | Håkon Aalrust (NOR) | Team Coop | + 0" |
| 4 | Filippo Tagliani (ITA) | Drone Hopper–Androni Giocattoli | + 0" |
| 5 | Filippo Baroncini (ITA) | Trek–Segafredo | + 0" |
| 6 | David González (ESP) | Caja Rural–Seguros RGA | + 0" |
| 7 | Rémy Mertz (BEL) | Bingoal Pauwels Sauces WB | + 0" |
| 8 | Antoine Huby (FRA) | Cross Team Legendre | + 0" |
| 9 | Jon Barrenetxea (ESP) | Caja Rural–Seguros RGA | + 0" |
| 10 | Emil Schandorff Iwersen (DEN) | BHS–PL Beton Bornholm | + 0" |

General classification after Stage 5
| Rank | Rider | Team | Time |
|---|---|---|---|
| 1 | Aaron Gate (NZL) | Bolton Equities Black Spoke Pro Cycling | 21h 13' 33" |
| 2 | Lennert Teugels (BEL) | Tarteletto–Isorex | + 1' 52" |
| 3 | Mark Stewart (GBR) | Bolton Equities Black Spoke Pro Cycling | + 1' 56" |
| 4 | Luc Wirtgen (LUX) | Bingoal Pauwels Sauces WB | + 2' 00" |
| 5 | Gianni Marchand (BEL) | Tarteletto–Isorex | + 2' 02" |
| 6 | Paul Double (GBR) | MG.K Vis Colors for Peace VPM | + 2' 05" |
| 7 | Edoardo Zardini (ITA) | Drone Hopper–Androni Giocattoli | + 2' 07" |
| 8 | Kenny Molly (BEL) | Bingoal Pauwels Sauces WB | + 2' 07" |
| 9 | Andreas Miltiadis (CYP) | Cyprus | + 2' 11" |
| 10 | Anatoliy Budyak (UKR) | Terengganu Polygon Cycling Team | + 2' 13" |

== Classification leadership table ==
Classification leadership by stage
| Stage | Winner | General classification | Points classification | Mountains classification | Young rider classification | Team classification |
|---|---|---|---|---|---|---|
| 1 | Aaron Gate | Aaron Gate | Aaron Gate | James Fouché | Filippo Baroncini | Tarteletto–Isorex |
| 2 | Matteo Moschetti | Aaron Gate | Nils Broge | James Fouché | Emil Schandorff Iwersen | Tarteletto–Isorex |
| 3 | Lennert Teugels | Aaron Gate | Aaron Gate | James Fouché | Emil Schandorff Iwersen | Tarteletto–Isorex |
| 4 | Nils Broge | Aaron Gate | Nils Broge | James Fouché | Jon Barrenetxea | Tarteletto–Isorex |
| 5 | Emil Toudal | Aaron Gate | Nils Broge | Embret Svestad-Bårdseng | Jon Barrenetxea | Bingoal Pauwels Sauces WB |
| Final | | Aaron Gate | Nils Broge | Embret Svestad-Bårdseng | Jon Barrenetxea | Bingoal Pauwels Sauces WB |

== Final standings ==
Legend
| General classification | Denotes the winner of the general classification | Mountain classification | Denotes the winner of the mountains classification |
| Points classification | Denotes the winner of the points classification | Young rider classification | Denotes the winner of the Young rider classification |

=== General classification ===
Final General classification
| Rank | Rider | Team | Time |
|---|---|---|---|
| 1 | Aaron Gate (NZL) | Bolton Equities Black Spoke Pro Cycling | 21h 13' 33" |
| 2 | Lennert Teugels (BEL) | Tarteletto–Isorex | + 1' 52" |
| 3 | Mark Stewart (GBR) | Bolton Equities Black Spoke Pro Cycling | + 1' 56" |
| 4 | Luc Wirtgen (LUX) | Bingoal Pauwels Sauces WB | + 2' 00" |
| 5 | Gianni Marchand (BEL) | Tarteletto–Isorex | + 2' 02" |
| 6 | Paul Double (GBR) | MG.K Vis Colors for Peace VPM | + 2' 05" |
| 7 | Edoardo Zardini (ITA) | Drone Hopper–Androni Giocattoli | + 2' 07" |
| 8 | Kenny Molly (BEL) | Bingoal Pauwels Sauces WB | + 2' 07" |
| 9 | Andreas Miltiadis (CYP) | Cyprus | + 2' 11" |
| 10 | Anatoliy Budyak (UKR) | Terengganu Polygon Cycling Team | + 2' 13" |

=== Points classification ===
Final Points classification (1–10)
| Rank | Rider | Team | Points |
|---|---|---|---|
| 1 | Nils Broge (DEN) | BHS–PL Beton Bornholm | 11 |
| 2 | Aaron Gate (NZL) | Bolton Equities Black Spoke Pro Cycling | 9 |
| 3 | Sander Lemmens (BEL) | Tarteletto–Isorex | 9 |
| 4 | Emil Toudal (DEN) | BHS–PL Beton Bornholm | 6 |
| 5 | Mark Stewart (GBR) | Bolton Equities Black Spoke Pro Cycling | 6 |
| 6 | Jon Barrenetxea (ESP) | Caja Rural–Seguros RGA | 6 |
| 7 | Embret Svestad-Bårdseng (NOR) | Team Coop | 4 |
| 8 | Lennert Teugels (BEL) | Tarteletto–Isorex | 3 |
| 9 | Matteo Moschetti (ITA) | Trek–Segafredo | 3 |
| 10 | Jeroen Meijers (NED) | Terengganu Polygon Cycling Team | 3 |

=== Mountains classification ===
Final Mountains classification (1–10)
| Rank | Rider | Team | Points |
|---|---|---|---|
| 1 | Embret Svestad-Bårdseng (NOR) | Team Coop | 28 |
| 2 | James Fouché (NZL) | Bolton Equities Black Spoke Pro Cycling | 26 |
| 3 | Alessandro Monaco (ITA) | Giotti Victoria–Savini Due | 17 |
| 4 | Gavin Mannion (USA) | Human Powered Health | 15 |
| 5 | Maximilian Stedman (GBR) | MG.K Vis Colors for Peace VPM | 12 |
| 6 | Andreas Miltiadis (CYP) | Cyprus | 7 |
| 7 | Jon Barrenetxea (ESP) | Caja Rural–Seguros RGA | 7 |
| 8 | Aaron Gate (NZL) | Bolton Equities Black Spoke Pro Cycling | 6 |
| 9 | Emil Toudal (DEN) | BHS–PL Beton Bornholm | 6 |
| 10 | Mark Stewart (GBR) | Bolton Equities Black Spoke Pro Cycling | 4 |

=== Young rider classification ===
Final Young rider classification (1–10)
| Rank | Rider | Team | Time |
|---|---|---|---|
| 1 | Jon Barrenetxea (ESP) | Caja Rural–Seguros RGA | 21h 16' 33" |
| 2 | Emil Schandorff Iwersen (DEN) | BHS–PL Beton Bornholm | + 6" |
| 3 | Antoine Huby (FRA) | Cross Team Legendre | + 6" |
| 4 | Filippo Baroncini (ITA) | Trek–Segafredo | + 54" |
| 5 | Embret Svestad-Bårdseng (NOR) | Team Coop | + 4' 38" |
| 6 | Andrey Remkhe (KAZ) | Astana Qazaqstan Development Team | + 13' 58" |
| 7 | Daniil Pronskiy (KAZ) | Astana Qazaqstan Development Team | + 17' 49" |
| 8 | Josu Etxeberria (ESP) | Caja Rural–Seguros RGA | + 24' 38" |
| 9 | Gleb Brussenskiy (KAZ) | Astana Qazaqstan Development Team | + 25' 48" |
| 10 | Denis Sergiyenko (KAZ) | Astana Qazaqstan Development Team | + 26' 19" |

|}

=== Team classification ===
Final Team classification (1–10)
| Rank | Team | Time |
|---|---|---|
| 1 | Bingoal Pauwels Sauces WB | 63h 47' 54" |
| 2 | Caja Rural–Seguros RGA | + 2' 461" |
| 3 | Bolton Equities Black Spoke Pro Cycling | + 4' 29" |
| 4 | Trek–Segafredo | + 6' 22" |
| 5 | Tarteletto–Isorex | + 7' 12" |
| 6 | Drone Hopper–Androni Giocattoli | + 10' 16" |
| 7 | Team Coop | + 11' 18" |
| 8 | Human Powered Health | + 13' 54" |
| 9 | BHS–PL Beton Bornholm | + 14' 50" |
| 10 | Terengganu Polygon Cycling Team | + 23' 35" |
