= Daniel Pearson (cyclist) =

British cyclist

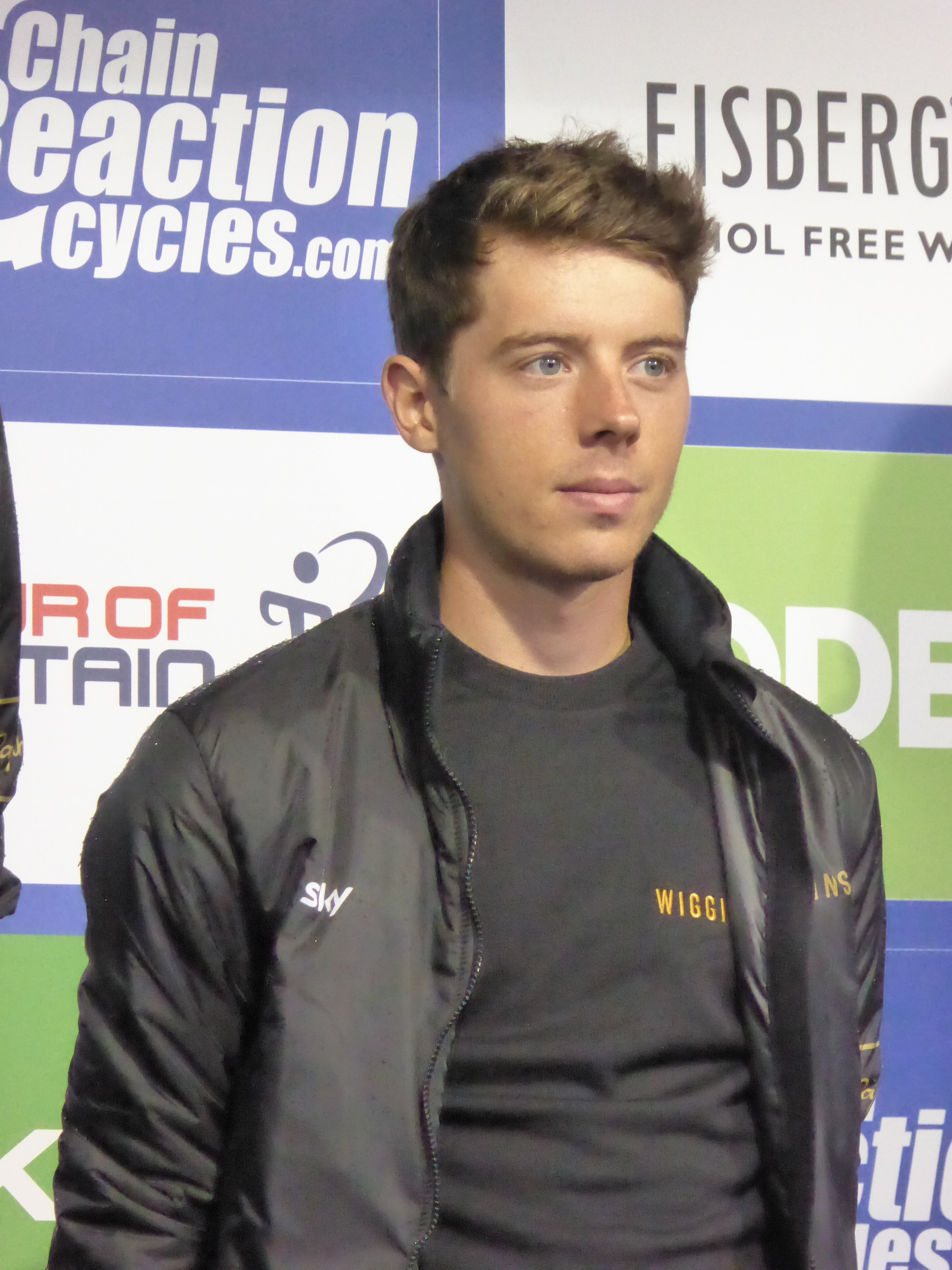
- Pearson at the 2016 Tour of Britain

Personal information
- Full name: Daniel George Pearson
- Nickname: Big Dan
- Born: 26 February 1994 (age 32) Cardiff, Wales
- Height: 1.65 m (5 ft 5 in)
- Weight: 53 kg (117 lb)

Cycling career
- Sport: Cycling
- Discipline: Road
- Role: Rider
- Rider type: Climber

Amateur teams
- 2012–2014: Zappi
- 2014: Zalf–Euromobil–Désirée–Fior

Professional teams
- 2015–2016: WIGGINS
- 2017–2018: Aqua Blue Sport
- 2019–2020: Canyon dhb p/b Bloor Homes
- 2021: Vini Zabù

Daniel George Pearson (born 26 February 1994) is a Welsh cyclist, who last rode for UCI ProTeam Vini Zabù.

== Major results ==
2011
1st Road race, National Junior Road Championships
2014
2nd Coppa della Pace
8th Overall Giro della Valle d'Aosta
2015
5th Overall Giro della Valle d'Aosta
7th Trofeo Alcide Degasperi
2016
10th Overall Ronde de l'Isard
2018
6th Overall Tour of Croatia
2019
4th Overall Tour de la Mirabelle

1st Mountains classification
1st Stage 2
