= Jens Keukeleire =

Belgian road racing cyclist (born 1988)

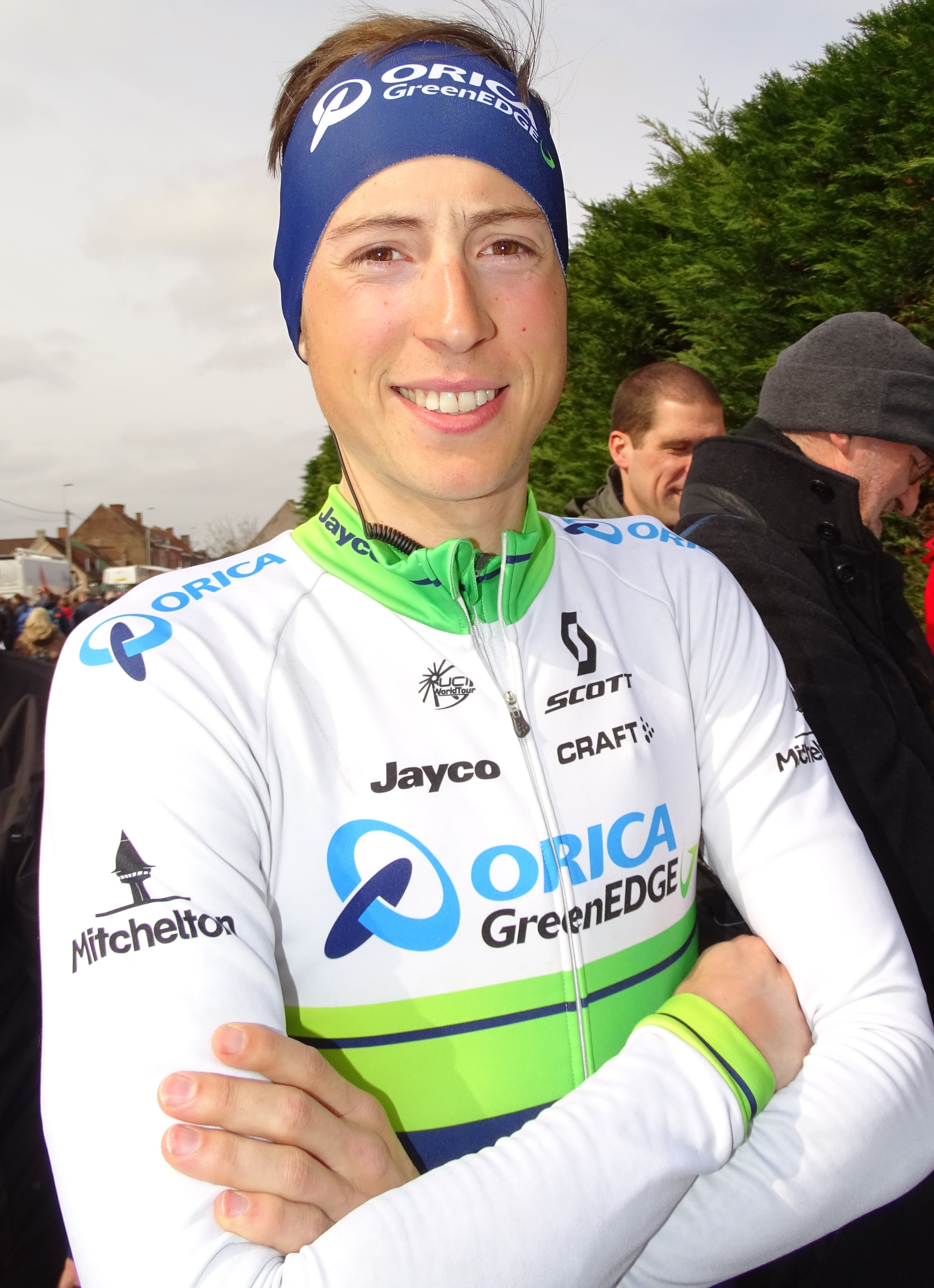
- Keukeleire at the 2015 E3 Harelbeke.

Personal information
- Full name: Jens Keukeleire
- Born: 23 November 1988 (age 37) Bruges, Flanders, Belgium
- Height: 185 cm (6 ft 1 in)
- Weight: 69 kg (152 lb)

Cycling career
- Sport: Cycling
- Current team: Retired
- Discipline: Road
- Role: Rider
- Rider type: Classics specialist

Amateur team
- 2007–2009: WC Soenens

Professional teams
- 2010–2011: Cofidis
- 2012–2017: GreenEDGE
- 2018–2019: Lotto–Soudal
- 2020–2023: EF Pro Cycling

Major wins
- Grand Tours Vuelta a España 1 individual stage (2016) Stage races Tour of Belgium (2017, 2018)

Jens Keukeleire (born 23 November 1988) is a Belgian former professional road racing cyclist, who competed as a professional from 2010 to 2023.

== Major results ==
2009
3rd Circuit de Wallonie
4th Road race, UEC European Road Championships
6th Kattekoers
7th Memorial Van Coningsloo
2010 (4 pro wins)
1st Overall Driedaagse van West-Vlaanderen

1st Points classification
1st Young rider classification
1st Stage 1

1st Le Samyn
1st Nokere Koerse
5th Trofeo Magalluf–Palmanova
5th Paris–Brussels
6th Trofeo Cala Millor
2011 (1)
1st Stage 3 Tour of Austria
4th Nokere Koerse
9th Overall Tour of Belgium
2012
1st Stage 2 (TTT) Eneco Tour
9th Paris–Tours
10th Dwars door Vlaanderen
10th Binche–Tournai–Binche
2013 (2)
Vuelta a Burgos

1st Stages 2 & 3

7th Dwars door Vlaanderen
2014
6th Overall Tour de l'Eurométropole
7th Gran Premio Città di Camaiore
8th Overall Eneco Tour
9th Dwars door Vlaanderen
2015
6th Paris–Roubaix
9th E3 Harelbeke
2016 (2)
1st Stage 12 Vuelta a España
1st Stage 1 Tour of Slovenia
2nd Halle–Ingooigem
3rd Gran Premio Bruno Beghelli
5th Dwars door Vlaanderen
7th Tre Valli Varesine
2017 (1)
1st Overall Tour of Belgium
2nd Gent–Wevelgem
4th Road race, National Road Championships
5th Bruges Cycling Classic
Combativity award Stage 19 Tour de France
2018 (1)
1st Overall Tour of Belgium
4th Omloop van het Houtland
10th Famenne Ardenne Classic
2019
3rd Overall Four Days of Dunkirk
5th Binche–Chimay–Binche
5th Omloop van het Houtland
7th Overall Deutschland Tour
7th Kuurne–Brussels–Kuurne
2020
4th Cadel Evans Great Ocean Road Race

=== Grand Tour results timeline ===
Grand Tour general classification results timeline
Grand Tour	2012	2013	2014	2015	2016	2017	2018	2019	2020	2021
Giro d'Italia	127	73	—	—	—	—	—	—	—	78
Tour de France	—	—	67	—	—	59	DNF	98	89	—
Vuelta a España	—	—	—	93	64	—	—	—	—	50
