= Lennert Teugels =

Belgian cyclist (born 1993)

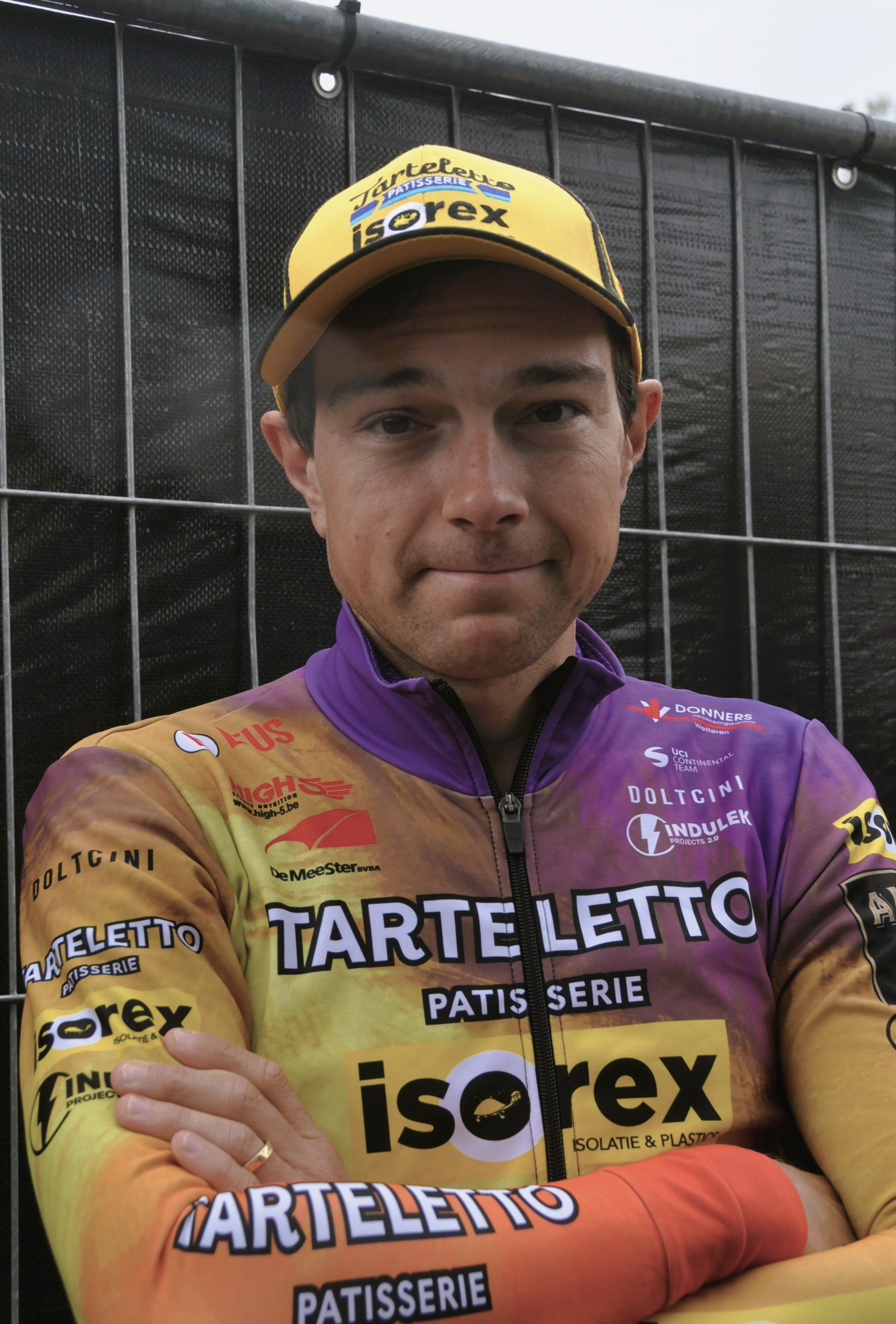
- Teugels in 2026.

Personal information
- Born: 9 April 1993 (age 33) Opwijk, Belgium
- Height: 1.75 m (5 ft 9 in)
- Weight: 64 kg (141 lb)

Cycling career
- Sport: Cycling
- Current team: Tarteletto–Isorex
- Discipline: Road
- Role: Rider
- Rider type: Puncheur

Amateur teams
- 2013–2017: United CT
- 2017: Vérandas Willems–Crelan (stagiaire)

Professional teams
- 2018–2019: Cibel–Cebon
- 2020–2022: Tarteletto–Isorex
- 2023–2024: Bingoal WB
- 2025–: Tarteletto–Isorex

Lennert Teugels (born 9 April 1993) is a Belgian cyclist, who currently rides for UCI Continental team Tarteletto–Isorex.

== Major results ==
2011
10th Remouchamps-Ferrières-Remouchamps
2017
3rd Overall Tour de Namur

1st Stage 3

3rd Flèche Ardennaise
6th Omloop Het Nieuwsblad U23
2018
2nd Tour de Vendée
3rd Overall Kreiz Breizh Elites
2019
2nd Overall Tour de Liège
7th Volta Limburg Classic
7th Overall Flèche du Sud
2021
Tour du Rwanda

1st Mountains classification
1st Sprints classification

8th Gylne Gutuer
2022
2nd Overall International Tour of Hellas

1st Stage 3

3rd Overall Belgrade Banjaluka
4th SD WORX Criterium du Brabant Wallon
4th Dwars door Wingene
9th Circuit de Wallonie
9th Polynormande
2023
1st Mountains classification, La Tropicale Amissa Bongo
6th Volta Limburg Classic
9th Muscat Classic
10th Per sempre Alfredo
2024
9th Gran Premio Castellón
2026
9th Overall Tour de Wallonie
