= Gianni Marchand =

Belgian cyclist

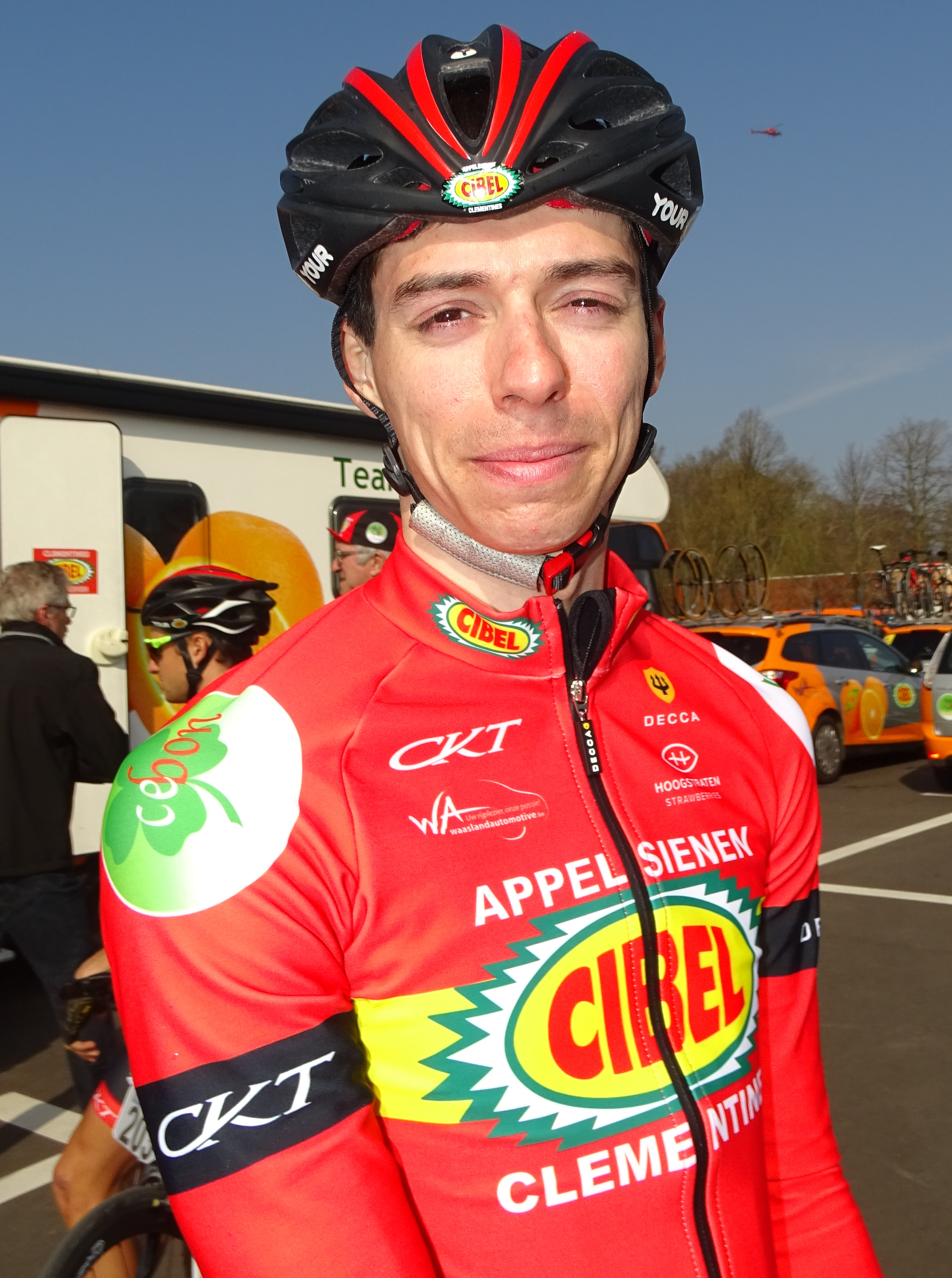
- Marchand in 2017

Personal information
- Full name: Gianni Marchand
- Born: 1 June 1990 (age 36) Aartrijke, Belgium
- Height: 1.81 m (5 ft 11 in)
- Weight: 61 kg (134 lb)

Cycling career
- Sport: Cycling
- Current team: Tarteletto–Isorex
- Discipline: Road
- Role: Rider

Amateur team
- 2010–2015: KSV Deerlijk–Gaverzicht

Professional teams
- 2016–2019: Cibel–Cebon
- 2020–: Tarteletto–Isorex

Gianni Marchand (born 1 June 1990) is a Belgian cyclist, who currently rides for UCI Continental team Tarteletto–Isorex.

== Major results ==
2016
2nd Circuit de Wallonie
2018
1st Overall Flèche du Sud
1st Paris–Mantes-en-Yvelines
5th Duo Normand
6th Overall Tour of Belgium
6th De Kustpijl
9th Tour de Vendée
10th Overall Tour de Taiwan
2019
3rd Arno Wallaard Memorial
7th Classic Loire Atlantique
8th Overall Flèche du Sud
2021
3rd Overall Tour of Belgium
2022
1st Stage 1 Tour of Azerbaijan (Iran)
2nd Overall Belgrade Banjaluka
5th Overall International Tour of Hellas
6th Overall Tour du Rwanda
8th Brussels Cycling Classic
