= Luc Wirtgen =

Luxembourgish cyclist

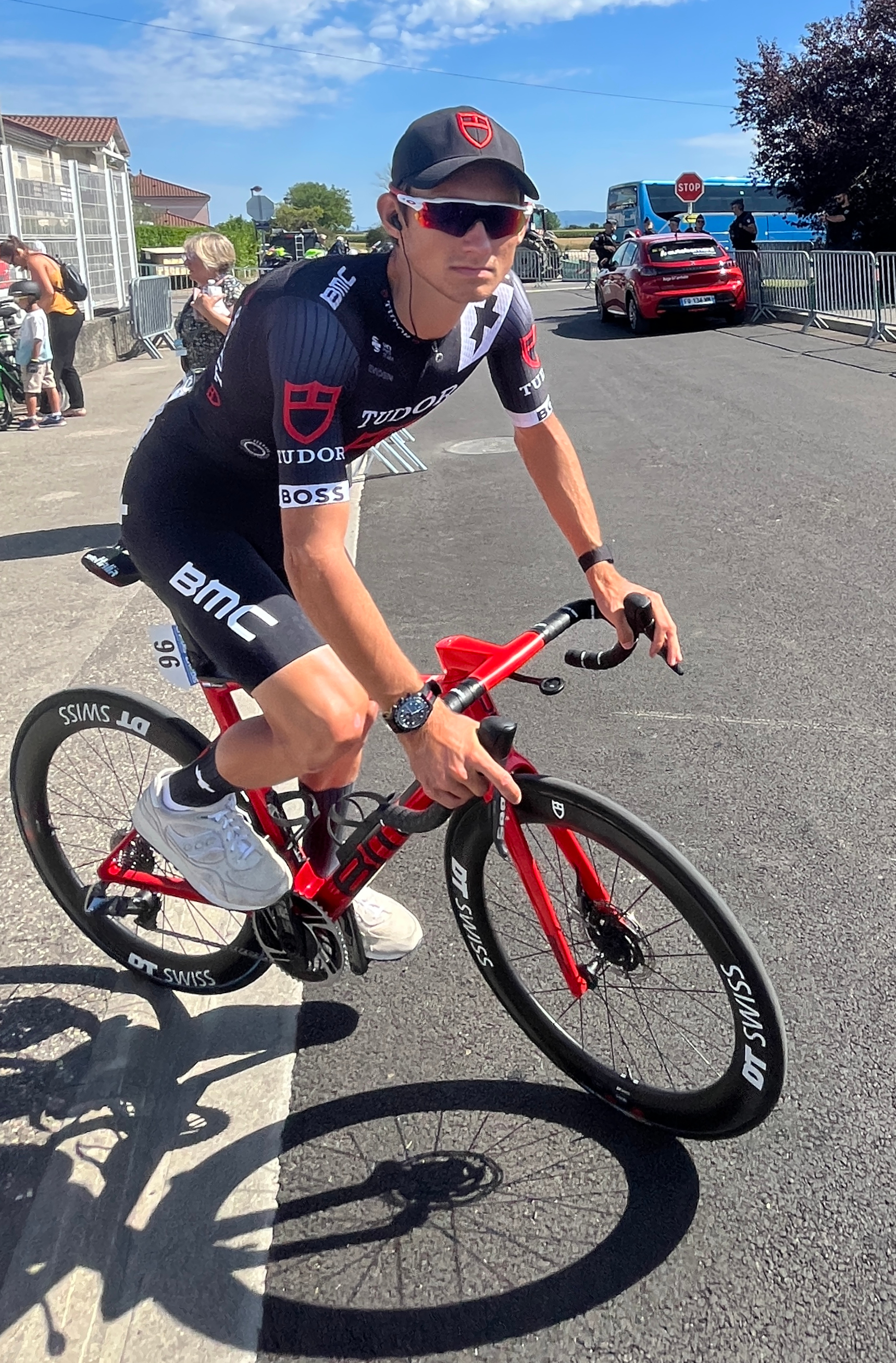
- Wirtgen in 2023

Personal information
- Born: 7 July 1998 (age 28)
- Height: 1.80 m (5 ft 11 in)
- Weight: 63 kg (139 lb)

Cycling career
- Sport: Cycling
- Current team: Tudor Pro Cycling Team
- Discipline: Road
- Role: Rider

Amateur teams
- 2016: UC Dippach
- 2019: Wallonie Bruxelles (stagiaire)

Professional teams
- 2017–2018: Leopard Pro Cycling
- 2019: Wallonie–Bruxelles Development Team
- 2020–2022: Bingoal–Wallonie Bruxelles
- 2023–: Tudor Pro Cycling Team

Luc Wirtgen (born 7 July 1998) is a Luxembourgish cyclist, who currently rides for UCI ProTeam Tudor Pro Cycling Team. His brother Tom is also a professional cyclist.

== Major results ==
2018
2nd Road race, National Under-23 Road Championships
2021
5th Road race, National Road Championships
9th Tour du Jura
2022
3rd Overall Tour of Antalya
4th Overall International Tour of Hellas
5th Time trial, National Road Championships
6th Per sempre Alfredo
