= Conor Dunne =

Irish bicycle racer

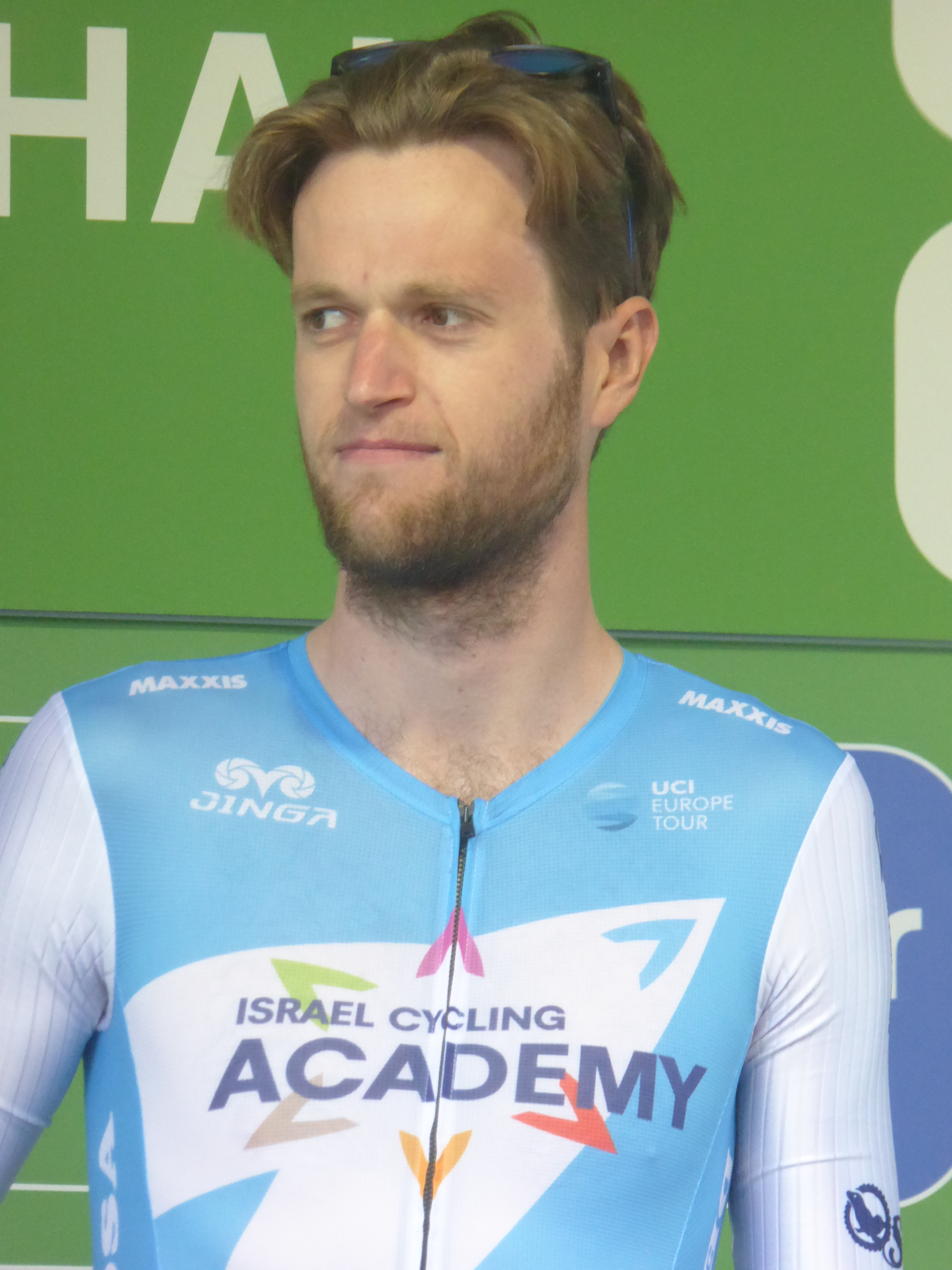
- Dunne at the 2019 Tour of Britain

Personal information
- Full name: Conor Dunne
- Nickname: The Langer
- Born: 22 January 1992 (age 34) St Albans, Hertfordshire, England
- Height: 2.04 m (6 ft 8 in)
- Weight: 88 kg (194 lb)

Cycling career
- Sport: Cycling
- Current team: Retired
- Discipline: Road
- Role: Rider
- Rider type: Rouleur

Amateur teams
- 2009: Hemel Hempstead CC
- 2009–2010: Glendene CC
- 2011–2012: VL Technics–Abutriek
- 2013: Iverk Carrick Wheelers

Professional teams
- 2014–2015: An Post–Chain Reaction
- 2016: JLT–Condor
- 2017–2018: Aqua Blue Sport
- 2019: Israel Cycling Academy

Major wins
- One-day races and Classics Irish National Road Race Championships (2018)

Conor Dunne (born 22 January 1992) is a retired road racing cyclist who rode professionally between 2014 and 2019 for the An Post–Chain Reaction, JLT–Condor, Aqua Blue Sport and Israel Cycling Academy teams. He competed as British in his early career before switching to Ireland, and was the Irish National Road Race Championships winner in 2018. Dunne contested the road race at the UCI Road World Championships four times for Ireland, failing to finish the race on every occasion.

== Career ==
=== Junior and amateur career ===
Born in St Albans, Dunne initially represented Great Britain and competed for amateur teams in the UK, Belgium and Ireland. He won the junior British National Time Trial Championships title in 2010, after finishing second in the 2009 race. Dunne was also eligible to represent Ireland and switched his sporting allegiance prior to the 2011 season.

While still an amateur, in 2011 he participated in his first professional stage race at the Rás Tailteann. In 2012 he won the Irish National Men's Under-23 Time Trial Championships, his first national victory as an Irish rider and one of seven career podium finishes at elite and under-23 Irish championship races. Dunne's first victory in a professional race came on stage one of the 2013 Rás Tailteann while riding for Irish amateur team Iverk Carrick Wheelers. He won the 135-kilometre (84-mile) stage from Dunboyne to Longford after outsprinting three-time New Zealand National Criterium champion Michael Northey to the line. After bonus seconds were applied, Dunne held the overall lead by four seconds and also led the points and youth classifications going into stage two.

=== Professional career ===
==== An Post–Chain Reaction, JLT–Condor (2014–2016) ====
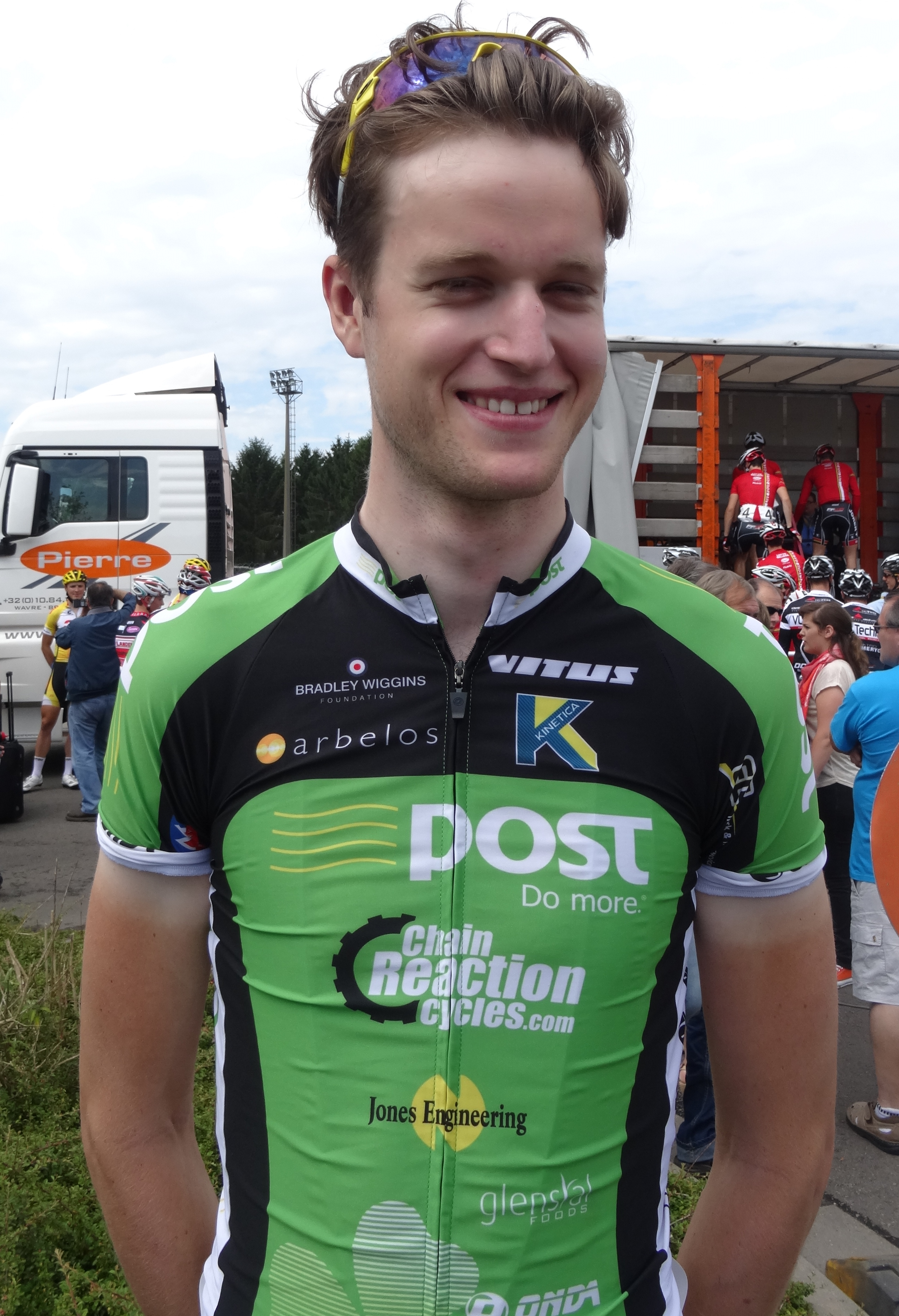
Dunne at the 2014 Memorial Van Coningsloo

He signed with An Post–Chain Reaction for the 2014 season. He stayed with the team for 2015, recording a ninth-place finish at Dwars door de Vlaamse Ardennen before moving to fellow UCI Continental team JLT–Condor for 2016. His first win as a full professional came at the Rutland–Melton CiCLE Classic in April 2016. In a race that was neutralised for twenty minutes while two riders were airlifted to hospital, Dunne overcame the cold and windy conditions to break clear from a ten-rider group in the closing stages and took victory by fourteen seconds.

==== Aqua Blue Sport (2017–2018) ====
After moving to Aqua Blue Sport he was named in the startlist for the 2017 Vuelta a España. Dunne finished the race in 158th place, the last classified rider in the final standings.

In 2018, Dunne won the Irish National Road Race Championships; racing over 180 kilometres (110 miles) on a circuit around Collooney, he finished one minute and one second ahead of Darnell Moore in second and over three minutes clear of Mark Downey in third. Reflecting on the race, Dunne said "It was massive for me. It’s a race I had been trying to win for a long time. It meant a lot to me and to my partner Stacey and her family too." Stacey's father is Dunne's former team manager and Irish cycling legend Sean Kelly. Kelly won the Irish junior road race title twice but never triumphed in the elite race.

==== Israel Cycling Academy (2019) ====
Following the collapse of Aqua Blue Sport, in November 2018 it emerged that Dunne would join the Israel Cycling Academy team for the 2019 season. His salary for the year was paid by former Aqua Blue owner Rick Delaney due to Dunne signing a contract with the team for 2019 before it folded. He recorded a fifth-place overall finish at the Tour of Antalya that February.

In May 2019, he was named in the startlist for the 2019 Giro d'Italia. Wearing the Irish national champion's jersey, he completed the race in 135th place and finished 20th on stage twelve from Cuneo to Pinerolo, his highest placing in an individual Grand Tour stage. Following the Giro d'Italia, Dunne finished ninth at the Fyen Rundt in August.

On 30 December 2019, at the age of 27, he announced on social media that he was retiring from professional cycling.

=== Global Cycling Network (GCN) ===
On 7 January 2020, Global Cycling Network (GCN) announced him as a new presenter.

On 2 May 2020 GCN's YouTube channel released a video where Dunne turned his garden into a Velodrome to create a Garden Hour Cycling Distance record with help from his brother-in-law Nigel. The distance covered was 16.3 kilometres (10.1 miles), which was listed as a new record (as there was no existing record in place). His maximum speed was 24.3 kilometres per hour (15.1 miles per hour).

=== Atlas Mountain Race 2026 ===
In February 2026, Dunne entered the Atlas Mountain Race in Morocco, a gruelling 1400 km self supported race from Beni-Mellal to Essaouira on the west coast. Dunne failed to complete the challenge only managing 710 km of the distance.

== Personal life ==
His sister is tennis player Katy Dunne.

== Major results ==
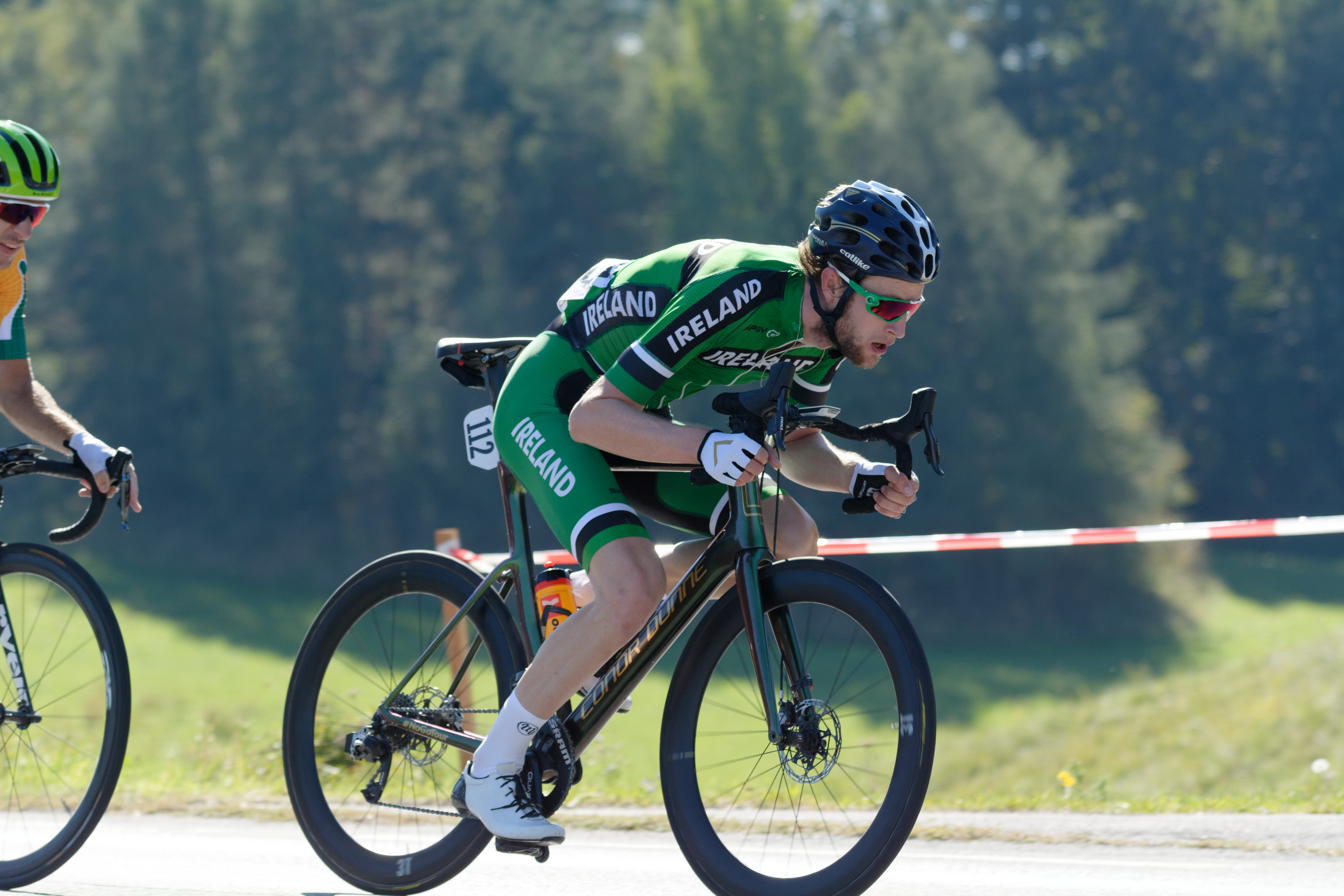
Dunne at the 2018 UCI Road World Championships

2009
2nd Time trial, British National Junior Road Championships
2010
1st Time trial, British National Junior Road Championships
2012
1st Time trial, Irish National Under-23 Road Championships
2013
1st Stage 1 An Post Rás
Irish National Under-23 Road Championships

2nd Time trial
3rd Road race

2014
3rd Road race, Irish National Under-23 Road Championships
2015
3rd Road race, Irish National Road Championships
9th Dwars door de Vlaamse Ardennen
2016
1st Rutland–Melton CiCLE Classic
2017
3rd Road race, Irish National Road Championships
2018
1st Road race, Irish National Road Championships
2019
5th Overall Tour of Antalya
9th Fyen Rundt

=== Grand Tour general classification results timeline ===
Grand Tour	2017	2018	2019
Giro d'Italia	—	—	135
Tour de France	—	—	—
Vuelta a España	158	—	—

Legend
—	Did not compete
DNF	Did not finish
