= Mark Christian =

Manx professional cyclist

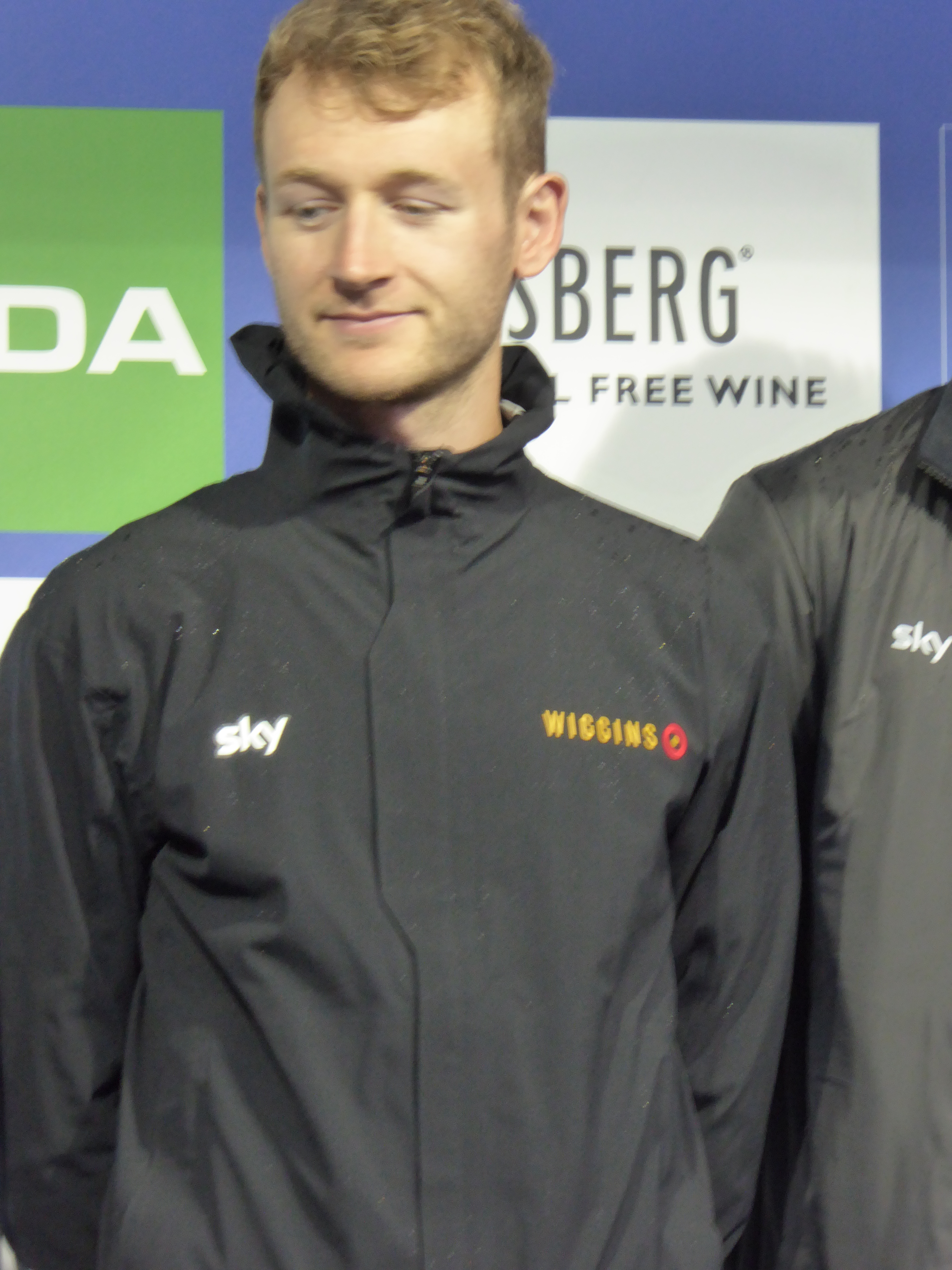
- Christian at the 2016 Tour of Britain.

Personal information
- Full name: Mark Peter Christian
- Born: 20 November 1990 (age 35) Douglas, Isle of Man

Cycling career
- Sport: Cycling
- Disciplines: Track; Road
- Role: Rider

Professional teams
- 2012: An Post–Sean Kelly
- 2013–2014: Team Raleigh
- 2015–2016: WIGGINS
- 2017–2018: Aqua Blue Sport
- 2019: Team Wiggins Le Col
- 2020: Canyon dhb p/b Soreen
- 2021–2022: Eolo–Kometa
Medal record
Representing Great Britain
Men's track cycling
World Cup
Gold medal – first place	2014 London	Madison
Representing Isle of Man
Men's track cycling
Commonwealth Games
Bronze medal – third place	2010 Delhi	Points Race

Mark Peter Christian (born 20 November 1990) is a Manx former racing cyclist, who last rode for UCI ProTeam Eolo–Kometa.

A former member of the Great Britain Olympic Development Program, Christian won a bronze medal for the Isle of Man at the 2010 Commonwealth Games in the 40-kilometre (25-mile) Scratch Race. He is the brother of fellow racing cyclist Anna Christian.

== Professional background ==
In 2007, Christian was signed to the British Olympic Development Program. In 2008, he won the Junioren Rundfahrt in Germany, and picked up a number of medals at the European Track Championships.

In February 2009, Christian was selected for Great Britain at the World Cup in Copenhagen. Later that month, he picked up the British Madison title in Manchester, alongside fellow Manxman Peter Kennaugh. In July, he won silver in the under-23 team pursuit and bronze in the under-23 points race at the European Track Championships in Belarus.

In 2010, Christian was confirmed as part of the Isle of Man squad for the 2010 Commonwealth Games. On 6 October, he finished third in the final of the 40 km Points race in Delhi to win the bronze medal. He also reached the final of the scratch race at the Commonwealth Games, finishing sixth.

Christian began 2011 at the UCI Track World Cup in Beijing. He picked up a bronze medal as part of the team pursuit.

In November 2011, Christian signed for professional UCI team An Post–Sean Kelly.

Christian won the British Madison title for the 3rd time in January 2012, alongside Simon Yates.

He joined Team Raleigh for the 2013 season. In 2015 Christian moved to the new WIGGINS team set up by Bradley Wiggins aiming to prepare British riders for the team pursuit at the 2016 Summer Olympics. Christian joined the Aqua Blue Sport squad for its inaugural season in 2017.

He was named in the startlist for the 2017 Vuelta a España.

== Major results ==
2008
National Junior Track Championships

1st Individual pursuit
1st Points race

Junior Tour of Wales

1st Points classification
1st Mountains classification

2009
National Track Championships

1st Madison (with Peter Kennaugh)
3rd Scratch

2010
National Track Championships

1st Madison (with Luke Rowe)
3rd Points race

7th ZLM Tour
8th Overall Tour de Berlin
2011
3rd Points race, National Track Championships
2012
1st Madison (with Simon Yates), National Track Championships
2014
1st Madison (with Owain Doull), UCI Track World Cup, London
2nd Points race, National Track Championships
2nd Beaumont Trophy
2016
5th Overall Tour Alsace
6th Overall Okolo Slovenska
2017
7th Overall Tour de Yorkshire
2018
1st Mountains classification, Tour de Suisse
2019
3rd Overall Tour of the Reservoir

=== Grand Tour general classification results timeline ===
Grand Tour	2017	2018	2019	2020	2021
Giro d'Italia	—	—	—	—	76
Tour de France	—	—	—	—	—
Vuelta a España	138	—	—	—	—

Legend
—	Did not compete
DNF	Did not finish
