= Tarteletto–Isorex =

Belgian cycling team

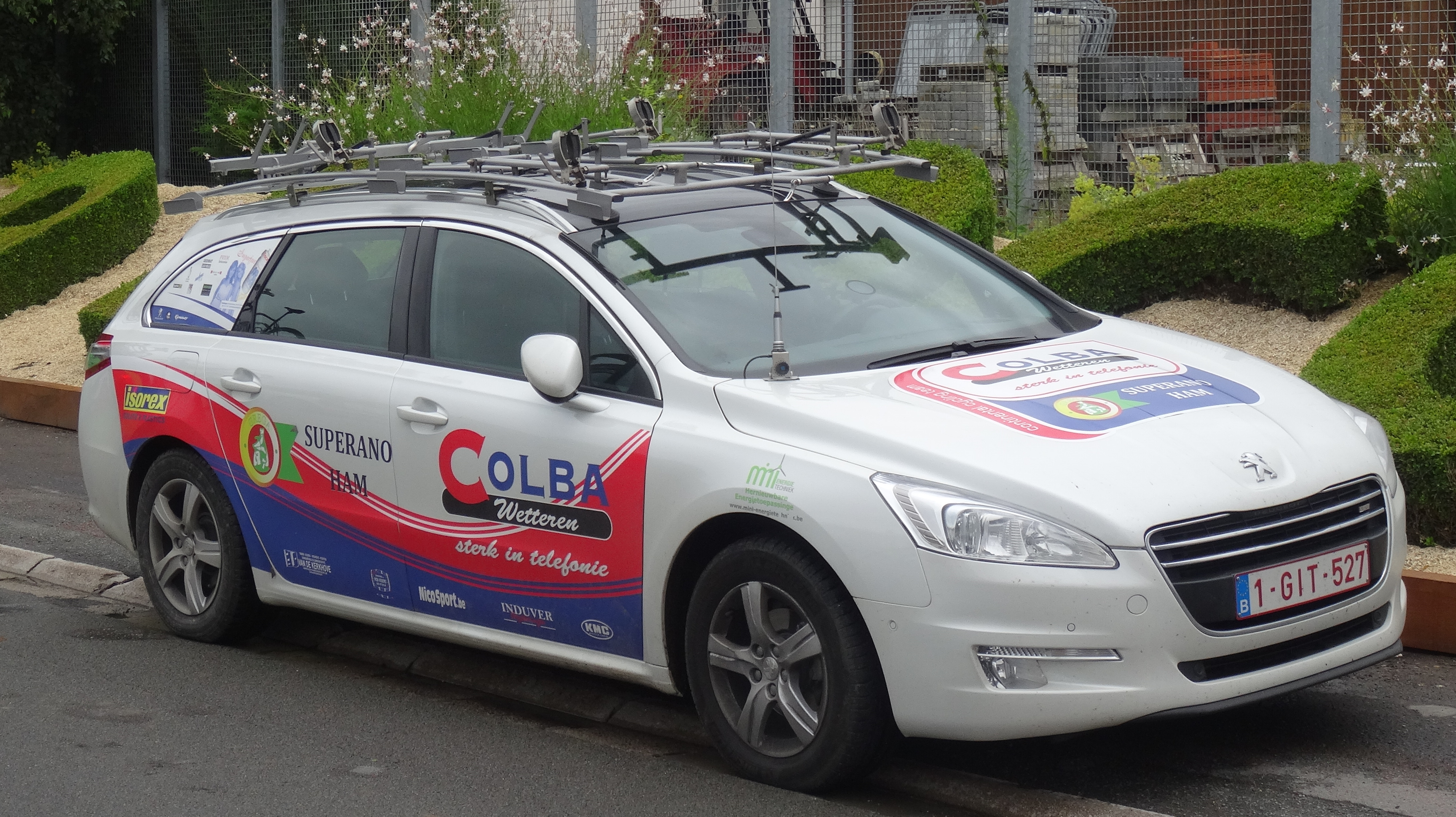
- A team car in 2014

Team information
- UCI code: TIS
- Registered: Belgium
- Founded: 2010
- Discipline: Road
- Status: UCI Continental

Key personnel
- General manager: Peter Bauwens
- Team managers: Daniël De Bie; Rony De Vos

Team name history
- 2010 2011 2012–2015 2015–2016 2017–: Colba–Mercury–Dourphonie; Colba–Mercury; Colba–Superano Ham; Superano Ham–Isorex; Tarteletto–Isorex
Tarteletto–Isorex jersey
Jersey

Tarteletto–Isorex is a Belgian UCI Continental team founded in 2010.

== Team roster ==
As of 7 February 2023.

Rider	Date of birth
Len De Pauw (BEL)	16 May 2000 (age 26)
Maxime De Poorter (BEL)	21 April 1996 (age 30)
Torsten Demeyere (BEL)	17 April 1998 (age 28)
Timothy Dupont (BEL)	1 November 1987 (age 38)
Jonas Geens (BEL)	4 January 1999 (age 27)
Bo Godart (BEL)	31 August 1998 (age 28)
Andreas Goeman (BEL)	7 August 1999 (age 27)
Thomas Joseph (BEL)	6 December 1996 (age 29)

Rider	Date of birth
Gianni Marchand (BEL)	1 June 1990 (age 36)
Jacob Relaes (BEL)	18 May 1996 (age 30)
Brent Van de Kerkhove (BEL)	12 October 1994 (age 31)
Alex Vandenbulcke (BEL)	25 November 2001 (age 24)
Kobe Vanoverschelde (BEL)	19 September 1987 (age 38)
Thibau Verhofstadt (BEL)	16 August 1998 (age 28)
Mauro Verwilt (BEL)	11 June 2000 (age 26)

== Major wins ==
2011
Ronde van Noord-Holland, Niels Wytinck
GP Impanis-Van Petegem, Sander Cordeel
2012
Flèche Ardennaise, Clement Lhotellerie
2017
Overall Tour of Iran (Azerbaijan), Rob Ruijgh
2019
Prologue Tour d'Egypte, Polychronis Tzortzakis
Stage 2 Tour du Maroc, Abram Stockman
Stages 7 & 8 Tour du Maroc, Polychronis Tzortzakis
Internationale Wielertrofee Jong Maar Moedig, Julien Van den Brande
Overall In the steps of Romans, Polychronis Tzortzakis

Stage 1, Polychronis Tzortzakis

Stage 5 Tour of Azerbaijan (Iran), Thomas Joseph
2021
Dorpenomloop Rucphen, Elias Van Breussegem
2022
Stage 5 Belgrade Banjaluka, Andreas Goeman
Stage 3 International Tour of Hellas, Lennert Teugels
2023
Stage 1 Tour of Qinghai Lake, Timothy Dupont
Overall Tour de la Mirabelle, Jonas Geens
2026
1st Dorpenomloop Rucphen, Timothy Dupont

== Major results ==
2019
Greece Time Trial, Polychronis Tzortzakis
Albania Time Trial, Ylber Sefa
Albania Road Race, Ylber Sefa
2020
Albania Time Trial, Ylber Sefa
Albania Road Race, Ylber Sefa
2021
Albania Time Trial, Ylber Sefa
Albania Road Race, Ylber Sefa
