= Peter Koning =

Dutch cyclist (born 1990)

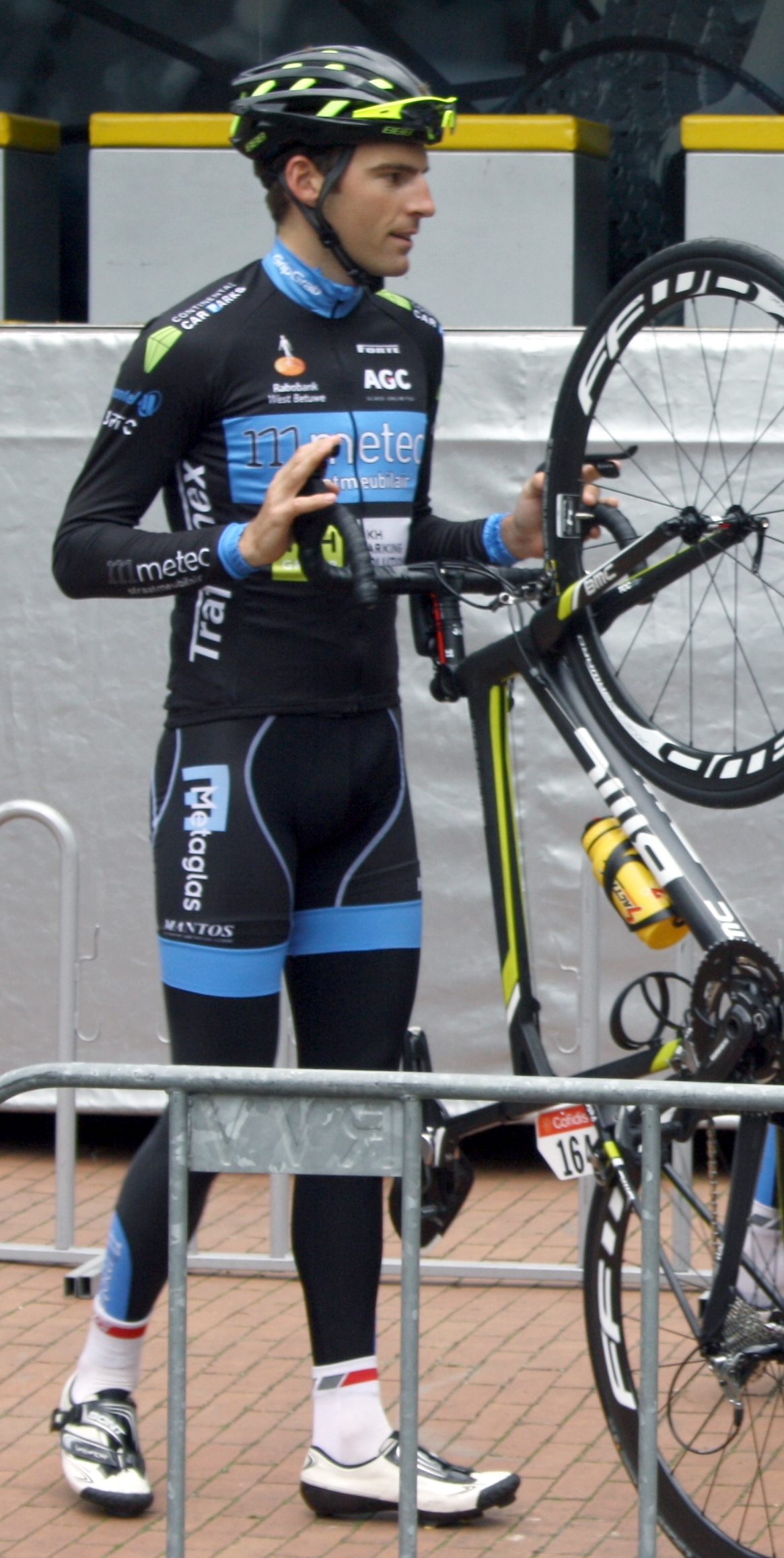
- Koning in 2014

Personal information
- Full name: Peter Koning
- Born: 3 December 1990 (age 35) Venhuizen, Netherlands

Cycling career
- Sport: Cycling
- Discipline: Road
- Role: Rider

Amateur team
- 2009–2011: Line Lloyd Footwear

Professional teams
- 2012–2014: Metec Continental Cyclingteam
- 2015–2016: Drapac Professional Cycling
- 2017–2018: Aqua Blue Sport
- 2019: Bike Aid
- 2019–2020: EvoPro Racing

Peter Koning (born 3 December 1990) is a Dutch professional racing cyclist, who most recently rode for UCI Continental team EvoPro Racing. He was named in the startlist for the 2017 Vuelta a España.

== Major results ==
2007
1st Time trial, National Junior Road Championships
2012
1st Time trial, National Under-23 Road Championships
5th Ronde van Midden-Nederland
7th Overall Olympia's Tour
2013
2nd Overall Olympia's Tour
5th Rabo Baronie Breda Classic
2014
1st Stage 1 (TTT) Czech Cycling Tour
4th Overall Okolo Slovenska

1st Stage 1 (TTT)

5th Duo Normand (with Brian van Goethem)
2016
1st Grote Prijs Beeckman-De Caluwé
1st Stage 3 Tour de San Luis
4th Overall Tour of Iran (Azerbaijan)

1st Stage 2

2018
1st Mountains classification Tour of Croatia
2019
1st Overall Tour of Mersin

1st Stage 3

7th Overall Tour of Mesopotamia
7th PWZ Zuidenveld Tour

=== Grand Tour general classification results timeline ===
Grand Tour	2017
Giro d'Italia	—
Tour de France	—
Vuelta a España	141

Legend
—	Did not compete
DNF	Did not finish
