= Brian van Goethem =

Dutch road cyclist (born 1991)

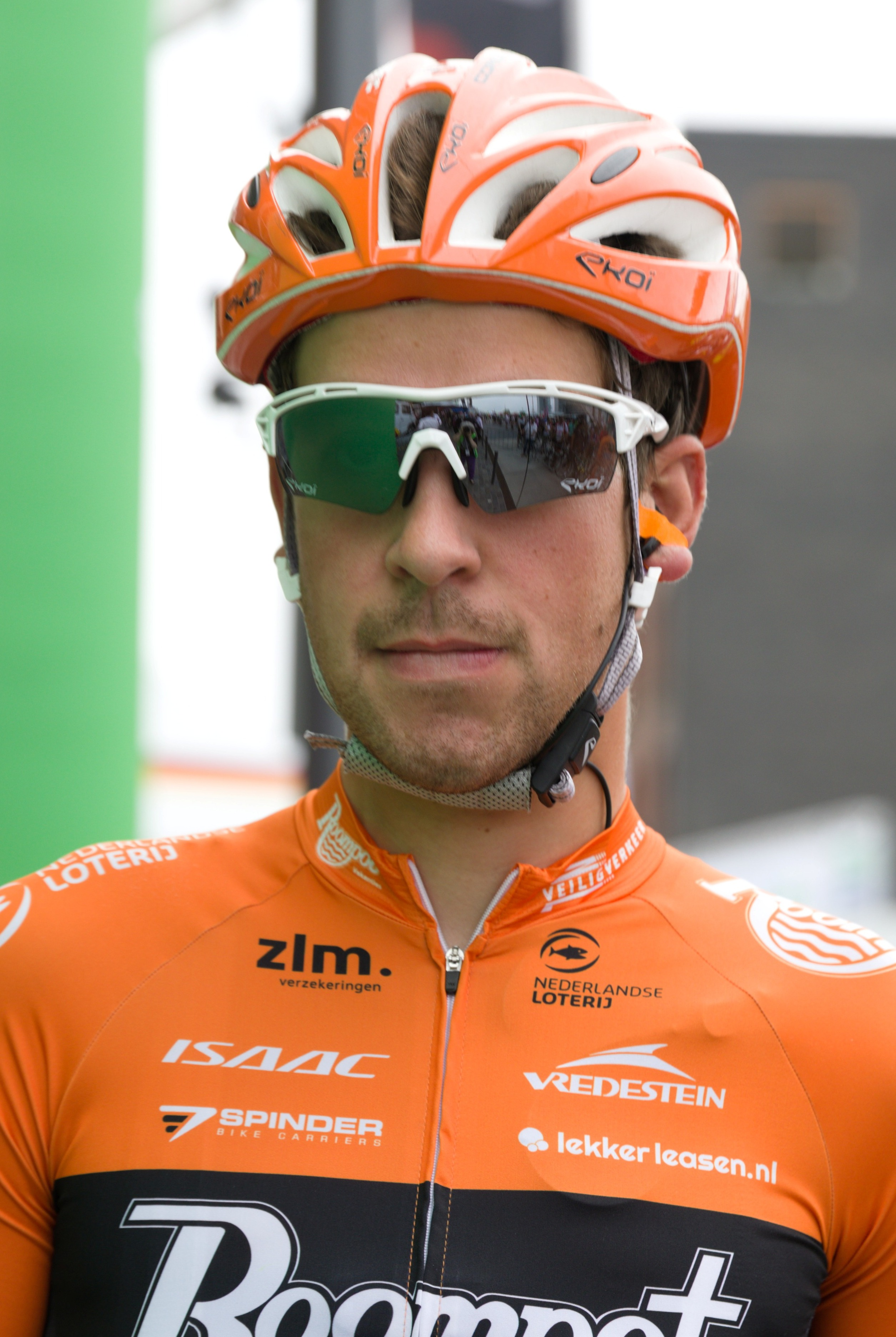
- Van Goethem in 2018.

Personal information
- Full name: Brian van Goethem
- Born: 16 April 1991 (age 35) Sluiskil, Netherlands
- Height: 1.86 m (6 ft 1 in)
- Weight: 77 kg (170 lb)

Cycling career
- Sport: Cycling
- Current team: Retired
- Discipline: Road
- Role: Rider

Amateur team
- 2010–2012: TML Dommelstreek

Professional teams
- 2013–2014: Metec–TKH
- 2015–2018: Team Roompot
- 2019–2020: Lotto–Soudal

Brian van Goethem (born 16 April 1991) is a Dutch former professional racing cyclist, who rode professionally between 2013 and 2020, for the Metec–TKH, Roompot–Nederlandse Loterij and Lotto–Soudal teams. In August 2019, he was named in the startlist for the 2019 Vuelta a España.

== Major results ==
2013
1st Zuid Oost Drenthe Classic II
3rd De Kustpijl
6th Zuid Oost Drenthe Classic I
2014
1st Stage 1 (TTT) Czech Cycling Tour
3rd Ster van Zwolle
4th Overall Tour de Gironde
5th Duo Normand (with Peter Koning)
8th Ronde van Drenthe
9th Overall Olympia's Tour
2016
6th Schaal Sels
2017
3rd Omloop van het Houtland
9th Arnhem–Veenendaal Classic

=== Grand Tour general classification results timeline ===
| Grand Tour | 2019 |
|---|---|
| Giro d'Italia | — |
| Tour de France | — |
| Vuelta a España | DNF |

Legend
| — | Did not compete |
| DNF | Did not finish |
