= Aqua Blue Sport =

Team information
- UCI code: ABS
- Registered: Ireland
- Founded: 2017
- Disbanded: 2019
- Discipline: Road
- Status: UCI Professional Continental
- Bicycles: Ridley (2017); 3T (2018)
- Website: Team home page

Key personnel
- General manager: Stephen Moore
- Team managers: Nicki Sørensen; Bob de Cnodder; Martyn Irvine

Team name history
- 2017–2018: Aqua Blue Sport

Aqua Blue Sport was an Irish UCI Professional Continental cycling team founded in January 2017 which folded at the end of the 2018 season.

== History ==
The team was set up by businessman Rick Delaney, assuring funding for at least four seasons with two-year rolling contracts offered to the riders. The project was based on a self-sustaining finance model, with revenue generated from an online cycling marketplace www.aquabluesport.com being used to fund the professional team.

Aqua Blue Sport featured a 16-rider roster for 2017. Having gained considerable success in the early months of its maiden season, Aqua Blue Sport was invited to the 2017 Vuelta a España. Despite losing their team bus to an arson attack, the team continued at the Vuelta. On stage 17 of their first Grand Tour, Stefan Denifl crossed the finish line first, ahead of Alberto Contador at the summit finish of Los Machucos, however his win was later stripped after he confessed to blood doping. In its first year, the team won its first individual stage, its first national champion, its first overall at a stage race, and its first stage at a Grand Tour (although the latter two were later stripped as a result of Denifl's doping admission).

On August 27, 2018, the team announced that it would not be racing in 2019, citing difficulties in obtaining race invitations from race organizers and a failed merger with the Vérandas Willems–Crelan team. and ceased racing immediately.

== Team roster ==
As of 5 January 2018.

Rider	Date of birth
Shane Archbold (NZL)	2 February 1989 (aged 28)
Adam Blythe (GBR)	1 October 1989 (aged 28)
Matt Brammeier (IRL)	7 June 1985 (aged 32)
Mark Christian (GBR)	20 November 1990 (aged 27)
Stefan Denifl (AUT)	22 September 1987 (aged 30)
Eddie Dunbar (IRL)	1 September 1996 (aged 21)
Conor Dunne (IRL)	22 January 1992 (aged 25)
Andrew Fenn (GBR)	1 July 1990 (aged 27)

Rider	Date of birth
Aaron Gate (NZL)	26 November 1990 (aged 27)
Lasse Norman Hansen (DNK)	11 February 1992 (aged 25)
Peter Koning (NED)	3 December 1990 (aged 27)
Michel Kreder (NED)	15 August 1987 (aged 30)
Daniel Pearson (GBR)	26 February 1994 (aged 23)
Casper Pedersen (DEN)	15 March 1996 (aged 21)
Larry Warbasse (USA)	28 June 1990 (aged 27)
Calvin Watson (AUS)	6 January 1993 (aged 24)

== Major wins ==
2017
Stage 4 Tour de Suisse, Larry Warbasse
United States Road Race Championships, Larry Warbasse
~~Overall Tour of Austria, Stefan Denifl~~
~~Stage 17 Vuelta a España, Stefan Denifl~~

2018
Stage 1 Herald Sun Tour, Lasse Norman Hansen
Elfstedenronde, Adam Blythe
Ireland Road Race Championships, Conor Dunne
Stage 1 Danmark Rundt, Lasse Norman Hansen

=== Supplementary statistics ===
Grand Tours by highest finishing position
Race	2017	2018
Giro d'Italia	–	–
Tour de France	–	–
Vuelta a España	128 (Note: Stefan Denifl originally placed in 58th but after confessing to doping his results were annulled.)	–
Major week-long stage races by highest finishing position
Race	2017	2018
Tour Down Under	–	–
Paris–Nice	–	–
Tirreno–Adriatico	–	–
Volta a Catalunya	–	–
Tour of the Basque Country	–	–
Tour of the Alps	73	–
Tour de Romandie	–	–
Critérium du Dauphiné	–	–
Tour de Suisse	39	41
Tour de Pologne	–	–
Benelux Tour	–	–
Monument races by highest finishing position
Monument	2017	2018
Milan–San Remo	–	–
Tour of Flanders	–	–
Paris–Roubaix	–	–
Liège–Bastogne–Liège	32	66
Giro di Lombardia	–	–
Classics by highest finishing position
Classic	2017	2018
Omloop Het Nieuwsblad	58	–
Kuurne–Brussels–Kuurne	–	–
Strade Bianche	–	–
E3 Harelbeke	–	–
Gent–Wevelgem	–	–
Amstel Gold Race	–	59
La Flèche Wallonne	105	–
Clásica de San Sebastián	–	–

Legend
—	Did not compete
DNF	Did not finish
DNS	Did not start

== National champions ==
2017
American Road Race, Larry Warbasse
2018
Irish Road Race, Conor Dunne
