= 2015 Cult Energy Pro Cycling season =

Cult Energy Pro Cycling
- 2015 season
- UCI code: CUL
- Status: UCI Professional Continental
- Manager: Christa Skelde
- Main sponsor(s): Cult
- Based: Denmark
- Bicycles: Ridley

Season victories
- One-day races: 1
- Stage race overall: 1
- Stage race stages: 1
- National Championships: 1

The 2015 season for the Cult Energy Pro Cycling cycling team began in January at the Trofeo Santanyi-Ses Salines-Campos. The team participated in UCI Continental Circuits and UCI World Tour events when given a wildcard invitation.

== 2015 roster ==
Rider	Date of birth
Michael Carbel (DEN)	7 February 1995 (age 30)
Russell Downing (GBR)	23 August 1978 (age 46)
Linus Gerdemann (GER)	16 September 1982 (age 42)
Rasmus Guldhammer (DEN)	9 March 1989 (age 36)
Karel Hnik (CZE)	9 August 1991 (age 33)
Alex Kirsch (LUX)	12 June 1992 (age 32)
Gustav Larsson (SWE)	20 September 1980 (age 44)
Romain Lemarchand (FRA)	26 July 1987 (age 37)

Rider	Date of birth
Christian Mager (GER)	8 April 1992 (age 32)
Martin Mortensen (DEN)	11 May 1984 (age 40)
Mads Pedersen (DEN)	18 December 1995 (age 29)
Rasmus Quaade (DEN)	7 January 1990 (age 35)
Michael Reihs (DEN)	25 April 1979 (age 45)
Troels Vinther (DEN)	24 February 1987 (age 38)
Fabian Wegmann (GER)	20 June 1980 (age 44)
Joel Zangerle (LUX)	11 October 1988 (age 36)

Riders who joined the team for the 2015 season

Rider	2014 team
Michael Carbel	neo-pro (Cult Energy–Vital Water)
Russell Downing	NFTO
Linus Gerdemann	MTN–Qhubeka
Rasmus Guldhammer	Tre For-Blue Water
Karel Hnik	neo-pro (Etixx)
Alex Kirsch	neo-pro (Leopard Development)
Gustav Larsson	IAM Cycling
Romain Lemarchand	Cofidis
Christian Mager	neo-pro (Team Stölting)
Martin Mortensen	Cult Energy–Vital Water
Mads Pedersen	neo-pro (Cult Energy–Vital Water)
Rasmus Quaade	neo-pro (Tre For-Blue Water)
Michael Reihs	Cult Energy–Vital Water
Troels Vinther	Cult Energy–Vital Water
Fabian Wegmann	Garmin–Sharp
Joel Zangerle	neo-pro (Leopard Development)

== Season victories ==
Date	Race	Competition	Rider	Country	Location
24 May	Tour of Norway, Teams classification	UCI Europe Tour	(Note: The riders on the squad were Linus Gerdemann, Rasmus Guldhammer, Karel Hnik, Gustav Larsson, Michael Reihs and Fabian Wegmann)	Norway	
5 June	Tour de Luxembourg, Stage 2	UCI Europe Tour	Linus Gerdemann (GER)	Luxembourg	Walferdange
7 June	Tour de Luxembourg, Overall	UCI Europe Tour	Linus Gerdemann (GER)	Luxembourg	
14 June	Velothon Wales	UCI Europe Tour	Martin Mortensen (DEN)	United Kingdom	Cardiff

== National, Continental and World champions 2015 ==
Date	Discipline	Jersey	Rider	Country	Location
25 June	Sweden National Time Trial Champion		Gustav Larsson (SWE)	Sweden	Sollerö
