= Thomas Guldhammer =

Danish cyclist

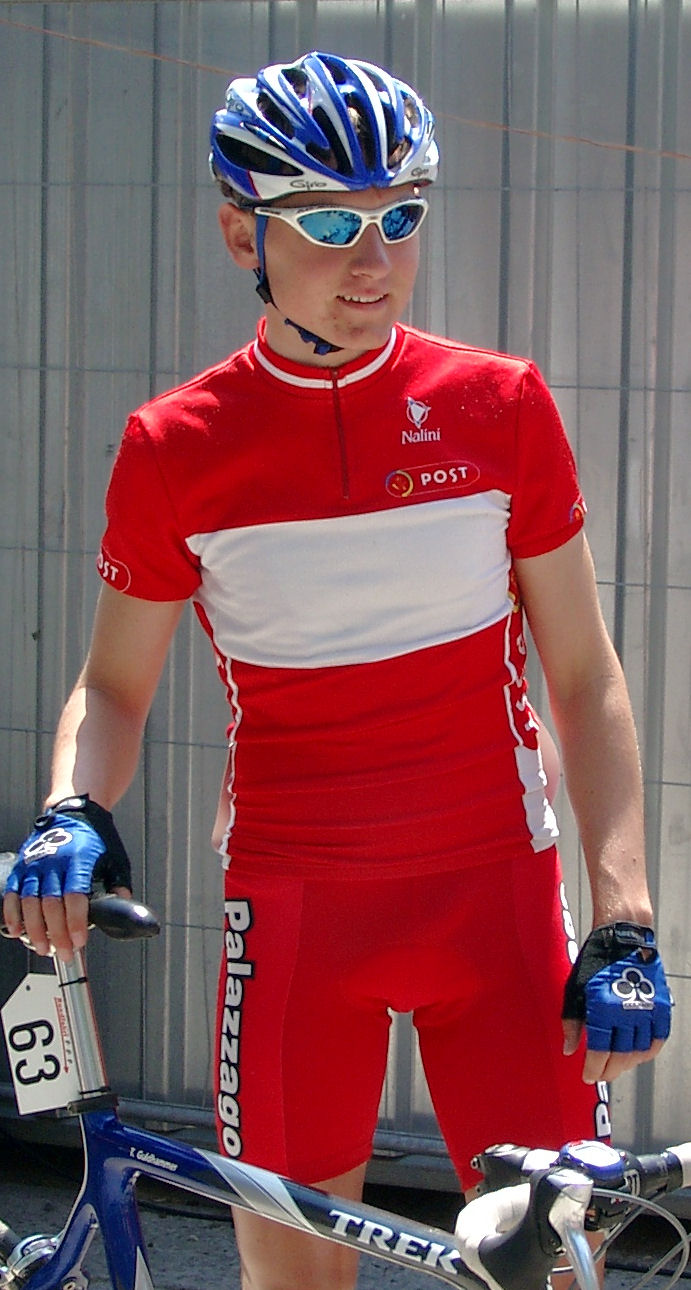

Personal information
- Full name: Thomas Guldhammer
- Born: 31 July 1987 (age 39) Vejle, Denmark

Cycling career
- Sport: Cycling
- Current team: Retired
- Discipline: Road
- Role: Rider

Amateur team
- 2014–2018: Vejle Cykel Klub

Professional teams
- 2006: Glud & Marstrand–Horsens
- 2007–2008: Team Designa Køkken
- 2009: Team Capinordic
- 2010: Energi Fyn
- 2011: Concordia Forsikring–Himmerland
- 2012–2013: Team TreFor

Thomas Guldhammer (born 31 July 1987) is a Danish former professional cyclist. His brother Rasmus Guldhammer also competed professionally as a cyclist.

== Major results ==
2005
1st Trofeo Emilio Paganessi
National Junior Road Championships

2nd Time trial
2nd Road race

2nd Overall Grand Prix Rüebliland

1st Stage 1

3rd Overall Grand Prix Général Patton
2007
3rd Fyen Rundt
4th Duo Normand
2008
1st Stage 2 Boucle de l'Artois
2009
8th GP Herning
10th Paris-Roubaix Espoirs
2010
2nd Skive–Løbet
7th Fyen Rundt
2011
6th Himmerland Rundt
2012
1st Stage 4 Randers Bike Week
