= Michael Valgren =

Danish cyclist

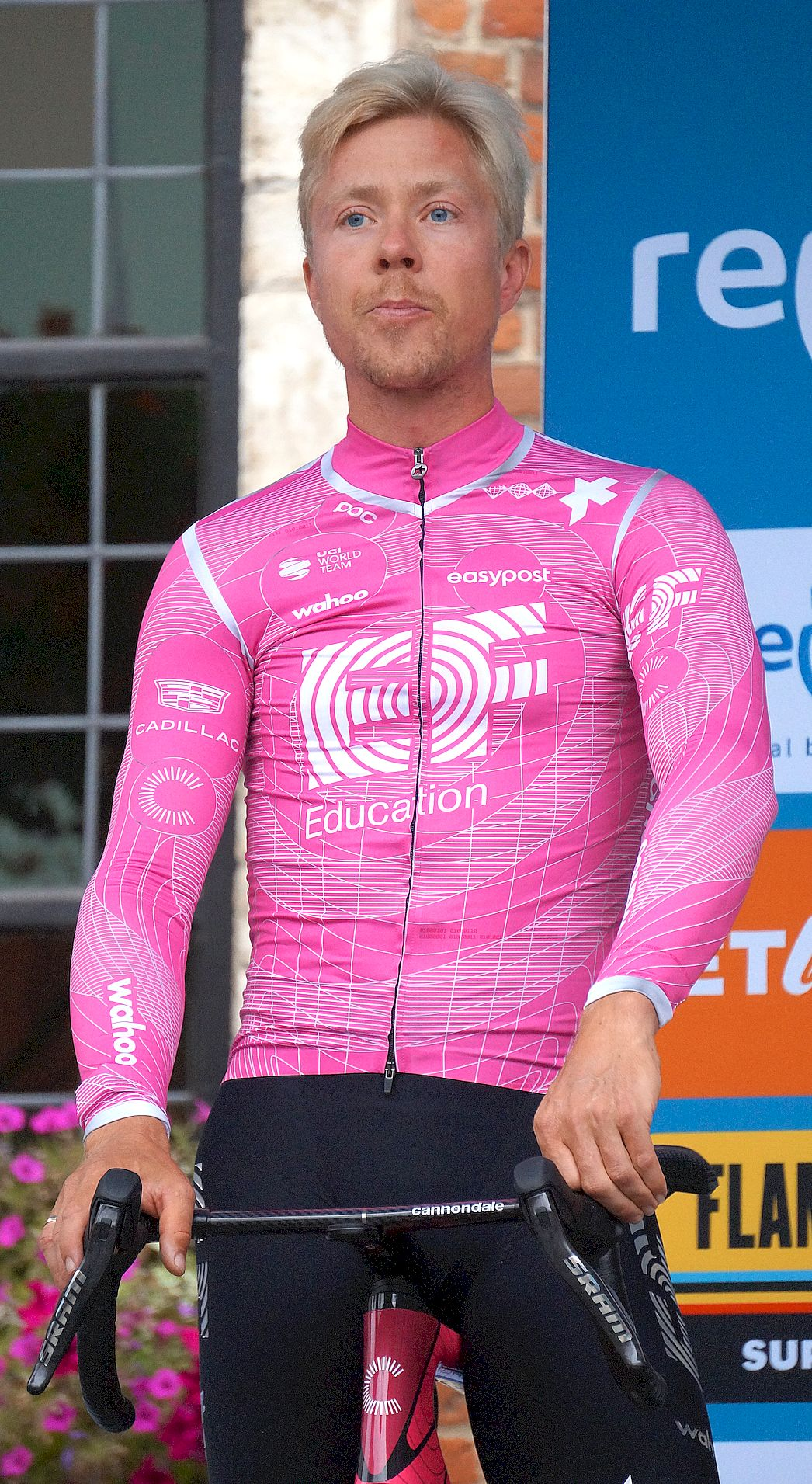
- Valgren in 2026

Personal information
- Full name: Michael Valgren Hundahl
- Born: Michael Valgren Andersen; 7 February 1992 (age 34) Østerild, Denmark
- Height: 1.79 m (5 ft 10 1/2 in)
- Weight: 71 kg (157 lb; 11 st 3 lb)

Cycling career
- Sport: Cycling
- Current team: EF Education–EasyPost
- Discipline: Road
- Role: Puncheur; Classics specialist

Professional teams
- 2011–2013: Glud & Marstrand–LRØ
- 2014–2016: Tinkoff–Saxo
- 2017–2018: Astana
- 2019–2020: Team Dimension Data
- 2021–2022: EF Education–Nippo
- 2023: EF Education–Nippo Development Team
- 2024–: EF Education–EasyPost

Major wins
- Grand Tours Giro d'Italia 1 individual stage (2026) Stage races Danmark Rundt (2014, 2016) One-day races and Classics National Road Race Championships (2014) Amstel Gold Race (2018) Omloop Het Nieuwsblad (2018) Coppa Sabatini (2021)
Medal record
Representing Denmark
Men's road cycling
World Championships
Bronze medal – third place	2021 Flanders	Road race

Michael Valgren Hundahl (né Andersen; born 7 February 1992) is a Danish professional road racing cyclist, who currently rides for UCI WorldTeam EF Education–EasyPost. In 2018, Valgren won Omloop Het Nieuwsblad and the Amstel Gold Race. In 2026 he won stage 17 of the Giro d'Italia, marking a comeback from injury.

== Career ==
He became a professional in 2011 at the age of just 19 riding for the Danish continental team Glud & Marstrand–LRØ, where he won two editions of the U23 Liège–Bastogne–Liège and had several other noticeable wins. He worked in the same fish factory as Jonas Vingegaard while pursuing a career as a pro cyclist.

In 2014 he entered the WorldTour, when he joined Tinkoff–Saxo. He made an immediate impact, as he won the Danish National Road Race Championships and the Danmark Rundt. 2018 served as a breakout year seeing him win the classics Omloop Het Nieuwsblad and the Amstel Gold Race.

In November 2020, Valgren signed a two-year contract with the EF Education–Nippo team. He was added to the start list of the Tour de France for the 7th time in his career in 2021. In September, he won the Coppa Sabatini and the Giro della Toscana one-day races as well as the bronze medal in the UCI World road race championships.

At the Route d'Occitanie in June 2022, Valgren was badly injured in a crash, sustaining a fractured pelvis, dislocated hip, injuries to the ACL and MCL and a damaged meniscus. He was unable to race for the rest of the year, and moved down to the EF Education–Nippo Development Team the following year as he transitioned back to racing. He returned to competition on April 30, 2023, and soon after announced he would rejoin the World Tour squad the following year.

Valgren won stage 17 of the 2026 Giro d'Italia, attacking from the breakaway just over a kilometre from the finish line. This was his first grand tour victory, and he dedicated the win to his son who had made him a lucky charm for the race.

Valgren was selected for the 2026 Tour de France.

== Major results ==
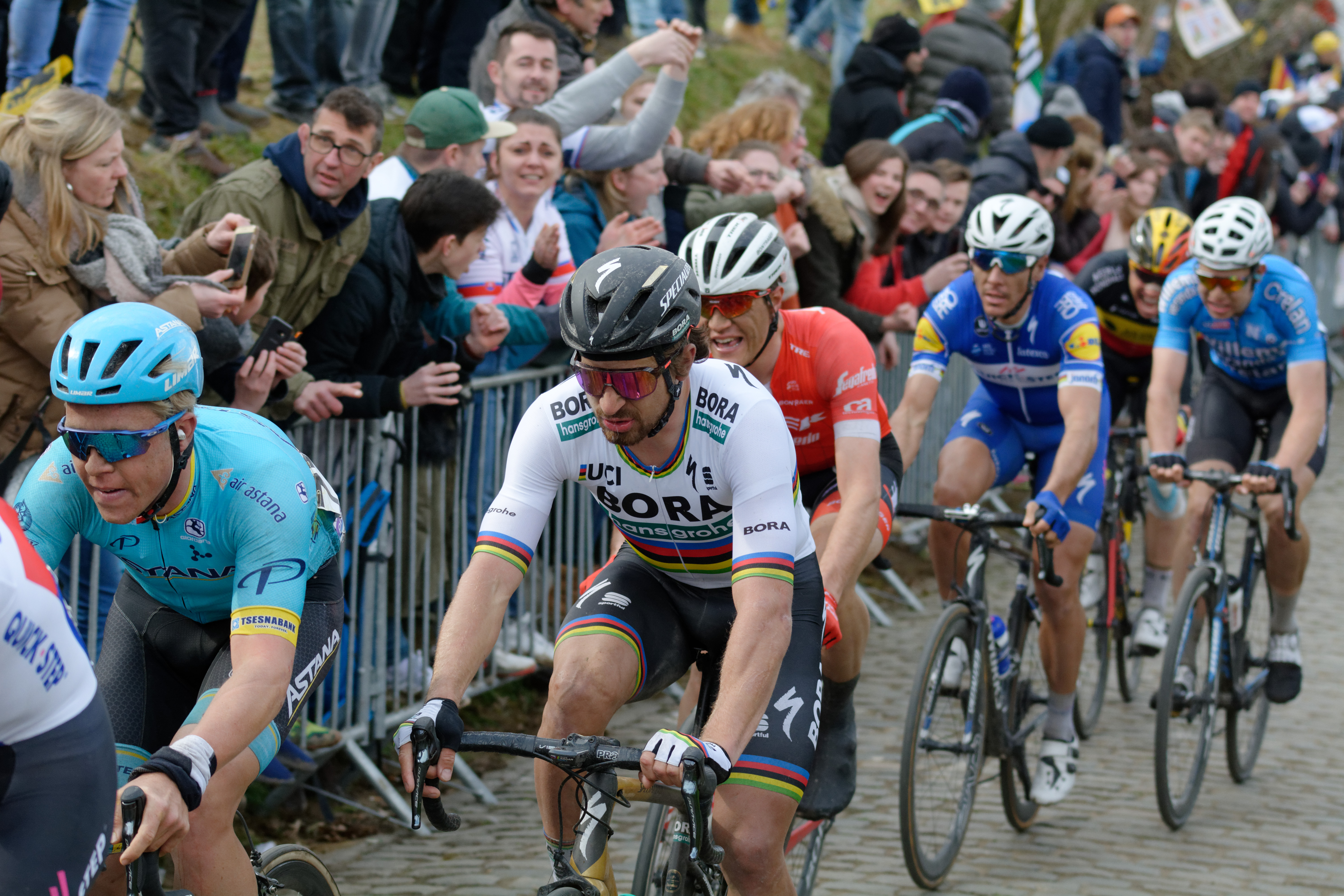
Valgren (front) riding in the 2018 Tour of Flanders

2009
2nd Time trial, National Junior Road Championships
3rd Overall GP Général Patton

1st Stage 1

6th Overall Trofeo Karlsberg
8th Overall Niedersachsen-Rundfahrt der Junioren
2010
National Junior Road Championships

2nd Time trial
3rd Road race

10th Overall Liège–La Gleize
10th Time trial, UCI Juniors Road World Championships
2011
4th Himmerland Rundt
2012
1st Liège–Bastogne–Liège Espoirs
2nd Eschborn–Frankfurt City Loop U23
6th Overall Kreiz Breizh Elites
8th Overall Coupe des nations Ville Saguenay
2013
1st Overall Flèche du Sud

1st Young rider classification
1st Stage 3

1st Liège–Bastogne–Liège Espoirs
1st Stage 3 Tour de l'Avenir
2nd Eschborn–Frankfurt City Loop U23
9th Overall Thüringen Rundfahrt der U23
10th GP Herning
2014 (2 pro wins)
National Road Championships

1st Road race
3rd Time trial

1st Overall Danmark Rundt

1st Young rider classification

3rd Overall Four Days of Dunkirk
4th Overall Tour des Fjords
4th Japan Cup
2015
1st Young rider classification, Dubai Tour
2016 (2)
1st Overall Danmark Rundt

1st Stage 3

National Road Championships

2nd Road race
2nd Time trial

2nd Amstel Gold Race
2017
2nd Overall Danmark Rundt
6th Overall BinckBank Tour
6th E3 Harelbeke
2018 (2)
1st Amstel Gold Race
1st Omloop Het Nieuwsblad
2nd Bretagne Classic
4th Tour of Flanders
7th Road race, UCI Road World Championships
8th Grand Prix Cycliste de Montréal
9th Grand Prix Cycliste de Québec
2019
4th Bretagne Classic
5th Grand Prix Cycliste de Montréal
6th Road race, UCI Road World Championships
6th Chrono des Nations
10th Overall BinckBank Tour
2021 (2)
1st Coppa Sabatini
1st Giro della Toscana
3rd Road race, UCI Road World Championships
4th Road race, National Road Championships
2023
3rd GP Herning
8th Coppa Sabatini
9th Japan Cup
2024
4th Road race, National Road Championships
8th Dwars door Vlaanderen
2025
8th Strade Bianche
2026 (2)
1st Stage 17 Giro d'Italia
1st Stage 5 Tirreno–Adriatico

=== Grand Tour general classification results timeline ===
Grand Tour	2014	2015	2016	2017	2018	2019	2020	2021	2022	2023	2024	2025	2026
Giro d'Italia	—	—	—	—	—	—	—	—	—	—	38	—	DNF
Tour de France	—	DNF	77	61	44	75	73	53	—	—	—	72	
Vuelta a España	128	—	—	—	—	—	33	—	—	—	—	—	

=== Classics results timeline ===
Monument	2014	2015	2016	2017	2018	2019	2020	2021	2022	2023	2024	2025	2026
Milan–San Remo	—	—	—	35	97	—	99	52	25	—	100	—	30
Tour of Flanders	—	—	—	11	4	102	21	DNF	36	—	45	—	18
Paris–Roubaix	—	—	—	—	—	—	NH	DNF	—	—	—	—	—
Liège–Bastogne–Liège	DNF	DNF	14	—	19	DNF	DNF	58	—	—	—	—	—
Giro di Lombardia	—	—	—	—	—	40	—	—	—	—	—	—	
Classic	2014	2015	2016	2017	2018	2019	2020	2021	2022	2023	2024	2025	2026
Omloop Het Nieuwsblad	—	—	—	30	1	45	21	—	DNF	—	67	132	—
Strade Bianche	—	—	—	36	—	45	30	—	11	—	—	8	13
E3 Harelbeke	—	—	—	6	14	39	NH	—	20	—	73	—	11
Gent–Wevelgem	—	—	—	33	26	DNF	93	—	35	—	36	—	112
Dwars door Vlaanderen	—	—	—	—	DNF	29	NH	45	73	—	8	—	33
Amstel Gold Race	123	22	2	35	1	53	NH	13	15	—	—	—	—
Bretagne Classic	—	45	16	33	2	4	—	22	—	—	43	66	
Grand Prix Cycliste de Québec	—	125	99	—	9	19	Not held		—	—	111	—	
Grand Prix Cycliste de Montréal	—	33	23	—	8	5	Not held		—	—	DNF	—	

Legend
—	Did not compete
DNF	Did not finish
NH	Not held
