= Patrick Clausen =

Danish cyclist

Personal information
- Born: 2 July 1990 (age 36) Hvidovre, Denmark

Cycling career
- Sport: Cycling
- Current team: Retired
- Discipline: Road
- Role: Rider

Amateur team
- 2009–2011: Biketoyz U23

Professional teams
- 2012–2013: Glud & Marstrand–LRØ
- 2014–2015: Team TreFor–Blue Water
- 2016–2018: Riwal Platform
- 2019: Team Waoo

Patrick Clausen (born 2 July 1990) is a Danish former professional racing cyclist.

== Major results ==
2006
1st Sprint, National Junior Track Championships
2011
9th Rund um den Finanzplatz Eschborn-Frankfurt U23
2012
1st Stage 5 Flèche du Sud
2nd Dorpenomloop Rucphen
7th Overall Coupe des nations Ville Saguenay
9th Himmerland Rundt
2013
1st Skive–Løbet
2014
2nd Kernen Omloop Echt-Susteren
6th Tour of Yancheng Coastal Wetlands
7th Overall Tour of Taihu Lake
7th Destination Thy
2015
4th Velothon Stockholm
6th Fyen Rundt
2017
1st Stage 3 Randers Bike Week
8th Scandinavian Race Uppsala
10th Fyen Rundt
2018
6th Skive–Løbet
7th Overall Tour du Loir-et-Cher
