= 2014 Danmark Rundt =

2014 UCI Europe Tour
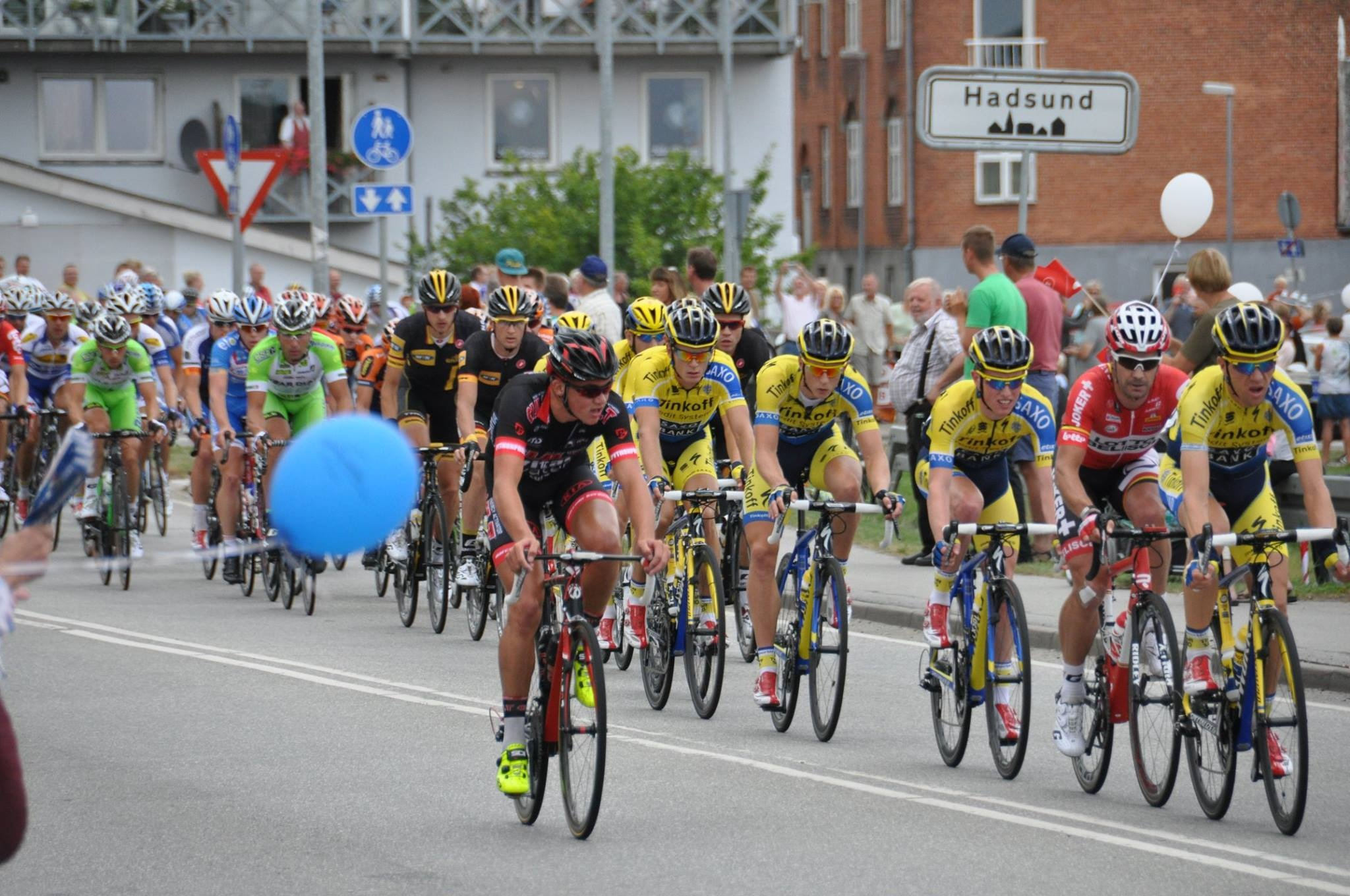
- The race in Hadsund

Race details
- Dates: 6–10 August 2014
- Stages: 6
- Distance: 815 km (506 mi)
- Winning time: 18h 52' 22"

Results
Jersey awarded to the overall winner	Winner	Michael Valgren (DEN)	(Tinkoff–Saxo)
	Second	Lars Bak (DEN)	(Lotto–Belisol)
	Third	Manuele Boaro (ITA)	(Tinkoff–Saxo)
Jersey awarded to the points classification winner	Points	Alexey Lutsenko (KAZ)	(Astana)
Jersey awarded to the mountains classification winner	Mountains	John Murphy (USA)	(UnitedHealthcare)
Jersey awarded to the young rider classification winner	Young rider	Michael Valgren (DEN)	(Tinkoff–Saxo)
	Team	Tinkoff–Saxo	

The 2014 Post Danmark Rundt was a men's road bicycle race held from 6 to 10 August 2014. It was the 24th edition of the men's stage race, which was established in 1985. The race was rated as a 2.HC event and formed part of the 2014 UCI Europe Tour. The race was made up of six stages over five days and covered a total of 815 kilometres (506 mi), including an individual time trial. It featured 14 teams, including three UCI ProTeams.

The race was won by Danish rider Michael Valgren of Tinkoff–Saxo by 15 seconds from fellow Dane Lars Bak of Lotto–Belisol, who finished second for the second year in succession. Valgren's team-mate, Italian rider Manuele Boaro, finished in third place, a further two seconds behind. Valgren also won the young riders award as a result of his overall victory.

The points classification was won by Alexey Lutsenko with 31 points, with John Murphy winning the mountains classification. Danish rider Rasmus Quaade won the most aggressive rider award, while Tinkoff–Saxo won the teams classification ahead of Lotto–Belisol and Cult Energy–Vital Water.

== Teams ==
A total of 14 teams raced in the 2014 Danmark Rundt: 3 UCI ProTeams, 7 UCI Professional Continental Teams, 3 UCI Continental Teams along with a Danish national team under the Team Post Danmark name.

- Astana
- Bardiani–CSF
- Cult Energy–Vital Water
- Denmark (national team)
- Lotto–Belisol
- MTN–Qhubeka
- NetApp–Endura
- Team Novo Nordisk
- Riwal Cycling Team
- Tinkoff–Saxo
- Topsport Vlaanderen–Baloise
- Team TreFor–Blue Water
- UnitedHealthcare
- Wanty–Groupe Gobert

== Route ==
Stage characteristics and winners
Stage	Date	Course	Distance	Type	Winner
1	6 August	Hobro to Mariager	155 km (96 mi)	Flat stage	Magnus Cort (DEN)
2	7 August	Skive to Aarhus	195 km (121 mi)	Flat stage	Andrea Guardini (ITA)
3	8 August	Skanderborg to Vejle	175 km (109 mi)	Flat stage	Manuele Boaro (ITA)
4	9 August	Nyborg to Odense	100 km (62 mi)	Flat stage	Andrea Guardini (ITA)
5	9 August	Middelfart	15 km (9 mi)	Individual time trial	Alexey Lutsenko (KAZ)
6	10 August	Kalundborg to Frederiksberg	175 km (109 mi)	Flat stage	Nicola Boem (ITA)

== Stages ==
=== Stage 1 ===
6 August 2014 — Hobro to Mariager, 155 km (96 mi)

Stage 1 result
Rank	Rider	Team	Time
1	Magnus Cort (DNK)	Cult Energy–Vital Water	3h 33' 39"
2	Jasper De Buyst (BEL)	Topsport Vlaanderen–Baloise	+ 0"
3	Valerio Agnoli (ITA)	Astana	+ 0"
4	Tom Van Asbroeck (BEL)	Topsport Vlaanderen–Baloise	+ 0"
5	Nicola Ruffoni (ITA)	Bardiani–CSF	+ 0"
6	Sean De Bie (BEL)	Lotto–Belisol	+ 0"
7	Andrea Piechele (ITA)	Bardiani–CSF	+ 0"
8	Marko Kump (SLO)	Tinkoff–Saxo	+ 0"
9	Tosh Van der Sande (BEL)	Lotto–Belisol	+ 0"
10	Nicolai Brøchner (DNK)	Denmark (national team)	+ 0"

General classification after stage 1
Rank	Rider	Team	Time
1	Magnus Cort (DNK)	Cult Energy–Vital Water	3h 33' 29"
2	Jasper De Buyst (BEL)	Topsport Vlaanderen–Baloise	+ 2"
3	Valerio Agnoli (ITA)	Astana	+ 6"
4	Tom Van Asbroeck (BEL)	Topsport Vlaanderen–Baloise	+ 7"
5	Lars Bak (DNK)	Lotto–Belisol	+ 9"
6	Nicola Ruffoni (ITA)	Bardiani–CSF	+ 10"
7	Sean De Bie (BEL)	Lotto–Belisol	+ 10"
8	Andrea Piechele (ITA)	Bardiani–CSF	+ 10"
9	Marko Kump (SLO)	Tinkoff–Saxo	+ 10"
10	Tosh Van der Sande (BEL)	Lotto–Belisol	+ 10"

=== Stage 2 ===
7 August 2014 — Skive to Aarhus, 195 km (121 mi)

Stage 2 result
Rank	Rider	Team	Time
1	Andrea Guardini (ITA)	Astana	4h 42' 57"
2	Gerald Ciolek (DEU)	MTN–Qhubeka	+ 0"
3	Matti Breschel (DNK)	Tinkoff–Saxo	+ 0"
4	Daniel Schorn (AUT)	NetApp–Endura	+ 0"
5	Morten Øllegaard (DNK)	Riwal Cycling Team	+ 0"
6	Nicola Ruffoni (ITA)	Bardiani–CSF	+ 0"
7	Danilo Napolitano (ITA)	Wanty–Groupe Gobert	+ 0"
8	Tom Van Asbroeck (BEL)	Topsport Vlaanderen–Baloise	+ 0"
9	Filippo Fortin (ITA)	Bardiani–CSF	+ 0"
10	Tosh Van der Sande (BEL)	Lotto–Belisol	+ 0"

General classification after stage 2
Rank	Rider	Team	Time
1	Magnus Cort (DNK)	Cult Energy–Vital Water	8h 16' 25"
2	Jasper De Buyst (BEL)	Topsport Vlaanderen–Baloise	+ 3"
3	Gerald Ciolek (DEU)	MTN–Qhubeka	+ 5"
4	Valerio Agnoli (ITA)	Astana	+ 7"
5	Tom Van Asbroeck (BEL)	Topsport Vlaanderen–Baloise	+ 8"
6	Sean De Bie (BEL)	Lotto–Belisol	+ 8"
7	Lars Bak (DNK)	Lotto–Belisol	+ 10"
8	Nicola Ruffoni (ITA)	Bardiani–CSF	+ 11"
9	Daniel Schorn (AUT)	NetApp–Endura	+ 11"
10	Tosh Van der Sande (BEL)	Lotto–Belisol	+ 11"

=== Stage 3 ===
8 August 2014 — Skanderborg to Vejle, 175 km (109 mi)

Stage 3 result
Rank	Rider	Team	Time
1	Manuele Boaro (ITA)	Tinkoff–Saxo	4h 18' 33"
2	Matti Breschel (DNK)	Tinkoff–Saxo	+ 12"
3	Tiesj Benoot (BEL)	Lotto–Belisol	+ 12"
4	Jonas Aaen Jørgensen (DNK)	Riwal Cycling Team	+ 12"
5	Rasmus Guldhammer (DNK)	Team TreFor–Blue Water	+ 14"
6	Lars Bak (DNK)	Lotto–Belisol	+ 14"
7	Daniel Schorn (AUT)	NetApp–Endura	+ 14"
8	Sean De Bie (BEL)	Lotto–Belisol	+ 14"
9	Valerio Agnoli (ITA)	Astana	+ 14"
10	Christopher Juul-Jensen (DNK)	Tinkoff–Saxo	+ 14"

General classification after stage 3
Rank	Rider	Team	Time
1	Manuele Boaro (ITA)	Tinkoff–Saxo	12h 34' 59"
2	Tiesj Benoot (BEL)	Lotto–Belisol	+ 18"
3	Valerio Agnoli (ITA)	Astana	+ 20"
4	Sean De Bie (BEL)	Lotto–Belisol	+ 21"
5	Jasper De Buyst (BEL)	Topsport Vlaanderen–Baloise	+ 22"
6	Jonas Aaen Jørgensen (DNK)	Riwal Cycling Team	+ 22"
7	Lars Bak (DNK)	Lotto–Belisol	+ 23"
8	Daniel Schorn (AUT)	NetApp–Endura	+ 24"
9	Rasmus Guldhammer (DNK)	Team TreFor–Blue Water	+ 24"
10	Tim De Troyer (BEL)	Wanty–Groupe Gobert	+ 24"

=== Stage 4 ===
9 August 2014 — Nyborg to Odense, 100 km (62 mi)

Stage 4 result
Rank	Rider	Team	Time
1	Andrea Guardini (ITA)	Astana	2h 08' 27"
2	Tom Van Asbroeck (BEL)	Topsport Vlaanderen–Baloise	+ 0"
3	Filippo Fortin (ITA)	Bardiani–CSF	+ 0"
4	Jasper De Buyst (BEL)	Topsport Vlaanderen–Baloise	+ 0"
5	Alessandro Bazzana (ITA)	UnitedHealthcare	+ 0"
6	Nicola Ruffoni (ITA)	Bardiani–CSF	+ 0"
7	Alexey Lutsenko (KAZ)	Astana	+ 0"
8	Danilo Napolitano (ITA)	Wanty–Groupe Gobert	+ 0"
9	Andrea Piechele (ITA)	Bardiani–CSF	+ 0"
10	Daniel Foder (DNK)	Team TreFor–Blue Water	+ 0"

General classification after stage 4
Rank	Rider	Team	Time
1	Manuele Boaro (ITA)	Tinkoff–Saxo	14h 43' 26"
2	Tiesj Benoot (BEL)	Lotto–Belisol	+ 18"
3	Sean De Bie (BEL)	Lotto–Belisol	+ 21"
4	Jasper De Buyst (BEL)	Topsport Vlaanderen–Baloise	+ 22"
5	Jonas Aaen Jørgensen (DNK)	Riwal Cycling Team	+ 22"
6	Tom Van Asbroeck (BEL)	Topsport Vlaanderen–Baloise	+ 23"
7	Lars Bak (DNK)	Lotto–Belisol	+ 23"
8	Rasmus Guldhammer (DNK)	Team TreFor–Blue Water	+ 24"
9	Daniel Schorn (AUT)	NetApp–Endura	+ 24"
10	Christopher Juul-Jensen (DNK)	Tinkoff–Saxo	+ 24"

=== Stage 5 ===
9 August 2014 — Middelfart, 15 km (9 mi), individual time trial (ITT)

Stage 5 result
Rank	Rider	Team	Time
1	Alexey Lutsenko (KAZ)	Astana	18' 37"
2	Rasmus Quaade (DNK)	Team TreFor–Blue Water	+ 1"
3	Christopher Juul-Jensen (DNK)	Tinkoff–Saxo	+ 9"
4	Søren Kragh Andersen (DNK)	Team TreFor–Blue Water	+ 12"
5	Sean De Bie (BEL)	Lotto–Belisol	+ 14"
6	Michael Valgren (DNK)	Tinkoff–Saxo	+ 17"
7	Alex Rasmussen (DNK)	Riwal Cycling Team	+ 20"
8	Manuele Boaro (ITA)	Tinkoff–Saxo	+ 20"
9	Ignatas Konovalovas (LTU)	MTN–Qhubeka	+ 23"
10	Mads Pedersen (DNK)	Cult Energy–Vital Water	+ 31"

General classification after stage 5
Rank	Rider	Team	Time
1	Manuele Boaro (ITA)	Tinkoff–Saxo	15h 02' 23"
2	Alexey Lutsenko (KAZ)	Astana	+ 10"
3	Christopher Juul-Jensen (DNK)	Tinkoff–Saxo	+ 13"
4	Sean De Bie (BEL)	Lotto–Belisol	+ 15"
5	Michael Valgren (DNK)	Tinkoff–Saxo	+ 27"
6	Lars Bak (DNK)	Lotto–Belisol	+ 40"
7	Tiesj Benoot (BEL)	Lotto–Belisol	+ 44"
8	Jasper De Buyst (BEL)	Topsport Vlaanderen–Baloise	+ 46"
9	Victor Campenaerts (BEL)	Topsport Vlaanderen–Baloise	+ 52"
10	Rasmus Guldhammer (DNK)	Team TreFor–Blue Water	+ 54"

=== Stage 6 ===
10 August 2014 — Kalundborg to Frederiksberg, 175 km (109 mi)

Stage 6 result
Rank	Rider	Team	Time
1	Nicola Boem (ITA)	Bardiani–CSF	3h 49' 34"
2	Valerio Agnoli (ITA)	Astana	+ 0"
3	Martin Mortensen (DNK)	Cult Energy–Vital Water	+ 0"
4	Troels Vinther (DNK)	Cult Energy–Vital Water	+ 0"
5	Lars Bak (DNK)	Lotto–Belisol	+ 0"
6	Alessandro Bazzana (ITA)	UnitedHealthcare	+ 0"
7	Ignatas Konovalovas (LTU)	MTN–Qhubeka	+ 0"
8	Cesare Benedetti (ITA)	NetApp–Endura	+ 0"
9	Rasmus Quaade (DNK)	Team TreFor–Blue Water	+ 0"
10	Mark Sehested Pedersen (DNK)	Team TreFor–Blue Water	+ 0"

Final general classification
Rank	Rider	Team	Time
1	Michael Valgren (DNK)	Tinkoff–Saxo	18h 52' 22"
2	Lars Bak (DNK)	Lotto–Belisol	+ 15"
3	Manuele Boaro (ITA)	Tinkoff–Saxo	+ 17"
4	Alexey Lutsenko (KAZ)	Astana	+ 21"
5	Christopher Juul-Jensen (DNK)	Tinkoff–Saxo	+ 30"
6	Sean De Bie (BEL)	Lotto–Belisol	+ 31"
7	Jelle Wallays (BEL)	Topsport Vlaanderen–Baloise	+ 35"
8	Valerio Agnoli (ITA)	Astana	+ 40"
9	Troels Vinther (DNK)	Cult Energy–Vital Water	+ 56"
10	Tiesj Benoot (BEL)	Lotto–Belisol	+ 1' 01"
