= Troels Vinther =

Danish road bicycle racer

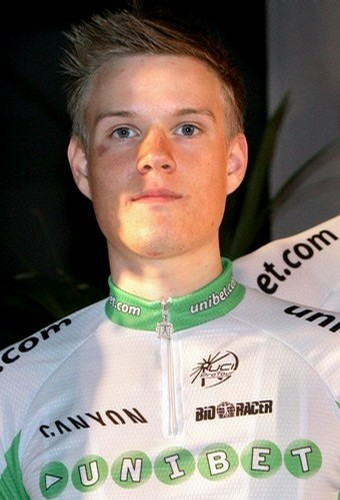
- Vinther in 2009.

Personal information
- Full name: Troels Rønning Vinther
- Born: 24 February 1987 (age 39) Silkeborg, Denmark
- Height: 1.82 m (6 ft 0 in)
- Weight: 68 kg (150 lb)

Cycling career
- Sport: Cycling
- Discipline: Road
- Role: Rider
- Rider type: All-rounder

Professional teams
- 2006: Glud & Marstrand–Horsens
- 2007–2008: Cycle Collstrop
- 2009: Team Capinordic
- 2010–2011: Glud & Marstrand–LRØ Radgivning
- 2012: Team Saxo Bank
- 2013–2015: Team Cult Energy
- 2016–2019: Riwal Platform

Troels Rønning Vinther (born 24 February 1987) is a Danish former professional road bicycle racer, who rode professionally between 2006 and 2019 for the Cycle Collstrop, Team Capinordic, Saxo Bank–Tinkoff Bank, Cult Energy Pro Cycling (over three spells) and Riwal Readynez teams.

== Major results ==
2005
1st Road race, National Junior Road Championships
1st Overall Liège–La Gleize

1st Mountains classification

7th Paris–Roubaix Juniors
2006
3rd Road race, National Road Championships
2008
7th Nationale Sluitingsprijs
2009
1st Stage 4 Tour de l'Avenir
1st Mountains classification Danmark Rundt
2nd Road race, National Under-23 Road Championships
3rd Grand Prix Cristal Energie
2010
4th Overall Festningsrittet

1st Stages 1 & 3

5th Overall Kreiz Breizh Elites
7th Overall Tour of China
2011
1st GP Herning
1st Stage 1 Circuit des Ardennes
4th Grote Prijs Stad Zottegem
6th Overall Flèche du Sud
10th Grand Prix de la Ville de Lillers
2013
4th Destination Thy
5th GP Herning
10th Overall Danmark Rundt
2014
1st Stage 2 Circuit des Ardennes
2nd Ster van Zwolle
2nd Destination Thy
3rd Overall Tour du Loir-et-Cher

1st Stage 2

9th Overall Danmark Rundt
2017
2nd Overall Tour du Loir-et-Cher
2nd Skive–Løbet
3rd Ringerike GP
4th Overall An Post Rás
2018
4th Ringerike GP
