= Lasse Bøchman =

Danish cyclist (born 1983)

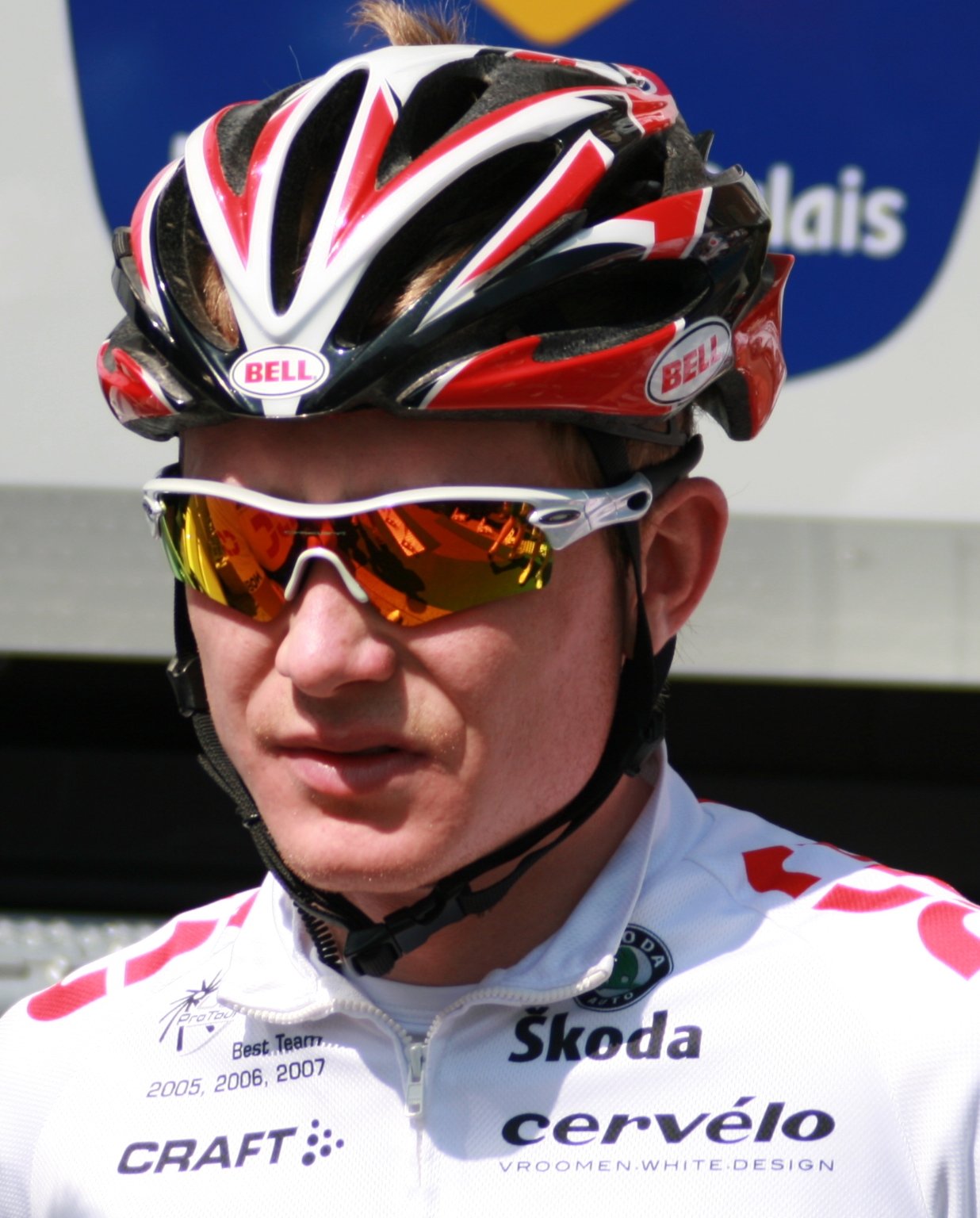

Personal information
- Full name: Lasse Bøchman
- Born: 13 June 1983 (age 43) Næstved, Denmark

Cycling career
- Sport: Cycling
- Current team: Retired
- Discipline: Road
- Role: Rider

Amateur teams
- 2003: CK Kronborg Pro
- 2005: Glud & Marstrand–Horsens
- 2006: Team GLS
- 2007–2008: Glud & Marstrand–Horsens
- 2007: Team CSC (stagiaire)
- 2013: Næstved CK

Professional teams
- 2008–2009: Team CSC
- 2010–2012: Glud & Marstrand–LRØ Radgivning
- 2013: J.Jensen-Ramirent
- 2014: Cult Energy–Vital Water

Lasse Bøchman (born 13 June 1983) is a Danish former professional road bicycle racer. He joined Team CSC, as they were then known, in early 2008 after performing beyond expectations during a training camp in Majorca.

For the 2014 season, Bøchman rejoined Cult Energy–Vital Water, his fourth such spell with the team; he previously competed with the squad in 2005, 2007 and between 2010 and 2012.

== Major results ==
2007
6th Overall Flèche du Sud
9th Overall Danmark Rundt
2009
4th Overall Bayern-Rundfahrt
2010
1st Overall Flèche du Sud
4th Overall Circuit des Ardennes
4th Overall Ringerike GP
8th GP Herning
2011
1st Overall Flèche du Sud

1st Stage 4

3rd Overall Rhône-Alpes Isère Tour
4th Himmerland Rundt
9th Rutland–Melton International CiCLE Classic
2012
5th Overall Flèche du Sud
10th Overall Rhône-Alpes Isère Tour
10th Overall Kreiz Breizh Elites
2014
2nd Hadeland GP
4th National Time Trial Championships
7th Overall Rhône-Alpes Isère Tour
