= Rasmus Guldhammer =

Danish road cyclist (born 1989)

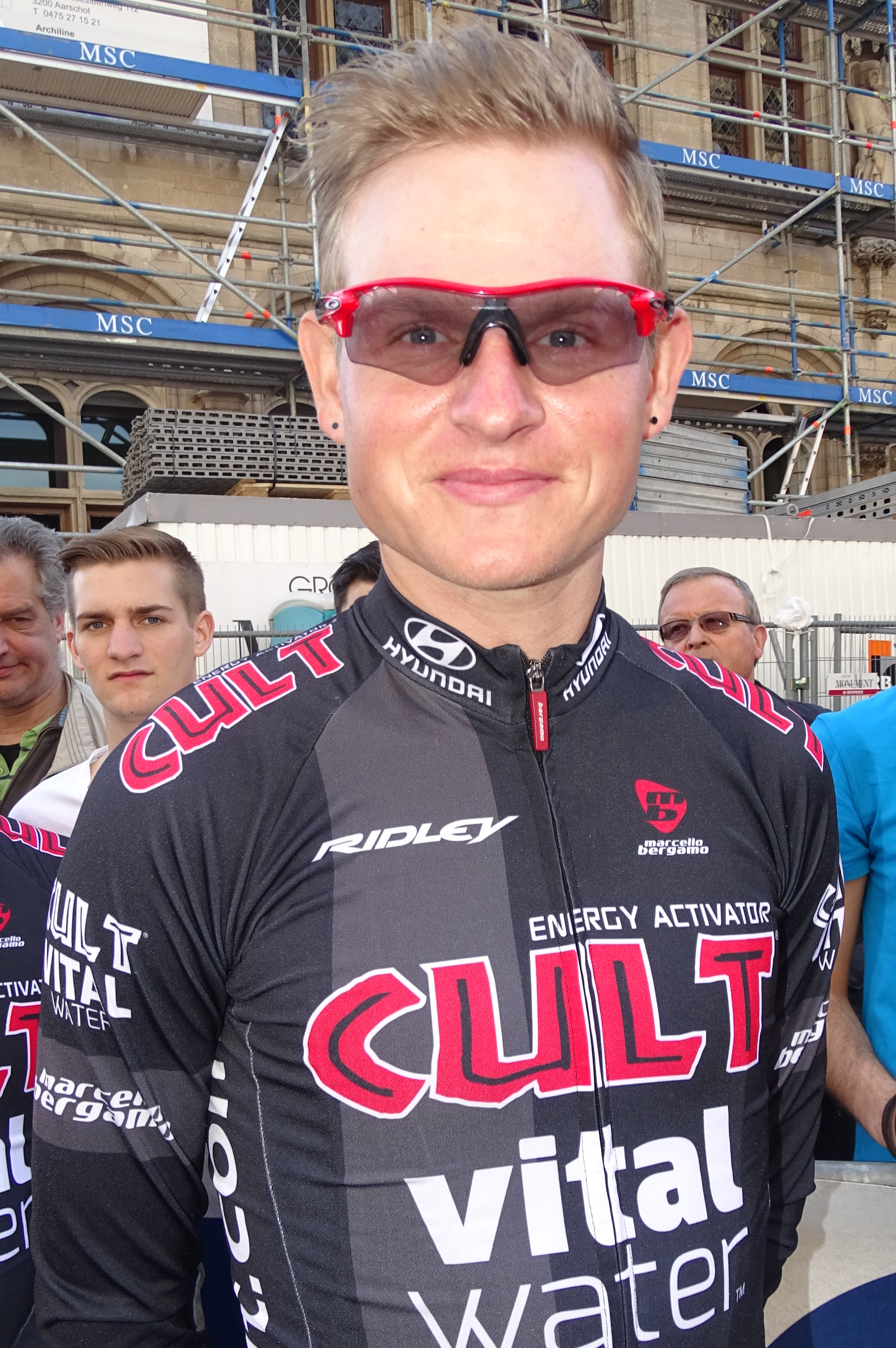
- Guldhammer in 2015

Personal information
- Full name: Rasmus Poulsen Guldhammer
- Born: 9 March 1989 (age 37) Vejle
- Height: 1.83 m (6 ft 0 in)
- Weight: 66 kg (146 lb)

Cycling career
- Sport: Cycling
- Current team: Retired
- Discipline: Road
- Role: Rider
- Rider type: One day races

Amateur team
- 2006–2007: Festina Vejle

Professional teams
- 2008: Team Designa Køkken
- 2009: Team Capinordic
- 2010: Team HTC–Columbia
- 2011: Concordia Forsikring–Himmerland
- 2012: Christina Watches–Onfone
- 2013–2014: Team TreFor
- 2014: Tinkoff–Saxo (stagiaire)
- 2015: Cult Energy Pro Cycling
- 2016: Stölting Service Group
- 2017–2019: Team VéloCONCEPT

Rasmus Poulsen Guldhammer (born 9 March 1989 in Vejle) is a Danish former professional cyclist.

== Major results ==
2006
3rd Time trial, National Junior Road Championships
2007
1st Road race, National Junior Road Championships
7th Overall Trofeo Karlsberg
2008
5th Overall Giro delle Regioni
8th Fyen Rundt
2009
1st Road race, National Under-23 Road Championships
1st Liège–Bastogne–Liège Espoirs
2nd Ronde van Vlaanderen U23
3rd Overall Grand Prix du Portugal

1st Stages 1 & 2

4th Overall Danmark Rundt

1st Young rider classification

4th La Côte Picarde
2010
2nd Fyen Rundt
6th Overall Danmark Rundt

1st Young rider classification

7th GP Herning
2011
1st Stage 2b Le Triptyque des Monts et Châteaux
2nd Himmerland Rundt
2013
3rd Overall Rás Tailteann
4th GP Herning
5th Ringerike GP
6th Himmerland Rundt
2014
1st Hadeland GP
2nd Himmerland Rundt
3rd Skive–Løbet
4th Overall Tour du Loir-et-Cher

1st Stages 4 & 5

7th Giro di Toscana
9th Destination Thy
2015
2nd GP Horsens
4th Overall Tour des Fjords
4th Overall Danmark Rundt
4th Overall Tour of Britain
4th Gran Premio di Lugano
5th Classica Corsica
5th Volta Limburg Classic
7th Overall Arctic Race of Norway
8th Trofeo Laigueglia
9th GP Ouest–France
10th Vattenfall Cyclassics
2016
2nd Velothon Wales
4th GP Horsens
8th Grand Prix de Wallonie
2017
1st Sundvolden GP
1st Ringerike GP
2nd GP Horsens
3rd Overall Tour du Loir-et-Cher
3rd Overall Kreiz Breizh Elites

1st Stage 4

3rd GP Viborg
4th Overall Danmark Rundt
5th Overall Istrian Spring Trophy
6th Overall Circuit des Ardennes

1st Stage 2

6th Overall Czech Cycling Tour
10th Overall Tour de Luxembourg
2019
5th Volta Limburg Classic
5th Gylne Gutuer
