= Martin Mortensen (cyclist) =

Danish racing cyclist

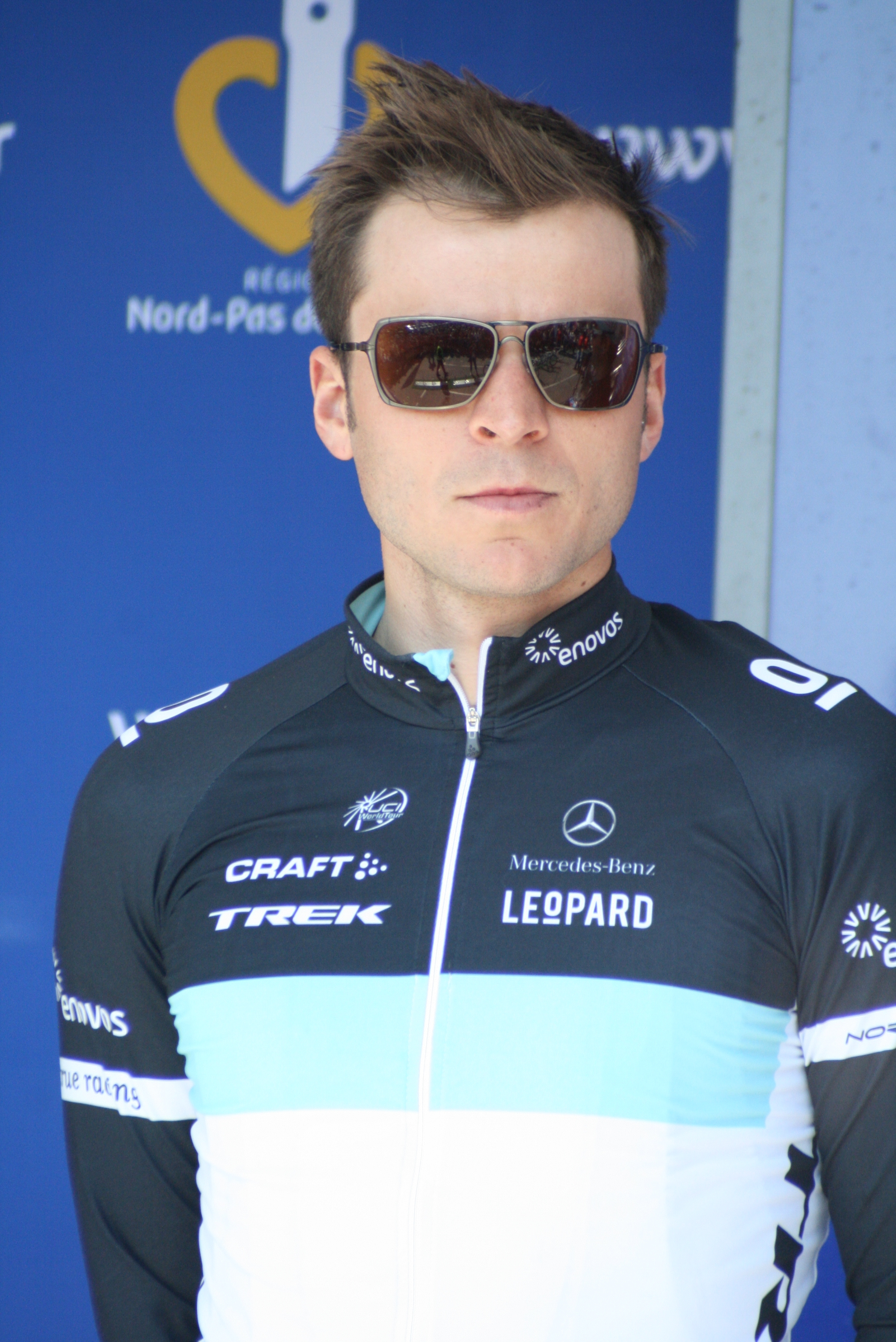
- Mortensen at the 2011 Four Days of Dunkirk

Personal information
- Full name: Martin Mortensen
- Born: 5 November 1984 (age 41) Herning, Denmark
- Height: 181 cm (5 ft 11 in)
- Weight: 69 kg (152 lb)

Cycling career
- Sport: Cycling
- Current team: Retired
- Discipline: Road
- Role: Rider
- Rider type: Rouleur

Professional teams
- 2007–2008: Team Designa Køkken
- 2009–2010: Vacansoleil
- 2011: Leopard Trek
- 2012: Vacansoleil–DCM
- 2013: Concordia Forsikring–Riwal
- 2014–2015: Cult Energy–Vital Water
- 2016: ONE Pro Cycling
- 2017: Team ColoQuick–Cult
- 2018: Riwal CeramicSpeed
- 2019: Team Waoo

Martin Mortensen (born 5 November 1984) is a Danish former professional racing cyclist, who rode professionally from 2007 to 2019.

== Major results ==
2000
3rd Time trial, National Junior Road Championships
2002
1st Time trial, National Junior Road Championships
2004
3rd Road race, National Under-23 Road Championships
2005
National Under-23 Road Championships

1st Time trial
2nd Road race

4th Time trial, UCI Under-23 Road World Championships
4th GP des Eaux Minérales de Beckerich
2006
2nd Time trial, National Under-23 Road Championships
5th Paris–Roubaix Espoirs
10th La Côte Picarde
2007
1st GP de Dourges-Hénin-Beaumont
2nd Grand Prix de la ville de Nogent-sur-Oise
4th Duo Normand (with Thomas Guldhammer)
6th Overall Ronde de l'Oise
10th Chrono Champenois
2008
1st Duo Normand (with Michael Tronborg)
3rd Overall Boucle de l'Artois

1st Stage 1

4th Time trial, National Road Championships
5th Chrono Champenois
2010
2nd GP Herning
National Road Championships

4th Road race
4th Time trial

4th Overall Danmark Rundt
2011
2nd Road race, National Road Championships
2013
Tour de Normandie

1st Mountains classification
1st Stage 2

1st Mountains classification Danmark Rundt
1st Stage 4 Okolo Slovenska
2nd GP Herning
2nd Destination Thy
2nd Ronde van Overijssel
8th Overall Tour of Estonia
2014
1st Overall Czech Cycling Tour

1st Stage 2

5th Road race, National Road Championships
2015
1st Velothon Wales
2nd Road race, National Road Championships
2016
1st Tro-Bro Léon
2017
5th Skive–Løbet
8th GP Horsens
2018
3rd Gooikse Pijl
7th Scandinavian Race Uppsala
