= Thomas Kvist =

Danish cyclist

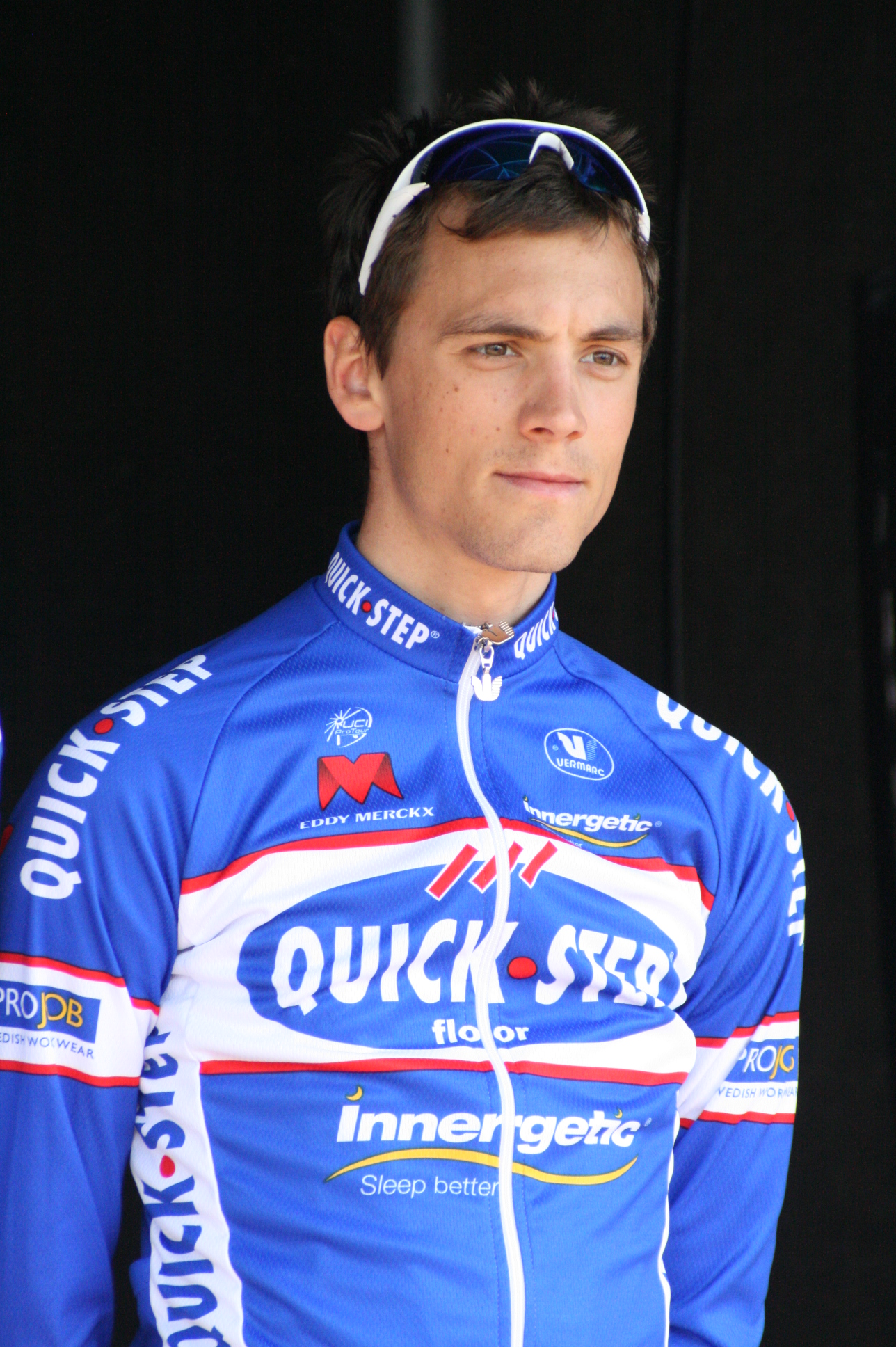

Personal information
- Full name: Thomas Vedel Kvist
- Born: 18 August 1987 (age 39) Odder, Denmark
- Height: 1.83 m (6 ft 0 in)
- Weight: 68 kg (150 lb)

Cycling career
- Sport: Cycling
- Discipline: Road
- Role: Rider

Amateur teams
- 2006: Team Designa Køkken
- 2007–2008: Beveren 2000

Professional teams
- 2009–2010: Quick-Step
- 2011: Glud & Marstrand–LRØ

Thomas Vedel Kvist (born 18 August 1987) is a Danish former road bicycle racer, who competed as a professional between 2009 and 2011.

He signed as a professional on 1 August 2008 after an amateur career that included winning a stage and the final standings of the Coupe des nations Ville Saguenay in Canada for the Beveren 2000 team.

== Major results ==
2004
7th Overall Oberösterreich Juniorenrundfahrt
7th Overall Int. 3-Etappen-Rundfahrt
2005
1st Overall Giro della Lunigiana

1st Stage 3

1st Overall GP Général Patton
1st Stage 1 Trofeo Karlsberg
2nd Overall UCI Junior Road World Cup
4th Overall Liège–La Gleize
5th Overall Tour du Pays de Vaud

1st Stage 2

6th Overall Course de la Paix Juniors
2006
8th La Côte Picarde
2007
5th Circuit de Wallonie
6th Overall GP Tell
2008
1st Overall Coupe des nations Ville Saguenay

1st Stage 5

3rd Overall Tour de Liège

1st Stage 2

5th Kattekoers
2011
1st Stage 4 Rhône-Alpes Isère Tour
3rd Overall Kreiz Breizh Elites
10th Overall Tour de Normandie

1st Stage 2

10th Himmerland Rundt
