= Kim Nielsen =

Kim Nielsen may refer to

- Kim Nielsen (cyclist) (born 1986), Danish cyclist
- Kim Nielsen (guitarist) (born 1964), American hard rock bass guitar player
- Kim Nielsen (wrestler) (born 1973), American professional wrestler and valet
- Kim Herforth Nielsen (born 1954), Danish architect
- Kim Milton Nielsen (born 1960), Danish football referee
- Kim Østergaard Nielsen (born 1974), Danish footballer
- Kim E. Nielsen American historian and author
