= Michael Carbel =

Danish cyclist

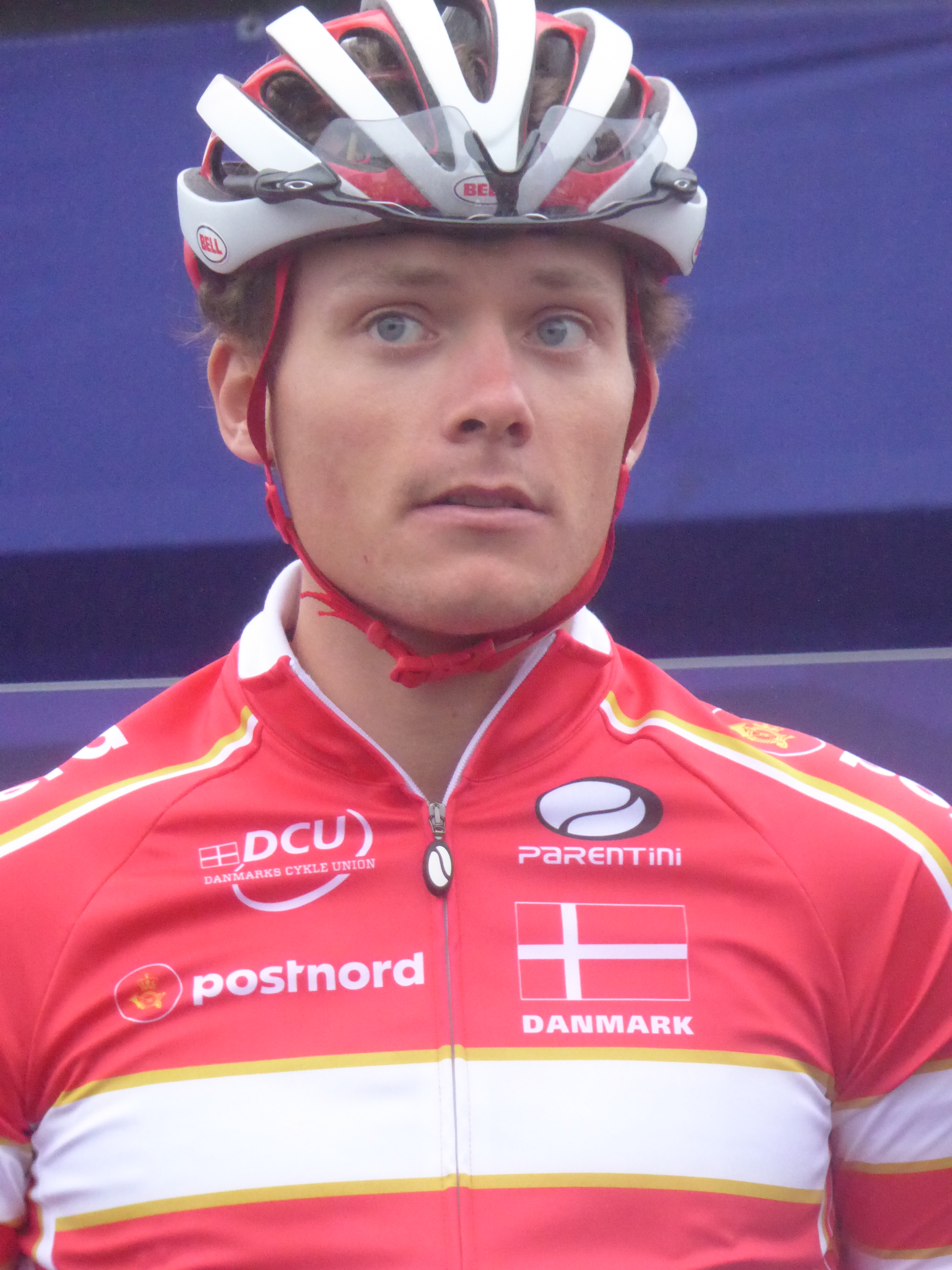
- Carbel at the 2018 European Road Cycling Championships

Personal information
- Full name: Michael Carbel Svendgaard
- Born: February 7, 1995 (age 31) Horsens, Denmark
- Height: 179 cm (5 ft 10 in)
- Weight: 73 kg (161 lb)

Cycling career
- Sport: Cycling
- Discipline: Road
- Role: Rider

Amateur team
- 2012–2013: Team Bluewater Junior

Professional teams
- 2014–2015: Cult Energy–Vital Water
- 2016: Stölting Service Group
- 2017: Team VéloCONCEPT
- 2018: Fortuneo–Samsic
- 2019: Team Waoo
- 2020: NTT Pro Cycling
Medal record
Representing Denmark
Men's road bicycle racing
World Championships
Bronze medal – third place	2017 Bergen	Under-23 road race

Michael Carbel Svendgaard (born 7 February 1995) is a Danish former professional cyclist, who rode professionally between 2014 and 2020, for the Cult Energy Pro Cycling, Stölting Service Group, Fortuneo–Samsic, Team Waoo (two spells) and NTT Pro Cycling teams.

== Major results ==
2013
1st Road race, National Junior Road Championships
1st Stage 2 Giro della Lunigiana
2014
1st Dorpenomloop Rucphen
2nd Road race, National Road Championships
8th Eschborn-Frankfurt City Loop U23
2015
3rd Overall ZLM Tour

1st Stage 2 (TTT)

3rd Dwars door Drenthe
2016
7th Fyen Rundt
8th Gent–Wevelgem U23
9th Grand Prix Impanis-Van Petegem
2017
1st Road race, National Under-23 Road Championships
1st GP Herning
3rd Road race, UCI Under-23 Road World Championships
4th Trofej Umag
10th Eschborn-Frankfurt City Loop U23
2018
3rd Road race, National Road Championships
2019
1st Stage 5 Flèche du Sud
5th Himmerland Rundt
