= 2015 Gran Premio di Lugano =

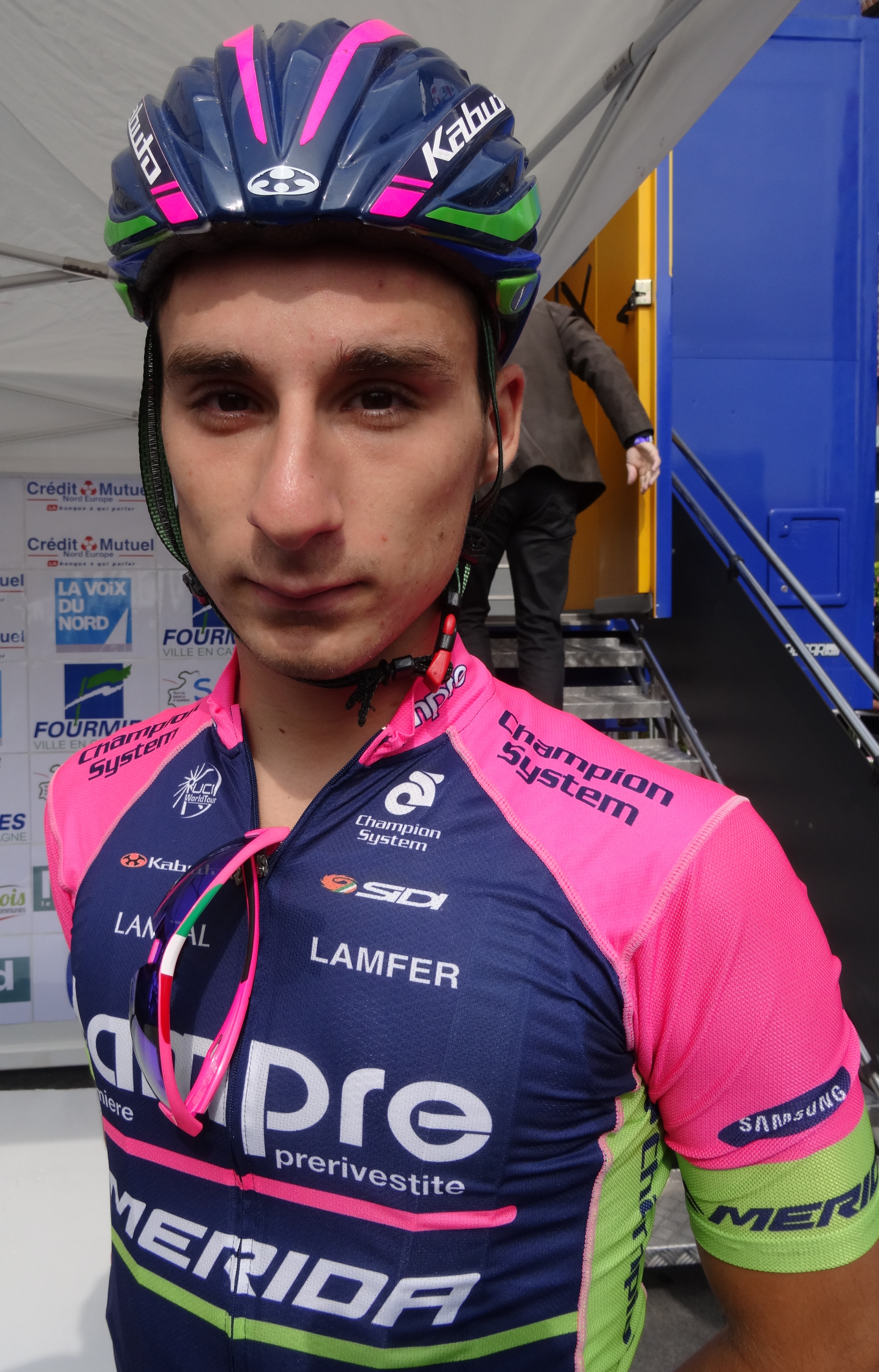
- Niccolò Bonifazio, winner of the 2015 Gran Premio di Lugano

Race details
- Dates: 1 March 2015
- Stages: 1
- Distance: 184.9 km (114.9 mi)
- Winning time: 4h 38' 08"

Results
	Winner	Niccolò Bonifazio (ITA)	(Lampre–Merida)
	Second	Francesco Gavazzi (ITA)	(Southeast Pro Cycling)
	Third	Matteo Montaguti (ITA)	(AG2R La Mondiale)

The 2015 SuisseGas Gran Premio di Lugano was the 69th edition of the Gran Premio di Lugano road cycling race. The race took place on 1 March 2015 on a loop around the city of Lugano, Switzerland, starting and finishing on the shore of Lake Lugano. The defending champion from the 2014 Gran Premio di Lugano was Mauro Finetto (Southeast Pro Cycling).

While the terrain of the race was not particularly difficult, it was considered likely that the race would be fairly selective because the race came so early in the season, when riders were not in their best form. The most challenging climb was expected to be that of Collina d'Oro.

The race was won by Niccolò Bonifazio (Lampre–Merida) in a sprint.

== Teams ==
14 teams were selected to take part; four were UCI WorldTeams, nine were Professional Continental teams and one was a Continental team. With eight riders per team allowed to enter the race, the maximum number of riders was 112.

=== WorldTeams ===
- Tinkoff–Saxo
- Lampre–Merida
- IAM Cycling
- AG2R La Mondiale

=== Professional Continental teams ===
- Southeast Pro Cycling
- Bardiani–CSF
- Androni Giocattoli
- Nippo–Vini Fantini
- RusVelo
- MTN–Qhubeka
- Team Novo Nordisk
- Colombia
- Cult Energy Pro Cycling

=== Continental teams ===
- Roth–Škoda

== Race report ==
The early part of the race saw a 17-man breakaway form. They built up a maximum lead of just over four minutes, before the breakaway split up after approximately 105 kilometres (65 miles). Jérôme Coppel (IAM Cycling) and Nico Brüngger (Roth–Škoda) escaped from the rest of the group and built a small lead; a seven-man group formed behind them with the remainder of the breakaway swallowed up by the peloton, now led by RusVelo. The chase group caught Coppel and Brüngger, and Daniel Teklehaimanot (MTN–Qhubeka) made a solo attack, but after 155 kilometres (96 miles) the race was brought back together. Tinkoff–Saxo led the pace through the final lap of the race, with Ivan Basso attacking on the climb. The climb, however, was shortened by roadworks and Basso was not able to build a sufficient lead. The race therefore came down to a sprint, and Niccolò Bonifazio (Lampre–Merida) took his first win of the year. Francesco Gavazzi (Southeast Pro Cycling) was second with Matteo Montaguti (AG2R La Mondiale) the third Italian rider on the podium.

== Race result ==
Result
Rank	Rider	Team	Time
1	Niccolò Bonifazio (ITA)	Lampre–Merida	4h 38' 08"
2	Francesco Gavazzi (ITA)	Southeast Pro Cycling	+ 0"
3	Matteo Montaguti (ITA)	AG2R La Mondiale	+ 0"
4	Rasmus Guldhammer (DEN)	Cult Energy Pro Cycling	+ 0"
5	Linus Gerdemann (GER)	Cult Energy Pro Cycling	+ 0"
6	Franco Pellizotti (ITA)	Androni Giocattoli	+ 0"
7	Javier Mejías (ESP)	Team Novo Nordisk	+ 0"
8	Manuele Boaro (ITA)	Tinkoff–Saxo	+ 0"
9	David Tanner (AUS)	IAM Cycling	+ 0"
10	Damiano Cunego (ITA)	Nippo–Vini Fantini	+ 0"
