= 2018 Amstel Gold Race =

Cycling race

2018 UCI World Tour, race 16 of 37
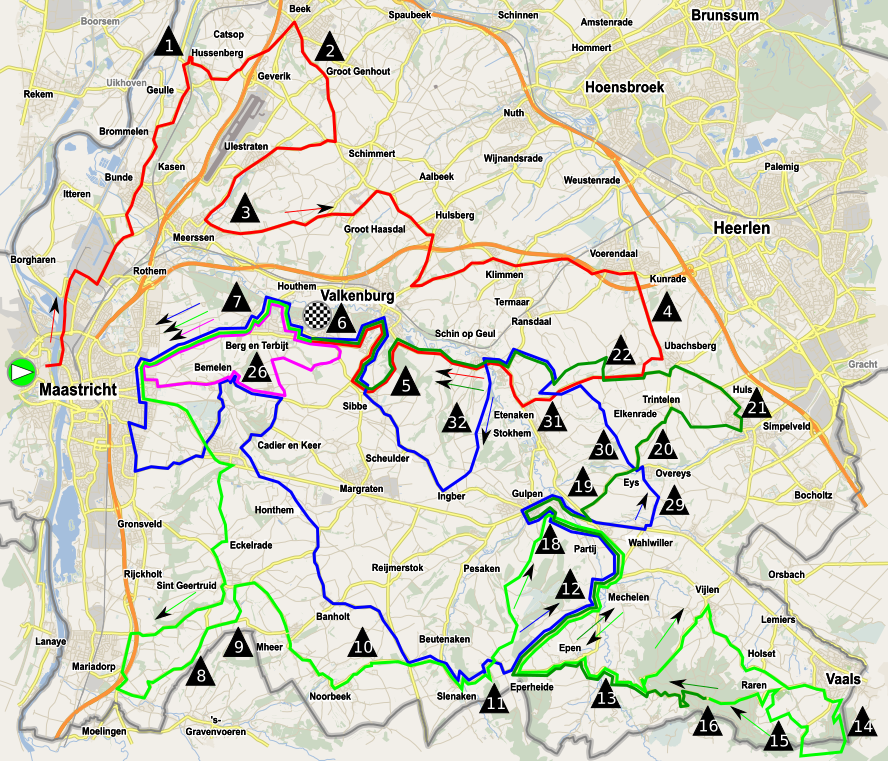

Race details
- Dates: 15 April 2018
- Stages: 1
- Distance: 263 km (163.4 mi)
- Winning time: 6h 40' 07"

Results
	Winner	Michael Valgren (DEN)	(Astana)
	Second	Roman Kreuziger (CZE)	(Mitchelton–Scott)
	Third	Enrico Gasparotto (ITA)	(Bahrain–Merida)

The 2018 Amstel Gold Race was a road cycling one-day race that took place on 15 April 2018 in the Netherlands. It was the 53rd edition of the Amstel Gold Race and the sixteenth event of the 2018 UCI World Tour. The race started in Maastricht and finished in Berg en Terblijt, containing 35 categorised climbs, covering a total distance of 263 kilometres (163 miles).

The race was won by Michael Valgren (Astana) in a two-up sprint with Mitchelton–Scott's Roman Kreuziger. Bahrain–Merida's Enrico Gasparotto finished third, two seconds behind the front pair.

== Route ==
The race started on Maastricht's Markt, the city's central market square, and finished in Berg en Terblijt, totaling 263 kilometres (163 miles). The route, similar to the 2017 edition, was made up of four sinuous loops centering around Valkenburg in the south of Limburg. Only the final loop, 16 kilometres (9.9 miles) long, was modified in order to search for more narrow roads. Organisers intended to make the race finale harder for a peloton to control. Maastricht and Valkenburg have been the start and finish locations of the Amstel Gold Race since 1998 and 2003, respectively, and engaged themselves to host the race until 2022.

The route contained 35 categorised hills, usually short but with a varying gradient and coming in quick succession throughout the race. Since 2017, the uphill finish on the Cauberg was abandoned, after it had been the last climb of the race for 14 years. Nonetheless, the Cauberg, the difficult and most iconic passage, was addressed three times during the race. The third crossing of the Cauberg came at 18 kilometres (11 miles) to go and was followed only by the Geulhemmerberg at 13 kilometres (8.1 miles) and Bemelerberg at 7 kilometres (4.3 miles) from the finish.

== Teams ==
As the Amstel Gold Race was a UCI World Tour event, all eighteen UCI WorldTeams were invited automatically and obliged to enter a team in the race. Seven UCI Professional Continental teams competed, completing the 25-team peloton.

UCI WorldTeams

- AG2R La Mondiale
- Astana
- Bahrain–Merida
- BMC Racing Team
- Bora–Hansgrohe
- Team Dimension Data
- EF Education First–Drapac p/b Cannondale
- Team Katusha–Alpecin
- LottoNL–Jumbo
- Lotto–Soudal
- Mitchelton–Scott
- Movistar Team
- Quick-Step Floors
- Team Sky
- Team Sunweb
- Trek–Segafredo
- UAE Team Emirates
- Groupama–FDJ

UCI Professional Continental teams

- Aqua Blue Sport
- Israel Cycling Academy
- Nippo–Vini Fantini–Europa Ovini
- Roompot–Nederlandse Loterij
- Sport Vlaanderen–Baloise
- Vital Concept
- Wanty–Groupe Gobert

== Result ==
Result
Rank	Rider	Team	Time
1	Michael Valgren (DEN)	Astana	6h 40' 07"
2	Roman Kreuziger (CZE)	Mitchelton–Scott	+ 0"
3	Enrico Gasparotto (ITA)	Bahrain–Merida	+ 2"
4	Peter Sagan (SVK)	Bora–Hansgrohe	+ 19"
5	Alejandro Valverde (ESP)	Movistar Team	+ 19"
6	Tim Wellens (BEL)	Lotto–Soudal	+ 19"
7	Julian Alaphilippe (FRA)	Quick-Step Floors	+ 19"
8	Jakob Fuglsang (DEN)	Astana	+ 23"
9	Lawson Craddock (USA)	EF Education First–Drapac p/b Cannondale	+ 30"
10	Jelle Vanendert (BEL)	Lotto–Soudal	+ 36"
