= 2018 Omloop Het Nieuwsblad =

Cycling race

2018 UCI World Tour, race 4 of 37
- Event poster with previous winner Greg Van Avermaet

Race details
- Dates: 24 February 2018
- Stages: 1
- Distance: 196.2 km (121.9 mi)
- Winning time: 4h 50' 14"

Results
| | Winner | Michael Valgren (DEN) | (Astana) |
| | Second | Łukasz Wiśniowski (POL) | (Team Sky) |
| | Third | Sep Vanmarcke (BEL) | (EF Education First–Drapac p/b Cannondale) |

The 2018 Omloop Het Nieuwsblad was a road cycling one-day race that took place on 24 February 2018 in Belgium. It was the 73rd edition of the Omloop Het Nieuwsblad and the fourth event of the 2018 UCI World Tour. It was won by Danish rider Michael Valgren for the Astana team, soloing to victory by 12 seconds ahead of Team Sky's Łukasz Wiśniowski of Poland, with the podium completed by the highest-placed home rider Sep Vanmarcke (EF Education First–Drapac p/b Cannondale).

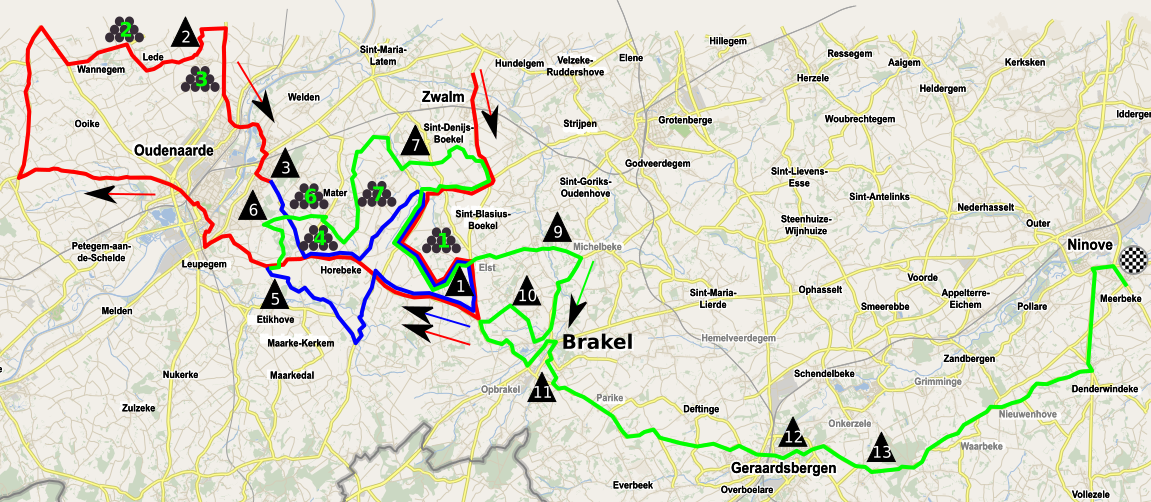
Final 140 km of the race

== Teams ==
As the race was only added to the UCI World Tour calendar in 2017, all UCI WorldTeams were invited to the race, but not obligated to compete in the race. As such, seventeen of the eighteen WorldTeams – with the exception of the Movistar Team – competed in the race, up two on 2017. Eight UCI Professional Continental teams competed, completing the 25-team peloton.

UCI WorldTeams

- AG2R La Mondiale
- Astana
- Bahrain–Merida
- BMC Racing Team
- Bora–Hansgrohe
- EF Education First–Drapac p/b Cannondale
- Team Dimension Data
- Team Katusha–Alpecin
- LottoNL–Jumbo
- Lotto–Soudal
- Mitchelton–Scott
- Quick-Step Floors
- Team Sky
- Team Sunweb
- Trek–Segafredo
- UAE Team Emirates
- FDJ

UCI Professional Continental teams

- Cofidis
- Fortuneo–Samsic
- Roompot–Nederlandse Loterij
- Sport Vlaanderen–Baloise
- Vérandas Willems–Crelan
- Vital Concept
- Wanty–Groupe Gobert
- WB Aqua Protect Veranclassic

== Result ==
Result
| Rank | Rider | Team | Time |
|---|---|---|---|
| 1 | Michael Valgren (DEN) | Astana | 4h 50' 14" |
| 2 | Łukasz Wiśniowski (POL) | Team Sky | + 12" |
| 3 | Sep Vanmarcke (BEL) | EF Education First–Drapac p/b Cannondale | + 12" |
| 4 | Jasper Stuyven (BEL) | Trek–Segafredo | + 12" |
| 5 | Philippe Gilbert (BEL) | Quick-Step Floors | + 12" |
| 6 | Edward Theuns (BEL) | Team Sunweb | + 12" |
| 7 | Bert Van Lerberghe (BEL) | Cofidis | + 12" |
| 8 | Sonny Colbrelli (ITA) | Bahrain–Merida | + 12" |
| 9 | Arnaud Démare (FRA) | FDJ | + 12" |
| 10 | Marcus Burghardt (GER) | Bora–Hansgrohe | + 12" |
