= Magnus Cort =

Danish cyclist (born 1993)

Magnus Cort Nielsen
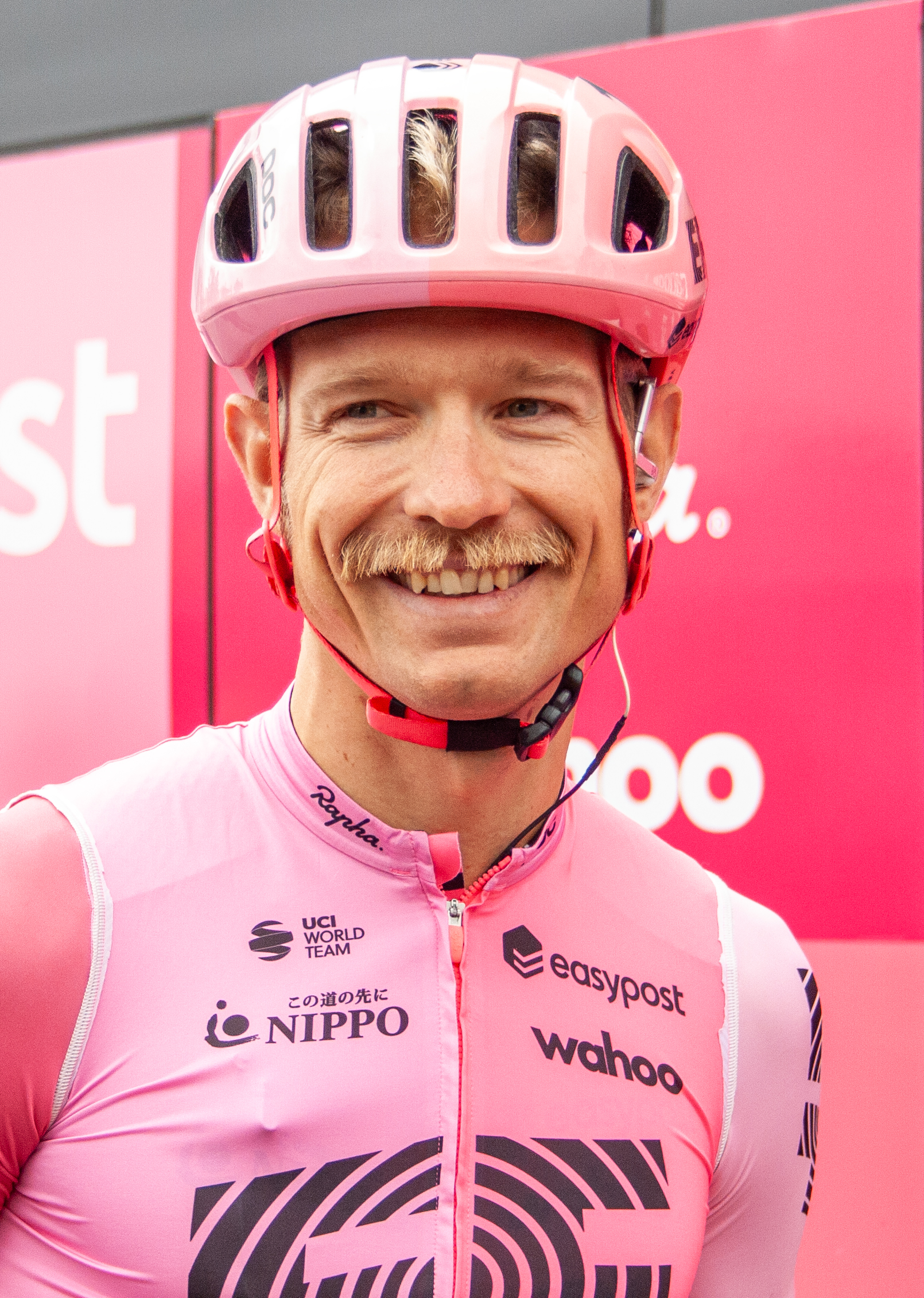
- Cort at the 2023 Danmark Rundt

Personal information
- Full name: Magnus Cort Nielsen
- Nicknames: Kong-Cort; ConCorten
- Born: 16 January 1993 (age 33) Rønne, Denmark
- Height: 1.83 m (6 ft 0 in)
- Weight: 68 kg (150 lb; 10 st 10 lb)

Cycling career
- Sport: Cycling
- Current team: Uno-X Mobility
- Discipline: Road
- Role: Rider
- Rider type: Breakaway specialist, puncheur, sprinter

Amateur teams
- 2004–2010: Bornholms Cycle Club
- 2011: Team ABC Junior

Professional teams
- 2012: Forsikring–Himmerland
- 2013–2014: Team Cult Energy
- 2014: Orica–GreenEDGE (stagiaire)
- 2015–2017: Orica–GreenEDGE
- 2018–2019: Astana
- 2020–2023: EF Pro Cycling
- 2024–: Uno-X Mobility

Major wins
- Grand Tours Tour de France 2 individual stages (2018, 2022) Giro d'Italia 1 individual stage (2023) Vuelta a España 6 individual stages (2016, 2020, 2021) Combativity award (2021) Stage races Arctic Race of Norway (2024) One-day races and Classics National Road Race Championships (2026) Veneto Classic (2024) Clásica de Almería (2017)

Magnus Cort Nielsen (born 16 January 1993) is a Danish former professional road racing cyclist who rides for UCI WorldTeam Uno-X Mobility.

== Career ==
=== Orica–GreenEDGE (2015–17) ===
In June 2014, World Tour team Orica–GreenEDGE signed Cort for three years, starting from the 2015 season. He was named in the startlist for the 2016 Vuelta a España, where he won stages 18 and 21.

=== Astana (2018–19) ===
Cort rode for Astana in 2018. He was named in the start list for the 2018 Tour de France. On 22 July 2018, Cort won stage 15 of the race after being in a breakaway for most of the day. Cort attacked with 8 kilometres (5.0 miles) to go, and ended up in a breakaway together with Bauke Mollema and Ion Izagirre, where he was the fastest man in the final sprint and won the first Tour de France stage of his career.

=== EF Education First (2020–23) ===
In August 2019, it was announced that Cort would be joining the EF Pro Cycling team on a two-year contract, from the 2020 season.

During the 2021 Vuelta a España he won three individual stages and was named the most combative rider of the race. He won the intermediate stage 6, where he just edged overall race leader Primož Roglič for the win. On stage 11 he dropped the surviving breakaway riders and was within less than 300 meters from his second stage win, but he was caught by Roglič, Enric Mas and other riders fighting for the general classification. The very next day Cort survived the two climbs and won his second stage of the Vuelta, crediting his team with setting him up perfectly for the sprint finish. On stage 19 Cort once again found himself at the front of the race near the end of the stage. With less than a kilometer to go his teammate Lawson Craddock rode at the front of the group to control the pace and put Cort in position to time his attack perfectly, which he then did defeating Rui Oliveira and Quinn Simmons in the sprint. Craddock came across the line five seconds later with his arms in the air celebrating the victory of his teammate.

At the start of the 2022 Tour de France he took every available mountain point, over the small hills of Denmark, to earn the polka dot jersey early in the race. After the rest day when the race moved to France, he broke the record of the great Federico Bahamontes, for finishing first at the most consecutive mountain checkpoints. On stage 5 the following day he once again joined the breakaway, with teammate Neilson Powless, who had a chance to take the yellow jersey. He fell slightly behind towards the end of the stage but won his second Most Combative Rider award in three stages. He lost the polka dot jersey after stage 9, but on stage 10 he joined the breakaway yet again; and survived to the finish where he won the eighth grand tour stage and second Tour de France stage of his career, in a photo finish. As the third week began he was forced to abandon the race due to a positive COVID test. As a result, this became the first grand tour he ever entered that he did not finish.

=== Uno-X Mobility (2024–present) ===
Cort signed with the Uno-X Pro Cycling Team for the 2024, 2025 and 2026 seasons. On 3 June 2024, he won the second stage of the Critérium du Dauphiné on the Col de la Loge and took the yellow jersey, which he held for a day. He won the Arctic Race of Norway in August, taking the stage into Bodø and finishing on the podium on two further stages. In October, he won the Veneto Classic alone.

The team raced as Uno-X Mobility from 2025. Cort won the opening stage of O Gran Camiño at Matosinhos on 26 February. He hit an obstacle and ran into another rider inside the final kilometre, then sprinted from 250 m (820 ft) out to beat Santiago Mesa and Giovanni Lonardi, and took the leader's jersey with four seconds in hand. He won the second stage at A Estrada the next day, beating Martin Marcellusi and Carlos Canal by several lengths on a rising finish, and extended his lead through the ten-second winner's bonus. He lost the jersey to Derek Gee on the third stage, a time trial at Ourense, finishing 25 seconds down. He won the final stage into Santiago de Compostela from Canal and Lonardi for his third stage win of the race. He finished third overall, 38 seconds behind Gee, and won the points classification. He finished second at Eschborn–Frankfurt, sixth at Milan–San Remo, sixth at Strade Bianche and tenth at the Tour du Doubs.

Uno-X Mobility rode as a UCI WorldTeam from 2026. On 24 March, Cort won the second stage of the Volta a Catalunya on his debut in the race. The stage ran 167.4 km (104.0 mi) from Figueres to Banyoles. A five-man breakaway led by about three minutes, and the last of its riders, Liam Slock, was caught at the flamme rouge. Cort won the sprint from Noa Isidore and Francesco Busatto. Dorian Godon finished fourth and kept the race lead, level on time with Cort, who was second overall. It was Cort's first win at World Tour level since the 2024 Critérium du Dauphiné and the team's first as a WorldTeam. He finished third on the third stage of the Tour de Suisse in June.

Uno-X Mobility announced on 27 June 2026 that Cort would retire at the end of the season. Cort said that he still felt he was riding at his best, but that he had been in the sport for many years and was beginning to feel ready to stop. He added that he intended to ride the Tour de France and possibly the Vuelta a España before he finished, and that he had no firm plans afterwards. Cort won the road race at the Danish National Championships at Herning the day after announcing his retirement at the end of the season. The race covered 218 km (135 mi) at an average speed of 49.4 km/h (30.7 mph), the fastest in the championship's history. A move containing Mads Pedersen went clear with 7 km (4.3 mi) to go and was caught inside the final kilometre. Uno-X Mobility led Cort out and he won the sprint from Anders Foldager, with his Uno-X team-mate Anthon Charmig third. Pedersen finished fifth. It was Cort's first national road title at his eleventh attempt.

== Major results ==
=== Cyclo-cross ===
2010–2011
1st National Junior Championships

=== Gravel ===
2023
6th UCI World Championships

=== Road ===
2011
1st Road race, National Junior Championships
1st Overall Course de la Paix Juniors

1st Stages 3b & 4

3rd Overall Kroz Istru
5th Overall Tour de la Région de Lodz
8th Overall Trofeo Karlsberg
9th Overall Rothaus Regio-Tour International
2012
2nd Road race, National Under-23 Championships
3rd Post Cup Odder
3rd Tønder GP
2013 (2 pro wins)
Thüringen Rundfahrt der U23

1st Mountains classification
1st Stage 6

1st Stage 1 Tour de la Province de Liège
3rd Ronde Van Vlaanderen Beloften
3rd Himmerland Rundt
9th Overall Danmark Rundt

1st Stages 1 & 4

10th Hadeland GP
2014 (2)
1st Overall Ronde de l'Oise

1st Points classification
1st Young rider classification
1st Stages 3 & 4

1st Overall Istrian Spring Trophy

1st Stages 1 & 2

1st Himmerland Rundt
1st Destination Thy
1st Ringerike GP
1st Stage 1 Danmark Rundt
2nd Overall Tour des Fjords

1st Young rider classification
1st Stage 3

5th Volta Limburg Classic
6th Eschborn–Frankfurt City Loop U23
2015
4th Road race, National Championships
10th Overall Danmark Rundt
10th GP Ouest–France
2016 (3)
Vuelta a España

1st Stages 18 & 21

2nd Overall Danmark Rundt

1st Stage 2

4th Road race, National Championships
5th Grand Prix Impanis-Van Petegem
7th Grand Prix of Aargau Canton
9th Gran Premio Bruno Beghelli
2017 (2)
1st Clásica de Almería
1st Stage 3 Volta a la Comunitat Valenciana
2nd London–Surrey Classic
10th Gran Premio Bruno Beghelli
2018 (4)
1st Stage 15 Tour de France
1st Stage 5 BinckBank Tour
1st Stage 2 Tour de Yorkshire
1st Stage 4 Tour of Oman
2nd Overall Dubai Tour

1st Young rider classification

8th Milan–San Remo
2019 (1)
1st Stage 4 Paris–Nice
1st Mountains classification, Deutschland Tour
2020 (2)
Étoile de Bessèges

1st Points classification
1st Stage 2

1st Stage 16 Vuelta a España
2021 (5)
Vuelta a España

1st Stages 6, 12 & 19
Overall Combativity award

1st Stage 8 Paris–Nice
1st Stage 4 Route d'Occitanie
2022 (2)
Tour de France

1st Stage 10
Held after Stages 2–8
Combativity award Stages 3 & 5

1st Stage 1 O Gran Camiño
2nd Time trial, National Championships
5th Overall Danmark Rundt
6th Maryland Cycling Classic
2023 (3)
1st Stage 10 Giro d'Italia
3rd Overall Danmark Rundt
7th Figueira Champions Classic
9th Overall Volta ao Algarve

1st Points classification
1st Stages 2 & 3

2024 (5)
1st Overall Arctic Race of Norway

1st Points classification
1st Stage 4

1st Veneto Classic
1st Stage 2 Critérium du Dauphiné
2nd Overall Danmark Rundt

1st Stage 2

3rd Bretagne Classic
5th Road race, National Championships
8th Overall Tour of Norway
Combativity award Stage 13 Tour de France
2025 (3)
2nd Eschborn–Frankfurt
3rd Overall O Gran Camiño

1st Points classification
1st Stages 1, 2 & 5

6th Milan–San Remo
6th Strade Bianche
10th Tour du Doubs
2026 (2)
1st Road race, National Championships
1st Stage 2 Volta a Catalunya

==== Grand Tour general classification results timeline ====
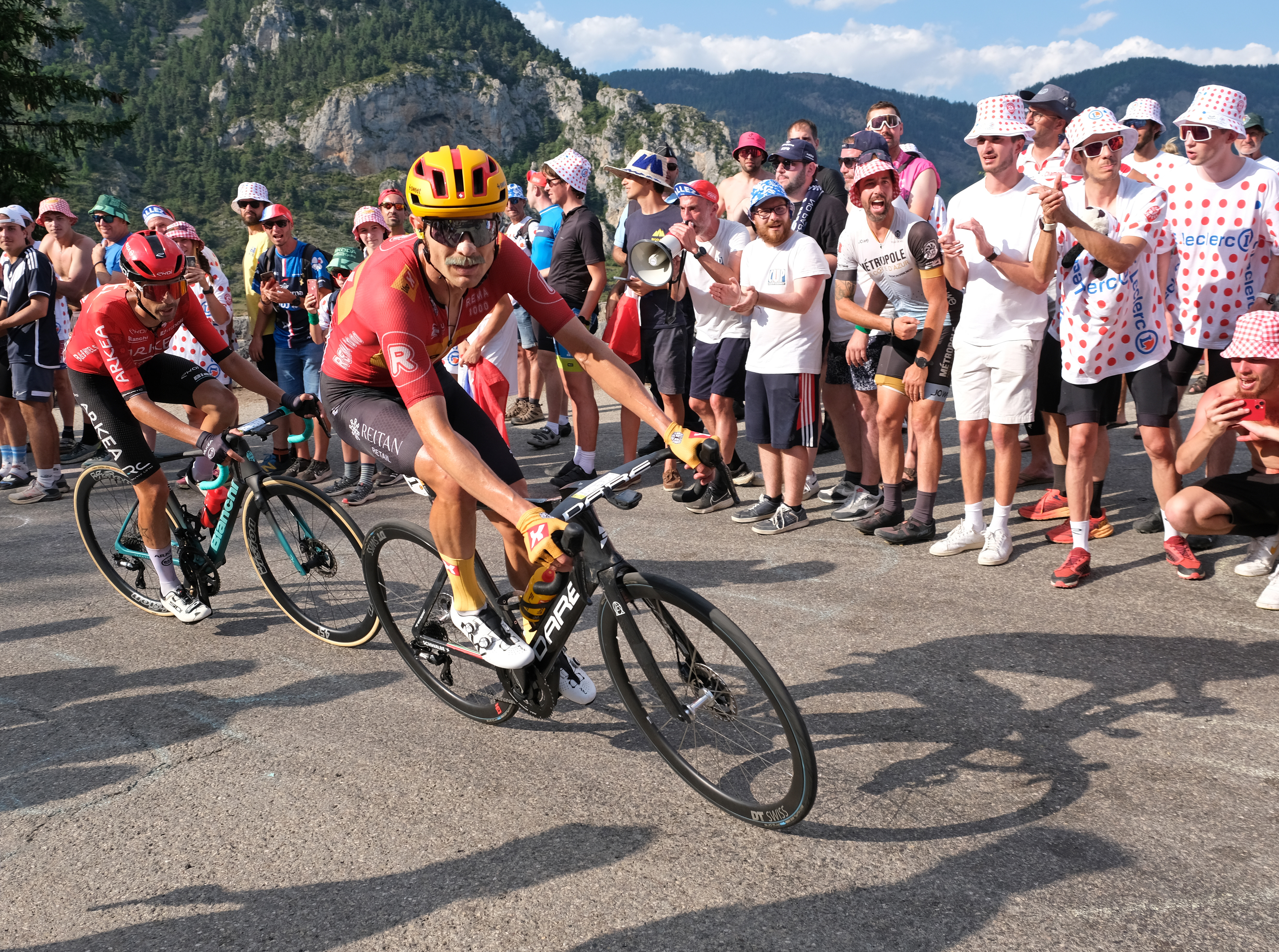
Magnus Cort in 2024 Tour de France

Grand Tour	2016	2017	2018	2019	2020	2021	2022	2023	2024	2025
Giro d'Italia	—	—	—	—	—	—	95	62	—	—
Tour de France	—	—	68	104	—	56	DNF	96	57	130
Vuelta a España	133	126	—	—	67	77	—	—	—	

==== Classics results timeline ====
Monument	2015	2016	2017	2018	2019	2020	2021	2022	2023	2024	2025
Milan–San Remo	—	—	11	8	15	100	61	—	14	—	6
Tour of Flanders	102	53	30	20	108	—	—	—	—	—	—
Paris–Roubaix	132	43	DNF	DNF	DNF	—	NH	—	—	—	—
Liège–Bastogne–Liège	—	—	—	—	—	—	—	—	—	—	84
Giro di Lombardia	—	—	—	—	—	OTL	—	—	—	—	—
Classic	2015	2016	2017	2018	2019	2020	2021	2022	2023	2024	2025
Strade Bianche	34	—	—	—	—	DNF	—	—	—	27	6
Eschborn–Frankfurt	NH	—	—	—	18	NH	—	—	—	—	2
Bretagne Classic	10	—	—	DNF	—	—	—	46	—	3	

Legend
—	Did not compete
DNF	Did not finish
