= 2013 Danmark Rundt =

2013 UCI Europe Tour

Race details
- Dates: 31 July – 4 August 2013
- Stages: 6
- Distance: 837 km (520 mi)

Results
Jersey awarded to the overall winner	Winner	Wilco Kelderman (NED)	(Belkin Pro Cycling)
	Second	Lars Bak (DEN)	(Lotto–Belisol)
	Third	Matti Breschel (DEN)	(Saxo–Tinkoff)
Jersey awarded to the points classification winner	Points	Wilco Kelderman (NED)	(Belkin Pro Cycling)
Jersey awarded to the mountains classification winner	Mountains	Martin Mortensen (DEN)	(Concordia Forsikring–Riwal)
Jersey awarded to the young rider classification winner	Young rider	Wilco Kelderman (NED)	(Belkin Pro Cycling)
	Team	Bardiani Valvole–CSF Inox	

The 2013 Danmark Rundt was a men's road bicycle race held from 31 July to 4 August 2013. It was the 23rd edition of the men's stage race, which was established in 1985. The race was rated as a 2.HC event and formed part of the 2013 UCI Europe Tour.

The race was won by Dutch rider Wilco Kelderman of the Belkin Pro Cycling Team with Danish riders Lars Bak of Lotto–Belisol and Matti Breschel of Team Saxo–Tinkoff finishing second and third.

The race was made up of six stages over five days and covered a total of 837 kilometres (520 mi), including an individual time trial. It featured sixteen teams, including seven UCI Pro teams.

== Schedule ==
Stage	Route	Distance	Date	Winner
1	Silkeborg > Varde	180	31 July	Magnus Cort (DEN)
2	Ribe > Sønderborg	180	1 August	Matti Breschel (DEN)
3	Sønderborg > Vejle	200	2 August	Matti Breschel (DEN)
4	Høng > Asnæs Indelukke	105	3 August	Magnus Cort (DEN)
5 (ITT)	Holbæk	12.1	3 August	Wilco Kelderman (NED)
6	Roskilde > Frederiksberg	165	4 August	Mark Cavendish (GBR)

== Teams ==
16 teams raced in the 2013 Danmark Rundt: 7 UCI ProTeams, 5 UCI Professional Continental Teams, 4 UCI Continental Teams along with a Danish national team under the Team Post Danmark name.

UCI ProTeams
- (Denmark) Saxo–Tinkoff
- (Netherlands) Vacansoleil–DCM
- (United States) Garmin–Sharp
- (Netherlands) Belkin Pro Cycling
- (Russia) Team Katusha
- (Belgium) Lotto–Belisol
- (Belgium) Omega Pharma–Quick-Step
UCI Professional Continental Teams
- (Republic of Ireland) Bardiani Valvole–CSF Inox
- (Belgium) Topsport Vlaanderen–Baloise
- (France) Team Europcar
- (United States) Team Novo Nordisk
- (Switzerland) IAM Cycling
UCI Continental Teams
- (Denmark) Team Cult Energy
- (Denmark) Concordia Forsikring–Riwal
- (Denmark) Team Tre-For
- (Denmark) Blue Water Cycling
National Team
- (Denmark) Team Post Danmark

== Classification leadership ==
Stage	Winner	General classification	Points classification	Mountains classification	Young rider classification	Team classification	Most Aggressive classification
1	Magnus Cort	Magnus Cort	Nikola Aistrup	Magnus Cort	Magnus Cort	Lotto–Belisol	Jimmi Sørensen
2	Matti Breschel	Magnus Cort	Nikola Aistrup	Magnus Cort	Magnus Cort	Lotto–Belisol	Matthias Brändle
3	Matti Breschel	Matti Breschel	Matti Breschel	Søren Kragh Andersen	Wilco Kelderman	Bardiani Valvole–CSF Inox	Matthias Brändle
4	Magnus Cort	Matti Breschel	Matti Breschel	Søren Kragh Andersen	Wilco Kelderman	Bardiani Valvole–CSF Inox	Sacha Modolo
5	Wilco Kelderman	Wilco Kelderman	Wilco Kelderman	Søren Kragh Andersen	Wilco Kelderman	Bardiani Valvole–CSF Inox	Matthias Brändle
6	Mark Cavendish	Wilco Kelderman	Wilco Kelderman	Martin Mortensen	Wilco Kelderman	Bardiani Valvole–CSF Inox	Martin Mortensen
Final		Wilco Kelderman	Wilco Kelderman	Martin Mortensen	Wilco Kelderman	Bardiani Valvole–CSF Inox	Martin Mortensen

== Final standings ==
The general classification was won by Wilco Kelderman of Belkin Pro Cycling Team by six seconds from Lars Bak of Lotto–Belisol with Matti Breschel of Team Saxo–Tinkoff another nine seconds behind in third place. Kelderman also won the points jersey by two points from Breschel and the young riders award. The race was Kelderman's first professional tour victory.

Danish rider Martin Mortensen of Riwal Cycling Team won the mountain classification and the fighters award. The team race was won by Bardiani Valvole–CSF Inox by 16 seconds from Vacansoleil–DCM.
