= Jacob Nielsen (cyclist) =

Danish cyclist (born 1978)

Personal information
- Full name: Jacob Nielsen larsen
- Born: 12 January 1978 (age 48) Horsens, Denmark

Cycling career
- Sport: Cycling
- Current team: Retired
- Discipline: Road
- Role: Rider

Professional teams
- 2000–2011: Cycling Horsens
- 2012–2013: Blue Water Cycling

Jacob Nielsen Larsen (born 12 January 1978, in Horsens) is a Danish former cyclist.

== Palmares ==
2002
2nd Poreč Trophy 5
2004
1st Stage 4 International Cycling Classic
2006
1st Stage 2 Tour of Siam
1st Stage 11 International Cycling Classic
1st Stage 5 Tour d'Indonesia
2007
1st Stage 6 Tour de la Martinique
3rd Overall Tour of South China Sea
2009
1st Grand Prix Copenhagen-Odsherred Classic
