= Kim Nielsen (cyclist) =

Danish cyclist

Personal information
- Full name: Kim Marius Nielsen
- Born: 16 January 1986 (age 40)

Cycling career
- Sport: Cycling
- Current team: Retired
- Discipline: Road
- Role: Rider

Professional teams
- 2005–2008: Glud & Marstrand–Horsens
- 2009: Team Designa Køkken

Kim Marius Nielsen (born 16 January 1986) is a Danish former cyclist.

== Major results ==
2007
Tour of South China Sea

1st stages 3, 4 and 5

2008
1st stage 3 Istrian Spring Trophy
1st stage 5 Tour de Berlin
