= Coupe des nations Ville Saguenay =

Bicycle race held in Saguenay, Quebec, Canada

Race details
- Date: Early June
- Region: Quebec, Canada
- Discipline: Road
- Competition: UCI America Tour 2.Ncup
- Type: Stage race
- Web site: www.grandprixcyclistesaguenay.com

History
- First edition: 2008
- Editions: 6
- Final edition: 2013
- First winner: Thomas Kvist (DEN)
- Most wins: No repeat winners
- Final winner: Sondre Holst Enger (NOR)

The Coupe des nations Ville Saguenay was a bicycle stage race held annually in Saguenay, Quebec, Canada. It was part of the UCI America Tour and the race was reserved to riders between 19 and 22 of age and was rated 2.Ncup by the UCI. It was the only U23 race held outside of Europe.

In 2014, the race was no longer part of the Nations' Cup calendar, and instead, was held as the Grand Prix Cycliste de Saguenay.

== Results ==
Year	Winner	Second	Third
2008	Thomas Kvist (DEN)	Rui Costa (POR)	Alfredo Balloni (ITA)
2009	Johan Le Bon (FRA)	Nico Keinath (GER)	Sergio Henao (COL)
2010	Luka Mezgec (SLO)	Camilo Suárez (COL)	Ben King (USA)
2011	Christopher Juul Jensen (DEN)	Arman Kamyshev (KAZ)	Miras Bederbekov (KAZ)
2012	Arman Kamyshev (KAZ)	Julian Alaphilippe (FRA)	Alexey Lutsenko (KAZ)
2013	Sondre Holst Enger (NOR)	Alexis Gougeard (FRA)	Diego Ochoa (COL)
