= Velothon Wales =

British one-day road cycling race

Race details
- Date: June (2015); May (2016); July (2017)
- Region: Wales, United Kingdom
- Discipline: Road race
- Competition: UCI Europe Tour
- Type: Single-day
- Organiser: Lagardère Unlimited
- Race director: Roland Hofer

History
- First edition: 2015
- Editions: 3
- Final edition: 2017
- First winner: Martin Mortensen (DEN)
- Most wins: No repeat winners
- Final winner: Ian Bibby (GBR)

Velothon Wales was a single-day road bicycle race held between 2015 and 2017 in Wales, United Kingdom. It was part of the UCI Europe Tour as a 1.1 race. It was part of the UCI Velothon Majors series of races organised by Lagardère Unlimited, which also includes Velothon Berlin, Velothon Stockholm and Velothon Vienna. These events are characterised by mass-participation sportives before an elite race along a lengthened route. No professional race was held as part of its 2018 edition, with the event folding after this edition.

== Winners ==
Year	Country	Rider	Team
2015	Denmark	Martin Mortensen	Cult Energy Pro Cycling
2016	Great Britain	Tom Stewart	Madison Genesis
2017	Great Britain	Ian Bibby	JLT–Condor
2018	No race due to being held as a sportive only		
