= Skive–Løbet =

Danish one-day road cycling race

Skive Løbet
Race details
- Date: April/May
- Region: Denmark
- Discipline: Road race
- Competition: UCI Europe Tour
- Type: Single-day
- Web site: www.skive-loebet.dk

History
- First edition: 1998
- Editions: 17 (as of 2021)
- First winner: Jakob Piil (DEN)
- Most wins: No repeat winners
- Most recent: Elmar Reinders (NED)

Skive Løbet is a professional single-day cycling race held annually in Denmark. It is part of the UCI Europe Tour in category 1.2.

== Winners ==
Year	Country	Rider	Team
1998	Denmark	Jakob Piil	
1999– 2001	No race		
2002	Denmark	Jacob Nielsen	
2003	Denmark	Jannik Skovlund	
2004	No race		
2005	Denmark	Morten Mikkelsen	
2006	Denmark	Michael Mørkøv	
2007	Denmark	Rune Udby	
2008– 2009	No race		
2010	Denmark	Andreas Frisch	
2011	Denmark	Guytan Lilholt	
2012	Denmark	Sebastian Lander	Glud & Marstrand–LRØ
2013	Denmark	Patrick Clausen	Team Cult Energy
2014	Germany	Phil Bauhaus	Team Stölting
2015	Denmark	Alexander Kamp	Team ColoQuick
2016	Netherlands	Johim Ariesen	Metec–TKH
2017	Denmark	Martin Toft Madsen	BHS–Almeborg Bornholm
2018	Denmark	Rasmus Bøgh Wallin	Team ColoQuick
2019	Denmark	Frederik Rodenberg	Team ColoQuick
2020	No race due to the COVID-19 pandemic in Denmark		
2021	Netherlands	Elmar Reinders	Riwal Cycling Team
