= Cult Energy Pro Cycling =

Cycling team

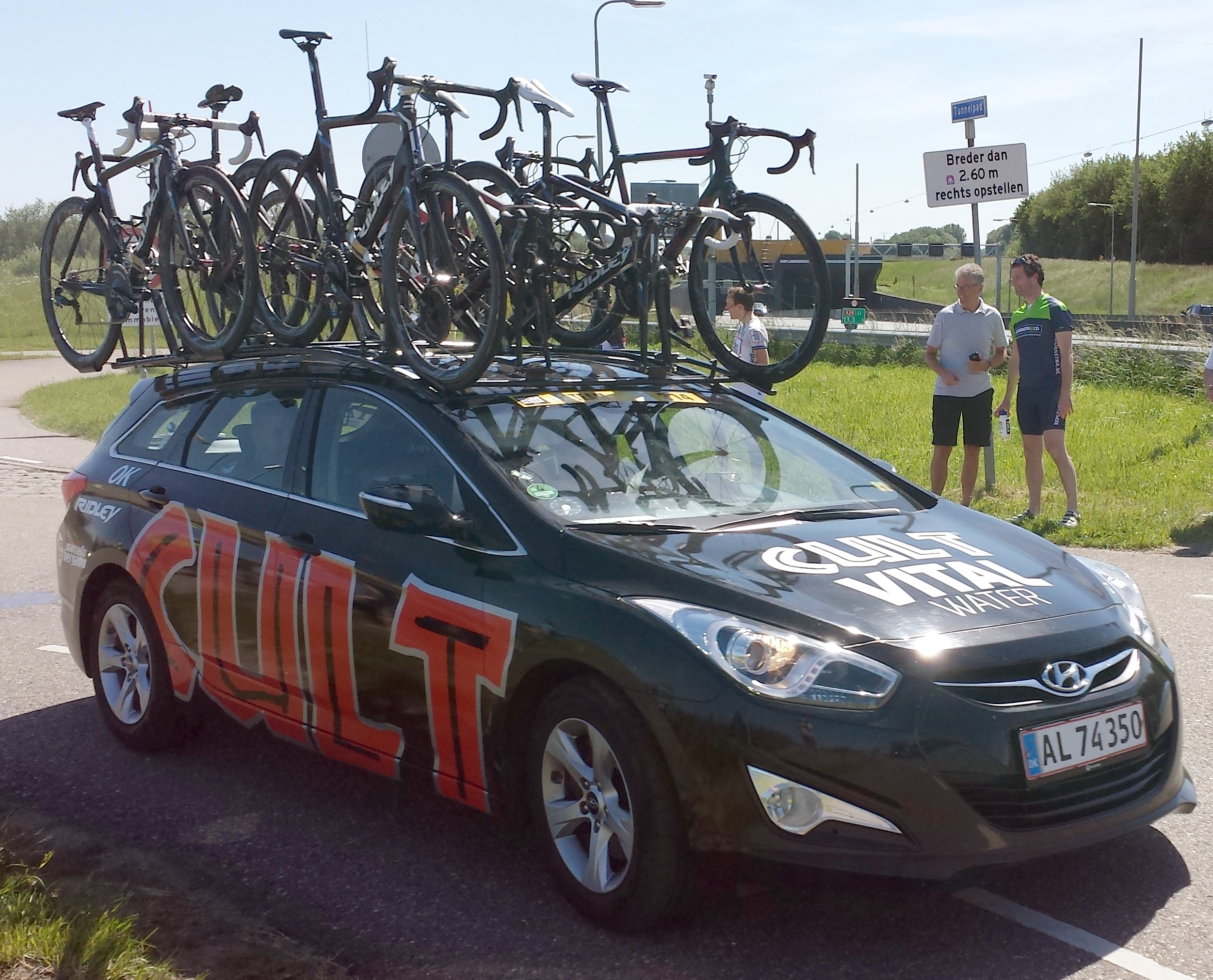

Team information
- UCI code: CUL
- Registered: Germany
- Founded: 2000
- Disbanded: 2015
- Discipline: Road
- Status: Continental (2000–2014); Pro Continental (2015)

Key personnel
- General manager: Christa Skelde
- Team manager: Christa Skelde

Team name history
- 2000 2001–2009 2010 2011–2012 2013 2014 2015: Cycling Horsens; Glud & Marstrand-Horsens; Glud & Marstrand-LRØ Radgivning; Glud & Marstrand-LRØ; Team Cult Energy; Cult Energy-Vital Water; Cult Energy Pro Cycling

Cult Energy Pro Cycling (UCI team code: CUL) was a professional road bicycle racing team licensed in Denmark, that competed in the UCI Continental Circuits. It was established in 2000 under the name of "Cycling Horsens".

On September 9, 2014, the team announced they had signed Linus Gerdemann from MTN–Qhubeka on a 2-year contract. On October 10, 2014, the team announced they had signed Gustav Larsson on a one-year contract

In August 2015, the team seemed to secure its survival after gaining sponsorship from German company Stölting Group, which sponsored the Continental team Stölting in 2015. As a result, the teams planned to join forces, giving the necessary budget to ensure the team could stay in the Professional Continental tier for 2016. However, in December 2015, Cult announced they would exit the sport and no longer be able to fund the team. Stölting then stepped in to fill the funding void, continuing the team under a German license. As a result, the Danish team disbanded.

== Team roster ==
As of 26 February 2015.

Rider	Date of birth
Michael Carbel (DEN)	7 February 1995 (aged 20)
Russell Downing (GBR)	23 August 1978 (aged 36)
Linus Gerdemann (GER)	16 September 1982 (aged 32)
Rasmus Guldhammer (DEN)	9 March 1989 (aged 25)
Karel Hník (CZE)	9 August 1991 (aged 23)
Alex Kirsch (LUX)	12 June 1992 (aged 22)
Gustav Larsson (SWE)	20 September 1980 (aged 34)
Romain Lecharmand (FRA)	26 July 1987 (aged 27)

Rider	Date of birth
Christian Mager (GER)	8 April 1992 (aged 22)
Martin Mortensen (DEN)	11 May 1984 (aged 30)
Mads Pedersen (DEN)	18 December 1995 (aged 19)
Rasmus Quaade (DEN)	7 January 1990 (aged 25)
Michael Reihs (DEN)	25 April 1979 (aged 35)
Troels Vinther (DEN)	24 February 1987 (aged 28)
Fabian Wegmann (GER)	20 June 1980 (aged 34)
Joël Zangerlé (LUX)	11 October 1988 (aged 26)

== Major wins ==
2004
Stage 10 Tour du Maroc, Max Nielsen
Stages 4 & 5 Tour of South China Sea, Max Nielsen
2005
Stage 5 Ringerike GP, Roy Hegreberg
2006
Stage 2 Tour of Siam, Jacob Nielsen
Stage 2 Ringerike GP, Haavard Nybø
Stage 5 Tour de Indonesia, Jacob Nielsen
2007
Stage 2 Tour of South China Sea, Morten Christiansen
Stages 3, 4 & 5 Tour of South China Sea, Kim Nielsen
2008
Stage 3 Istrian Spring Trophy, Kim Nielsen
2009
GP Bikebuster, Jacob Nielsen
2010
East Midlands Classic, Michael Berling
Overall Flèche du Sud, Lasse Bøchman
Stages 1 & 3 Festningsrittet, Troels Vinther
2011
Stage 2 Tour de Normandie, Thomas Kvist
Stage 1 Circuit des Ardennes, Troels Vinther
GP Herning, Troels Vinther
Stage 4 Rhône-Alpes Isère Tour, Thomas Kvist
Overall Flèche du Sud, Lasse Bøchman

Stage 3, Lasse Bøchman

2012
Denmark Road Race Championships, Sebastian Lander
Stage 2 Circuit des Ardennes, André Steensen
Liège–Bastogne–Liège Espoirs, Michael Valgren
Himmerland Rundt, André Steensen
Stage 1 Flèche du Sud, André Steensen
Stage 5 Flèche du Sud, Patrick Clausen
Overall Kreiz Breizh Elites, André Steensen

Stages 1 & 2 (ITT), André Steensen

2013
Grand Prix de la ville de Nogent-sur-Oise, Alexander Kamp
Liège–Bastogne–Liège Espoirs, Michael Valgren
Skive–Løbet, Patrick Clausen
Overall Flèche du Sud, Michael Valgren

Stage 3, Michael Valgren

Stages 1 & 4 Danmark Rundt, Magnus Cort
2014
Dorpenomloop Rucphen, Michael Carbel
Overall Istrian Spring Trophy, Magnus Cort

Stages 1 & 2, Magnus Cort

Stage 2 Circuit des Ardennes, Troels Vinther
Stage 2 Tour du Loir-et-Cher, Troels Vinther
Eschborn-Frankfurt City Loop U23, Mads Pedersen
Himmerland Rundt, Magnus Cort
Destination Thy, Magnus Cort
Ringerike GP, Magnus Cort
Stage 3 Tour des Fjords, Magnus Cort
Overall Ronde de l'Oise, Magnus Cort

Stages 3 & 4, Magnus Cort

Overall Czech Cycling Tour, Martin Mortensen

Stage 2, Martin Mortensen

Stage 1 Danmark Rundt, Magnus Cort
2015
Overall Tour de Luxembourg, Linus Gerdemann

Stage 2, Linus Gerdemann

Velothon Wales, Martin Mortensen
Sweden Time Trial Championships, Gustav Larsson

== National champions ==
2012
Denmark Road Race, Sebastian Lander
2015
Sweden Time Trial, Gustav Larsson
