= Flèche du Sud =

Bicycle race in Luxembourg

Race details
- Date: May
- Region: Luxembourg
- English name: South Arrow
- Discipline: Road
- Competition: UCI Europe Tour
- Type: Stage race
- Web site: www.fleche-du-sud.lu

History
- First edition: 1949
- Editions: 75 (as of 2026)
- First winner: Robert Bintz (LUX)
- Most wins: Charly Gaul (LUX); Edy Schütz (LUX); Roger Gilson (LUX); Alf Segersäll (SWE); Jan Ostergaard (DEN); Lasse Bøchman (DEN); Pim Ronhaar (NED) (2 wins)
- Most recent: Matisse Van Kerckhove (BEL)

The Flèche du Sud, is a road bicycle race held annually in Luxembourg. It is currently organised as a 2.1 event on the UCI Europe Tour, having upgraded from 2.2 status in 2026.

== Winners ==
Year	Country	Rider	Team
1949	Luxembourg	Robert Bintz	
1951	Luxembourg	Charly Gaul	
1952	Luxembourg	Roger Ludwig	
1953	Luxembourg	Charly Gaul	
1954	Netherlands	Willy Gramser	
1955	Luxembourg	Théo Simon	
1956	Netherlands	Rien van Grinsven	
1957	Luxembourg	Camille Jost	
1958	Belgium	Willy Vanden Berghen	
1959	Luxembourg	Walter Martinato	
1960	Luxembourg	Bruno Jacobs	
1961	West Germany	August Korte	
1962	Belgium	Nicolas Manzo	
1963	Luxembourg	Johny Schleck	
1964	Luxembourg	Edy Schütz	
1965	Luxembourg	Edy Schütz	
1966	West Germany	Ortwin Czarnowski	
1967	Luxembourg	Roger Gilson	
1968	France	Guy Boitrelle	
1969	Luxembourg	Roger Gilson	
1970	Switzerland	Walter Bürki	
1971	Netherlands	Fons van Katwijk	
1972	West Germany	Alfred Gaida	
1973	Luxembourg	Erny Kirchen	
1974	Netherlands	Johan van der Meer	
1975	Italy	Fausto Stiz	
1976	Italy	Luciano Sacher	
1977	Sweden	Alf Segersäll	
1978	Sweden	Alf Segersäll	
1979	Luxembourg	Conny Neiertz	
1980	Portugal	Acácio da Silva	
1981	Switzerland	Jean-Louis Schneiter	
1982	Great Britain	Neil Martin	
1983	Switzerland	Hartmut Bölts	
1984	Portugal	Francis da Silva	
1985	Netherlands	Wim Jennen	
1986	Netherlands	Rob Harmeling	
1987	West Germany	Hans-Werner Theisen	
1988	Switzerland	Lutz Nippen	
1989	Switzerland	Daniel Lanz	
1990	Switzerland	Alex Zülle	
1991	Netherlands	Robert de Poel	
1992	Denmark	Jan Østergaard	
1993	Netherlands	Lex Nederlof	
1994	Germany	Wolfgang Lohr	
1995	Germany	Klaus Diewald	
1996	Netherlands	Marc Lotz	
1997	Italy	David Dante	
1998	Denmark	Jan Østergaard	
1999	Luxembourg	Kim Kirchen	
2000	Italy	Giampaolo Cheula	
2001	Great Britain	Bradley Wiggins	
2002	Switzerland	Christian Weber	Kewa Rad Team
2003	Switzerland	David Loosli	Saeco Romers
2004	Luxembourg	Andy Schleck	Luxembourg national team
2005	Germany	Wolfram Wiese	ComNet-Senges
2006	Great Britain	Geraint Thomas	Great Britain national team
2007	Russia	Boris Shpilevsky	Kio Ene-DMT
2008	Switzerland	Marcel Wyss	Atlas-Romer's Hausbäckerei
2009	Switzerland	Simon Zahner	Bürgis Cycling
2010	Denmark	Lasse Bøchman	Glud & Marstrand–LRØ Radgivning
2011	Denmark	Lasse Bøchman	Glud & Marstrand–LRØ
2012	Luxembourg	Bob Jungels	Leopard–Trek Continental Team
2013	Denmark	Michael Valgren	Team Cult Energy
2014	Belgium	Gaëtan Bille	Verandas Willems
2015	Spain	Víctor de la Parte	Team Vorarlberg
2016	Portugal	Sérgio Sousa	Team Vorarlberg
2017	Ukraine	~~Matija Kvasina~~ Mark Padun	Team Colpack
2018	Belgium	Gianni Marchand	Cibel–Cebon
2019	Belgium	Quinten Hermans	Telenet–Fidea Lions
2020– 2021	No race due to the COVID-19 pandemic in Luxembourg		
2022	Belgium	Thibau Nys	Baloise–Trek Lions
2023	Netherlands	Pim Ronhaar	Baloise–Trek Lions
2024	Netherlands	Pim Ronhaar	Baloise–Trek Lions
2025	Netherlands	Martijn Rasenberg	Parkhotel Valkenburg
2026	Belgium	Matisse Van Kerckhove	Visma–Lease a Bike
