= GP Herning =

Race details
- Date: April–May
- Region: Herning, Denmark
- English name: GP Herning
- Local name: Grand Prix i Herning (in Danish)
- Discipline: Road
- Competition: DCU Tour
- Type: Single-day
- Web site: www.gpherning.dk

History
- First edition: 1992
- Editions: 32 (as of 2026)
- First winner: Claus Michael Møller (DEN)
- Most wins: Bjarne Riis (DEN) (3 wins)
- Most recent: Mads Landbo (DEN)

Grand Prix Herning is a one-day road bicycle race held in Midtjylland, Denmark.

The race is organised by Herning Bicycle Club with both start and goal in Herning.

The race is characterised by its gravel paths, which result in multiple punctures for the racers. The many paths and defects makes the race very selective, and it is often won by a solo rider or from a small group.

Grand Prix Herning gained prominence with Bjarne Riis's victories in 1996 (the same year that he won Tour de France), 1997 and 1998.

For several years the race was run as part of the UCI's calendar, with a fixed spot for the coming spring. It has gained the nickname "A spring day at the heath" (En Forårsdag på heden) with the hidden hint to Jørgen Leth's film on Paris–Roubaix, A Sunday in Hell (En Forårsdag i Helvede).

The race has had multiple economic problems and was not held in 2008. The race was returned in 2009, and was held until another break again in 2012 due to the Giro D’Italia start*11 in the city. In 2013 the race was run as a UCI race for the last time.

In 2014 the race got a helping hand from the Danish Cycling Federation which wrote the race in as part of the Post Cup (today known as the PostNord Cup). The race is now a returning part of the Danish Cup Series.

== Gravel paths ==
Gravel Road no.	KM Cycled	Category	Road	Distances
1	12.8 km	2	Asbjergvej	0.74 km
-	13.6 km	-	Nøvlingholmvej	0.80 km
2	27 km	1	"En skovvej"	2.10 km
3	38.8 km	2	Nygårdsvej	2.31 km
4	48.9 km	2	Skovbyvej	1.93 km
5	74.9 km	3	Hveddevej	1.20 km
6	86.2 km	3	Lavlundvej	0.70 km
-	86.9 km	-	Julsgårdvej	1.31 km
7	94.6 km	3	Brandholmvej	0.68 km
8	98 km	HC	Den Gyldne Middelvej	1.34 km
-	99.4 km	-	Den Gyldne Middelvej	0.68 km
9	106 km	3	Nørregårdsvej	1.00 km
10	111.8 km	2	Sandfeldvej	1.60 km
-	113.3 km	-	Sdr. Greenvej	1.30 km
11	118.9 km	1	Gottenborgvej	2.47 km
12	125.3 km	1	Høgildgårdvej	3.76 km
13	147.9 km	2	Femhøj	1.73 km
14	154.3 km	2	Frølundvej	0.86 km
-	155.1 km	-	Frølundvej	0.62 km
15	157.4 km	1	"En markvej"	1.96 km
16	166.4 km	3	"En grussti"	0.62 km

== Winners ==
Year	Country	Rider	Team
1992	Denmark	Claus Michael Møller	Ordrup
1993	Denmark	Dennis Rasmussen	Aarhus CK
1994	Great Britain	Brian Smith	Motorola
1995	France	Fréderic Moncassin	Novell
1996	Denmark	Bjarne Riis	Team Telekom
1997	Denmark	Bjarne Riis	Team Telekom
1998	Denmark	Bjarne Riis	Team Telekom
1999	Denmark	Michael Sandstød	Team Home-Jack & Jones
2000	Denmark	Michael Sandstød	Memory Card-Jack & Jones
2001	Netherlands	Rudi Kemna	BankGiroLoterij-Batavus
2002	Netherlands	Rudi Kemna	BankGiroLoterij-Batavus
2003	Denmark	Frank Høj	Team Fakta
2004	Denmark	Frank Høj	Team CSC
2005	Denmark	Michael Blaudzun	Team CSC
2006	Denmark	Allan Johansen	Team CSC
2007	Norway	Kurt-Asle Arvesen	Team CSC
2008	No race		
2009	Denmark	René Jørgensen	Team Designa Køkken
2010	Denmark	Alex Rasmussen	Team Saxo Bank
2011	Denmark	Troels Vinther	Glud & Marstrand-LRØ
2012	No race		
2013	Denmark	Lasse Norman Hansen	Blue Water Cycling
2014	Denmark	Morten Øllegaard	Riwal Platform Cycling Team
2015	Denmark	Asbjørn Kragh Andersen	Blue Water Cycling
2016	Denmark	Mads Würtz Schmidt	Team Virtu Pro–Véloconcept
2017	Denmark	Michael Carbel	Team Virtu Pro–Véloconcept
2018	Denmark	Troels Vinther	Riwal CeramicSpeed
2019	Denmark	Andreas Stokbro	Riwal Readynez
2020	No race		
2021	Denmark	Mads Østergaard Kristensen	Team Coop
2022	Denmark	Andreas Stokbro	Team Coop
2023	Denmark	Mathias Norsgaard	Denmark (national team)
2024	Denmark	Rasmus Søjberg Pedersen	Denmark (national team)
2025	Denmark	Stian Rosenlund	Airtox–Carl Ras
2026	Denmark	Mads Landbo	Team ColoQuick
