= Himmerland Rundt =

Danish one-day road cycling race

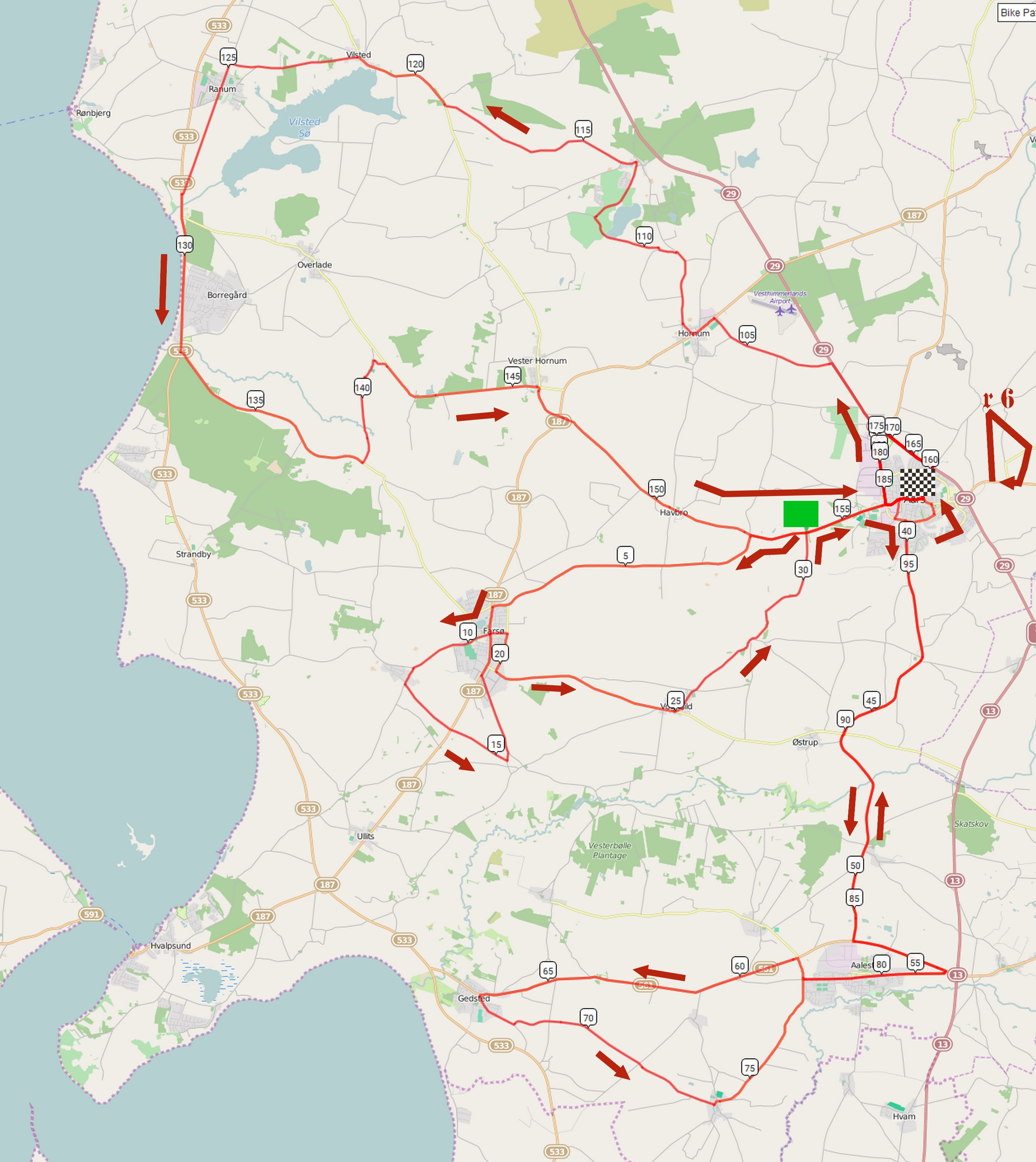
- Himmerland Rundt 2015

Race details
- Date: April/May
- Region: Denmark
- English name: Tour of Himmerland
- Local name(s): Himmerland Rundt (in Danish)
- Discipline: Road
- Competition: UCI Europe Tour
- Type: One-day race
- Web site: gphimmerlandrundt.dk

History
- First edition: 2011
- Editions: 10 (as of 2021)
- First winner: Michael Reihs (DEN)
- Most wins: No repeat winners
- Most recent: Mathias Larsen (DEN)

The Himmerland Rundt is a one-day road cycling race held annually in the Danish region of Himmerland. It is organized as a part of the UCI Europe Tour in category 1.2. It was first organized in 2011.

== Past winners ==
| Year | Country | Rider | Team |
|---|---|---|---|
| 2011 | Denmark | Michael Reihs | Christina Watches–Onfone |
| 2012 | Denmark | André Steensen | Glud & Marstrand–LRØ |
| 2013 | Netherlands | Yoeri Havik | Cycling Team De Rijke–Shanks |
| 2014 | Denmark | Magnus Cort | Cult Energy–Vital Water |
| 2015 | Netherlands | Wim Stroetinga | Parkhotel Valkenburg Continental Team |
| 2016 | Denmark | Jonas Gregaard | Riwal Platform |
| 2017 | Denmark | Nicolai Brøchner | Riwal Platform |
| 2018 | Netherlands | André Looij | Monkey Town Continental Team |
| 2019 | Denmark | Niklas Larsen | Team ColoQuick |
| 2020 | No race due to the COVID-19 pandemic | | |
| 2021 | Denmark | Mathias Larsen | Restaurant Suri–Carl Ras |
