= 2018 UCI Europe Tour =

Road bicycle race series

- Fourteenth edition of the UCI Europe Tour

Details
- Dates: 25 January – 16 October 2018
- Location: Europe
- Races: 400

The 2018 UCI Europe Tour was the fourteenth season of the UCI Europe Tour. The 2018 season began on 25 January 2018 with the Trofeo Porreres, Felanitx, Ses Salines, Campos and ended on 16 October 2018 with the Nationale Sluitingsprijs.

French rider Nacer Bouhanni (Cofidis), who scored 1,124 points in the 2017 edition, is the defending champion from the 2017 UCI Europe Tour.

Throughout the season, points are awarded to the top finishers of stages within stage races and the final general classification standings of each of the stages races and one-day events. The quality and complexity of a race also determines how many points are awarded to the top finishers, the higher the UCI rating of a race, the more points are awarded.

The UCI ratings from highest to lowest are as follows:

- Multi-day events: 2.HC, 2.1 and 2.2
- One-day events: 1.HC, 1.1 and 1.2

== Events ==
=== January ===
Date	Race name	Location	UCI Rating	Winner	Team	Ref
25 January	Trofeo Porreres, Felanitx, Ses Salines, Campos	Spain	1.1	John Degenkolb (GER)	Trek–Segafredo	
26 January	Trofeo Serra de Tramuntana	Spain	1.1	Tim Wellens (BEL)	Lotto–Soudal	
27 January	Trofeo Lloseta-Andratx	Spain	1.1	Toms Skujiņš (LAT)	Trek–Segafredo	
28 January	Trofeo Palma	Spain	1.1	John Degenkolb (GER)	Trek–Segafredo	
28 January	GP Cycliste la Marseillaise	France	1.1	Alexandre Geniez (FRA)	AG2R La Mondiale	
31 January – 4 February	Volta a la Comunitat Valenciana	Spain	2.1	Alejandro Valverde (ESP)	Movistar Team	
31 January – 4 February	Étoile de Bessèges	France	2.1	Tony Gallopin (FRA)	AG2R La Mondiale	

=== February ===
Date	Race name	Location	UCI Rating	Winner	Team	Ref
8–11 February	Tour La Provence	France	2.1	Alexandre Geniez (FRA)	AG2R La Mondiale	
10 February	Vuelta a Murcia	Spain	1.1	Luis León Sánchez (ESP)	Astana	
11 February	Clásica de Almería	Spain	1.HC	Caleb Ewan (AUS)	Mitchelton–Scott	
11 February	Trofeo Laigueglia	Italy	1.HC	Moreno Moser (ITA)	Italy (national team)	
14–18 February	Volta ao Algarve	Portugal	2.HC	Michał Kwiatkowski (POL)	Team Sky	
14–18 February	Vuelta a Andalucía	Spain	2.HC	Tim Wellens (BEL)	Lotto–Soudal	
17–18 February	Tour du Haut Var	France	2.1	Jonathan Hivert (FRA)	Direct Énergie	
18 February	Grand Prix Alanya	Turkey	1.2	Kirill Pozdnyakov (AZE)	Synergy Baku	
18 February	GP Laguna	Croatia	1.2	Paolo Totò (ITA)	Sangemini–MG.K Vis Vega	
22–25 February	Tour of Antalya	Turkey	2.2	Artem Ovechkin (RUS)	Marathon–Tula	
24 February	Classic Sud-Ardèche	France	1.1	Romain Bardet (FRA)	AG2R La Mondiale	
25 February	Kuurne–Brussels–Kuurne	Belgium	1.HC	Dylan Groenewegen (NED)	LottoNL–Jumbo	
25 February	GP Izola	Slovenia	1.2	Dušan Rajović (SRB)	Adria Mobil	
25 February	Royal Bernard Drôme Classic	France	1.1	Lilian Calmejane (FRA)	Direct Énergie	
27 February	Le Samyn	Belgium	1.1	Niki Terpstra (NED)	Quick-Step Floors	
28 February	Trofej Umag	Croatia	1.2	Krister Hagen (NOR)	Team Coop	

=== March ===
Date	Race name	Location	UCI Rating	Winner	Team	Ref
2–4 March	Tour of Mediterrennean	Turkey	2.2	Onur Balkan (TUR)	Torku Şekerspor	
3 March	Poreč Trophy	Croatia	1.2	Emīls Liepiņš (LAT)	ONE Pro Cycling	
4 March	Dwars door West–Vlaanderen	Belgium	1.1	Rémi Cavagna (FRA)	Quick-Step Floors	
4 March	International Rhodes Grand Prix	Greece	1.2	Matteo Moschetti (ITA)	Polartec–Kometa	
4 March	Grand Prix de la Ville de Lillers	France	1.2	Jérémy Lecroq (FRA)	Vital Concept	
4 March	GP Industria & Artigianato	Italy	1.HC	Matej Mohorič (SLO)	Bahrain–Merida	
8–11 March	Istrian Spring Trophy	Croatia	2.2	Krister Hagen (NOR)	Team Coop	
9–11 March	International Tour of Rhodes	Greece	2.2	Mirco Maestri (ITA)	Bardiani–CSF	
11 March	Paris–Troyes	France	1.2	Adrien Petit (FRA)	Direct Énergie	
11 March	Dorpenomloop Rucphen	Netherlands	1.2	Mikkel Bjerg (DEN)	Hagens Berman Axeon	
11 March	Clássica da Arrábida	Portugal	1.2	Dmitry Strakhov (RUS)	Lokosphinx	
11 March	Grand Prix Side	Turkey	1.2	Stepan Astafyev (KAZ)	Vino–Astana Motors	
11 March	Ronde van Drenthe	Netherlands	1.HC	František Sisr (CZE)	CCC–Sprandi–Polkowice	
14 March	Nokere Koerse	Belgium	1.HC	Fabio Jakobsen (NED)	Quick-Step Floors	
14–18 March	Volta ao Alentejo	Portugal	2.2	Luís Mendonça (POR)	Aviludo–Louletano	
16 March	Handzame Classic	Belgium	1.HC	Álvaro José Hodeg (COL)	Quick-Step Floors	
18 March	Grand Prix de Denain – Porte du Hainaut	France	1.HC	Kenny Dehaes (BEL)	WB Aqua Protect Veranclassic	
18 March	La Popolarissima	Italy	1.2	Giovanni Lonardi (ITA)	Zalf Euromobil Désirée Fior	
19–25 March	Tour de Normandie	France	2.2	Tom Stewart (GBR)	JLT–Condor	
21 March	Driedaagse de Panne–Koksijde	Belgium	1.HC	Elia Viviani (ITA)	Quick-Step Floors	
22–25 March	Tour of Cartier – East Mediterrannean Cycling Prohect	Turkey	2.2	Cristian Raileanu (MDA)	Torku Şekerspor	
22–25 March	Settimana Internazionale di Coppi e Bartali	Italy	2.1	Diego Rosa (ITA)	Team Sky	
24 March	Classic Loire Atlantique	France	1.1	Rasmus Quaade (DEN)	BHS–Almeborg Bornholm	
25 March	Clássica Aldeias do Xisto	Portugal	1.2	Daniel Mestre (POR)	Efapel	
25 March	Cholet-Pays de la Loire	France	1.1	Thomas Boudat (FRA)	Direct Énergie	
29–30 March	Tour of Fatih Sultan Mehmet	Turkey	2.2	Galym Akhmetov (KAZ)	Astana City	
30 March	Route Adelie de Vitre	France	1.1	Silvan Dillier (SUI)	AG2R La Mondiale	
31 March	Gran Premio Miguel Induráin	Spain	1.1	Alejandro Valverde (ESP)	Movistar Team	
31 March	GP Slovakia	Slovakia	1.2	Maciej Paterski (POL)	Wibatech Merx 7R	
31 March	Volta Limburg Classic	Netherlands	1.1	Jan Tratnik (SLO)	CCC–Sprandi–Polkowice	
31 March – 2 April	Le Triptyque des Monts et Châteaux	Belgium	2.2U	Jasper Philipsen (BEL)	Hagens Berman Axeon	

=== April ===
Date	Race name	Location	UCI Rating	Winner	Team	Ref
1 April	La Roue Tourangelle	France	1.1	Marc Sarreau (FRA)	Groupama–FDJ	
1 April	GP Adria Mobil	Slovenia	1.2	Filippo Fortin (ITA)	Tirol Cycling Team	
1 April	Trofeo Piva	Italy	1.2U	Paolo Baccio (ITA)	Mastromarco FC Nibali Sensi Cipros	
2 April	Giro del Belvedere	Italy	1.2U	Robert Stannard (AUS)	Mitchelton–BikeExchange	
3–6 April	Circuit de la Sarthe	France	2.1	Guillaume Martin (FRA)	Wanty–Groupe Gobert	
3 April	Gran Premio Palio del Recioto	Italy	1.2U	Stefan de Bod (RSA)	Dimension Data for Qhubeka	
4 April	Scheldeprijs	Belgium	1.HC	Fabio Jakobsen (NED)	Quick-Step Floors	
6–8 April	Circuit des Ardennes	France	2.2	Anthony Maldonado (FRA)	St. Michel–Auber93	
7 April	Trofeo Edil C	Italy	1.2U	Alessandro Fedeli (ITA)	Trevigiani Phonix–Hemus 1896	
8 April	Klasika Primavera	Spain	1.1	Andrey Amador (CRC)	Movistar Team	
10 April	Paris–Camembert	France	1.1	Lilian Calmejane (FRA)	Direct Énergie	
11–15 April	Tour du Loir-et-Cher	France	2.2	Asbjørn Kragh Andersen (DEN)	Team Virtu Cycling	
11 April	Brabantse Pijl	Belgium	1.HC	Tim Wellens (BEL)	Lotto–Soudal	
13–15 April	GP Beiras e Serra da Estrela	Portugal	2.1	Dmitry Strakhov (RUS)	Lokosphinx	
14 April	Tour du Finistère	France	1.1	Jonathan Hivert (FRA)	Direct Énergie	
14 April	Liège–Bastogne–Liège U23	Belgium	1.2U	João Almeida (POR)	Hagens Berman Axeon	
15 April	Tro-Bro Léon	France	1.1	Christophe Laporte (FRA)	Cofidis	
16–20 April	Tour of the Alps	Italy	2.HC	Thibaut Pinot (FRA)	Groupama–FDJ	
17–22 April	Tour of Croatia	Croatia	2.HC	Kanstantsin Siutsou (BLR)	Bahrain–Merida	
19–22 April	Tour of Mersin	Turkey	2.2	Eduard Vorganov (RUS)	Minsk Cycling Club	
20–22 April	Vuelta a Castilla y León	Spain	2.1	Rubén Plaza (ESP)	Israel Cycling Academy	
21 April	GP Czech Republic	Czech Republic	1.2	Alois Kaňkovský (CZE)	Elkov–Author	
21 April	Arno Wallaard Memorial	Netherlands	1.2	Joshua Huppertz (GER)	Team Lotto–Kern Haus	
21–22 April	Tour du Jura	France	2.2	Carl Fredrik Hagen (NOR)	Joker Icopal	
22 April	Giro dell'Appeninno	Italy	1.1	Giulio Ciccone (ITA)	Bardiani–CSF	
22 April	Grand Prix Poland	Poland	1.2	Maciej Paterski (POL)	Wibatech Merx 7R	
22 April	Trofeo Città di San Vendemiano	Italy	1.2U	Alberto Dainese (ITA)	Zalf Euromobil Désirée Fior	
22 April	Rutland–Melton International CiCLE Classic	United Kingdom	1.2	Gabriel Cullaigh (GBR)	WIGGINS	
25 April	Gran Premio della Liberazione	Italy	1.2U	Alessandro Fedeli (ITA)	Trevigiani Phonix–Hemus 1896	
25 April–1 May	Tour de Bretagne	France	2.2	Fabien Schmidt (FRA)	Côtes d'Armor–Marie Morin	
27–29 April	Vuelta a Asturias	Spain	2.1	Richard Carapaz (ECU)	Movistar Team	
27 April–1 May	Toscana Terra di Ciclismo Eroica	Netherlands	2.2U	Andrea Bagioli (ITA)	Team Colpack	
28 April	Himmerland Rundt	Denmark	1.2	André Looij (NED)	Monkey Town Continental Team	
28–29 April	Belgrade–Banja Luka	Bosnia and Herzegovina	2.1	Gašper Katrašnik (SLO)	Adria Mobil	
28 April	PWZ Zuidenveld Tour	Netherlands	1.2	Stef Krul (NED)	Metec–TKH	
29 April–3 May	Carpathian Couriers Race	Poland	2.2U	Filip Maciejuk (POL)	Poland National Cycling Team	
29 April	Skive–Løbet	Denmark	1.2	Rasmus Bøgh Wallin (DEN)	Team ColoQuick	
29 April	Paris–Mantes-en-Yvelines	France	1.2	Gianni Marchand (BEL)	Cibel–Cebon	

=== May ===
Date	Race name	Location	UCI Rating	Winner	Team	Ref
1 May	Eschborn–Frankfurt Under-23	Germany	1.2U	Niklas Larsen (DEN)	Team Virtu Cycling	
1 May	Memoriał Andrzeja Trochanowskiego	Poland	1.2	Alois Kaňkovský (CZE)	Elkov–Author	
2 May	Memoriał Romana Siemińskiego	Poland	1.2	Alois Kaňkovský (CZE)	Elkov–Author	
2–6 May	Five Rings of Moscow	Russia	2.2	Andrey Prostokishin (RUS)		
3–6 May	Tour de Yorkshire	United Kingdom	2.1	Greg Van Avermaet (BEL)	BMC Racing Team	
3–6 May	Rhône-Alpes Isère Tour	France	2.2	Stephan Rabitsch (AUT)	Team Felbermayr–Simplon Wels	
3–6 May	Tour of Mesopotamia	Turkey	2.2	Nazim Bakırcı (TUR)	Torku Şekerspor	
4–6 May	Vuelta a la Comunidad de Madrid	Spain	2.1	Edgar Pinto (POR)	Vito–Feirense–BlackJack	
5 May	Sundvolden GP	Norway	1.2	Alexander Kamp (DEN)	Team Virtu Cycling	
6 May	Ringerike GP	Norway	1.2	Syver Wærsted (NOR)	Uno-X Norwegian Development Team	
6 May	Flèche Ardennaise	Belgium	1.2	Cees Bol (NED)	SEG Racing Academy	
6 May	Circuito del Porto-Trofeo Arvedi	Italy	1.2	Giovanni Lonardi (ITA)	Zalf Euromobil Désirée Fior	
8–13 May	Four Days of Dunkirk	France	2.HC	Dimitri Claeys (BEL)	Cofidis	
9–13 May	Flèche du Sud	Luxembourg	2.2	Gianni Marchand (BEL)	Cibel–Cebon	
11–13 May	Vuelta a Aragón	Spain	2.1	Jaime Rosón (ESP)	Movistar Team	
11–13 May	Szlakiem Grodów Piastowskich	Poland	2.2	Łukasz Owsian (POL)	CCC–Sprandi–Polkowice	
12 May	Scandinavian Race Uppsala	Sweden	1.2	Trond Trondsen (NOR)	Team Coop	
12 May	Ronde van Overijssel	Netherlands	1.2	Piotr Havik (NED)	BEAT Cycling Club	
12 May	Kerekparverseny	Hungary	1.2	František Sisr (CZE)	CCC–Sprandi–Polkowice	
13 May	Ronde van Noord-Holland	Netherlands	1.2	Julius van den Berg (NED)	SEG Racing Academy	
13 May	GP Industrie del Marmo	Italy	1.2U	Gregorio Ferri (ITA)	Zalf Euromobil Désirée Fior	
13 May	Grand Prix Criquielion	Belgium	1.2	Lionel Taminiaux (BEL)	AGO–Aqua Service	
15–20 May	Bałtyk–Karkonosze Tour	Poland	2.2	Philipp Walsleben (GER)	Corendon–Circus	
16–20 May	Tour of Norway	Norway	2.HC	Eduard Prades (ESP)	Euskadi–Murias	
17–20 May	Ronde de l'Isard	France	2.2U	Stephen Williams (GBR)	SEG Racing Academy	
18–20 May	Tour de l'Ain	France	2.1	Arthur Vichot (FRA)	Groupama–FDJ	
18–20 May	Paris-Arras Tour	France	2.2	Stephan Rabitsch (AUT)	Team Felbermayr–Simplon Wels	
19–23 May	Tour of Albania	Albania	2.2	Michele Gazzara (ITA)	Sangemini–MG.K Vis Vega	
20–27 May	Rás Tailteann	Ireland	2.2	Luuc Bugter (NED)	Delta Cycling Team	
20 May	Grote Prijs Marcel Kint	Belgium	1.1	Nacer Bouhanni (FRA)	Cofidis	
22–24 May	Tour des Fjords	Norway	2.HC	Michael Albasini (SWI)	Mitchelton–Scott	
23–27 May	Baloise Belgium Tour	Belgium	2.HC	Jens Keukeleire (BEL)	Lotto–Soudal	
24–26 May	Grand Prix Cycliste de Gemenc	Hungary	2.2	Rok Korošec (SLO)	My Bike–Stevens	
25–26 May	Tour of Estonia	Estonia	2.1	Grzegorz Stępniak (POL)	Wibatech Merx 7R	
25–27 May	Hammer Stavanger	Norway	2.1	Mitchelton–BikeExchange	—	
26 May	Grand Prix de Plumelec-Morbihan	France	1.1	Andrea Pasqualon (ITA)	Wanty–Groupe Gobert	
27 May	Boucles de l'Aulne	France	1.1	Kévin Le Cunff (FRA)	St. Michel–Auber93	
27 May	Circuit de Wallonie	Belgium	1.2	Mikkel Frølich Honoré (DEN)	Team Virtu Cycling	
27 May	Paris–Roubaix U23	France	1.2U	Stan Dewulf (BEL)	Belgium national team	
30 May–3 June	Tour de Luxembourg	Luxembourg	2.HC	Andrea Pasqualon (ITA)	Wanty–Groupe Gobert	
31 May–3 June	Szlakiem Walk Majora Hubala	Poland	2.1	Mateusz Taciak (POL)	CCC–Sprandi–Polkowice	
31 May–3 June	Boucles de la Mayenne	France	2.1	Mathieu van der Poel (NED)	Corendon–Circus	

=== June ===
Date	Race name	Location	UCI Rating	Winner	Team	Ref
1–3 June	Hammer Sportzone Limburg	Netherlands	2.1	Quick-Step Floors (BEL)		
1–3 June	Tour of Bihor	Romania	2.2	Iván Sosa (COL)	Androni Giocattoli–Sidermec	
1 June	Horizon Park Race for Peace	Ukraine	1.2	Frederik Muff (DEN)	Aura Energi-ck Aarhus	
2 June	Heistse Pijl	Belgium	1.1	Emīls Liepiņš (LAT)	ONE Pro Cycling	
2 June	Trofeo Alcide Degasperi	Italy	1.2	Simone Ravanelli (ITA)	Biesse–Carrera Gavardo	
2 June	Horizon Park Race Maidan	Ukraine	1.2	Branislau Samoilau (BLR)	Minsk Cycling Club	
3 June	Coppa della Pace	Italy	1.2	Matteo Sobrero (ITA)	Dimension Data for Qhubeka	
3 June	Gran Premio di Lugano	Switzerland	1.1	Hermann Pernsteiner (AUT)	Bahrain–Merida	
3 June	Memorial Philippe Van Coningsloo	Belgium	1.2	Gustav Höög (SWE)	Team Coop	
3 June	Horizon Park Race Classic	Ukraine	1.2	Branislau Samoilau (BLR)	Minsk Cycling Club	
7 June	GP du canton d'Argovie	Switzerland	1.HC	Alexander Kristoff (NOR)	UAE Team Emirates	
7–10 June	Ronde de l'Oise	France	2.2	Henrik Evensen (NOR)	Joker Icopal	
8–10 June	Tour of Małopolska	Poland	2.2	Amaro Antunes (POR)	CCC–Sprandi–Polkowice	
8–10 June	Tour de Serbie	Serbia	2.2	Nicolás Tivani (ARG)	Trevigiani Phonix–Hemus 1896	
9 June	Dwars door de Vlaamse Ardennen	Belgium	1.2	Robby Cobbaert (BEL)	Cibel–Cebon	
10 June	Rund um Köln	Germany	1.1	Sam Bennett (IRE)	Bora–Hansgrohe	
10 June	Ronde van Limburg	Belgium	1.1	Mathieu van der Poel (NED)	Corendon–Circus	
10 June	Midden–Brabant Poort Omloop	Netherlands	1.2	Julius van den Berg (NED)	SEG Racing Academy	
13–17 June	Tour of Slovenia	Slovenia	2.1	Primož Roglič (SVN)	LottoNL–Jumbo	
14–17 June	Route d'Occitanie	France	2.1	Alejandro Valverde (ESP)	Movistar Team	
14–17 June	Oberösterreichrundfahrt	Austria	2.2	Stephan Rabitsch (AUT)	Team Felbermayr–Simplon Wels	
15 June	Dwars door het Hageland	Belgium	1.1	Krists Neilands (LVA)	Israel Cycling Academy	
16 June	Memorial Grundmanna I Wizowskiego	Poland	1.2	Łukasz Owsian (POL)	CCC–Sprandi–Polkowice	
16 June	Fyen Rundt	Denmark	1.1	Mads Pedersen (DEN)	Trek–Segafredo	
17 June	GP Horsens Posten	Denmark	1.1	Herman Dahl (NOR)	Joker Icopal	
17 June	International Race Grand Prix Doliny Baryczy Milicz	Poland	1.2	Kamil Małecki (POL)	CCC–Sprandi–Polkowice	
17 June	Elfstedenronde	Belgium	1.1	Adam Blythe (GBR)	Aqua Blue Sport	
18–21 June	International Tour of Torku Mevlana	Turkey	2.2	Onur Balkan (TUR)	Torku Şekerspor	
19 June	Halle–Ingooigem	Belgium	1.1	Danny van Poppel (NED)	LottoNL–Jumbo	
20–24 June	Adriatica Ionica Race	Italy	2.1	Iván Sosa (COL)	Androni Giocattoli–Sidermec	
21–24 June	Tour de Savoie Mont-Blanc	France	2.2	Riccardo Zoidl (AUT)	Team Felbermayr–Simplon Wels	
24 June	Paris–Chauny	France	1.1	Ramon Sinkeldam (NED)	Groupama–FDJ	
27 June	Internationale Wielertrofee Jong Maar Moedig	Belgium	1.2	Jérôme Baugnies (BEL)	Wanty–Groupe Gobert	
30 June	Omloop Het Nieuwsblad Beloften	Belgium	1.2	Erik Nordsaeter Resell (NOR)	Uno-X Norwegian Development Team	

=== July ===
Date	Race name	Location	UCI Rating	Winner	Team	Ref
3 July	Trofeo Città di Brescia	Italy	1.2	Filippo Rocchetti (ITA)	Team Colpack	
4–7 July	Course de Solidarność	Poland	2.2	Sylwester Janiszewski (POL)	Wibatech Merx 7R	
5–8 July	Sibiu Cycling Tour	Romania	2.1	Iván Sosa (COL)	Androni Giocattoli–Sidermec	
7–14 July	Tour of Austria	Austria	2.1	Ben Hermans (BEL)	Israel Cycling Academy	
7 July	Grote Prijs Jean-Pierre Monseré	Belgium	1.1	Laurens Sweeck (BEL)	Pauwels Sauzen–Vastgoedservice	
8 July	Grand Prix Albert Fauville-Baulet	Belgium	1.2	Aksel Nõmmela (EST)	Canyon Eisberg	
8 July	Giro del Medio Brenta	Italy	1.2	Alexander Evtushenko (RUS)	Lokosphinx	
8 July	GP de la ville de Nogent-sur-Oise	France	1.2	Julien Antomarchi (FRA)	Roubaix–Lille Métropole	
10–15 July	Giro della Valle d'Aosta	Italy	2.2U	Vadim Pronskiy (KAZ)	Astana City	
12–15 July	Troféu Joaquim Agostinho	Portugal	2.2	José Fernandes (POR)	W52 / FC Porto	
18–22 July	GP Nacional 2 de Portugal	Portugal	2.2	Raúl Alarcón (ESP)	W52 / FC Porto	
22 July	V4 Special Series Debrecen – Ibrany	Hungary	1.2	Péter Kusztor (HUN)	My Bike–Stevens	
22 July	Grand Prix de la ville de Pérenchies	France	1.2	Kenny Dehaes (BEL)	WB Aqua Protect Veranclassic	
25–28 July	Dookoła Mazowsza	Poland	2.2	Szymon Sajnok (POL)	CCC–Sprandi–Polkowice	
25 July	Prueba Villafranca de Ordizia	Spain	1.1	Rob Power (AUS)	Mitchelton Scott	
26 July	Grand Prix Pino Cerami	Belgium	1.1	Peter Kennaugh (GBR)	Bora–Hansgrohe	
28–30 July	Kreiz Breizh Elites	France	2.2	Damien Touzé (FRA)	St. Michel–Auber93	
28 July–1 August	Tour de Wallonie	Belgium	2.HC	Tim Wellens (BEL)	Lotto–Soudal	
29 July	GP Kranj	Slovenia	1.2	Daniel Auer (AUT)	WSA–Pushbikers	
31 July	Circuito de Getxo	Spain	1.1	Alex Aranburu (ESP)	Caja Rural–Seguros RGA	

=== August ===
Date	Race name	Location	UCI Rating	Winner	Team	Ref
1–5 August	Danmark Rundt	Denmark	2.HC	Wout van Aert (BEL)	Vérandas Willems–Crelan	
1–12 August	Volta a Portugal	Portugal	2.1	Raúl Alarcón (ESP)	W52 / FC Porto	
1–5 August	Tour Alsace	France	2.2	Geoffrey Bouchard (FRA)	AG2R La Mondiale	
4 August	Hansa Bygg Kalmar Grand Prix	Sweden	1.2	Gustav Höög (SWE)	Team Coop	
5 August	La Poly Normande	France	1.1	Pierre-Luc Périchon (FRA)	Fortuneo–Samsic	
5 August	Antwerpse Havenpijl	Belgium	1.2	Tibo Nevens (BEL)	Home Solution–Soenens	
7–11 August	Tour of Szeklerland	Romania	2.2	Nicolae Tanovițchii (MDA)	Team Novak	
7–11 August	Vuelta a Burgos	Spain	2.HC	Iván Sosa (COL)	Androni Giocattoli–Sidermec	
9–12 August	Czech Cycling Tour	Czech Republic	2.1	Riccardo Zoidl (AUT)	Team Felbermayr–Simplon Wels	
11 August	Memoriał Henryka Łasaka	Poland	1.2	Mateusz Grabis (POL)	Voster ATS Team	
11 August	KOGA Slag om Norg	Netherlands	1.1	Jan-Willem van Schip (NED)	Roompot–Nederlandse Loterij	
12 August	Coupe des Carpathes	Poland	1.2	Maciej Paterski (POL)	Wibatech Merx 7R	
12 August	Gran Premio di Poggiana	Italy	1.2U	Robert Stannard (AUS)	Mitchelton–BikeExchange	
14–19 August	Tour de Hongrie	Hungary	2.1	Manuel Belletti (ITA)	Androni Giocattoli–Sidermec	
15–18 August	Tour du Limousin	France	2.1	Nicolas Edet (FRA)	Cofidis	
16 August	GP Capodarco	Italy	1.2U	Einer Rubio (COL)	Vejus–TMF	
16–19 August	Arctic Race of Norway	Norway	2.HC	Sergey Chernetskiy (RUS)	Astana	
17–26 August	Tour de l'Avenir	France	2.Ncup	Tadej Pogačar (SLO)	Slovenia (national team)	
18 August	Puchar Ministra Obrony Narodowej	Poland	1.2	Cancelled		
18 August	Minsk Cup	Belarus	1.2	Maciej Paterski (POL)	Wibatech Merx 7R	
19 August	Grand Prix Minsk	Belarus	1.2	Nikolai Shumov (BLR)	Minsk Cycling Club	
21–26 August	Baltic Chain Tour	Estonia	2.2	Emīls Liepiņš (LAT)	ONE Pro Cycling	
21–24 August	Tour du Poitou-Charentes	France	2.1	Arnaud Démare (FRA)	Groupama–FDJ	
21 August	Grand Prix des Marbriers	France	1.2	Jon Mould (GBR)	JLT–Condor	
21 August	Grote Prijs Stad Zottegem	Belgium	1.1	Jérôme Baugnies (BEL)	Wanty–Groupe Gobert	
22 August	Veenendaal–Veenendaal Classic	Netherlands	1.1	Dylan Groenewegen (NED)	LottoNL–Jumbo	
23–26 August	Deutschland Tour	Germany	2.1	Matej Mohorič (SLO)	Bahrain–Merida	
24 August	Great War Remembrance Race	Belgium	1.1	Mihkel Räim (EST)	Israel Cycling Academy	
25 August	Omloop Mandel-Leie-Schelde	Belgium	1.1	Wouter Wippert (NED)	Roompot–Nederlandse Loterij	
26 August	Schaal Sels Merksem	Belgium	1.1	Timothy Dupont (BEL)	Wanty–Groupe Gobert	
26 August	Ronde van Midden-Nederland	Netherlands	1.2	Casper von Folsach (DEN)	Team ColoQuick	
26 August	Croatia–Slovenia	Slovenia	1.2	Dušan Rajović (SRB)	Adria Mobil	
29 August	Druivenkoers Overijse	Belgium	1.1	Xandro Meurisse (BEL)	Wanty–Groupe Gobert	
31 August	Hafjell GP	Norway	1.2	Martin Toft Madsen (DEN)	BHS–Almeborg Bornholm	

=== September ===
Date	Race name	Location	UCI Rating	Winner	Team	Ref
1 September	Brussels Cycling Classic	Belgium	1.HC	Pascal Ackermann (GER)	Bora–Hansgrohe	
1 September	Lillehammer GP	Norway	1.2	Alexander Kamp (DEN)	Team Waoo	
2 September	Grand Prix de Fourmies	France	1.HC	Pascal Ackermann (GER)	Bora–Hansgrohe	
2 September	Antwerp Port Epic	Belgium	1.1	Guillaume Van Keirsbulck (BEL)	Wanty–Groupe Gobert	
2 September	Gylne Gutuer	Norway	1.2	Jasper Philipsen (BEL)	Hagens Berman Axeon	
6–8 September	Giro del Friuli-Venezia Giulia	Italy	2.2	Tadej Pogačar (SLO)	Ljubljana Gusto Xaurum	
2–9 September	Tour of Britain	United Kingdom	2.HC	Julian Alaphilippe (FRA)	Quick-Step Floors	
5–9 September	Tour of South Bohemia	Czech Republic	2.2	Michael Kukrle (CZE)	Elkov–Author	
9 September	Tour du Doubs	France	1.1	Julien Simon (FRA)	Cofidis	
9 September	Chrono Champenois	France	1.2	Martin Toft Madsen (DEN)	BHS–Almeborg Bornholm	
12 September	Grand Prix de Wallonie	Belgium	1.1	Jasper Stuyven (BEL)	Trek–Segafredo	
14 September	Kampioenschap van Vlaanderen	Belgium	1.1	Dylan Groenewegen (NED)	LottoNL–Jumbo	
15 September	GP Impanis-Van Petegem	Belgium	1.HC	Taco van der Hoorn (NED)	Roompot–Nederlandse Loterij	
15 September	Coppa Ugo Agostoni	Italy	1.2	Gianni Moscon (ITA)	Team Sky	
11–16 September	Olympia's Tour	Netherlands	2.2U	Julius Johansen (DEN)	Team ColoQuick	
12–16 September	Okolo Slovenska	Slovakia	2.1	Julian Alaphilippe (FRA)	Quick-Step Floors	
13–16 September	Tour of Cappadocia	Turkey	2.2	Alexandr Ovsyannikov (KAZ)	Vino–Astana Motors	
16 September	Coppa Bernocchi	Italy	1.1	Sonny Colbrelli (ITA)	Bahrain–Merida	
16 September	Grote Prijs Jef Scherens	Belgium	1.1	Jasper Stuyven (BEL)	Trek–Segafredo	
16 September	Raiffeisen Grand Prix	Austria	1.2	Maciej Paterski (POL)	Wibatech Merx 7R	
19 September	Giro di Toscana	Italy	1.1	Gianni Moscon (ITA)	Team Sky	
19 September	Omloop van het Houtland	Belgium	1.1	Jonas van Genechten (BEL)	Vital Concept	
19–23 September	Tour of Romania	Romania	2.2	Serghei Țvetcov (ROM)	Romania (national team)	
20 September	Coppa Sabatini	Italy	1.1	Juan José Lobato (ESP)	Nippo–Vini Fantini–Europa Ovini	
22 September	Memorial Marco Pantani	Italy	1.1	Davide Ballerini (ITA)	Androni Giocattoli–Sidermec	
22 September	Tour de l'Eurométropole	Belgium	1.HC	Mads Pedersen (DEN)	Trek–Segafredo	
23 September	Duo Normand	France	1.1	Martin Toft Madsen (DEN); Rasmus Quaade (DEN)	BHS–PL Beton Bornholm	
23 September	Trofeo Matteotti	Italy	1.1	Davide Ballerini (ITA)	Androni Giocattoli–Sidermec	
23 September	Grand Prix d'Isbergues	France	1.1	Philippe Gilbert (BEL)	Quick-Step Floors	
23 September	Gooikse Pijl	Belgium	1.1	Jordi Meeus (BEL)	SEG Racing Academy	
23 September	Tour du Gévaudan Languedoc-Roussillon	France	1.2	Jaakko Hänninen (FIN)	Saint-Étienne Loire	
25 September	Ruota d'Oro	Italy	1.2U	Samuele Zoccarato (ITA)	General Store Bottoli Zardini	
27 September	Famenne Ardenne Classic	Belgium	1.1	Guillaume Boivin (CAN)	Israel Cycling Academy	
27–30 September	Tour of Black Sea	Turkey	2.2	Ramūnas Navardauskas (LIT)	Lithuania (national team)	

=== October ===
Date	Race name	Location	UCI Rating	Winner	Team	Ref
2 October	Binche–Chimay–Binche	Belgium	1.1	Danny van Poppel (NED)	LottoNL–Jumbo	
3 October	Münsterland Giro	Germany	1.HC	Max Walscheid (GER)	Team Sunweb	
4 October	Paris–Bourges	France	1.1	Valentin Madouas (FRA)	Groupama–FDJ	
6 October	Giro dell'Emilia	Italy	1.HC	Alessandro De Marchi (ITA)	BMC Racing Team	
6 October	Tour de Vendée	France	1.1	Nico Denz (GER)	AG2R La Mondiale	
7 October	Paris–Tours	France	1.HC	Søren Kragh Andersen (DEN)	Team Sunweb	
7 October	Gran Premio Bruno Beghelli	Italy	1.HC	Bauke Mollema (NED)	Trek–Segafredo	
7 October	Piccolo Giro di Lombardia	Italy	1.2U	Robert Stannard (AUS)	Mitchelton–BikeExchange	
7 October	Paris–Tours Espoirs	France	1.2U	Marten Kooistra (NED)	SEG Racing Academy	
9 October	Tre Valli Varesine	Italy	1.HC	Toms Skujiņš (LAT)	Trek–Segafredo	
10 October	Milano–Torino	Italy	1.HC	Thibaut Pinot (FRA)	Groupama–FDJ	
11 October	Giro del Piemonte	Italy	1.HC	Sonny Colbrelli (ITA)	Bahrain–Merida	
13 October	De Kustpijl	Belgium	1.2	Timothy Stevens (BEL)	Cibel–Cebon	
13 October	Tacx Pro Classic	Netherlands	1.1	Peter Schulting (NED)	Monkey Town Continental Team	
14 October	Chrono des Nations	France	1.1	Martin Toft Madsen (DEN)	BHS–Almeborg Bornholm	
14 October	Chrono des Nations Espoirs	France	1.2U	Mathias Norsgaard (DEN)	Riwal CeramicSpeed	

== Final standings ==
For the 2018 season, the standings are calculated based upon the UCI World Ranking, with the ranking period being the previous 52 weeks.

=== Individual classification ===
Rank	Name	Team	Points
1	Hugo Hofstetter (FRA)	Cofidis	1028
2	Pascal Ackermann (GER)	Bora–Hansgrohe	1020
3	Timothy Dupont (BEL)	Wanty–Groupe Gobert	996
4	Alejandro Valverde (ESP)	Movistar Team	959
5	Tim Wellens (BEL)	Lotto–Soudal	831
6	Andrea Pasqualon (ITA)	Wanty–Groupe Gobert	801
7	Sonny Colbrelli (ITA)	Bahrain–Merida	742.8
8	Thibaut Pinot (FRA)	Groupama–FDJ	715
9	Fabio Jakobsen (NED)	Quick-Step Floors	682
10	Kenny Dehaes (BEL)	WB Aqua Protect Veranclassic	673

=== Teams classification ===
Rank	Team	Points
1	Wanty–Groupe Gobert	4043
2	Cofidis	3434
3	Androni Giocattoli–Sidermec	3012
4	Direct Énergie	2846
5	Roompot–Nederlandse Loterij	2747
6	CCC–Sprandi–Polkowice	2304.97
7	Israel Cycling Academy	2266.71
8	Sport Vlaanderen–Baloise	2007
9	Nippo–Vini Fantini–Europa Ovini	1956.2
10	WB Aqua Protect Veranclassic	1840

=== Nations classification ===
Rank	Nation	Points
1	Belgium	5489
2	Italy	5335.8
3	France	5111
4	Netherlands	4410.12
5	Spain	4134
6	Germany	3877.14
7	Slovenia	2812.71
8	Denmark	2679.92
9	Switzerland	2343.83
10	Poland	2107.84
