= 2018 Istrian Spring Trophy =

- 2018 UCI Europe Tour

Race details
- Dates: 8-11 March 2018
- Stages: 4
- Distance: 480 km (298.3 mi)
- Winning time: 11h 07' 16"

Results
	Winner	Krister Hagen (NOR)	(Team Coop)
	Second	Kasper Asgreen (DEN)	(Team Virtu Cycling)
	Third	Tadej Pogačar (SLO)	(Ljubljana Gusto Xaurum)

The 2018 Istrian Spring Trophy was the 58th edition of the Istrian Spring Trophy road cycling stage race. It was part of UCI Europe Tour in category 2.2.

== Teams ==
Twenty-nine teams were invited to take part in the race. These included twenty-eight UCI Continental teams and one national team.

UCI Continental teams

- My Bike–Stevens
- Adria Mobil
- Elkov–Author
- LKT Team Brandenburg
- Team Felbermayr–Simplon Wels
- WSA–Pushbikers
- Meridiana–Kamen
- Ljubljana Gusto Xaurum
- Tirol Cycling Team
- JLT–Condor
- Development Team Sunweb
- ONE Pro Cycling
- AGO–Aqua Service
- Team Vorarlberg Santic
- Team Coop
- CK Příbram Fany Gastro
- Pannon Cycling Team
- Topforex–Lapierre
- P&S Team Thüringen
- Team Virtu Cycling
- Herrmann Radteam
- Veloclub Ratisbona
- Ked-Stevens Team Berlin
- Israel Cycling Academy U23
- KK Bled
- KK Kranj
- Meblo Jogi Pro-Concrete
- TJ Favorit Brno

National teams

- United States

== Route ==
Stage schedule
Stage	Date	Route	Distance	Type	Winner
P	8 March	Umag to Umag	2 km (1 mi)	Individual time trial	Nils Eekhoff (NED)
1	9 March	Poreč to Labin	161 km (100 mi)	Hilly stage	Kasper Asgreen (DEN)
2	10 March	Vrsar to Oprtalj	161 km (100 mi)	Hilly stage	Marc Hirschi (SUI)
3	11 March	Pazin to Umag	156 km (97 mi)	Hilly stage	Emīls Liepiņš (LAT)

== Stages ==
=== Prologue ===
8 March 2018 — Umag to Umag, 2 km (1 mi)

Result of Prologue & General classification after Prologue
Rank	Rider	Team	Time
1	Nils Eekhoff (NED)	Development Team Sunweb	2' 05"
2	Robert-Jon McCarthy (IRL)	JLT–Condor	+ 0"
3	Alexander Kamp (DEN)	Team Virtu Cycling	+ 1"
4	Filippo Fortin (ITA)	Team Felbermayr–Simplon Wels	+ 1"
5	Dušan Rajović (SRB)	Adria Mobil	+ 1"
6	Josef Černý (CZE)	Elkov–Author	+ 2"
7	Daniel Auer (AUT)	WSA–Pushbikers	+ 2"
8	Tom Wirtgen (LUX)	AGO–Aqua Service	+ 2"
9	Asbjørn Kragh Andersen (DEN)	Team Virtu Cycling	+ 2"
10	Jan Bárta (CZE)	Elkov–Author	+ 3"

=== Stage 1 ===
9 March 2018 — Poreč to Labin, 161 km (100 mi)

Result of Stage 1
Rank	Rider	Team	Time
1	Kasper Asgreen (DEN)	Team Virtu Cycling	3h 39' 51"
2	Krister Hagen (NOR)	Team Coop	+ 0"
3	Mikkel Frølich Honoré (DEN)	Team Virtu Cycling	+ 0"
4	Matej Mugerli (SLO)	My Bike–Stevens	+ 2"
5	Attila Valter (HUN)	Pannon Cycling Team	+ 4"
6	Josip Rumac (CRO)	Meridiana–Kamen	+ 4"
7	Tadej Pogačar (SLO)	Ljubljana Gusto Xaurum	+ 4"
8	Jiri Polnicky (CZE)	Elkov–Author	+ 4"
9	Rok Korošec (SLO)	My Bike–Stevens	+ 4"
10	Markus Eibegger (AUT)	Team Felbermayr–Simplon Wels	+ 4"

General classification after Stage 1
Rank	Rider	Team	Time
1	Kasper Asgreen (DEN)	Team Virtu Cycling	3h 41' 51"
2	Krister Hagen (NOR)	Team Coop	+ 2"
3	Mikkel Frølich Honoré (DEN)	Team Virtu Cycling	+ 6"
4	Rok Korošec (SLO)	My Bike–Stevens	+ 14"
5	Tadej Pogačar (SLO)	Ljubljana Gusto Xaurum	+ 15"
6	Josip Rumac (CRO)	Meridiana–Kamen	+ 16"
7	Jiri Polnicky (CZE)	Elkov–Author	+ 17"
8	Matej Mugerli (SLO)	My Bike–Stevens	+ 17"
9	Markus Eibegger (AUT)	Team Felbermayr–Simplon Wels	+ 18"
10	Attila Valter (HUN)	Pannon Cycling Team	+ 18"

=== Stage 2 ===
10 March 2018 — Vrsar to Oprtalj, 161 km (100 mi)

Result of Stage 2
Rank	Rider	Team	Time
1	Marc Hirschi (SUI)	Development Team Sunweb	3h 45' 36"
2	Tadej Pogačar (SLO)	Ljubljana Gusto Xaurum	+ 0"
3	Krister Hagen (NOR)	Team Coop	+ 1"
4	James Oram (NZL)	ONE Pro Cycling	+ 3"
5	Kasper Asgreen (DEN)	Team Virtu Cycling	+ 3"
6	Marko Pavlic (SLO)	Meblo Jogi Pro-Concrete	+ 3"
7	Sean Bennett (USA)	United States	+ 3"
8	Will Barta (USA)	United States	+ 5"
9	Stephan Rabitsch (SUI)	Team Felbermayr–Simplon Wels	+ 5"
10	Radoslav Rogina (CRO)	Adria Mobil	+ 5"

General classification after Stage 2
Rank	Rider	Team	Time
1	Krister Hagen (NOR)	Team Coop	7h 27' 26"
2	Kasper Asgreen (DEN)	Team Virtu Cycling	+ 4"
3	Tadej Pogačar (SLO)	Ljubljana Gusto Xaurum	+ 10"
4	Mikkel Frølich Honoré (DEN)	Team Virtu Cycling	+ 17"
5	Marc Hirschi (SUI)	Development Team Sunweb	+ 17"
6	Markus Eibegger (AUT)	Team Felbermayr–Simplon Wels	+ 24"
7	Radoslav Rogina (CRO)	Adria Mobil	+ 26"
8	Sean Bennett (USA)	United States	+ 27"
9	Stephan Rabitsch (SUI)	Team Felbermayr–Simplon Wels	+ 27"
10	Jiri Polnicky (CZE)	Elkov–Author	+ 28"

=== Stage 3 ===
11 March 2018 — Pazin to Umag, 156 km (97 mi)

Result of Stage 3
Rank	Rider	Team	Time
1	Emīls Liepiņš (LAT)	ONE Pro Cycling	3h 39' 50"
2	Filippo Fortin (ITA)	Team Felbermayr–Simplon Wels	+ 0"
3	Max Kanter (GER)	Development Team Sunweb	+ 0"
4	Nils Eekhoff (NED)	Development Team Sunweb	+ 0"
5	Rok Korošec (SLO)	My Bike–Stevens	+ 0"
6	Krister Hagen (NOR)	Team Coop	+ 0"
7	Daniel Auer (AUT)	WSA–Pushbikers	+ 0"
8	Tadej Pogačar (SLO)	Ljubljana Gusto Xaurum	+ 0"
9	Lionel Taminiaux (BEL)	AGO–Aqua Service	+ 0"
10	Joeri Stallaert (BEL)	Team Vorarlberg Santic	+ 0"

Final general classification
Rank	Rider	Team	Time
1	Krister Hagen (NOR)	Team Coop	7h 27' 26"
2	Kasper Asgreen (DEN)	Team Virtu Cycling	+ 4"
3	Tadej Pogačar (SLO)	Ljubljana Gusto Xaurum	+ 10"
4	Mikkel Frølich Honoré (DEN)	Team Virtu Cycling	+ 17"
5	Marc Hirschi (SUI)	Development Team Sunweb	+ 17"
6	Markus Eibegger (AUT)	Team Felbermayr–Simplon Wels	+ 24"
7	Radoslav Rogina (CRO)	Adria Mobil	+ 26"
8	Sean Bennett (USA)	United States	+ 27"
9	Stephan Rabitsch (SUI)	Team Felbermayr–Simplon Wels	+ 27"
10	Jiri Polnicky (CZE)	Elkov–Author	+ 28"

== Classification leadership table ==
In the 2018 Istrian Spring Trophy, three different jerseys were awarded for the main classifications. For the general classification, calculated by adding each cyclist's finishing times on each stage, the leader received a yellow jersey. This classification was considered the most important of the 2018 Istrian Spring Trophy, and the winner of the classification was considered the winner of the race.

Additionally, there was a points classification, which awarded a blue jersey. In the points classification, cyclists received points for finishing in the top 3 in each intermediate sprint. For winning an intermediate sprint, a rider earned 5 points, with 3 for second and 1 for third. There was also a mountains classification, the leadership of which was marked by a green jersey. In the mountains classification, points were won by reaching the top of a climb before other cyclists, with more points available for the higher-categorised climbs.

Stage	Winner	General classification	Points classification	Mountains classification	Teams classification
P	Nils Eekhoff	Nils Eekhoff	-	-	JLT–Condor
1	Kasper Asgreen	Kasper Asgreen	Žiga Horvat	Žiga Horvat	Team Virtu Cycling
2	Marc Hirschi	Krister Hagen	Lionel Taminiaux	Michael Kukrle	Team Virtu Cycling
3	Emīls Liepiņš	Krister Hagen	Lionel Taminiaux	Žiga Horvat	Team Virtu Cycling
Final		Krister Hagen	Lionel Taminiaux	Žiga Horvat	Team Virtu Cycling
