= 2018 Tour of Norway =

2018 UCI Europe Tour
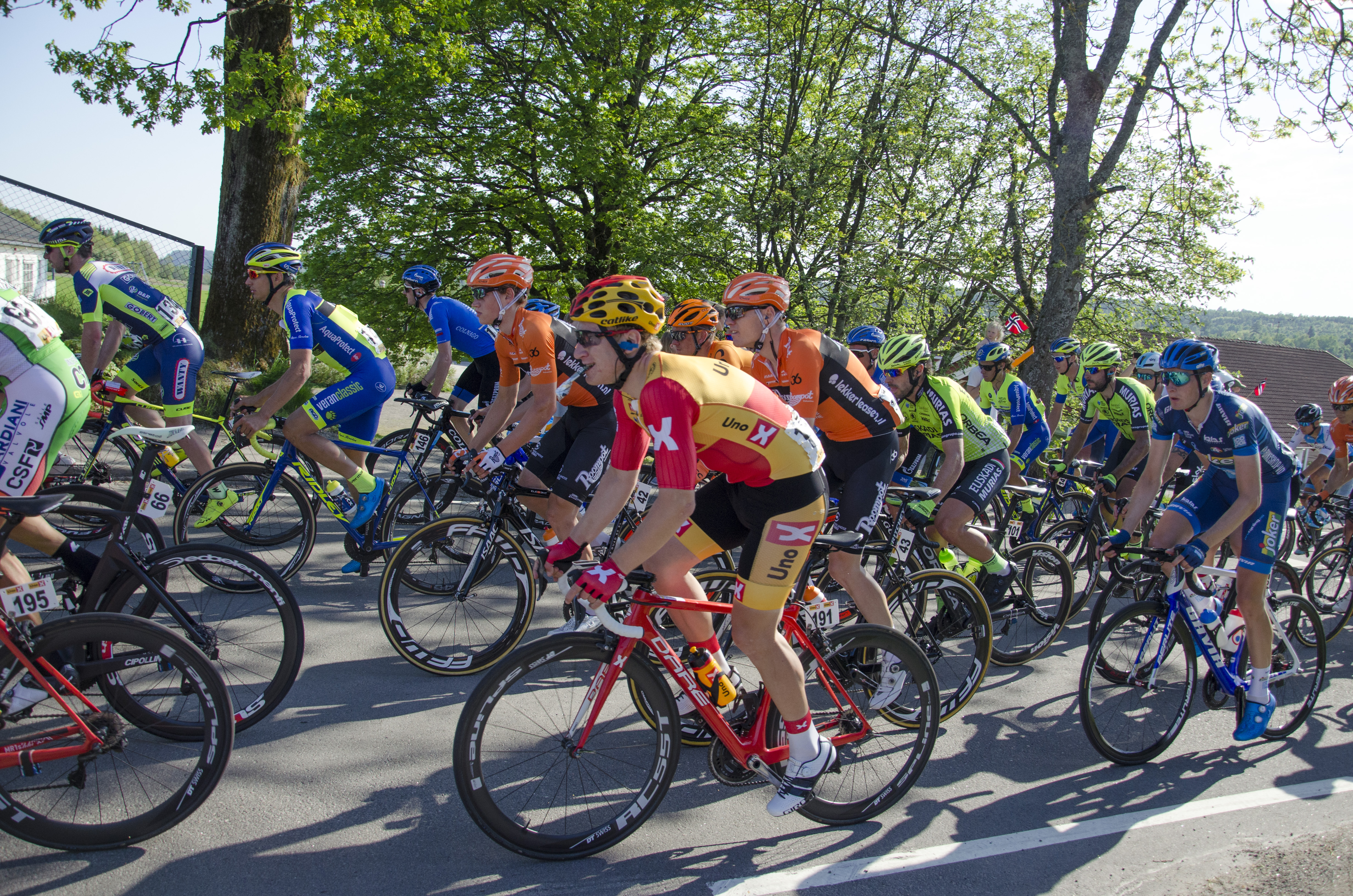

Race details
- Dates: 16–20 May 2018
- Stages: 5
- Distance: 880.6 km (547.2 mi)
- Winning time: 20h 47' 57"

Results
	Winner	Eduard Prades (ESP)	(Euskadi–Murias)
	Second	Alexander Kamp (DEN)	(Team Virtu Cycling)
	Third	Edvald Boasson Hagen (NOR)	(Team Dimension Data)
	Points	Sondre Holst Enger (NOR)	(Israel Cycling Academy)
	Mountains	Øivind Lukkedal (NOR)	(Team Coop)
	Young rider	Jesper Schultz (DEN)	(Team Virtu Cycling)
	Team	Caja Rural–Seguros RGA	

The 2018 Tour of Norway was a road cycling stage race that took place in Norway between 16 and 20 May 2018. It was the eighth edition of the Tour of Norway and was rated as a 2.HC event as part of the 2018 UCI Europe Tour. The race was won by Eduard Prades of Euskadi–Murias.

== Teams ==
20 teams participated in the race, including 3 UCI WorldTeams, 12 UCI Professional Continental teams, and 5 UCI Continental teams. Each team had a maximum of six riders:

UCI WorldTeams

- Team Dimension Data
- Team Sky
- LottoNL–Jumbo

UCI Professional Continental teams

- Bardiani–CSF
- CCC–Sprandi–Polkowice
- Euskadi–Murias
- Israel Cycling Academy
- Sport Vlaanderen–Baloise
- Aqua Blue Sport
- Caja Rural–Seguros RGA
- Delko–Marseille Provence KTM
- Gazprom–RusVelo
- Roompot–Nederlandse Loterij
- Wanty–Groupe Gobert
- WB Aqua Protect Veranclassic

UCI Continental teams

- Uno-X Norwegian Development Team
- Team Coop
- Tarteletto–Isorex
- Joker Icopal
- Team Virtu Cycling

== Route ==
Stage characteristics and winners
Stage	Date	Course	Distance	Type	Stage winner
1	16 May	Svelvik to Horten	186 km (116 mi)	Flat stage	Dylan Groenewegen (NED)
2	17 May	Hønefoss to Asker	146.6 km (91.1 mi)	Hilly stage	Edvald Boasson Hagen (NOR)
3	18 May	Moss to Sarpsborg	176 km (109 mi)	Flat stage	Dylan Groenewegen (NED)
4	19 May	Kongsvinger to Brumunddal	218 km (135 mi)	Flat stage	Dylan Groenewegen (NED)
5	20 May	Moelv to Lillehammer	154 km (96 mi)	Hilly stage	Alexander Kamp (DEN)

== Stages ==
=== Stage 1 ===
Stage 1 result

Rank	Rider	Team	Time
1	Dylan Groenewegen (NED)	LottoNL–Jumbo	4h 33' 54"
2	Sondre Holst Enger (NOR)	Israel Cycling Academy	s.t.
3	Jon Aberasturi (ESP)	Euskadi–Murias	s.t.
4	Pieter Vanspeybrouck (BEL)	Wanty–Groupe Gobert	s.t.
5	Trond Trondsen (NOR)	Team Coop	s.t.
6	Kevin Deltombe (BEL)	Sport Vlaanderen–Baloise	s.t.
7	Jeroen Meijers (NED)	Roompot–Nederlandse Loterij	s.t.
8	Alan Banaszek (POL)	CCC–Sprandi–Polkowice	s.t.
9	Evaldas Šiškevičius (LTU)	Delko–Marseille Provence KTM	s.t.
10	Kristoffer Halvorsen (NOR)	Team Sky	s.t.

General classification after Stage 1

Rank	Rider	Team	Time
1	Dylan Groenewegen (NED)	LottoNL–Jumbo	4h 33' 44"
2	Sondre Holst Enger (NOR)	Israel Cycling Academy	+ 4"
3	Erik Resell (NOR)	Uno-X Norwegian Development Team	s.t.
4	Jon Aberasturi (ESP)	Euskadi–Murias	+ 6"
5	Andreas Vangstad (NOR)	Joker Icopal	+ 7"
6	Øivind Lukkedal (NOR)	Team Coop	+ 8"
7	Audun Fløtten (NOR)	Team Virtu Cycling	+ 9"
8	Pieter Vanspeybrouck (BEL)	Wanty–Groupe Gobert	+ 10"
9	Trond Trondsen (NOR)	Team Coop	s.t.
10	Kevin Deltombe (BEL)	Sport Vlaanderen–Baloise	s.t.

=== Stage 2 ===
Stage 2 result

Rank	Rider	Team	Time
1	Edvald Boasson Hagen (NOR)	Team Dimension Data	3h 25' 32"
2	Sondre Holst Enger (NOR)	Israel Cycling Academy	s.t.
3	Alex Aranburu (ESP)	Caja Rural–Seguros RGA	s.t.
4	Justin Jules (FRA)	WB Aqua Protect Veranclassic	s.t.
5	Leonardo Basso (ITA)	Team Sky	s.t.
6	Alexander Kamp (DEN)	Team Virtu Cycling	s.t.
7	Pieter Vanspeybrouck (BEL)	Wanty–Groupe Gobert	s.t.
8	Eduard Prades (ESP)	Euskadi–Murias	s.t.
9	Timo Roosen (NED)	LottoNL–Jumbo	+ 3"
10	Trond Trondsen (NOR)	Team Coop	s.t.

General classification after Stage 2

Rank	Rider	Team	Time
1	Sondre Holst Enger (NOR)	Israel Cycling Academy	7h 59' 14"
2	Edvald Boasson Hagen (NOR)	Team Dimension Data	+ 2"
3	Dylan Groenewegen (NED)	LottoNL–Jumbo	+ 5"
4	Alex Aranburu (ESP)	Caja Rural–Seguros RGA	+ 8"
5	Erik Resell (NOR)	Uno-X Norwegian Development Team	+ 9"
6	Bjørn Tore Hoem (NOR)	Joker Icopal	+ 11"
7	Pieter Vanspeybrouck (BEL)	Wanty–Groupe Gobert	+ 12"
8	Eduard Prades (ESP)	Euskadi–Murias	s.t.
9	Alexander Kamp (DEN)	Team Virtu Cycling	s.t.
10	Andreas Vangstad (NOR)	Joker Icopal	s.t.

=== Stage 3 ===
Stage 3 result

Rank	Rider	Team	Time
1	Dylan Groenewegen (NED)	LottoNL–Jumbo	4h 09' 16"
2	Edvald Boasson Hagen (NOR)	Team Dimension Data	s.t.
3	Sondre Holst Enger (NOR)	Israel Cycling Academy	s.t.
4	Trond Trondsen (NOR)	Team Coop	s.t.
5	Pieter Vanspeybrouck (BEL)	Wanty–Groupe Gobert	s.t.
6	Jon Aberasturi (ESP)	Euskadi–Murias	s.t.
7	Michel Kreder (NED)	Aqua Blue Sport	s.t.
8	Kristoffer Halvorsen (NOR)	Team Sky	+ 4"
9	Niklas Larsen (DEN)	Team Virtu Cycling	s.t.
10	Leonardo Basso (ITA)	Team Sky	s.t.

General classification after Stage 3

Rank	Rider	Team	Time
1	Dylan Groenewegen (NED)	LottoNL–Jumbo	12h 08' 25"
2	Sondre Holst Enger (NOR)	Israel Cycling Academy	+ 1"
3	Edvald Boasson Hagen (NOR)	Team Dimension Data	s.t.
4	Pieter Vanspeybrouck (BEL)	Wanty–Groupe Gobert	+ 17"
5	Alex Aranburu (ESP)	Caja Rural–Seguros RGA	s.t.
6	Jeroen Meijers (NED)	Roompot–Nederlandse Loterij	+ 18"
7	Erik Resell (NOR)	Uno-X Norwegian Development Team	s.t.
8	Trond Trondsen (NOR)	Team Coop	+ 20"
9	Michel Kreder (NED)	Aqua Blue Sport	s.t.
10	Krister Hagen (NOR)	Team Coop	s.t.

=== Stage 4 ===
Stage 4 result

Rank	Rider	Team	Time
1	Dylan Groenewegen (NED)	LottoNL–Jumbo	5h 04' 22"
2	Alan Banaszek (POL)	CCC–Sprandi–Polkowice	s.t.
3	Kristoffer Halvorsen (NOR)	Team Sky	s.t.
4	Shane Archbold (NZL)	Aqua Blue Sport	s.t.
5	Sondre Holst Enger (NOR)	Israel Cycling Academy	s.t.
6	Justin Jules (FRA)	WB Aqua Protect Veranclassic	s.t.
7	Jordi Warlop (BEL)	Sport Vlaanderen–Baloise	s.t.
8	Jeroen Meijers (NED)	Roompot–Nederlandse Loterij	s.t.
9	Boris Vallée (BEL)	Wanty–Groupe Gobert	s.t.
10	Edvald Boasson Hagen (NOR)	Team Dimension Data	s.t.

General classification after Stage 4

Rank	Rider	Team	Time
1	Dylan Groenewegen (NED)	LottoNL–Jumbo	17h 12' 37"
2	Sondre Holst Enger (NOR)	Israel Cycling Academy	+ 11"
3	Edvald Boasson Hagen (NOR)	Team Dimension Data	s.t.
4	Alex Aranburu (ESP)	Caja Rural–Seguros RGA	+ 27"
5	Pieter Vanspeybrouck (BEL)	Wanty–Groupe Gobert	s.t.
6	Jeroen Meijers (NED)	Roompot–Nederlandse Loterij	+ 28"
7	Erik Resell (NOR)	Uno-X Norwegian Development Team	s.t.
8	Trond Trondsen (NOR)	Team Coop	+ 30"
9	Michel Kreder (NED)	Aqua Blue Sport	s.t.
10	Eduard Prades (ESP)	Euskadi–Murias	+ 31"

=== Stage 5 ===
Stage 5 result

Rank	Rider	Team	Time
1	Alexander Kamp (DEN)	Team Virtu Cycling	3h 34' 55"
2	Eduard Prades (ESP)	Euskadi–Murias	s.t.
3	Carl Fredrik Hagen (NOR)	Joker Icopal	+ 9"
4	Jeroen Meijers (NED)	Roompot–Nederlandse Loterij	+ 26"
5	Justin Jules (FRA)	WB Aqua Protect Veranclassic	s.t.
6	Ivan Rovny (RUS)	Gazprom–RusVelo	s.t.
7	Larry Warbasse (USA)	Aqua Blue Sport	s.t.
8	Alex Aranburu (ESP)	Caja Rural–Seguros RGA	s.t.
9	Jérôme Baugnies (BEL)	Wanty–Groupe Gobert	s.t.
10	Kevin Deltombe (BEL)	Sport Vlaanderen–Baloise	s.t.

== Final general classification ==
Final general classification

Rank	Rider	Team	Time
1	Eduard Prades (ESP)	Euskadi–Murias	20h 47' 57"
2	Alexander Kamp (DEN)	Team Virtu Cycling	+ 3"
3	Edvald Boasson Hagen (NOR)	Team Dimension Data	+ 12"
4	Carl Fredrik Hagen (NOR)	Joker Icopal	+ 21"
5	Alex Aranburu (ESP)	Caja Rural–Seguros RGA	+ 28"
6	Jeroen Meijers (NED)	Roompot–Nederlandse Loterij	+ 29"
7	Justin Jules (FRA)	WB Aqua Protect Veranclassic	+ 32"
8	Jonas Koch (GER)	CCC–Sprandi–Polkowice	+ 35"
9	Aritz Bagües (ESP)	Euskadi–Murias	s.t.
10	Ivan Rovny (RUS)	Gazprom–RusVelo	s.t.
