= 2015 Tour des Fjords =

2015 UCI Europe Tour

Race details
- Dates: 27–31 May
- Stages: 5
- Distance: 901.7 km (560.3 mi)
- Winning time: 22h 18' 47"

Results
Jersey awarded to the overall winner	Winner	Marco Haller (AUT)	(Team Katusha)
	Second	Søren Kragh Andersen (DEN)	(Team TreFor–Blue Water)
	Third	Michael Olsson (SWE)	(Team TreFor–Blue Water)
Jersey awarded to the points classification winner	Points	Alexander Kristoff (NOR)	(Team Katusha)
Jersey awarded to the mountains classification winner	Mountains	Amets Txurruka (ESP)	(Caja Rural–Seguros RGA)
Jersey awarded to the young rider classification winner	Young rider	Marco Haller (AUT)	(Team Katusha)
	Team	Caja Rural–Seguros RGA	

The 2015 Tour des Fjords was the eighth edition of the Tour des Fjords cycle stage race. It was a part of the 2015 UCI Europe Tour as a 2.1 event. The race was won by Austrian rider Marco Haller, riding for Team Katusha.

== Schedule ==
The race was held over five stages.

Stage	Date	Course	Distance	Type	Winner	Ref
1	27 May	Bergen to Norheimsund	174.3 km (108.3 mi)	Flat stage	Alexander Kristoff (NOR)	
2	28 May	Jondal to Haugesund	215 km (133.6 mi)	Hilly stage	Alexander Kristoff (NOR)	
3	29 May	Stord to Sauda	164.1 km (102.0 mi)	Flat stage	Alexander Kristoff (NOR)	
4	30 May	Stavanger to Sandnes	166.8 km (103.6 mi)	Hilly stage	Søren Kragh Andersen (DEN)	
5	31 May	Hinna to Stavanger	181.5 km (112.8 mi)	Flat stage	Edvald Boasson Hagen (NOR)	
Total		901.7 km (560.3 mi)				

== Teams ==
21 teams were selected to take place in the 2015 Tour des Fjords. Four of these were UCI WorldTeams, six were UCI Professional Continental teams, and eleven were UCI Continental teams.

UCI WorldTeams

- Team Katusha
- Tinkoff–Saxo
- Orica–GreenEDGE
- Trek Factory Racing

UCI Professional Continental teams

- MTN–Qhubeka
- Topsport Vlaanderen–Baloise
- Wanty–Groupe Gobert
- Caja Rural–Seguros RGA
- Team Roompot
- Cult Energy Pro Cycling

Continental teams

- Team Joker
- Cyclingteam de Rijke
- Madison Genesis
- Rabobank Development Team
- Team Ringeriks–Kraft
- Team Sparebanken Sør
- Team FixIT.no
- ActiveJet
- Team Tre Berg–Bianchi
- Team TreFor–Blue Water
- Team Coop–Øster Hus

== Stages ==
=== Stage 1 ===
27 May 2015 — Bergen to Norheimsund, 174.3 km (108.3 mi)

Stage 1 result
Rank	Rider	Team	Time
1	Alexander Kristoff (NOR)	Team Katusha	4h 31' 55"
2	Marco Haller (AUT)	Team Katusha	+ 0"
3	Daryl Impey (RSA)	Orica–GreenEDGE	+ 0"
4	Kristian Sbaragli (ITA)	MTN–Qhubeka	+ 0"
5	Michael Valgren (DEN)	Tinkoff–Saxo	+ 0"
6	Søren Kragh Andersen (DEN)	Team TreFor–Blue Water	+ 0"
7	Marco Marcato (ITA)	Wanty–Groupe Gobert	+ 0"
8	Carlos Barbero (ESP)	Caja Rural–Seguros RGA	+ 0"
9	Rasmus Guldhammer (DEN)	Cult Energy Pro Cycling	+ 0"
10	Asbjørn Kragh Andersen (DEN)	Team TreFor–Blue Water	+ 0"

General classification after stage 1
Rank	Rider	Team	Time
1	Alexander Kristoff (NOR)	Team Katusha	4h 31' 45"
2	Marco Haller (AUT)	Team Katusha	+ 4"
3	Daryl Impey (RSA)	Orica–GreenEDGE	+ 6"
4	Kristian Sbaragli (ITA)	MTN–Qhubeka	+ 10"
5	Michael Valgren (DEN)	Tinkoff–Saxo	+ 10"
6	Søren Kragh Andersen (DEN)	Team TreFor–Blue Water	+ 10"
7	Marco Marcato (ITA)	Wanty–Groupe Gobert	+ 10"
8	Carlos Barbero (ESP)	Caja Rural–Seguros RGA	+ 10"
9	Rasmus Guldhammer (DEN)	Cult Energy Pro Cycling	+ 10"
10	Asbjørn Kragh Andersen (DEN)	Team TreFor–Blue Water	+ 10"

=== Stage 2 ===
28 May 2015 — Jondal to Haugesund, 215 km (133.6 mi)

Stage 2 result
Rank	Rider	Team	Time
1	Alexander Kristoff (NOR)	Team Katusha	5h 42' 11"
2	Jasper Stuyven (BEL)	Trek Factory Racing	+ 0"
3	Asbjørn Kragh Andersen (DEN)	Team TreFor–Blue Water	+ 0"
4	Edvald Boasson Hagen (NOR)	MTN–Qhubeka	+ 0"
5	André Looij (NED)	Team Roompot	+ 0"
6	Kristian Sbaragli (ITA)	MTN–Qhubeka	+ 0"
7	Michael Valgren (DEN)	Tinkoff–Saxo	+ 0"
8	Fridtjof Røinås (NOR)	Team Sparebanken Sør	+ 0"
9	Carlos Barbero (ESP)	Caja Rural–Seguros RGA	+ 0"
10	Oscar Landa (NOR)	Team Coop–Øster Hus	+ 0"

General classification after stage 2
Rank	Rider	Team	Time
1	Alexander Kristoff (NOR)	Team Katusha	10h 13' 46"
2	Jasper Stuyven (BEL)	Trek Factory Racing	+ 14"
3	Marco Haller (AUT)	Team Katusha	+ 14"
4	Asbjørn Kragh Andersen (DEN)	Team TreFor–Blue Water	+ 16"
5	Daryl Impey (RSA)	Orica–GreenEDGE	+ 16"
6	Kristian Sbaragli (ITA)	MTN–Qhubeka	+ 20"
7	Michael Valgren (DEN)	Tinkoff–Saxo	+ 20"
8	Edvald Boasson Hagen (NOR)	MTN–Qhubeka	+ 20"
9	Carlos Barbero (ESP)	Caja Rural–Seguros RGA	+ 20"
10	Mads Pedersen (DEN)	Cult Energy Pro Cycling	+ 20"

=== Stage 3 ===
29 May 2015 — Stord to Sauda, 164.1 km (102.0 mi)

Stage 3 result
Rank	Rider	Team	Time
1	Alexander Kristoff (NOR)	Team Katusha	3h 57' 05"
2	Daryl Impey (RSA)	Orica–GreenEDGE	+ 0"
3	Edvald Boasson Hagen (NOR)	MTN–Qhubeka	+ 0"
4	Asbjørn Kragh Andersen (DEN)	Team TreFor–Blue Water	+ 0"
5	Jasper Stuyven (BEL)	Trek Factory Racing	+ 0"
6	Mads Pedersen (DEN)	Cult Energy Pro Cycling	+ 0"
7	Alexander Wetterhall (SWE)	Team Tre Berg–Bianchi	+ 0"
8	Nikolay Trusov (RUS)	Tinkoff–Saxo	+ 0"
9	Kristian Sbaragli (ITA)	MTN–Qhubeka	+ 0"
10	Eduard Prades (ESP)	Caja Rural–Seguros RGA	+ 0"

General classification after stage 3
Rank	Rider	Team	Time
1	Alexander Kristoff (NOR)	Team Katusha	14h 10' 41"
2	Daryl Impey (RSA)	Orica–GreenEDGE	+ 20"
3	Jasper Stuyven (BEL)	Trek Factory Racing	+ 24"
4	Michael Valgren (DEN)	Tinkoff–Saxo	+ 24"
5	Marco Haller (AUT)	Team Katusha	+ 24"
6	Asbjørn Kragh Andersen (DEN)	Team TreFor–Blue Water	+ 26"
7	Edvald Boasson Hagen (NOR)	MTN–Qhubeka	+ 26"
8	Kristian Sbaragli (ITA)	MTN–Qhubeka	+ 30"
9	Mads Pedersen (DEN)	Cult Energy Pro Cycling	+ 30"
10	Marco Marcato (ITA)	Wanty–Groupe Gobert	+ 30"

=== Stage 4 ===
30 May 2015 — Stavanger to Sandnes, 166.8 km (103.6 mi)

Stage 4 result
Rank	Rider	Team	Time
1	Søren Kragh Andersen (DEN)	Team TreFor–Blue Water	4h 03' 27"
2	Amets Txurruka (ESP)	Caja Rural–Seguros RGA	+ 1"
3	Michael Olsson (SWE)	Team TreFor–Blue Water	+ 4"
4	Rasmus Guldhammer (DEN)	Cult Energy Pro Cycling	+ 4"
5	Marco Haller (AUT)	Team Katusha	+ 4"
6	Chris Anker Sørensen (DEN)	Tinkoff–Saxo	+ 7"
7	Mads Pedersen (DEN)	Cult Energy Pro Cycling	+ 23"
8	Kristian Sbaragli (ITA)	MTN–Qhubeka	+ 35"
9	Ángel Madrazo (ESP)	Caja Rural–Seguros RGA	+ 35"
10	August Jensen (NOR)	Team Coop–Øster Hus	+ 35"

General classification after stage 4
Rank	Rider	Team	Time
1	Søren Kragh Andersen (DEN)	Team TreFor–Blue Water	18h 14' 28"
2	Marco Haller (AUT)	Team Katusha	+ 8"
3	Michael Olsson (SWE)	Team TreFor–Blue Water	+ 10"
4	Rasmus Guldhammer (DEN)	Cult Energy Pro Cycling	+ 14"
5	Amets Txurruka (ESP)	Caja Rural–Seguros RGA	+ 25"
6	Mads Pedersen (DEN)	Cult Energy Pro Cycling	+ 33"
7	Alexander Kristoff (NOR)	Team Katusha	+ 40"
8	Kristian Sbaragli (ITA)	MTN–Qhubeka	+ 45"
9	Ángel Madrazo (ESP)	Caja Rural–Seguros RGA	+ 45"
10	Daryl Impey (RSA)	Orica–GreenEDGE	+ 48"

=== Stage 5 ===
31 May 2015 — Hinna to Stavanger, 181.5 km (112.8 mi)

Stage 5 result
Rank	Rider	Team	Time
1	Edvald Boasson Hagen (NOR)	MTN–Qhubeka	4h 04' 18"
2	Daryl Impey (RSA)	Orica–GreenEDGE	+ 0"
3	Marco Haller (AUT)	Team Katusha	+ 0"
4	Sven Erik Bystrøm (NOR)	Tinkoff–Saxo	+ 6"
5	Jasper Stuyven (BEL)	Trek Factory Racing	+ 15"
6	Kristian Sbaragli (ITA)	MTN–Qhubeka	+ 15"
7	Mads Pedersen (DEN)	Cult Energy Pro Cycling	+ 15"
8	Marco Marcato (ITA)	Wanty–Groupe Gobert	+ 15"
9	Daniel Hoelgaard (NOR)	Team Joker	+ 15"
10	Rasmus Guldhammer (DEN)	Cult Energy Pro Cycling	+ 15"

Final general classification
Rank	Rider	Team	Time
1	Marco Haller (AUT)	Team Katusha	22h 18' 47"
2	Søren Kragh Andersen (DEN)	Team TreFor–Blue Water	+ 12"
3	Michael Olsson (SWE)	Team TreFor–Blue Water	+ 24"
4	Rasmus Guldhammer (DEN)	Cult Energy Pro Cycling	+ 28"
5	Amets Txurruka (ESP)	Caja Rural–Seguros RGA	+ 39"
6	Daryl Impey (RSA)	Orica–GreenEDGE	+ 41"
7	Edvald Boasson Hagen (NOR)	MTN–Qhubeka	+ 46"
8	Mads Pedersen (DEN)	Cult Energy Pro Cycling	+ 47"
9	Alexander Kristoff (NOR)	Team Katusha	+ 53"
10	Kristian Sbaragli (ITA)	MTN–Qhubeka	+ 59"

== Classification leadership table ==
In the 2015 Tour des Fjords, four different jerseys were awarded. For the general classification, calculated by adding each cyclist's finishing times on each stage, and allowing time bonuses (10, 6 and 4 seconds respectively) for the first three finishers on mass-start stages, the leader received a gold jersey. Additionally, there was a points classification, awarding a dark blue jersey, and a mountains classification, the leadership of which was marked by a polka dot jersey. The fourth jersey represented the young rider classification, marked by a white jersey. This was decided in the same way as the general classification, but only young riders were eligible. There was also a classification for teams.

Stage	Winner	General classification	Points classification	Mountains classification	Young rider classification	Team classification
1	Alexander Kristoff	Alexander Kristoff	Alexander Kristoff	Ronan van Zandbeek	Marco Haller	Team Katusha
2	Alexander Kristoff	Alexander Kristoff	Alexander Kristoff	Ronan van Zandbeek	Jasper Stuyven	Team Katusha
3	Alexander Kristoff	Alexander Kristoff	Alexander Kristoff	Ronan van Zandbeek	Jasper Stuyven	Team TreFor–Blue Water
4	Søren Kragh Andersen	Søren Kragh Andersen	Alexander Kristoff	Amets Txurruka	Søren Kragh Andersen	Caja Rural–Seguros RGA
5	Edvald Boasson Hagen	Marco Haller	Alexander Kristoff	Amets Txurruka	Marco Haller	Caja Rural–Seguros RGA
Final		Marco Haller	Alexander Kristoff	Amets Txurruka	Marco Haller	Caja Rural–Seguros RGA

== Final standings ==
=== General classification ===
Final general classification
Rank	Rider	Team	Time
1	Marco Haller (AUT)	Team Katusha	22h 18' 47"
2	Søren Kragh Andersen (DEN)	Team TreFor–Blue Water	+ 12"
3	Michael Olsson (SWE)	Team TreFor–Blue Water	+ 24"
4	Rasmus Guldhammer (DEN)	Cult Energy Pro Cycling	+ 28"
5	Amets Txurruka (ESP)	Caja Rural–Seguros RGA	+ 39"
6	Daryl Impey (RSA)	Orica–GreenEDGE	+ 41"
7	Edvald Boasson Hagen (NOR)	MTN–Qhubeka	+ 46"
8	Mads Pedersen (DEN)	Cult Energy Pro Cycling	+ 47"
9	Alexander Kristoff (NOR)	Team Katusha	+ 53"
10	Kristian Sbaragli (ITA)	MTN–Qhubeka	+ 59"

=== Points classification ===
Final points classification
Rank	Rider	Team	Points
1	Alexander Kristoff (NOR)	Team Katusha	62
2	Daryl Impey (RSA)	Orica–GreenEDGE	52
3	Edvald Boasson Hagen (NOR)	MTN–Qhubeka	46
4	Marco Haller (AUT)	Team Katusha	46
5	Jasper Stuyven (BEL)	Trek Factory Racing	38
6	Kristian Sbaragli (ITA)	MTN–Qhubeka	34
7	Søren Kragh Andersen (DEN)	Team TreFor–Blue Water	32
8	Michael Valgren (DEN)	Tinkoff–Saxo	32
9	Asbjørn Kragh Andersen (DEN)	Team TreFor–Blue Water	27
10	Mads Pedersen (DEN)	Cult Energy Pro Cycling	20

=== Mountains classification ===
Final mountains classification
Rank	Rider	Team	Points
1	Amets Txurruka (ESP)	Caja Rural–Seguros RGA	23
2	Etienne van Empel (NED)	Team Roompot	13
3	Ole André Austevoll (NOR)	Team FixIT.no	10
4	Jérôme Baugnies (BEL)	Wanty–Groupe Gobert	7
5	Michael Valgren (DEN)	Tinkoff–Saxo	5
6	Adrian Gjølberg (NOR)	Team FixIT.no	5
7	Antwan Tolhoek (NED)	Rabobank Development Team	5
8	Andreas Erland (NOR)	Team Sparebanken Sør	5
9	Michał Podlaski (POL)	ActiveJet	5
10	Søren Kragh Andersen (DEN)	Team TreFor–Blue Water	4

=== Young rider classification ===
Final young rider classification
Rank	Rider	Team	Time
1	Marco Haller (AUT)	Team Katusha	22h 18' 47"
2	Søren Kragh Andersen (DEN)	Team TreFor–Blue Water	+ 12"
3	Mads Pedersen (DEN)	Cult Energy Pro Cycling	+ 47"
4	August Jensen (NOR)	Team Coop–Øster Hus	+ 1' 13"
5	Michael Valgren (DEN)	Tinkoff–Saxo	+ 1' 16"
6	Sam Oomen (NED)	Rabobank Development Team	+ 1' 24"
7	Jasper Stuyven (BEL)	Trek Factory Racing	+ 1' 25"
8	Carl Fredrik Hagen (NOR)	Team Sparebanken Sør	+ 1' 46"
9	Asbjørn Kragh Andersen (DEN)	Team TreFor–Blue Water	+ 1' 59"
10	Fredrik Strand Galta (NOR)	Team Coop–Øster Hus	+ 2' 00"

=== Teams classification ===
Final teams classification
Rank	Team	Time
1	Caja Rural–Seguros RGA	66h 59' 09"
2	Team TreFor–Blue Water	+ 7"
3	Wanty–Groupe Gobert	+ 1' 21"
4	Tinkoff–Saxo	+ 1' 52"
5	Team Katusha	+ 2' 51"
6	Rabobank Development Team	+ 3' 40"
7	Orica–GreenEDGE	+ 4' 38"
8	Trek Factory Racing	+ 5' 28"
9	MTN–Qhubeka	+ 10' 07"
10	Team Roompot	+ 10' 11"
