= 2018 Poreč Trophy =

- 2018 UCI Europe Tour

Race details
- Dates: 3 March 2018
- Stages: 1
- Distance: 156 km (96.93 mi)
- Winning time: 3h 23' 33"

Results
	Winner	Emīls Liepiņš (LAT)	(ONE Pro Cycling)
	Second	Asbjørn Kragh Andersen (DEN)	(Team Virtu Cycling)
	Third	Dušan Rajović (SRB)	(Adria Mobil)

The 2018 Poreč Trophy was the 19th edition of the Poreč Trophy road cycling one day race. It was part of UCI Europe Tour in category 1.2.

== Teams ==
Thirty teams were invited to take part in the race. All of them were UCI Continental or club teams.

UCI Continental teams

- My Bike–Stevens
- Meridiana–Kamen
- Adria Mobil
- Ljubljana Gusto Xaurum
- ONE Pro Cycling
- CK Příbram Fany Gastro
- Team Coop
- Pannon Cycling Team
- Tirol Cycling Team
- JLT–Condor
- Elkov–Author
- Team Felbermayr–Simplon Wels
- Development Team Sunweb
- LKT Team Brandenburg
- WSA–Pushbikers
- AGO–Aqua Service
- Team Vorarlberg Santic
- Topforex–Lapierre
- IAM-Excelsior
- Veloclub Ratisbona
- Herrmann Radteam
- KK Kranj
- TJ Favorit Brno
- P&S Team Thüringen
- Ked-Stevens Team Berlin
- KK Bled
- Cycling Team Graz ARBÖ
- Israel Cycling Academy U23
- Meblo Jogi Pro-Concrete
- Team Virtu Cycling

== Result ==
Result
Rank	Rider	Team	Time
1	Emīls Liepiņš (LAT)	ONE Pro Cycling	3h 23' 33"
2	Asbjørn Kragh Andersen (DEN)	Team Virtu Cycling	+ 0"
3	Dušan Rajović (SRB)	Adria Mobil	+ 0"
4	Tadej Pogačar (SLO)	Ljubljana Gusto Xaurum	+ 0"
5	Gašper Katrašnik (SLO)	Adria Mobil	+ 0"
6	Krister Hagen (NOR)	Team Coop	+ 0"
7	Joeri Stallaert (BEL)	Team Vorarlberg Santic	+ 0"
8	Gian Friesecke (SUI)	Team Vorarlberg Santic	+ 0"
9	Tom Stewart (GBR)	JLT–Condor	+ 0"
10	Filippo Fortin (ITA)	Team Felbermayr–Simplon Wels	+ 0"
