= 2018 La Drôme Classic =

- 2018 UCI Europe Tour

Race details
- Dates: 25 February 2018
- Stages: 1
- Distance: 206 km (128.0 mi)
- Winning time: 5h 16' 25"

Results
	Winner	Lilian Calmejane (FRA)	(Direct Énergie)
	Second	Jhonatan Narváez (COL)	(Quick-Step Floors)
	Third	Bob Jungels (LUX)	(Quick-Step Floors)

The 2018 Royal Bernard Drome Classic was the fifth edition of La Drôme Classic road cycling one day race. It was part of UCI Europe Tour in category 1.1.

== Teams ==
Twenty-two teams were invited to take part in the race. These included five UCI World Tour teams, thirteen UCI Professional Continental teams, three UCI Continental teams and one national team.

UCI WorldTeams

- AG2R La Mondiale
- Trek–Segafredo
- Quick-Step Floors
- Astana
- Groupama–FDJ

UCI Professional Continental teams

- Delko–Marseille Provence KTM
- Direct Énergie
- Fortuneo–Samsic
- Cofidis
- Vital Concept
- Aqua Blue Sport
- Androni Giocattoli–Sidermec
- WB Aqua Protect Veranclassic
- Roompot–Nederlandse Loterij
- Nippo–Vini Fantini–Europa Ovini
- Bardiani–CSF
- Wanty–Groupe Gobert
- Rally Cycling

UCI Continental teams

- Roubaix–Lille Métropole
- St. Michel–Auber93
- Team Waoo

National team

- France

== General classification ==
Result
Rank	Rider	Team	Time
1	Lilian Calmejane (FRA)	Direct Énergie	5h 16' 25"
2	Jhonatan Narváez (COL)	Quick-Step Floors	+ 2"
3	Bob Jungels (LUX)	Quick-Step Floors	+ 11"
4	Samuel Dumoulin (FRA)	AG2R La Mondiale	+ 1'06"
5	Arthur Vichot (FRA)	Groupama–FDJ	+ 1'10"
6	Jonathan Hivert (FRA)	Direct Énergie	+ 1'10"
7	Andrea Pasqualon (ITA)	Wanty–Groupe Gobert	+ 1'10"
8	Romain Bardet (FRA)	AG2R La Mondiale	+ 1'10"
9	Pieter Serry (BEL)	Quick-Step Floors	+ 1'10"
10	Larry Warbasse (USA)	Aqua Blue Sport	+ 1'10"
