= Michael Olsson =

Swedish cyclist

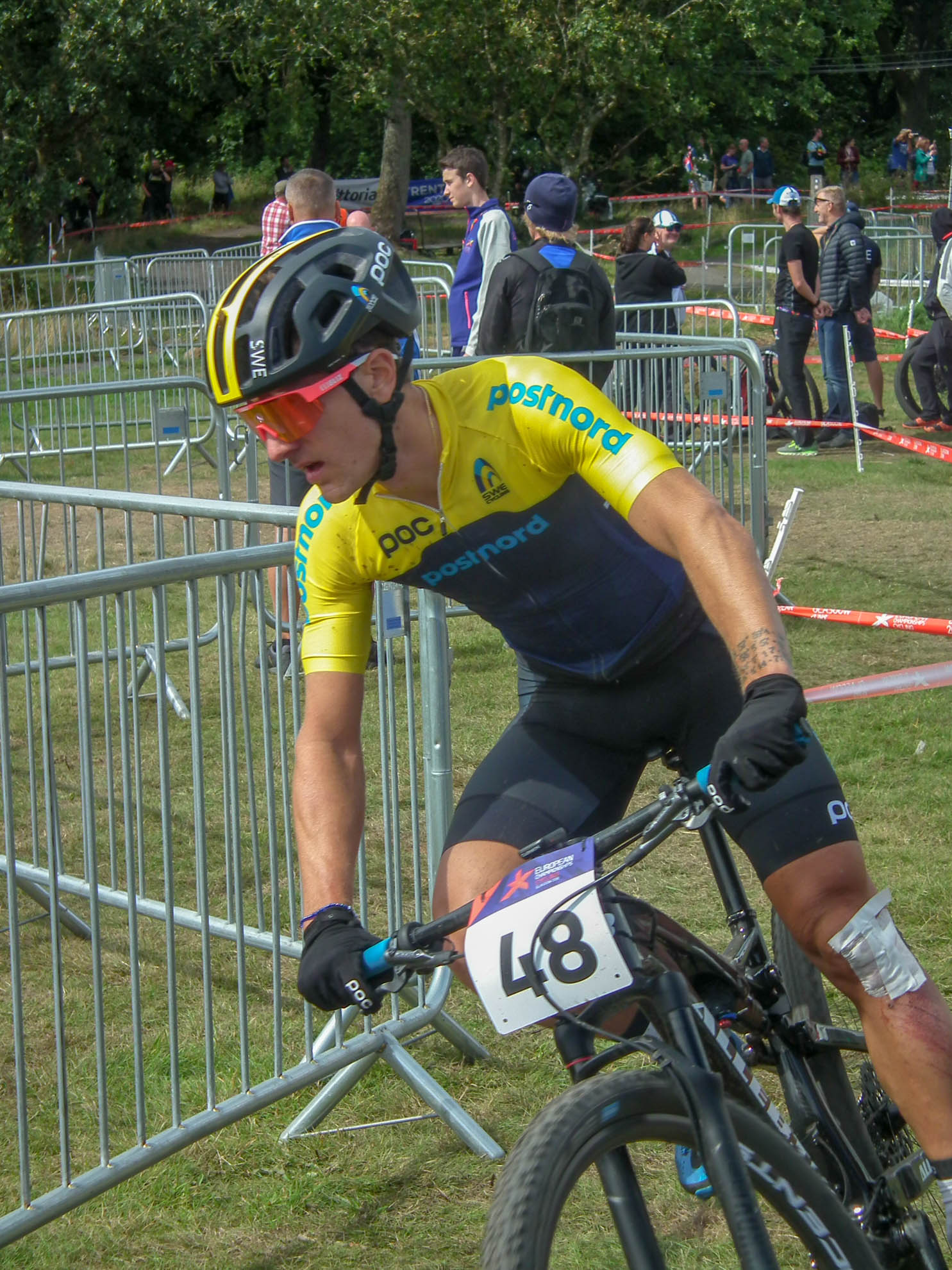
- Olsson in 2018

Personal information
- Full name: Michael Einar Olsson
- Born: 4 March 1986 (age 40) Gothenburg, Sweden

Cycling career
- Sport: Cycling
- Current team: CK Sundet
- Disciplines: Road; Mountain biking
- Role: Rider

Amateur teams
- 2010: PA Lightning
- 2016–: CK Sundet

Professional teams
- 2011–2012: CykelCity
- 2013: Team People4you–Unaas Cycling
- 2013: Argos–Shimano (stagiaire)
- 2014: Team Ringeriks–Kraft
- 2015: Team TreFor–Blue Water

Michael Einar Olsson (born 4 March 1986) is a Swedish cyclist.

== Major results ==
2010
2nd Univest Grand Prix
3rd Road race, National Road Championships
2011
4th Scandinavian Race Uppsala
7th GP Herning
2012
1st Stage 1 (ITT) Tour de Normandie
2nd Scandinavian Race Uppsala
6th Tartu GP
2013
1st Road race, National Road Championships
2nd Ringerike GP
4th Scandinavian Race Uppsala
7th Hadeland GP
9th Overall Tour de Normandie
2014
1st Road race, National Road Championships
3rd Hadeland GP
6th Ringerike GP
7th Overall Istrian Spring Trophy
8th Overall Sibiu Cycling Tour
8th Skive–Løbet
2015
3rd Overall Tour des Fjords
5th Overall Flèche du Sud
7th Philadelphia International Cycling Classic
8th GP Viborg
8th Ringerike GP
9th Hadeland GP
