= 2018 Trofej Umag =

- 2018 UCI Europe Tour

Race details
- Dates: 28 February 2018
- Stages: 1
- Distance: 144.4 km (89.73 mi)
- Winning time: 3h 29' 49"

Results
	Winner	Krister Hagen (NOR)	(Team Coop)
	Second	Tom Baylis (GBR)	(ONE Pro Cycling)
	Third	Dušan Rajović (SRB)	(Adria Mobil)

The 2018 Trofej Umag was the 6th edition of the Trofej Umag road cycling one day race. It was part of UCI Europe Tour in category 1.2.

== Teams ==
Thirty teams were invited to take part in the race. All of them were UCI Continental teams.

UCI Continental teams

- My Bike–Stevens
- Adria Mobil
- LKT Team Brandenburg
- Team Felbermayr–Simplon Wels
- Tirol Cycling Team
- Elkov–Author
- AGO–Aqua Service
- WSA–Pushbikers
- Meridiana–Kamen
- Ljubljana Gusto Xaurum
- Hrinkow Advarics Cycleang
- Team Vorarlberg Santic
- Team Coop
- JLT–Condor
- ONE Pro Cycling
- Pannon Cycling Team
- CK Příbram Fany Gastro
- Development Team Sunweb
- Topforex–Lapierre
- KK Kranj
- Cycling Team Graz ARBÖ
- IAM Excelsior
- Ked-Stevens Team Berlin
- P&S Team Thüringen
- Veloclub Ratisbona
- Israel Cycling Academy U23
- Herrmann Radteam
- KK Bled
- TJ Favorit Brno
- Team Virtu Cycling

== Result ==
Result
Rank	Rider	Team	Time
1	Krister Hagen (NOR)	Team Coop	3h 29' 49"
2	Tom Baylis (GBR)	ONE Pro Cycling	+ 19"
3	Dušan Rajović (SRB)	Adria Mobil	+ 27"
4	Jonas Bokeloh (GER)	LKT Team Brandenburg	+ 27"
5	Asbjørn Kragh Andersen (DEN)	Team Virtu Cycling	+ 27"
6	Max Kanter (GER)	Development Team Sunweb	+ 27"
7	Daniel Auer (AUT)	WSA–Pushbikers	+ 27"
8	Joab Schneitner (SUI)	IAM Excelsior	+ 27"
9	Josip Rumac (CRO)	Meridiana–Kamen	+ 27"
10	Timon Loderer (GER)	Hrinkow Advarics Cycleang	+ 27"
