= Marco Haller (cyclist) =

Austrian road bicycle racer

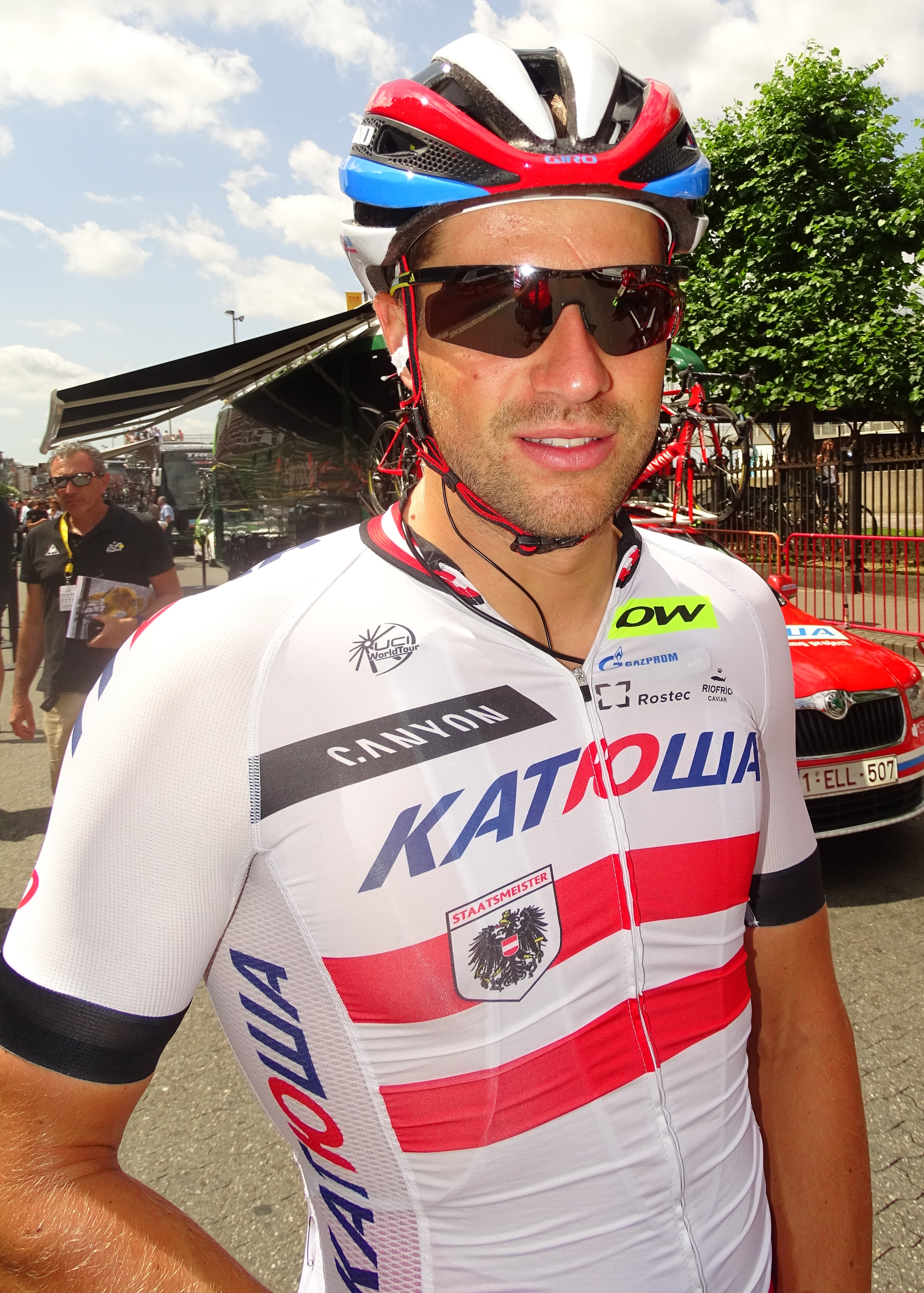
- Haller, wearing the Austrian national road race champion's jersey at the 2015 Tour de France

Personal information
- Full name: Marco Haller
- Born: 1 April 1991 (age 35) St. Veit an der Glan, Austria
- Height: 1.78 m (5 ft 10 in)
- Weight: 72 kg (159 lb)

Cycling career
- Sport: Cycling
- Current team: Tudor Pro Cycling Team
- Discipline: Road
- Role: Rider
- Rider type: Sprinter; One-day races

Amateur teams
- 2004–2005: RC ÖAMTC Tappler Grafenstein
- 2006–2009: RLM Kostel's Radshop Grafenstein

Professional teams
- 2010: Tyrol–Team Radland Tirol
- 2011: Adria Mobil
- 2012–2019: Team Katusha
- 2020–2021: Bahrain–McLaren
- 2022–2024: Bora–Hansgrohe
- 2025–: Tudor Pro Cycling Team

Major wins
- One-day races and Classics National Road Race Championship (2015) Hamburg Cyclassics (2022)

Marco Haller (born 1 April 1991) is an Austrian professional road bicycling racer, who rides for UCI ProTeam Tudor Pro Cycling Team. A sprinter, Haller has taken six victories during his professional career, including wins at the 2015 Austrian National Road Race Championships and the 2022 Hamburg Cyclassics.

== Career ==
=== Early career ===
Born in St. Veit an der Glan, Haller took four stage victories at the 2009 Tour de l'Abitibi, a junior race in Canada, and he also won a bronze medal in the road race at the UCI Junior World Championships in Moscow. He rode for UCI Continental team Tyrol–Team Radland Tirol in 2010, before moving to Adria Mobil the following year. During his season with Adria Mobil, Haller took a second-place finish at the Poreč Trophy, and recorded a fifth-place finish in the final sprint of the under-23 road race at the UCI Road World Championships in Denmark.

=== Team Katusha (2012–2019) ===
==== 2012–2014 ====
Following his high placing in Denmark, Haller moved up to UCI World Tour level for the 2012 season, joining Team Katusha. He took his first win with the team later that year, at the Tour of Beijing, in a mass sprint where he had the upper hand on established sprinters such as Alessandro Petacchi (Lampre–ISD) and Elia Viviani (Liquigas–Cannondale). The following year, Haller won the mountains classification at the Three Days of De Panne, and placed seventh in the general classification at both the Tour des Fjords and the Arctic Race of Norway. In 2014, Haller won the final stage of his home tour, the Tour of Austria in Vienna.

==== 2015 ====
Haller finished in third place in the Gran Premio Nobili Rubinetterie, before he won the general classification at the Tour des Fjords. He finished second on the opening stage, having led out teammate Alexander Kristoff for the stage win in Norheimsund. Haller was part of the lead-out when Kristoff took further wins on the following two stages, before Haller moved into overall contention with a fifth-place stage finish on stage four. On the final stage, Haller was one of a quartet of riders that went clear of the field inside the final 10 kilometres (6.2 miles), and with a 15-second gap at the finish, Haller won the race by 12 seconds. The following month, he won the Austrian National Road Race Championships for the first time in his career, resulting in him wearing the national champion's jersey at his first Tour de France start. During the race, he got into the breakaway on stage 16 and was caught by the bunch before the last climb of the day together with Adam Hansen.

==== 2016–2019 ====
Haller took no further wins over the next three years, his closest such result was a second-place finish on the final stage of the 2018 Dubai Tour, being outsprinted by Elia Viviani. With Haller starting his 2019 season in Australia, he contested the Bay Classic Series criterium races in early January, winning the opening race on New Year's Day, on his way to winning the series overall. He rode the Giro d'Italia for the first time in his career, where he was involved in an incident following stage 12, when a fan attempted to take a bidon out of his mouth; Haller angrily confronted the fan, who apologised for his actions. Haller took no further top-five placings during the season, with his best result being seventh at the Scheldeprijs.

=== Bahrain–McLaren (2020–2021) ===
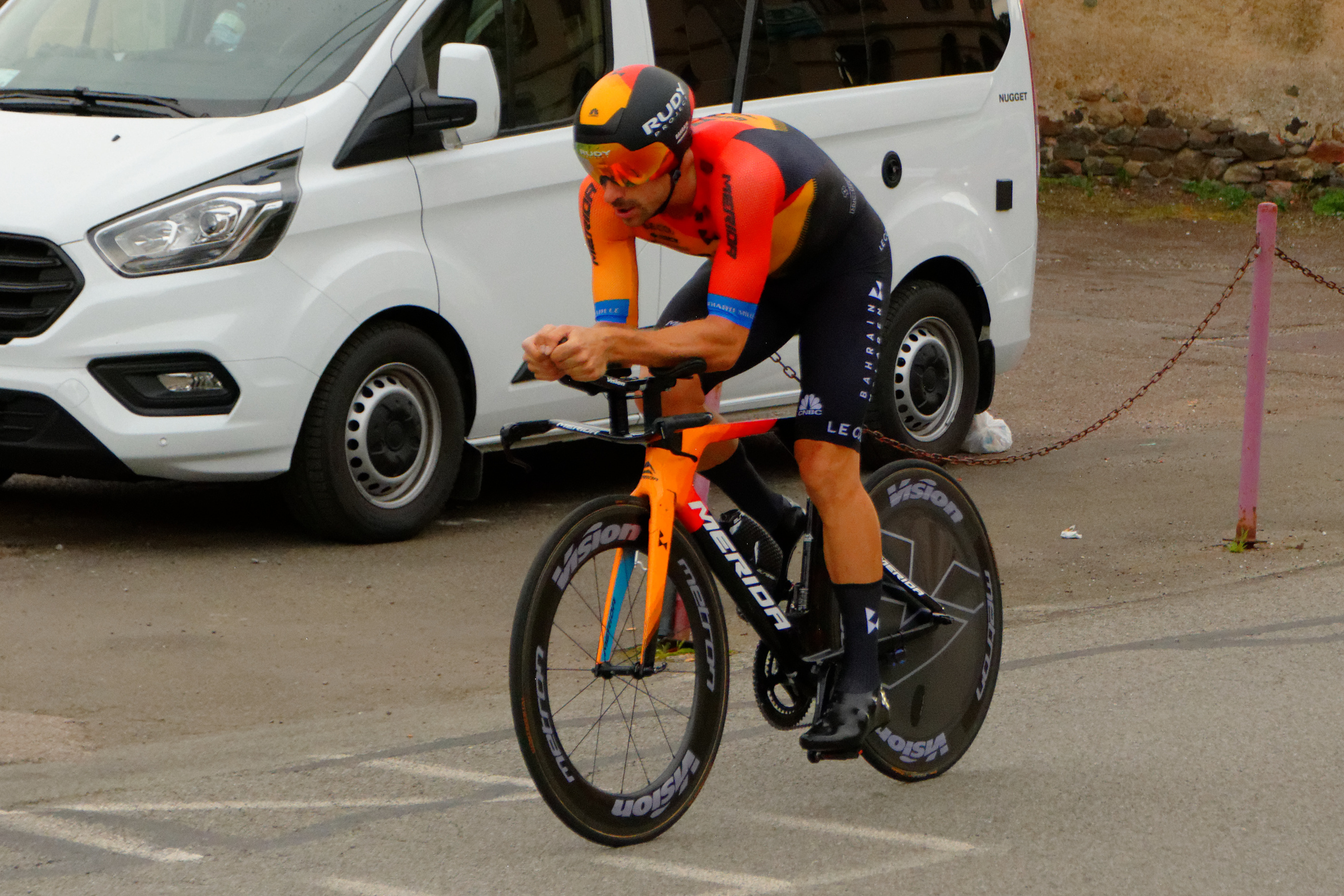
Haller at the 2020 Tour de France

After eight seasons riding for Team Katusha–Alpecin, and with the team having been taken over by Israel Start-Up Nation due to financial issues, Haller joined Bahrain–Merida – later renamed Bahrain–McLaren – for the 2020 season. Like 2019, he started his season in Australia, recording a best of result of eighth place at the Cadel Evans Great Ocean Road Race, prior to the COVID-19 pandemic-induced suspension of racing. The following year, Haller finished second to Patrick Konrad at the Austrian National Road Race Championships, and he placed sixth overall at the Deutschland Tour.

=== Bora–Hansgrohe (2022–present) ===
Haller left Team Bahrain Victorious after two seasons, signing a deal in August 2021 with Bora–Hansgrohe for the 2022 season. He took his first victory with the team at that year's Tour of Norway, winning the fourth stage of the race in a bunch sprint in Kristiansand. Later in the year, Haller took victory in the Hamburg Cyclassics; he was part of a quintet that got clear inside the final 20 kilometres (12 miles), and with support from teammate Patrick Konrad, Haller outsprinted Wout van Aert and Quinten Hermans to the finish line.

No podium finishes followed in 2023 and the early part of 2024, although Haller did record a sixth-place finish at the Paris Olympics in the road race – the best such result for a male Austrian rider – having been a part of the lead group in the second half of the race and missed out on a bronze medal (won by Christophe Laporte) in the final sprint.

== Major results ==
2008
1st Stage 3 Po Stajerski
2009
1st Stage 1 Course de la Paix Juniors
Tour de l'Abitibi

1st Stages 1, 4, 5 & 6

3rd Road race, UCI Junior World Championships
4th Road race, UEC European Junior Road Championships
2011
2nd Poreč Trophy
5th Road race, UCI Under-23 Road World Championships
2012 (1 pro win)
1st Stage 4 Tour of Beijing
2013
1st Mountains classification, Three Days of De Panne
7th Overall Tour des Fjords

1st Stage 3 (TTT)

7th Overall Arctic Race of Norway
10th Le Samyn
2014 (1)
1st Stage 8 Tour of Austria
2nd Road race, National Under-23 Road Championships
2015 (2)
1st Road race, National Road Championships
1st Overall Tour des Fjords

1st Young rider classification

3rd Gran Premio Nobili Rubinetterie
2016
4th Road race, National Road Championships
10th Grand Prix Impanis-Van Petegem
2018
10th Scheldeprijs
2019
1st Overall Bay Classic Series

1st Sprints classification
1st Stage 1

7th Scheldeprijs
9th Eschborn–Frankfurt
2020
8th Cadel Evans Great Ocean Road Race
2021
2nd Road race, National Road Championships
6th Overall Deutschland Tour
10th E3 Saxo Bank Classic
2022 (2)
1st Hamburg Cyclassics
1st Stage 4 Tour of Norway
5th Road race, National Road Championships
2024
6th Road race, Olympic Games
2025
4th Road race, National Road Championships
9th Overall Deutschland Tour

=== Grand Tour general classification results timeline ===
Grand Tour	2015	2016	2017	2018	2019	2020	2021	2022	2023	2024
Giro d'Italia	—	—	—	—	116	—	—	—	—	—
Tour de France	126	162	155	—	148	143	127	86	78	85
Vuelta a España	—	—	118	—	—	—	—	—	—	

Legend
—	Did not compete
DNF	Did not finish
