= 2018 GP Miguel Induráin =

Race details
- Dates: 31 March 2018
- Stages: 1
- Distance: 186 km (115.6 mi)
- Winning time: 4h 41' 18"

Results
	Winner	Alejandro Valverde (ESP)	(Movistar Team)
	Second	Carlos Verona (ESP)	(Mitchelton–Scott)
	Third	Nicholas Schultz (AUS)	(Caja Rural–Seguros RGA)

The 2018 GP Miguel Induráin was the 65th edition of the GP Miguel Induráin cycle race and was held on 31 March 2018. The race started and finished in Estella. The race was won by Alejandro Valverde.

== Teams ==
Seventeen teams were invited to take part in the race. These included three UCI WorldTeams, seven UCI Professional Continental teams, and seven UCI Continental teams.

UCI WorldTeams

- Team Katusha–Alpecin
- Movistar Team
- Mitchelton–Scott

UCI Professional Continental Teams

- Burgos BH
- Caja Rural–Seguros RGA
- Delko–Marseille Provence KTM
- Direct Énergie
- Euskadi–Murias
- Rally Cycling
- Team Novo Nordisk

UCI Continental Teams

- Fundación Euskadi
- Inteja Dominican Cycling Team
- Interpro Stradalli
- Polartec–Kometa
- Rádio Popular–Boavista
- W52 / FC Porto
- Lokosphinx

== Results ==
Result

Rank	Rider	Team	Time
1	Alejandro Valverde (ESP)	Movistar Team	4h 41' 18"
2	Carlos Verona (ESP)	Mitchelton–Scott	+ 20"
3	Nicholas Schultz (AUS)	Caja Rural–Seguros RGA	+ 1' 04"
4	Eduard Prades (ESP)	Euskadi–Murias	+ 1' 16"
5	Carlos Betancur (COL)	Movistar Team	+ 1' 16"
6	Marc Soler (ESP)	Movistar Team	+ 1' 19"
7	Ilnur Zakarin (RUS)	Team Katusha–Alpecin	+ 1' 30"
8	Lilian Calmejane (FRA)	Direct Énergie	+ 1' 43"
9	Simon Špilak (SLO)	Team Katusha–Alpecin	+ 1' 43"
10	Dmitry Strakhov (RUS)	Lokosphinx	+ 2' 03"
