= Lionel Taminiaux =

Belgian cyclist

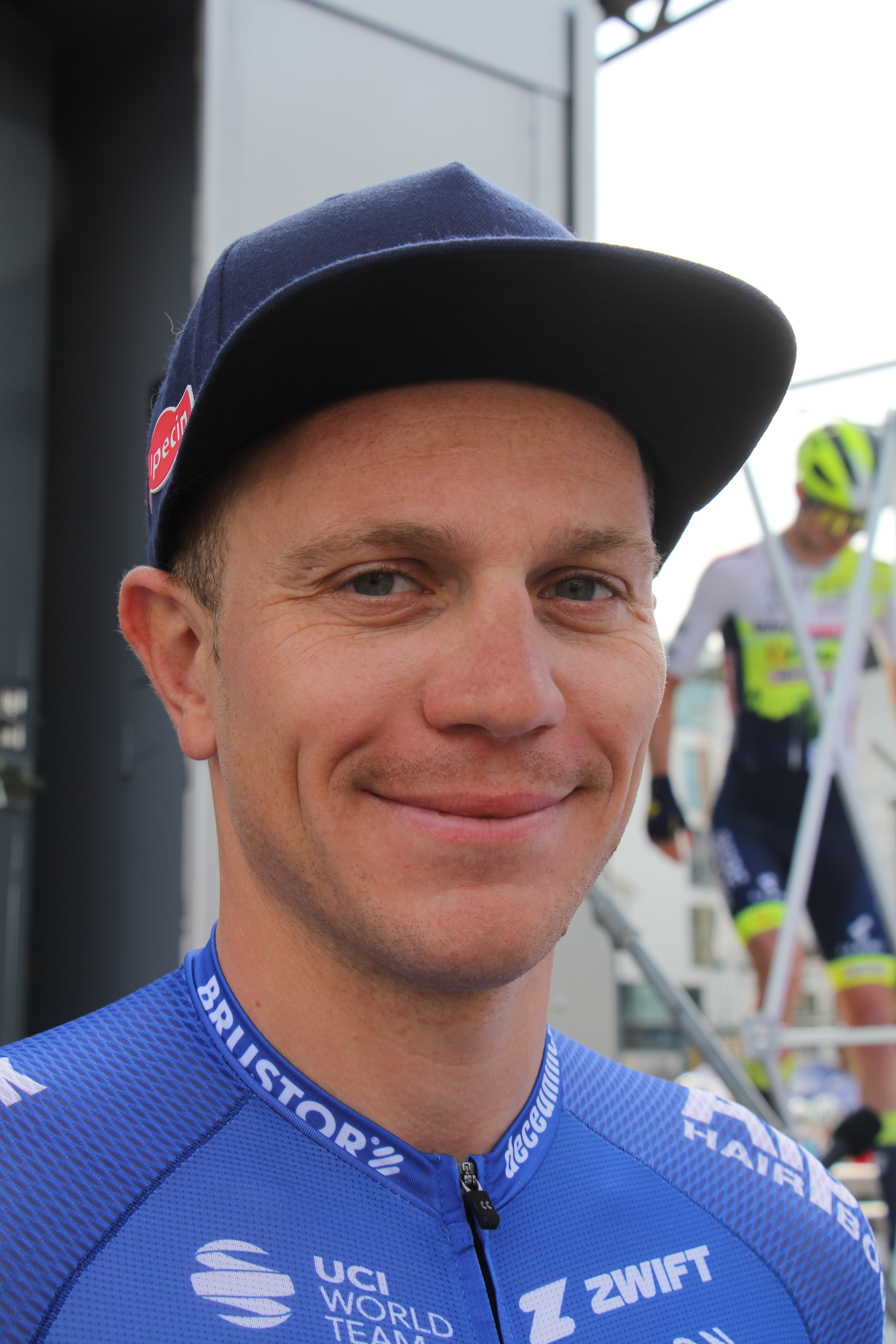
- Taminiaux in 2023

Personal information
- Full name: Lionel Taminiaux
- Born: 21 May 1996 (age 30) Ottignies-Louvain-la-Neuve, Belgium
- Height: 1.73 m (5 ft 8 in)
- Weight: 72 kg (159 lb)

Cycling career
- Sport: Cycling
- Current team: Lotto–Intermarché
- Discipline: Road
- Role: Rider
- Rider type: Rouleur; Sprinter

Amateur teams
- 2017: WB Veranclassic Aqua Protect (stagiaire)
- 2018: WB Aqua Protect Veranclassic (stagiaire)

Professional teams
- 2015–2018: Color Code–Aquality Protect
- 2019–2020: Wallonie Bruxelles
- 2021–2023: Alpecin–Fenix
- 2024–: Lotto–Dstny

Lionel Taminiaux (born 21 May 1996) is a Belgian cyclist, who currently rides for UCI WorldTeam Lotto–Intermarché.

== Major results ==
2014
2nd Kuurne–Brussels–Kuurne Juniors
9th Overall Keizer der Juniores
2017
3rd Grand Prix Criquielion
2018
1st Grand Prix Criquielion
1st Points classification, Istrian Spring Trophy
8th Omloop Het Nieuwsblad Beloften
9th Internationale Wielertrofee Jong Maar Moedig
9th Paris–Roubaix Espoirs
2019 (1 pro win)
1st La Roue Tourangelle
1st Mountains classification, Four Days of Dunkirk
3rd Rund um Köln
6th Halle–Ingooigem
7th Route Adélie
8th Dwars door het Hageland
9th Grand Prix Pino Cerami
2021
3rd Binche–Chimay–Binche
8th Gooikse Pijl
2022 (2)
1st Stage 4 Four Days of Dunkirk
1st Stage 5 Tour de Langkawi
7th Grote Prijs Marcel Kint
8th Veenendaal–Veenendaal Classic
8th Circuit de Wallonie
2023
1st Schaal Sels
2nd Omloop Mandel-Leie-Schelde
2nd Circuit de Wallonie
3rd Egmont Cycling Race
4th Bredene Koksijde Classic
7th Druivenkoers Overijse
7th Ronde van Limburg
7th Visit Friesland Elfsteden Race
2024 (1)
1st Stage 1 Tour of Guangxi
4th Kampioenschap van Vlaanderen
4th Rund um Köln
4th Elfstedenrace
8th Kuurne–Brussels–Kuurne
8th Brussels Cycling Classic
8th Heistse Pijl
8th Gooikse Pijl
9th Dwars door het Hageland
2026 (1)
1st Stage 4 ZLM Tour
3rd Binche–Chimay–Binche
5th Hong Kong Cyclothon

=== Grand Tour general classification results timeline ===
Grand Tour	2022
Giro d'Italia	—
Tour de France	—
Vuelta a España	127
