= Eduard Prades =

Spanish bicycle racer (born 1987)

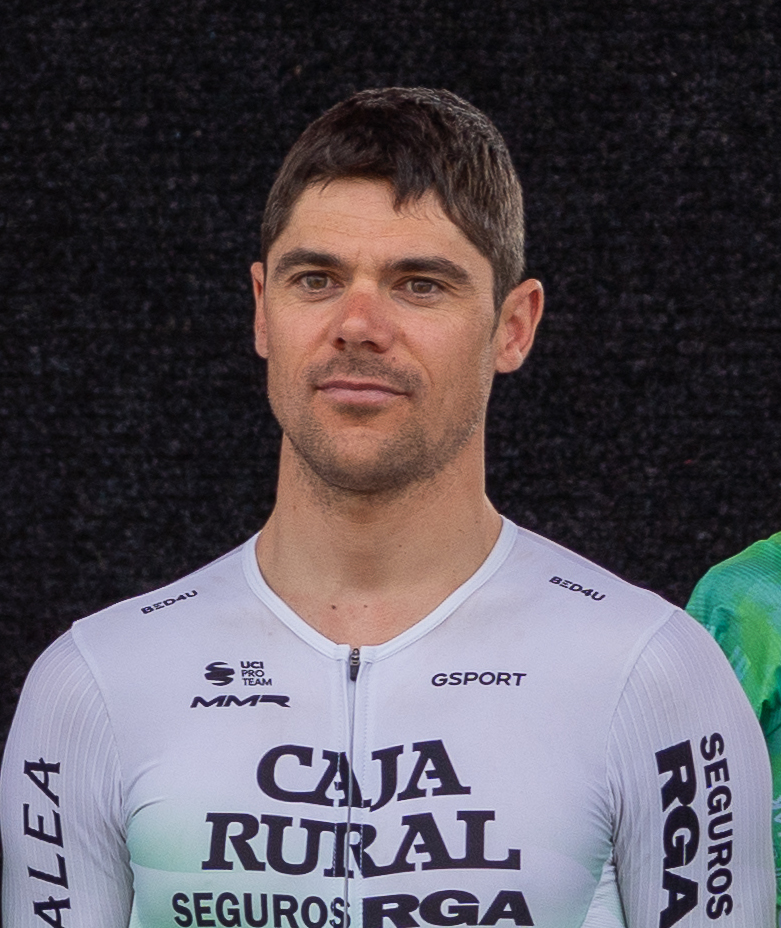
- Prades at the 2024 Tour of the Basque Country

Personal information
- Full name: Eduard Prades Reverte
- Born: 9 August 1987 (age 39) Tarragona, Catalonia
- Height: 1.78 m (5 ft 10 in)
- Weight: 63 kg (139 lb)

Cycling career
- Sport: Cycling
- Current team: Caja Rural–Seguros RGA
- Discipline: Road
- Role: Rider
- Rider type: Puncheur

Amateur teams
- 2007–2008: ECP–Spiuk
- 2010: Azysa–Cetya–Conor
- 2011–2012: Mopesa

Professional teams
- 2009: Andorra–Grandvalira
- 2013–2014: OFM–Quinta da Lixa
- 2014: Matrix Powertag
- 2015–2017: Caja Rural–Seguros RGA
- 2018: Euskadi–Murias
- 2019–2020: Movistar Team
- 2021: Delko
- 2022–: Caja Rural–Seguros RGA

Major wins
- Stage races Tour of Turkey (2018) Tour of Norway (2018)

Eduard Prades Reverte (born 9 August 1987 in Tarragona) is a Catalan cyclist, who currently rides for UCI ProTeam Caja Rural–Seguros RGA. He was named in the startlist for the 2016 Vuelta a España.

== Major results ==
2010
1st GP Macario
2nd Aiztondo Klasica
2011
1st Aiztondo Klasica
1st Prueba Santa Cruz
1st Stage 3 Cinturó de l'Empordà
2nd Trofeo Eusebio Vélez
3rd Copa de España
2012
1st Copa de España
1st Memorial Valenciaga
1st Prueba Santa Cruz
2013
1st Overall Troféu Joaquim Agostinho

1st Stage 3

7th Klasika Primavera
2014
1st Stage 1 GP Abimota
1st Minamiuonuma Road-Japan Pro Tour
2nd Overall Volta ao Alentejo

1st Stage 2

4th Klasika Primavera
7th Overall Volta ao Algarve
7th Overall Tour de Hokkaido
8th Overall Tour de Ijen
2015
1st Coppa Sabatini
1st Stage 8 Volta a Portugal
1st Mountains classification, Vuelta a la Comunidad de Madrid
5th Giro dell'Emilia
6th Overall Tour de Beauce
6th Gran Premio Bruno Beghelli
10th Memorial Marco Pantani
2016
1st Philadelphia International Cycling Classic
1st Stage 1 Volta Internacional Cova da Beira
2017
5th Coppa Sabatini
9th Klasika Primavera
9th Coppa Bernocchi
10th Overall Giro della Toscana
2018
1st Overall Tour of Turkey
1st Overall Tour of Norway
2nd Overall Tour de Yorkshire
3rd Overall Vuelta a Castilla y León
4th Overall Tour de Luxembourg
4th GP Miguel Induráin
6th Trofeo Lloseta–Andratx
9th Overall Tour du Limousin
2019
1st Overall Vuelta a Aragón
3rd Klasika Primavera
8th Overall Tour de la Provence

1st Stage 2

9th Overall Vuelta a la Comunidad de Madrid
9th GP Industria & Artigianato di Larciano
10th Overall Vuelta a Castilla y León
10th Bretagne Classic
2020
3rd Circuito de Getxo
2021
2nd Tour de Vendée
6th Overall Arctic Race of Norway
2023
6th Circuito de Getxo
7th Prueba Villafranca de Ordizia
2024
1st Overall Volta ao Alentejo

1st Stage 4

5th Clássica da Arrábida
6th Tour du Finistère
8th Grand Prix La Marseillaise
9th Circuit Franco-Belge
2025
4th Grand Prix La Marseillaise
5th Brabantse Pijl
5th Circuito de Getxo
5th Vuelta a Castilla y León
7th Ronde van Limburg
2026
5th Brabantse Pijl
8th Circuit Franco-Belge

=== Grand Tour general classification results timeline ===
Grand Tour	2016	2017	2018
Giro d'Italia	—	—	—
Tour de France	—	—	—
Vuelta a España	127	—	68

Legend
—	Did not compete
DNF	Did not finish
