= Erik Resell =

Norwegian cyclist

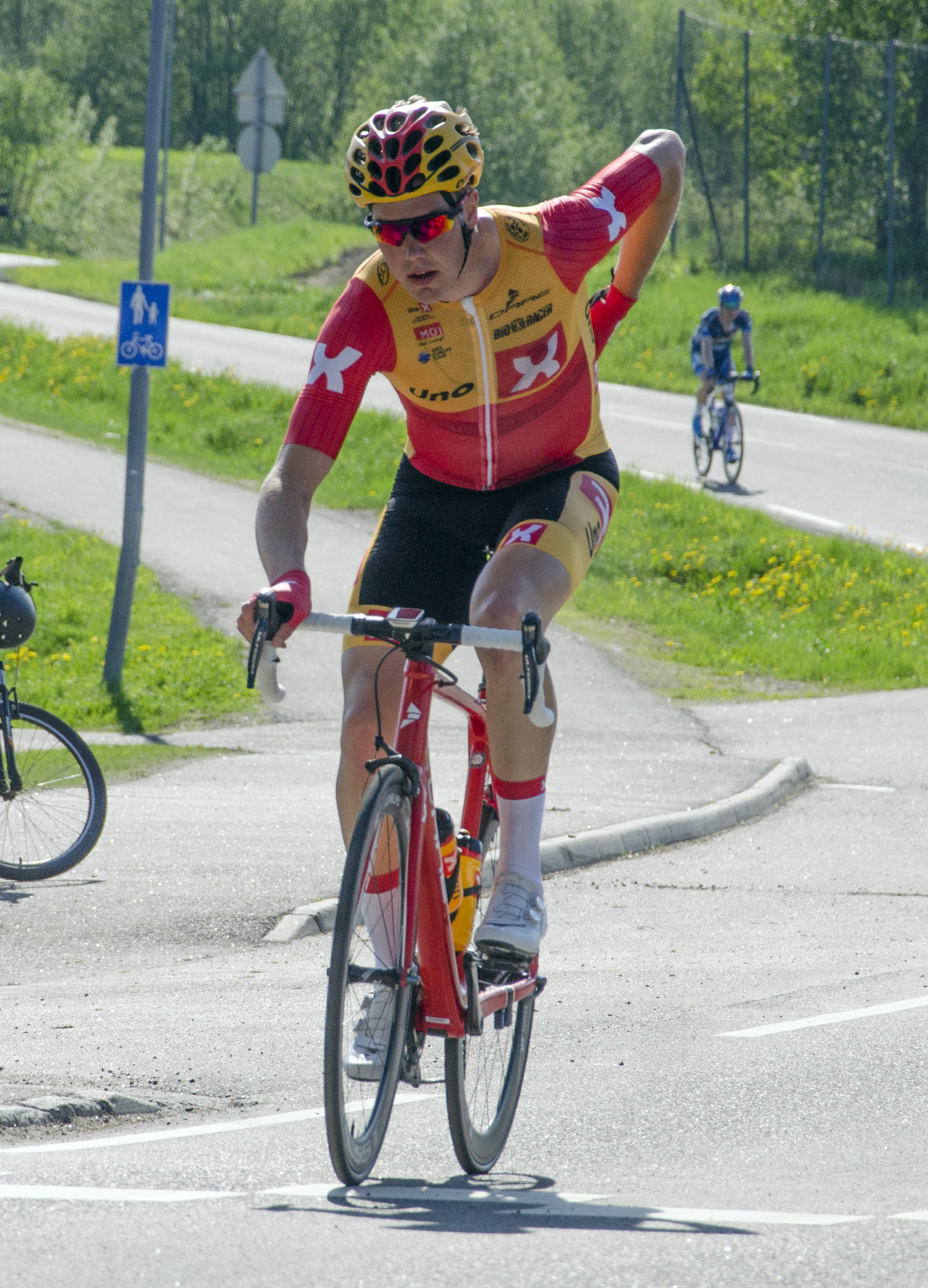

Personal information
- Full name: Erik Nordsæter Resell
- Born: 28 September 1996 (age 30) Trondheim, Norway

Cycling career
- Sport: Cycling
- Current team: Uno-X Mobility
- Disciplines: Road; Cyclo-cross
- Role: Rider

Professional team
- 2017–: Uno-X Hydrogen Development Team

Erik Nordsæter Resell (born 28 September 1996) is a Norwegian racing cyclist, who currently rides for UCI ProTeam Uno-X Mobility. He competed in the men's team time trial event at the 2017 UCI Road World Championships.

== Major results ==
2016
1st National CX Championships
2018
1st Omloop Het Nieuwsblad Beloften
2nd Paris–Tours Espoirs
4th Gylne Gutuer
8th Ruota d'Oro
2019
9th Ringerike GP
9th Gylne Gutuer
10th Himmerland Rundt
2021
5th Road race, National Road Championships
10th Kuurne–Brussels–Kuurne
