= Asbjørn Kragh Andersen =

Danish cyclist (born 1992)

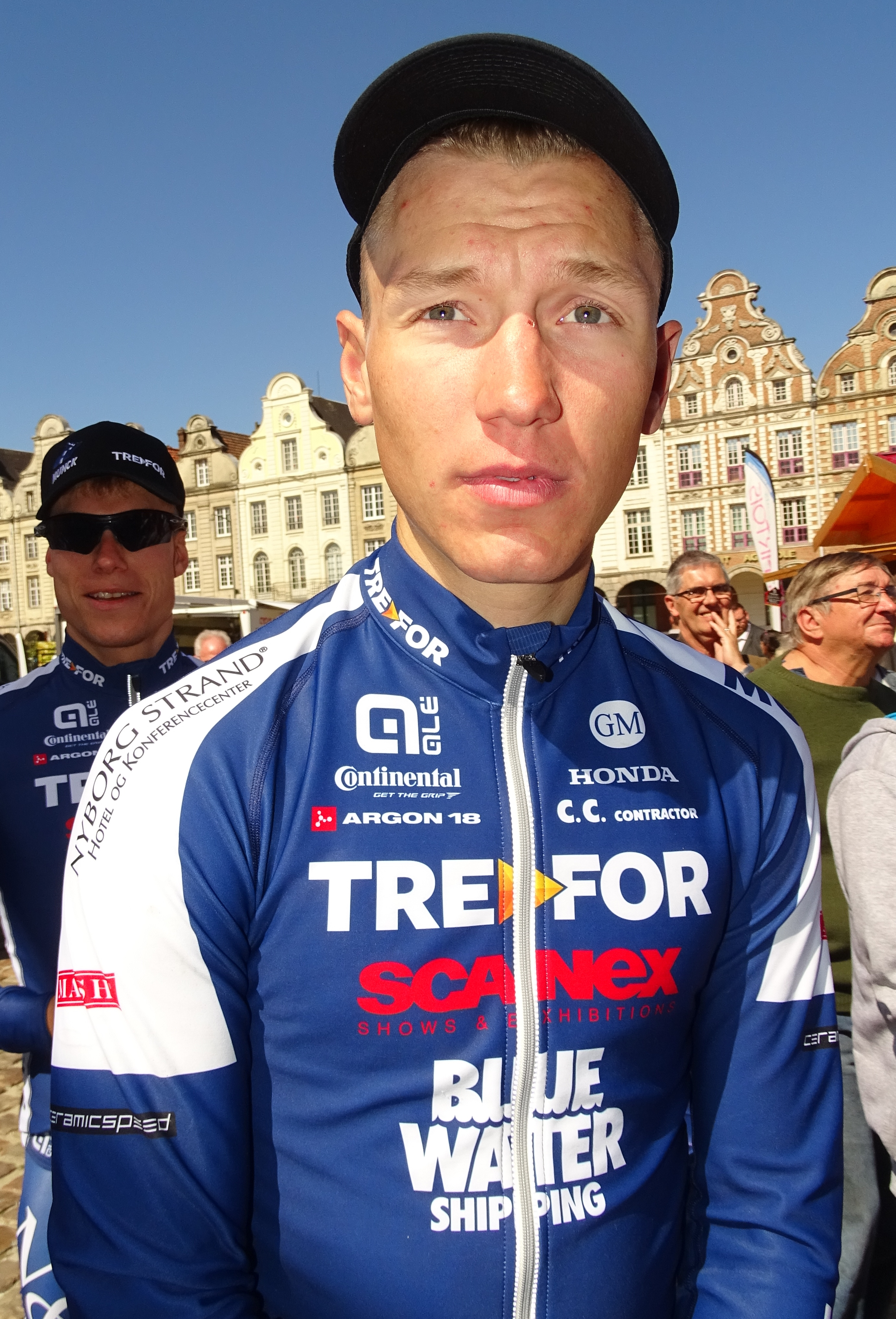
- Kragh Andersen at the 2015 Paris–Arras Tour.

Personal information
- Full name: Asbjørn Kragh Andersen
- Born: 9 April 1992 (age 34) Fredericia, Denmark
- Height: 1.82 m (6 ft 0 in)
- Weight: 72 kg (159 lb)

Cycling career
- Sport: Cycling
- Current team: Retired
- Discipline: Road
- Role: Rider

Professional teams
- 2012–2013: Team TreFor
- 2014: Christina Watches–Dana
- 2015: Team TreFor–Blue Water
- 2016–2017: Delko–Marseille Provence KTM
- 2018: Team Virtu Cycling
- 2019–2022: Team Sunweb

Asbjørn Kragh Andersen (born 9 April 1992) is a Danish former cyclist, who competed as a professional from 2012 to 2022. He is the older brother of Søren Kragh Andersen, who is also a professional cyclist.

== Major results ==
2010
6th Overall Trofeo Karlsberg
2012
10th Neuseen Classics
2013
1st Stage 2 Course de la Paix U23
5th Hadeland GP
7th Skive–Løbet
2014
1st Stage 2 Szlakiem Grodów Piastowskich
4th Overall Grand Prix Cycliste de Saguenay

1st Young rider classification

4th Overall Tour de Beauce
5th Time trial, National Road Championships
5th Rund um Köln
6th Skive–Løbet
2015
1st Ringerike GP
1st Stage 5 Tour du Loir-et-Cher
1st Stage 5 Flèche du Sud
1st Stage 3 Paris–Arras Tour
2nd Himmerland Rundt
3rd GP Horsens
5th Fyen Rundt
2016
1st Stage 4 Tour des Fjords
2017
7th Gran Premio della Costa Etruschi
9th Overall Danmark Rundt
2018
1st Overall Tour du Loir-et-Cher

1st Points classification

2nd Poreč Trophy
5th Trofej Umag
7th Veenendaal–Veenendaal Classic
2020
5th Road race, National Road Championships
