= Krister Hagen =

Norwegian cyclist

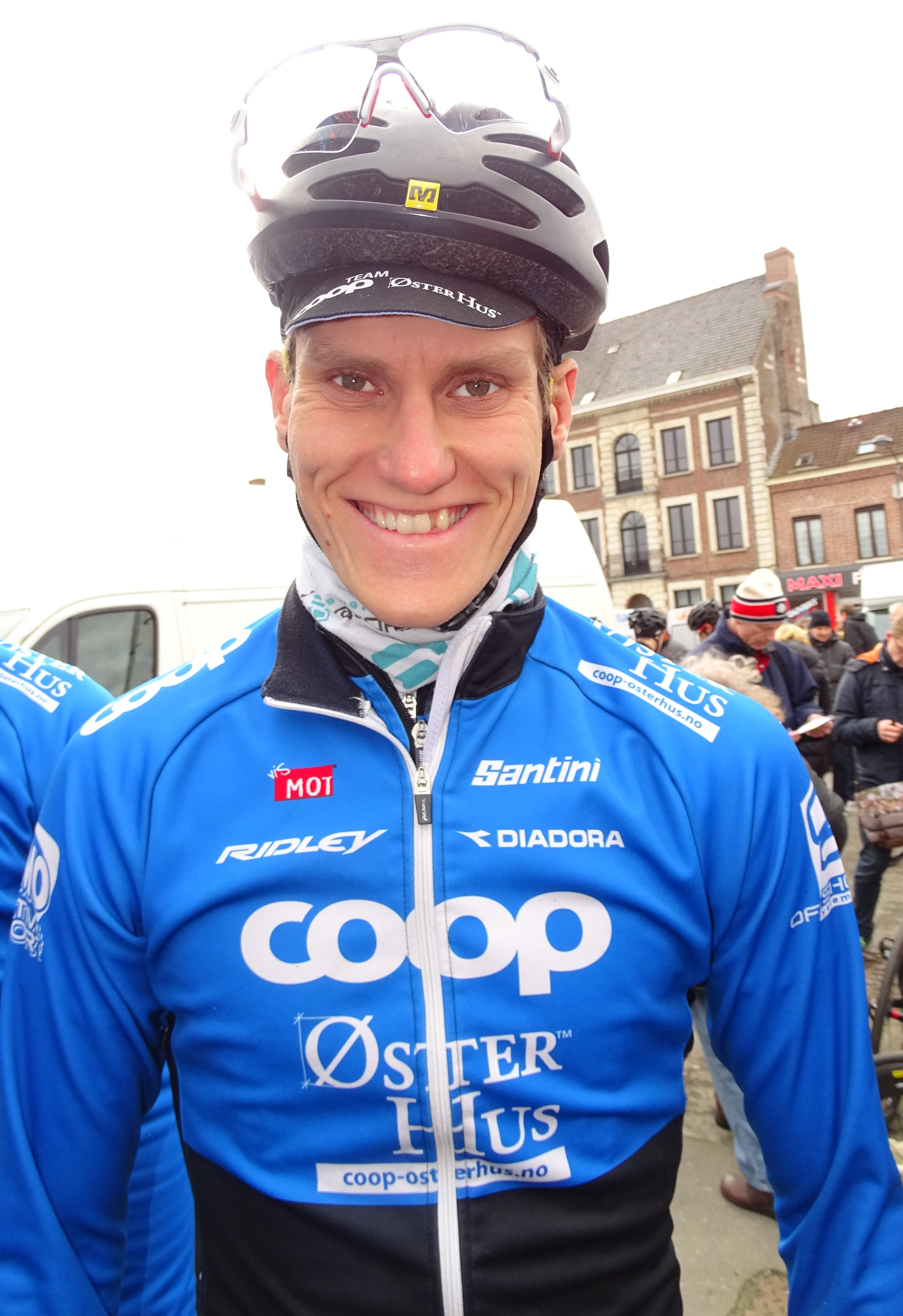
- Hagen in 2016.

Personal information
- Full name: Krister Hagen
- Born: 12 January 1989 (age 37) Kristiansand, Norway

Cycling career
- Sport: Cycling
- Current team: Retired
- Discipline: Road
- Role: Rider

Amateur teams
- 2010: Nesset CK
- 2011–2012: Kristiansands CK

Professional teams
- 2012–2013: OneCo–Mesterhus
- 2014–2018: Team Øster Hus–Ridley
- 2019: Riwal Readynez

Krister Hagen (born 12 January 1989) is a Norwegian former professional cyclist, who rode professionally between 2012 and 2019 for the OneCo, Team Coop and Riwal Readynez teams.

== Major results ==
2015
3rd Gooikse Pijl
5th Time trial, National Road Championships
2016
2nd Overall Volta ao Alentejo
2nd Ringerike GP
3rd Himmerland Rundt
3rd Overall Tour de Gironde
5th Overall East Bohemia Tour
6th Memorial Philippe Van Coningsloo
7th Volta Limburg Classic
7th GP Viborg
2017
1st Mountains classification Kreiz Breizh Elites
2nd Overall East Bohemia Tour

1st Stage 1

4th Overall Volta ao Alentejo
7th GP Viborg
2018
1st Overall Istrian Spring Trophy
1st Trofej Umag
6th Poreč Trophy
7th Sundvolden GP
