= Team Waoo =

Danish cycling team

Team information
- UCI code: TWA
- Registered: Denmark
- Founded: 2012
- Disbanded: 2019
- Discipline: Road
- Status: UCI Continental

Team name history
- 2012–2013 2014–2016 2016 2017 2017–2018 2018–2019: Team Trefor; Team Trefor–Blue Water; Team Virtu Pro–Véloconcept; Team VéloCONCEPT (Note: The team competed under the name of Team VéloCONCEPT from January 1 through to September 11 2017.); Team Virtu Cycling; Team Waoo

Team Waoo was a Danish UCI Continental team founded in 2012, and disbanded in 2019. In July 2016 Bjarne Riis and former Saxo Bank CEO Lars Seier announced that they had taken the team over and renamed it Team Virtu Pro-Veloconcept, with the intention of it functioning as the development team for a planned UCI WorldTeam. On 11 September 2017 the team changed its name into Team Virtu Cycling, after a new owner, Jan Bech Andersen, had bought one third of the shares. In July 2018, the name changed again to Team Waoo.

== Team roster ==
As of May 31, 2019.

Rider	Date of birth
Michael Carbel (DNK)	7 February 1995 (age 31)
Patrick Clausen (DNK)	2 July 1990 (age 36)
Silas Zacharias Clemmensen (DNK)	25 October 1996 (age 29)
Frederik Nybo Eriksen (DNK)	7 March 2000 (age 26)
Oliver Wulff Frederiksen (DNK)	11 October 2000 (age 25)
Rasmus Guldhammer (DNK)	9 March 1989 (age 37)

Rider	Date of birth
Andreas Hyldgaard Jeppesen (DNK)	21 July 1996 (age 30)
Johan Langballe (DNK)	9 February 1999 (age 27)
Mathias Larsen (DNK)	2 May 1999 (age 27)
Martin Mortensen (DNK)	5 November 1984 (age 41)
Jesper Schultz (DNK)	27 February 1996 (age 30)
Frederik Thomsen (DNK)	3 October 2000 (age 25)

== Major wins ==
2013
Course de la Paix U23, Asbjørn Kragh Andersen
2014
Stages 4 & 5 Tour du Loir-et-Cher, Rasmus Guldhammer
Hadeland GP, Rasmus Guldhammer
Denmark National U23 Time Trial Championships, Søren Kragh Andersen
Denmark National Time Trial Championships, Rasmus Quaade
2015
Stage 5 Tour du Loir-et-Cher, Asbjørn Kragh Andersen
Hadeland GP, Søren Kragh Andersen
Ringerike GP, Asbjørn Kragh Andersen
Stage 5 Flèche du Sud, Asbjørn Kragh Andersen
Stage 3 Paris–Arras Tour, Asbjørn Kragh Andersen
Stage 4 Tour des Fjords, Søren Kragh Andersen
Denmark National U23 Time Trial Championships, Jonas Gregaard
Prologue & Stage 3 Tour de l'Avenir, Søren Kragh Andersen
2016
Overall Le Triptyque des Monts et Châteaux, Mads Würtz Schmidt

Stages 2 & 3b, Mads Würtz Schmidt

2017
Stage 3 International Tour of Rhodes, Alexander Kamp
Stage 2 Circuit des Ardennes, Rasmus Guldhammer
Overall Tour du Loir-et-Cher, Alexander Kamp

Stage 4, Alexander Kamp

GP Viborg, Kasper Asgreen
Sundvolden GP, Rasmus Guldhammer
Ringerike GP, Rasmus Guldhammer
2018
Stage 1 Istrian Spring Trophy, Kasper Asgreen
Overall Tour du Loir-et-Cher, Asbjørn Kragh Andersen
Eschborn–Frankfurt Under-23, Niklas Larsen
Stage 1 Rhône-Alpes Isère Tour, Alexander Kamp
Sundvolden GP, Alexander Kamp
Stage 5 Tour of Norway, Alexander Kamp
Circuit de Wallonie, Mikkel Frølich Honoré
Lillehammer GP, Alexander Kamp
2019
Stage 7 Tour de Normandie, Johan Langballe

== National champions ==
2014
Denmark Time Trial, Rasmus Quaade
Denmark U23 Time Trial, Søren Kragh Andersen

2015
Denmark U23 Time Trial, Jonas Gregaard

2016
Denmark U23 Time Trial, Mads Würtz Schmidt
Denmark U23 Road Race, Mads Würtz Schmidt
Denmark Track (Kilo), Niklas Larsen
Denmark Track (Individual pursuit), Niklas Larsen
Denmark Track (Scratch race), Niklas Larsen
