= List of Team TreFor–Blue Water rosters =

This is a list of rosters of the UCI Continental team Team TreFor–Blue Water, categorised by season.

== 2016 ==
Roster in 2016, age as of 1 January 2016:

Rider	Date of birth
Kasper Asgreen (DEN)	8 February 1995 (aged 20)
Niklas Eg (DEN)	6 January 1995 (aged 20)
Daniel Foder (DEN)	7 April 1983 (aged 32)
Anders Hardahl (DEN)	3 May 1996 (aged 19)
Andreas Hyldgaard (DEN)	21 July 1996 (aged 19)
Niklas Larsen (DEN)	22 March 1997 (aged 18)
Christian Moberg (DEN)	13 November 1987 (aged 28)

Rider	Date of birth
Mathias Møller Nielsen (DEN)	19 March 1994 (aged 21)
Mark Sehested Pedersen (DEN)	6 November 1991 (aged 24)
Mads Rahbek (DEN)	19 October 1995 (aged 20)
Thomas Riis (DEN)	31 August 1992 (aged 23)
Nicolaj Steen (DEN)	4 January 1995 (aged 20)
Mads Würtz Schmidt (DEN)	31 March 1994 (aged 21)

== 2015 ==
As of 7 June 2015.

Rider	Date of birth
Asbjørn Kragh Andersen (DEN)	9 April 1992 (age 32)
Søren Kragh Andersen (DEN)	10 August 1994 (age 30)
Patrick Clausen (DEN)	2 July 1990 (age 34)
Daniel Foder (DEN)	4 July 1983 (age 41)
Jonas Gregaard Wilsly (DEN)	30 July 1996 (age 28)
Anders Hardahl (DEN)	3 May 1996 (age 28)
Andreas Hyldgaard Jeppesen (DEN)	21 July 1996 (age 28)

Rider	Date of birth
Sebastian Lander (DEN)	11 March 1991 (age 34)
Michael Olsson (SWE)	4 March 1986 (age 39)
Mark Sehested Pedersen (DEN)	6 November 1991 (age 33)
Mads Baadsgaard Rahbek (DEN)	19 October 1995 (age 29)
Alex Rasmussen (DEN)	9 June 1984 (age 40)
Thomas Nybo Riis (DEN)	31 August 1992 (age 32)
Emil Nygaard Vinjebo (DEN)	24 March 1994 (age 30)

== 2012 ==
Roster in 2012, age as of 1 January 2012:

Rider	Date of birth
Thomas Guldhammer (DEN)	31 July 1987 (aged 24)
Jannik Hyldtoft Hansen (DEN)	19 September 1988 (aged 23)
Kristian Haugaard (DEN)	27 February 1991 (aged 20)
Mathias Holm Hemmsen (DEN)	13 November 1992 (aged 19)
Rasmus Hestbek Lund (DEN)	10 October 1993 (aged 18)
Asbjørn Kragh Andersen (DEN)	9 April 1992 (aged 19)
Rasmus Kristensen (DEN)	5 October 1990 (aged 21)
Klaus Vorgod Kristensen (DEN)	31 July 1989 (aged 22)

Rider	Date of birth
Thomas-Wraae Madsen (DEN)	17 November 1988 (aged 23)
Jens-Erik Madsen (DEN)	30 March 1981 (aged 30)
Nicki Rasmussen (DEN)	31 January 1990 (aged 21)
Klaus-Hieronymus Stenger (DEN)	3 June 1986 (aged 25)
Michael Tronborg (DEN)	13 July 1983 (aged 28)
Rasmus Vorre Louring (DEN)	13 November 1990 (aged 21)
Aske Vorre Louring (DEN)	24 May 1993 (aged 18)

== 2011 ==
Roster in 2011, age as of 1 January 2011:

Rider	Date of birth
Jannik Hyldtoft Hansen (DEN)	19 September 1988 (aged 22)
Michael Damm Kohberg (DEN)	26 October 1989 (aged 21)
Rasmus Kristensen (DEN)	5 October 1990 (aged 20)

Rider	Date of birth
Thomas-Wraae Madsen (DEN)	17 November 1988 (aged 22)
Klaus-Hieronymus Stenger (DEN)	3 June 1986 (aged 24)
Rasmus Vorre Louring (DEN)	13 November 1990 (aged 20)
