= Gren (name) =

Gren is both a given name and a surname. As a given name it is often used as a short name of Grenville or Grenfell. The surname is of Swedish origin and literally means "branch". Notable people with the name include:

== Given name ==
- Gren (Grenfell Jones, 1934–2007), Welsh newspaper cartoonist
- Gren Alabaster (born 1933), New Zealand cricketer
- Grenville Goodwin (c. 1898–1951), Canadian politician
- Gren Jones (footballer) (1932–1991), English football player
- Gren Wells, American filmmaker, screenwriter, and actor

== Surname ==
- Axel Wenner-Gren (1881–1961), Swedish entrepreneur
- Friedrich Albrecht Carl Gren (1760–1798), German chemist
- Gunnar Gren (1920–1991), Swedish football player and coach
- Hans Gren (born 1957), Swedish football manager
- Ivan Gren (1898–1960), Russian and Soviet naval officer
- Linda Gren (born 1974), Swedish footballer
- Martin Gren (born 1962), Swedish entrepreneur and inventor
- Mats Gren (born 1963), Swedish football player and coach

== See also ==
- Landgren
- Lindegren
- Lindgren
- Lundgren
- Sandgren
- Sundgren
