= John Lindgren (disambiguation) =

John Lindgren may refer to:

- John Lindgren (1899–1990), Swedish Olympic cross country skier
- John R. Lindgren (1855–1915), American banking executive

== See also ==
- Johan Lindgren (born 1986), Swedish professional road bicycle racer
- Johan Lundgren (1899–1979), Danish cyclist
- Johan Lundgren (businessman) (born 1966), Swedish businessman
- John Lundgren (disambiguation)
- Jon Lindgren (born 1938), mayor of Fargo, North Dakota, and LGBT advocate
- Lindgren
