= Lindgren =

Lindgren is a surname.

== Geographical distribution ==
As of 2014, 58.0% of all known bearers of the surname Lindgren were residents of Sweden, 26.3% of the United States, 7.0% of Finland, 2.4% of Norway, 1.8% of Denmark and 1.7% of Canada.

In Sweden, the frequency of the surname was higher than the national average in the following counties:

1. Västerbotten (1:108)
2. Norrbotten (1:197)
3. Västmanland (1:310)
4. Västernorrland (1:312)
5. Gävleborg (1:322)
6. Jämtland (1:347)
7. Uppsala (1:352)
8. Dalarna (1:370)
9. Gotland (1:370)
10. Östergötland (1:409)

In Finland, the frequency of the surname was higher than the national average in the following regions:

1. Åland (1:979)
2. Ostrobothnia (1:1,010)
3. Southwest Finland (1:1,067)
4. Uusimaa (1:1,265)
5. Satakunta (1:1,593)
6. Southern Savonia (1:1,766)

== Notable people ==
- Armada (video game player) (Adam Lindgren, born 1993)
- Alexander Lindgren (born 1993), Swedish ice hockey player
- Armas Lindgren, Finnish architect
- Astrid Lindgren (1907–2002), Swedish fiction writer, known for the character Pippi Longstocking
  - 3204 Lindgren, an asteroid named in her honour
- Barbro Lindgren (born 1937), Swedish author
- Blaine Lindgren (1939–2019), American sprinter
- Charles Magnus Lindgren, Swedish-American ship owner
- Charlie Lindgren (born 1993), American professional ice hockey goaltender
- David Lindgren (born 1982), Swedish singer, actor, and television presenter
- Emil Lindgren, Swedish professional mountain biker
- Erick Lindgren, poker professional
- Erik Lindgren, American musician and record producer
- Erik Lindgren (ice hockey), Swedish ice hockey player
- Fredrik Lindgren (golfer) (born 1966), Swedish golfer
- Fredrik Lindgren (ice hockey) (born 1980), Swedish ice hockey player
- Fredrik Lindgren (musician) (1971–2025), Swedish musician
- Fredrik Lindgren (speedway rider) (born 1985), Swedish speedway rider
- Gerry Lindgren (born 1946), American athlete
- George Lindgren, Baron Lindgren (1900–1971), British Labour Party politician
- Glenn Lindgren, chef, food writer, and frequent television and radio guest host
- Göran Lindgren (1927–2012), Swedish film producer
- Gottfrid Lindgren, Swedish wrestler
- Gustaf Lindgren, Swedish architect
- Hans Lindgren (1932–2012), Swedish actor, screenwriter, and film producer
- Harry Lindgren (1912–1992), British/Australian engineer, linguist, and amateur mathematician
- Hugo Lindgren, American magazine and newspaper editor
- Jacob Lindgren, baseball player
- James Lindgren, American professor of law
- Jeff Lindgren (born 1996), American baseball player
- Jesper Lindgren (born 1997), Swedish professional ice hockey defenseman
- Joanna Lindgren, Australian politician
- Johan Lindgren, Swedish professional road bicycle racer
- John Lindgren (1899–1990), Swedish Olympic cross-country skier
- John R. Lindgren, American banking executive
- Jon Lindgren, Mayor of Fargo, North Dakota and LGBT advocate
- Jouko Lindgren (born 1955), Finnish competitive sailor
- Justa Lindgren (1878–1951), American football player and coach
- Kevin Lindgren, Australian lawyer and judge of the Federal Court of Australia
- Kjell N. Lindgren, American astronaut
- Lars Lindgren (born 1952), Swedish ice hockey defenseman
- Lars Lindgren (curler) (born 1957), Swedish curler
- Lars-Magnus Lindgren (1922–2004), Swedish filmmaker
- Lennart Lindgren (1915–1952), Swedish sprinter
- Lennart Lindgren (Swedish Navy officer) (1919–2013)
- Lisa Lindgren (born 1968), Swedish actress
- Lisa Lindgren (American actress) (1960–2005)
- Léon (Swedish singer) (Lotta Lindgren, born 1993)
- Magnus Lindgren (born 1974), Swedish jazz musician
- Magnus Lindgren (chef) (1982–2012), Swedish chef
- Mats Lindgren, Swedish ice hockey player
- Mattias Lindgren (born 1972), Swedish rower
- Michael Lindgren, Swedish actor, producer, and writer
- Minna Lindgren, Finnish writer and journalist
- Niklas Lindgren (born 1972), Swedish serial rapist
- Niklas Lindgren (sailor) (born 1988), Finnish sailor
- Pär Lindgren, Swedish composer and composition teacher
- Peter Lindgren (actor), Swedish actor
- Peter Lindgren (business theorist) (born 1961), Danish organizational theorist
- Peter Lindgren (musician), Swedish guitarist
- Peter Lindgren (tennis), Swedish tennis player
- Perttu Lindgren (born 1987), Finnish professional ice hockey centre
- Rasmus Lindgren, Swedish football player
- Robert Lindgren, American lawyer and educator
- Ryan Lindgren, American ice hockey player
- Sten Lindgren (1903–1959), Swedish film director
- Steven O. Lindgren (born 1949), American educator and politician
- Sven Lindgren (born 1946), Moderate Party politician and former Governor of Kalmar County, Sweden
- Tauno Lindgren, Finnish cyclist
- Thure Lindgren (1921–2005), Swedish ski jumper
- Tommy Lindgren (born 1977), Finnish singer-songwriter and human rights activist
- Torgny Lindgren (1938–2017), Swedish writer
- Ulrik Lindgren, Swedish Christian democratic politician
- Waldemar Lindgren (1860–1939), Swedish-American geologist
- Zeb Lindgren, Swedish ice hockey player

== See also ==
- Lindegren, surname
- Astrid Lindgren Memorial Award
- Astrid Lindgren's World
- Lindgren Acres, Florida
- Lindgren oxidation
- Lindgren Road
