= Oscar Krokstedt =

Swedish Navy officer (1908–1985)

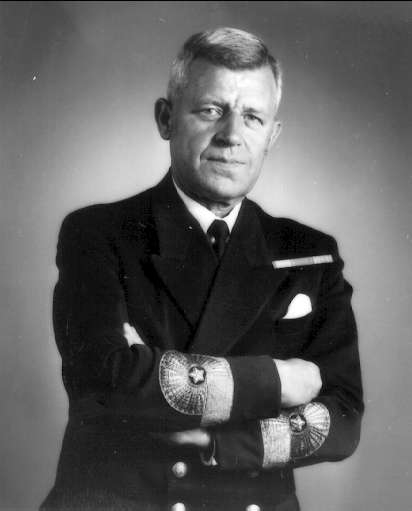
- Born: Nils Oscar Jakob Krokstedt; 12 October 1908; Grötlingbo, Sweden
- Died: 13 December 1985 (aged 77); Stockholm, Sweden
- Military career
- Allegiance: Sweden
- Branch: Swedish Navy
- Service years: 1930–1972
- Rank: Vice Admiral
- Commands: HSwMS Älvsnabben; Naval Department, Defence Staff; Section II, Defence Staff; Chief of the Naval Staff; Swedish National Defence College; Western Military District; Southern Military District

Vice Admiral Nils Oscar Jakob Krokstedt (12 October 1908 – 13 December 1985) was a Swedish Navy officer. His senior commands included Chief of the Naval Staff, head of the Swedish National Defence College and military commander of the Western Military District and the Southern Military District.

== Early life ==
Krokstedt was born on 12 October 1908 in Grötlingbo, Sweden, the son of Axel Krokstedt, a sea captain, and Sigrid (née Söderström). He had an older sister, Astrid Krokstedt (1906–1981), who was first ombudsman in the Swedish Nurses’ Association (Svensk sjuksköterskeförening), and two younger ones, Signe Olga Hermanna (1910–1932), and Karin Sigrid Elisabeth (born 1917). Krokstedt passed studentexamen in Visby in 1926 and came to the Swedish Navy as a sea cadet in 1927 and was later platoon leader in the Cabin Boy Corps (Skeppsgossekåren) in Karlskrona. This gave him a large number of sailing summers on the corps' ships af Chapman, Najaden and Jarramas. He also served aboard HSwMS Fylgia on a sea expedition.

== Career ==
=== Military career ===
He was commissioned as a naval officer in the Swedish Navy in 1930 with the rank of acting sub-lieutenant and was promoted to underlöjtnant in 1932 and to sub-lieutenant in 1934. Krokstedt served at the Stockholm Naval Station (Stockholms örlogsstation) in 1936 and attended the staff course at the Royal Swedish Naval Staff College from 1938 to 1939 and was posted to the Naval Staff as a section chief in from 1946 to 1947. Krokstedt was a teacher at the Royal Swedish Army Staff College from 1946 to 1949 and promoted to lieutenant commander in 1948 and to commander in 1953.

Over the years, Krokstedt served great deal of time on warships, commanding patrol boats, minesweepers and destroyers. He also served several years as flag adjutant, as second-in-command of the HSwMS Gotland during the winter long journey from 1950 to 1951 and as commander of HSwMS Älvsnabben during its first long journey from 1953 to 1954. Krokstedt attended the Swedish National Defence College from 1954 to 1955 and served as head of the Naval Department of the Defence Staff from 1954 to 1957. In 1957 he was promoted to captain and served as a naval attaché in London and The Hague from 1957 to 1960. Krokstedt was head of Section II of the Defence Staff from 1960 to 1961 and was promoted to rear admiral the same year. He was then posted as Acting Chief of the Naval Staff in 1961 and then as Chief of the Naval Staff from 1962 to 1964. Krokstedt served as head of the Swedish National Defence College from 1964 to 1966 and as military commander of the Western Military District from 1966 to 1968. He was promoted to vice admiral in 1968 and served as military commander of the Southern Military District from 1968 to 1972. Krokstedt postings as military commander meant that he, as the first naval officer, got to command not only naval units but also considerable armies and air force units. Krokstedt retired from active service in 1972.

=== Later career ===
When Krokstedt retired, he fulfilled a dream by studying Swedish literary science at Stockholm University at an academic level. When he was done with this with good results, Evert Taube had recently died. He now spent a lot of time rewriting "Evert Taube och sjömansvisan". At the commemoration in May 1984 of the af Chapman, former quartermaster Krokstedt was the one who, under salute, boarded the now hostel and received the eleven jubilant crews.

Krokstedt was Inspector Emeriti of the naval academy association SjöLund. He was also a member of the Swedish Society for Maritime History (Sjöhistoriska samfundet).

== Personal life ==
In 1932, he married Ingrid Ljungberg (born 1909), the daughter of Wilhelm Ljungberg and Anna (née Häggström). They had one son, Lars Krokstedt (born 1934), CEO of AB Alfort & Cronholm (today Alcro) from 1973 to 1981, and CEO of Svenska Egmont AB from 1981, and the daughters Lisen Gylden and Briten Krokstedt.

== Death ==
Krokstedt died on 13 December 1985 in Stockholm. The funeral service took place on 30 December 1985 in Skeppsholmen Church in Stockholm.

== Dates of rank ==
- 1930 – Acting sub-lieutenant
- 1932 – Underlöjtnant
- 1934 – Sub-lieutenant
- 1941 – Lieutenant
- 1948 – Lieutenant commander
- 1953 – Commander
- 1957 – Captain
- 1961 – Rear admiral
- 1968 – Vice admiral

== Awards and decorations ==
=== Swedish ===
- (Sweden) Commander Grand Cross of the Order of the Sword (6 June 1968)
- (Sweden) Commander 1st Class of the Order of the Sword (6 June 1964)
- (Sweden) Knight of the Order of Vasa

=== Foreign ===
- (Norway) Commander with Star of the Order of St. Olav (1 July 1967)
- (Colombia) Commander of the Order of Naval Merit Admiral Padilla (Note: The Swedish abbreviation is stated as ColAPO, which is not stated in the abbreviation description here. Most likely it is a misspelling of the abbreviation ColNAP, which stands for the Order of Naval Merit Admiral Padilla.)
- (Brazil) Officer of the Order of Naval Merit
- (Nazi Germany) 3rd Class of the Order of the German Eagle

== Honours ==
- Member of the Royal Swedish Academy of War Sciences (1960)
- Honorary member of the Royal Swedish Society of Naval Sciences (1961)
- Honorary member of Flottans Mäns riksförening
- Honorary member of Flottans Mäns Gotland

== Footnotes ==
Military offices
Preceded by Magnus Starck	Defence Staff's Naval Department; 1954–1957	Succeeded by ?
Preceded by Holger Henning	Section II of the Defence Staff; 1960–1961	Succeeded by Åke Mangård¹
Preceded by Åke Lindemalm as Acting	Chief of the Naval Staff; 1961–1964	Succeeded by Henrik Lange
Preceded by Sam Myhrman	Swedish National Defence College; 1964–1966	Succeeded by Malcolm Murray
Preceded by Fale Burman	Western Military District; 1966–1968	Succeeded by Henrik Lange
Preceded by Stig Norén	Southern Military District; 1968–1972	Succeeded by Karl Eric Holm
Notes and references
1. After 1961, Section II was called Operationsledning II/2 (OpLII/OpL2) - krigsplanläggning ("Operations Command II/2 (OpLII/OpL2) - war planning")
