= 2011 Tour of Norway =

2011 Glava Tour of Norway
2011 UCI Europe Tour

Race details
- Dates: 1—5 June 2011
- Stages: 5
- Distance: 891 km (553.6 mi)
- Winning time: 21h 04' 03"

Results
| Jersey awarded to the overall winner | Winner | Wilco Kelderman (NED) | (Rabobank) |
| | Second | Daniel Foder (DEN) | (Glud & Marstrand–LRØ) |
| | Third | Vegard Robinson Bugge (NOR) | (Joker–Merida) |
| Jersey awarded to the mountains classification winner | Mountains | Stian Remme (NOR) | (Joker–Merida) |
| Jersey awarded to the youth classification winner | Youth | Wilco Kelderman (NED) | (Rabobank) |
| Jersey awarded to the sprints classification winner | Sprints | Lars Andersson (SWE) | |

The 2011 Glava Tour of Norway was the first edition of the Glava Tour of Norway cycle race. It formed part of the 2011 UCI Europe Tour.

== Teams ==
| Continental teams | National teams | Club teams |
|---|---|---|
| Christina Watches–Onfone; Cycling Team De Rijke; Endura Racing; Glud & Marstrand; Joker Merida; LKT Team Brandenburg; Motorpoint Pro–Cycling Team; Plussbank Cervélo; Rabobank; Restore–EBH Elshof CT; Seven Stones; Sparebanken Vest–Ridley; Team Concordia Forsikring–Himmerland; Team Cykelcity; Team Jayco–AIS; Team Ringeriks–Kraft | Russia; Sweden | Asker; Frøy; Grenland; Lillehammer; Nesset; Sandnes; Trondhjem; Østfold |

== Stages ==
| Stage | Date | Start | Finish | Km | Stagewinner |
|---|---|---|---|---|---|
| 1 | 1. June | (Norway) Tønsberg | (Norway) Larvik | 173 | (Sweden) Jesper Dahlström (SWE) |
| 2 | 2. June | (Norway) Skien | (Norway) Drammen | 173 | (Australia) Michael Hepburn (JAI) |
| 3 | 3. June | (Norway) Sarpsborg | (Norway) Halden | 174 | (Sweden) Johan Lindgren (CYK) |
| 4 | 4. June | (Norway) Jessheim | (Norway) Hamar | 194 | (Spain) Iker Camaño (EDR) |
| 5 | 5. June | (Norway) Hamar | (Norway) Lillestrøm | 177 | (Norway) Christer Rake (TJM) |

== Jerseys day by day ==
| Stage | General Classification | Nordialog super sprint | Samsung King of the Mountains | Skoda young riders classification(U26) |
| 1 | Jesper Dahlström | Lars Andersson | Stian Remme | Jesper Dahlström |
| 2 | Wilco Kelderman | René Jørgensen | Stian Remme | Wilco Kelderman |
| 3 | Wilco Kelderman | René Jørgensen | Stian Remme | Wilco Kelderman |
| 4 | Wilco Kelderman | Lars Andersson | Christofer Stevenson | Wilco Kelderman |
| 5 | Wilco Kelderman | Lars Andersson | Stian Remme | Wilco Kelderman |
| Winner | Wilco Kelderman | Lars Andersson | Stian Remme | Wilco Kelderman |

== Stage results ==
=== Wednesday 1. June – 1. stage: Tønsberg – Larvik, 173 km ===
Results

| | Rider | Team | Time |
|---|---|---|---|
| 1 | (Sweden) Jesper Dahlström | Sweden | 4:06.16 |
| 2 | (Denmark) Daniel Foder | Glud & Marstrand | + 0.00 |
| 3 | (Norway) Vegard Robinson Bugge | Joker Merida | + 0.00 |
| 4 | (Denmark) Andreas Frisch | Team Concordia Forsikring | + 0.05 |
| 5 | (Netherlands) Wilco Kelderman | Rabobank | + 0.05 |

Overall

| | Rider | Team | Time |
|---|---|---|---|
| 1 | (Sweden) Jesper Dahlström | Sweden | 4:06.16 |
| 2 | (Denmark) Daniel Foder | Glud & Marstrand | + 0.00 |
| 3 | (Norway) Vegard Robinson Bugge | Joker Merida | + 0.00 |
| 4 | (Denmark) Andreas Frisch | Team Concordia Forsikring | + 0.05 |
| 5 | (Netherlands) Wilco Kelderman | Rabobank | + 0.05 |

=== Thursday 2. June – 2. stage: Skien – Drammen, 173 km ===
Results

| | Rider | Team | Time |
|---|---|---|---|
| 1 | (Australia) Michael Hepburn | Team Jayco–AIS | 4:12.29 |
| 2 | (Denmark) René Jørgensen | Christina Watches–Onfone | + 0.00 |
| 3 | (Netherlands) Wilco Kelderman | Rabobank | + 0.00 |
| 4 | (Norway) Frederik Wilmann | Joker Merida | + 0.00 |
| 5 | (Denmark) Michael Rasmussen | Christina Watches–Onfone | + 0.00 |

Overall

| | Rider | Team | Time |
|---|---|---|---|
| 1 | (Netherlands) Wilco Kelderman | Rabobank | 8:18.50 |
| 2 | (Denmark) Daniel Foder | Glud & Marstrand | + 0.05 |
| 3 | (Norway) Vegard Robinson Bugge | Joker Merida | + 0.05 |
| 4 | (Denmark) Michael Rasmussen | Christina Watches–Onfone | + 0.08 |
| 5 | (Norway) Frederik Wilmann | Joker Merida | + 0.08 |

=== Friday 3. June – 3. stage: Sarpsborg – Halden, 174 km ===
Results

| | Rider | Team | Time |
|---|---|---|---|
| 1 | (Sweden) Johan Lindgren | Team Cykelcity | 4:01.06 |
| 2 | (United Kingdom) Jonathan McEvoy | Motorpoint | + 0.04 |
| 3 | (New Zealand) Jack Bauer | Endura Racing | + 0.04 |
| 4 | (Norway) Christer Rake | Joker Merida | + 0.04 |
| 5 | (Denmark) Daniel Foder | Glud & Marstrand | + 0.04 |

Overall

| | Rider | Team | Time |
|---|---|---|---|
| 1 | (Netherlands) Wilco Kelderman | Rabobank | 12.20.00 |
| 2 | (Denmark) Daniel Foder | Glud & Marstrand | + 0.05 |
| 3 | (Norway) Vegard Robinson Bugge | Joker Merida | + 0.05 |
| 4 | (Denmark) Michael Rasmussen | Christina Watches–Onfone | + 0.08 |
| 5 | (Norway) Frederik Wilmann | Joker Merida | + 0.08 |

=== Saturday 4. June – 4. stage: Jessheim – Hamar, 194 km ===
Results

| | Rider | Team | Time |
|---|---|---|---|
| 1 | (Spain) Iker Camaño | Endura Racing | 4:33.57 |
| 2 | (Poland) Marcin Białobłocki | Motorpoint | + 0.00 |
| 3 | (Italy) Angelo Furlan | Christina Watches–Onfone | + 0.00 |
| 4 | (United Kingdom) Ian Bibby | Motorpoint | + 0.00 |
| 5 | (Norway) Roy Hegreberg | Sparebanken Vest – Ridley | + 0.00 |

Overall

| | Rider | Team | Time |
|---|---|---|---|
| 1 | (Netherlands) Wilco Kelderman | Rabobank | 16:53.57 |
| 2 | (Denmark) Daniel Foder | Glud & Marstrand | + 0.05 |
| 3 | (Norway) Vegard Robinson Bugge | Joker Merida | + 0.05 |
| 4 | (Denmark) Michael Rasmussen | Christina Watches–Onfone | + 0.08 |
| 5 | (Norway) Frederik Wilmann | Joker Merida | + 0.08 |

=== Sunday 5. June – 5. stage: Hamar – Lillestrøm, 177 km ===
Results

| | Rider | Team | Time |
|---|---|---|---|
| 1 | (Norway) Christer Rake | Joker Merida | 4:10.22 |
| 2 | (Italy) Angelo Furlan | Christina Watches–Onfone | + 0.04 |
| 3 | (Norway) Frans-Leonard Markaskard | Team Ringeriks–Kraft | + 0.04 |
| 4 | (United Kingdom) Jonathan McEvoy | Motorpoint | + 0.04 |
| 5 | (Spain) Iker Camaño | Endura Racing | + 0.04 |

Overall

| | Rider | Team | Time |
|---|---|---|---|
| 1 | (Netherlands) Wilco Kelderman | Rabobank | 21:04.03 |
| 2 | (Denmark) Daniel Foder | Glud & Marstrand | + 0.05 |
| 3 | (Norway) Vegard Robinson Bugge | Joker Merida | + 0.05 |
| 4 | (Denmark) Michael Rasmussen | Christina Watches–Onfone | + 0.08 |
| 5 | (Norway) Frederik Wilmann | Joker Merida | + 0.08 |

== Webpages ==
- Official website
