= Ninth grade =

Ninth year of school education in some school systems

Ninth grade (also 9th or Grade 9) is the ninth year of formal or compulsory education in some countries. It is generally part of high school or secondary school depending on the country. Students in ninth grade are usually 14–15 years old.

== Afghanistan ==
In Afghanistan, ninth grade is the third year of secondary school, which starts in seventh grade. Under the 2004 Constitution of Afghanistan, education up to ninth grade (about age 15) was compulsory. In 2013, students were generally gender-segregated by ninth grade, with female students taught by female teachers.

In 2021, the Taliban abolished the 2004 constitution and banned female students from attending secondary school. In March 2022, the Taliban announced that secondary schools would reopen for girls but closed them again soon after.

== Brazil ==
In Brazil, grade 9 (9º Ano or 9ª Série) is the fourth and last year of middle school. It is the nono ano do Ensino Fundamental II.

== Canada ==
In Canada, the equivalent is Grade 9. In most of Canada, Grade 9 is the last year of junior high school or the first year of high school depending on province and students are typically about age 15. In Quebec, however, Grade 9 is the middle year of its five-year high school program.

== Denmark ==
In Denmark, grade 9 (around age 16, also called form level 9) is the final year of compulsory education, and grade 10 is optional. Public comprehensive schools up to grade 10 are called Folkeskole. Grade 9 subjects include Danish, English, Christian studies, history, social studies, mathematics, geography, biology, physics/chemistry and German and French as electives. Students must sit compulsory school-leaving exams at the end of grade 9, and must also complete a mandatory project assignment during the year.

After grade 9, students have the option of attending general or vocational upper secondary education for two or three years until they are around 19.

== Finland ==
In Finland, ninth grade is the last year of comprehensive education Students are generally aged around 16 when they finish 9th grade. This years subjects generally include Finnish, Swedish, English, an elective language, religious education/ethics, social studies, mathematics, geography, biology, physics, chemistry, physical education, health education, and another elective of their choice. This year also has students taking a 2 week TET-program.

Before winter break, students have mandatory guidance counselling sessions in which they discuss their GPA, alongside future career paths and potential school choices for the next school year. Starting February, students have until March to apply to upper secondary schools through the national joint application system (yhteishaku). Most comprehensive schools also have nationwide school-leaving exams in late spring, usually in Finnish and mathematics, meant to help teachers grade their students on a more national scale. After graduating, students get a Perusopetuksen päättötodistus. They can then attend vocational or academic high schools (generally for 3 years).

In August 2021, the Finnish government raised the age of compulsory education from 16 to 18, making the national joint application system mandatory for all 9th graders. Should a student be unsure of what they want to study, or do not have a GPA high enough to apply for upper secondary education, they are then placed in the TUVA system where they can gain qualifications for further studies, and learn more about vocational and upper secondary education.

== Germany ==
In Germany, grade 9 (about age 15) is generally the last year of lower secondary school and the end of compulsory full-time education. Qualifications gained in this year will determine the student's eligibility for academic or vocational upper secondary school.

== India ==
Following the National Education Policy 2020, ninth grade in India is the buffer year between middle and high school (generally ages 13 to 14). The intention of the new policy for ninth grade is to encourage multidisciplinary study, with students having greater flexibility and choice of subjects. Schools are affiliated with various curriculum and education boards which set required subjects based on the national curriculum; for example, students attending CBSE schools must take five compulsory subjects (English, Sanskrit/Hindi, Mathematics, Social Studies and Science) and may take up to four electives.

== Kazakhstan ==
In Kazakhstan, Grade 9 (9-сынып) is the final year of basic secondary education (негізгі орта мектеп). Students typically enter at 14–15 years old and take the State Final Attestation (SFA) exams, which determine eligibility for upper secondary education or vocational programs.

== Kuwait ==
In Kuwait, ninth grade is the last year of intermediate school and students are usually around 14 years old. At this level, the school district runs standardized tests at the end of the second and fourth quarters of the year, and students will be promoted to grade 10 (the first year of secondary school) if they achieve at least 50% in each subject. Under the Constitution of Kuwait, all Kuwaitis are entitled to a free education until the end of secondary school, but a large percentage of the population is non-Kuwaiti and not covered by this requirement. There are also no legal rules preventing students from dropping out at age 15, after completing ninth grade.

== Mexico ==
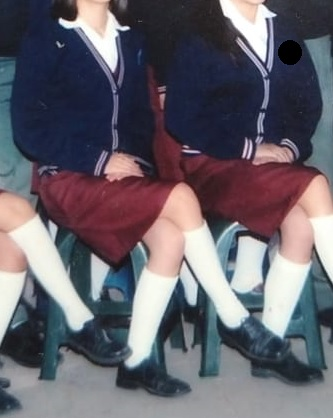
Mexican ninth graders, seen wearing a uniform

In Mexico, ninth grade is the last year of Educación Secundaria (lower secondary education). Schooling up to ninth grade became compulsory in 1992, although as of 2019, some areas (particularly rural and indigenous communities) still have low participation rates. It is the last year of basic education in Mexico, and students are generally aged 14–15.

Students will either take an academic program (secundaria general), a vocational and technical program (secundaria técnica) or a distance program (telesecundaria). All programs include courses on Spanish, English, mathematics, biology, chemistry, physics, history, civics, geography, arts, other languages and sometimes specialised subjects specific to local areas (for example, indigenous languages). As of 2019, just over half of students were enrolled in secundaria general, around 27% in secundaria técnica, and the rest in telesecundaria.

After completing ninth grade, students will be awarded a Certificado de Educación Secundaria. No examinations are required to graduate.

== Norway ==
In Norway, ninth grade is the middle grade of lower secondary school, called ungdomsskole (ages 13 to 16). Education up to tenth grade is mandatory for Norwegian students, and courses must align with the national curriculum. Although students must take national standardised tests in numeracy and reading in ninth grade, the results do not affect progression to tenth grade or to admission to upper secondary school.

== Pakistan ==
In Pakistan ninth grade is the first year of secondary education, which may be general (four years) or vocational (two years). Students are generally 14–15 years old. The country's constitution provides for free and compulsory education up to grade 10 (age 16), but in practice only around 30% of children attend high school. In all school grades, boys outnumber girls; in 2017, only 13% of Pakistani girls were still in school at ninth grade level.

At a general school, students choose their subjects at the beginning of ninth grade and then sit Secondary School Certificate examinations in these subjects at the end of tenth grade. Students usually select eight subjects, including four or five compulsory subjects (typically English, Urdu, mathematics, Islamic studies and Pakistan studies) and three electives. Generally the electives will be chosen from one of three different specialised streams: humanities (e.g. geography, economics), science (e.g. biology, chemistry) or technical subjects (e.g. engineering). Passing the exams allows entry into eleventh grade and upper secondary education.

At a technical school, students typically obtain a vocational diploma after sitting exams at the end of tenth grade, in subjects including English, a Pakistani language, Islamic studies, physics, mathematics, technical drawing and theory, and practical training for their chosen profession.

Some students, particularly those in rural areas, may attend religious Islamic schools (known as madrasahs) which do not have standardised curricula. Some of these schools provide only religious education, while others may include subjects from the national curriculum and equivalent examinations. In 2020, it was announced that madrasahs would be required to adopt the national curriculum within four to five years.

== Philippines ==
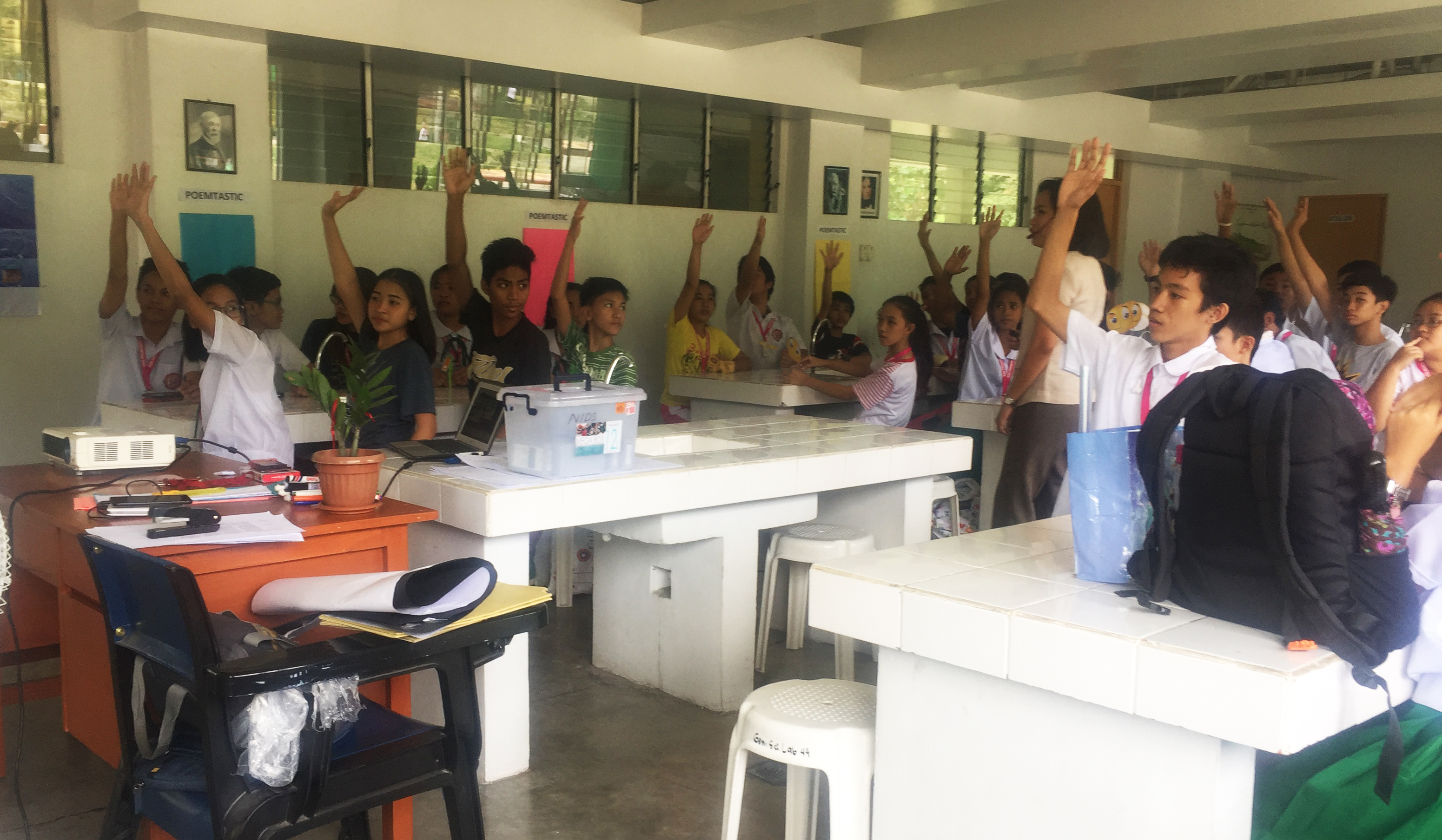
Ninth graders in Quezon City, the Philippines

In the Philippines, ninth grade was formerly known as third year (Filipino: Ikatlong Taon) until it changed to ninth grade (Filipino: Baitang Siyam) on June 2, 2014, upon the start of school year 2014–2015 due to the implementation of the K–12 curriculum from May 20, 2008, and became effective on April 24, 2012. Both the old and current system are called as junior year. Students at this level are usually 14–15 years old.

Before the 2016–2017 school year, secondary school covered grades 7 to 10 (high school) and was not compulsory. Due to the implementation of the K–12, secondary education was extended to cover grades up to 12. Grades 7 to 10 are now junior high school and attendance at this level is free and compulsory.

The subjects covered at junior high school level are the same as those covered at elementary school, including Filipino, English, Mathematics, Science, Social Science, Philippine history and culture, physical education and arts. Subjects are taught in English and Filipino, unlike earlier grades, which may be taught in students' native or indigenous languages.

Students can also start at the young age of 13.

== Portugal ==
In Portugal, the ninth grade (nono ano, 9º ano) is the last year of the three-year lower secondary school program (3º Ciclo do Ensino Básico). Students are generally around 14 years old. It is followed by the tenth grade, the first year of three-year upper secondary education (Ensino Secundário). School is free and compulsory in Portugal up to twelfth grade. At the end of the ninth grade, students must take national final exams (Provas finais nacionais).

== Sweden ==
In Sweden, ninth grade (sometimes also called year 9) is the last year of the upper stage of compulsory education (grundskola), sometimes known as högstadium. The students are usually 15–16 years old. At the end of ninth grade, students must sit national exams in Swedish, mathematics, English and sciences.

After completing 9th grade, students can attend non-compulsory upper secondary school (gymnasium) or take another form of education, such as a vocational program. Entrance requirements differ depending on programme, but generally students will need to have passed at least their Swedish, mathematics and English exams. Although not compulsory, most Swedish students continue to upper secondary school.

== United States ==
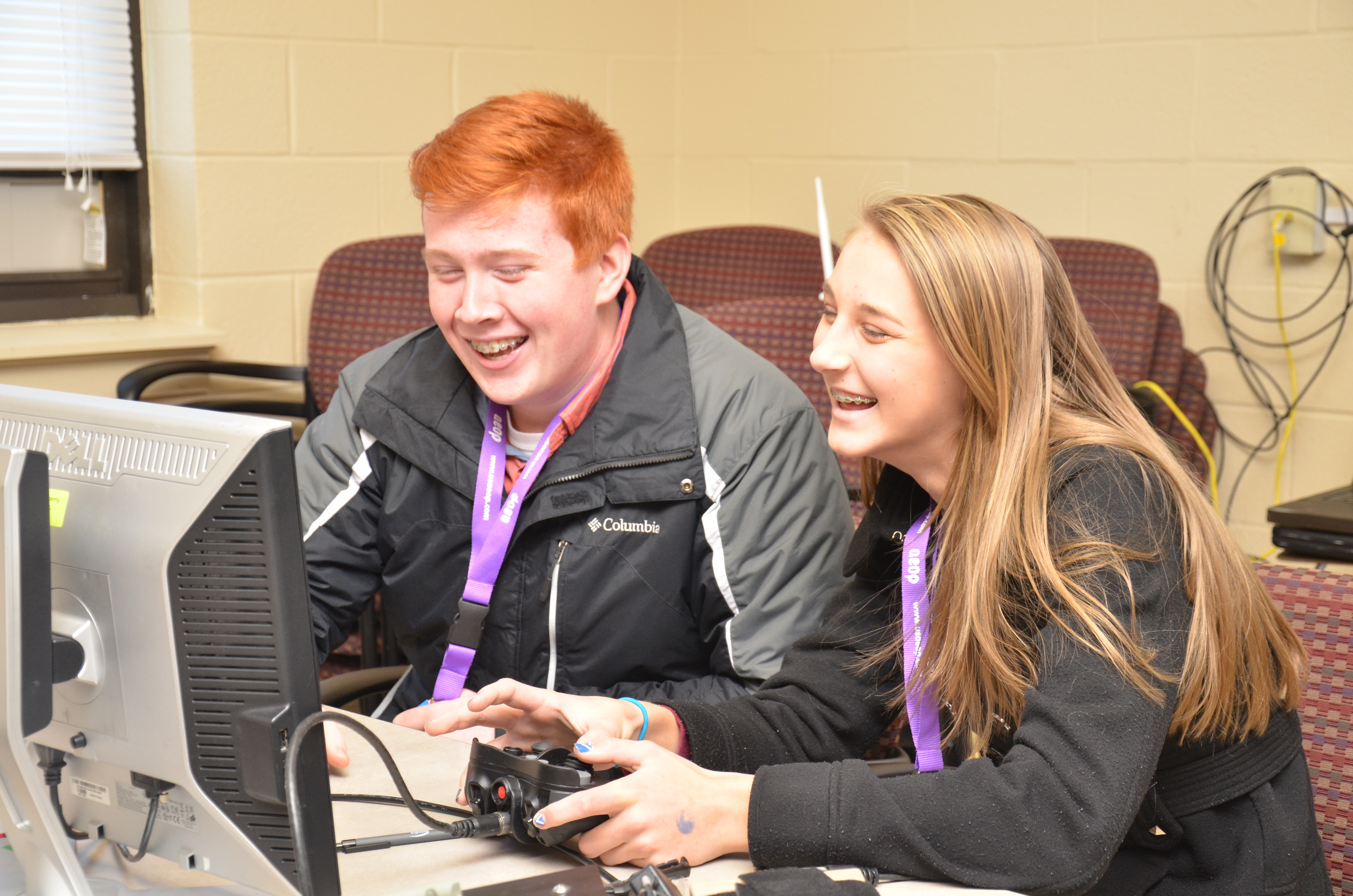
Two American ninth graders at the 2014 APG STEM Expo

In the United States, ninth grade is usually the first year of high school. In this system, ninth graders are also often referred to as freshmen. It can also be the last year of junior high school depending on the state. The average age for U.S. 9th grade students is 14 to 15 years old. The University of Chicago Consortium on School Research identified in 2017 that passing ninth grade courses is a predictor of high school graduation.

In the math curriculum, ninth graders are usually taught algebra, however, they may take geometry or more advanced algebra if they've taken algebra previously. Advanced courses are usually available to ninth graders who are prepared for a more rigorous curriculum, depending on the school district.

In the English curriculum, most schools offer basic courses, advanced courses, and honors courses. The basic course for a ninth grader will often teach the fundamentals of higher-level literature and how to analyze and respond to such literature. More advanced courses may be offered depending on the school district and may focus on one type of literature, such as American literature or British literature, and may be taken instead of or besides standard classes. Students may study some works of William Shakespeare, such as Romeo and Juliet.

In the social studies curriculum, there are a variety of different courses that may be offered depending on the school district. For example, students may either take a world history class, a government class, or a U.S./American history class.

In the science curriculum, ninth-grade students are required, in most areas, to take Biology. However, they can take different courses before they take Biology, such as Integrated Science. Other forms of sciences, such as basic physical science or earth sciences, could also be part of the curriculum as well, depending on the school district.

Typically, ninth-graders will be required to earn a minimum number of credits, usually six or seven carnegie units or roughly five classes per year depending on state, in order to advance to tenth grade. Some schools require community service.

== See also ==
- Educational stage
- Year 9

Preceded by Eighth grade	Ninth Grade age 14–15	Succeeded by Tenth grade
