= Eighth grade =

Educational year

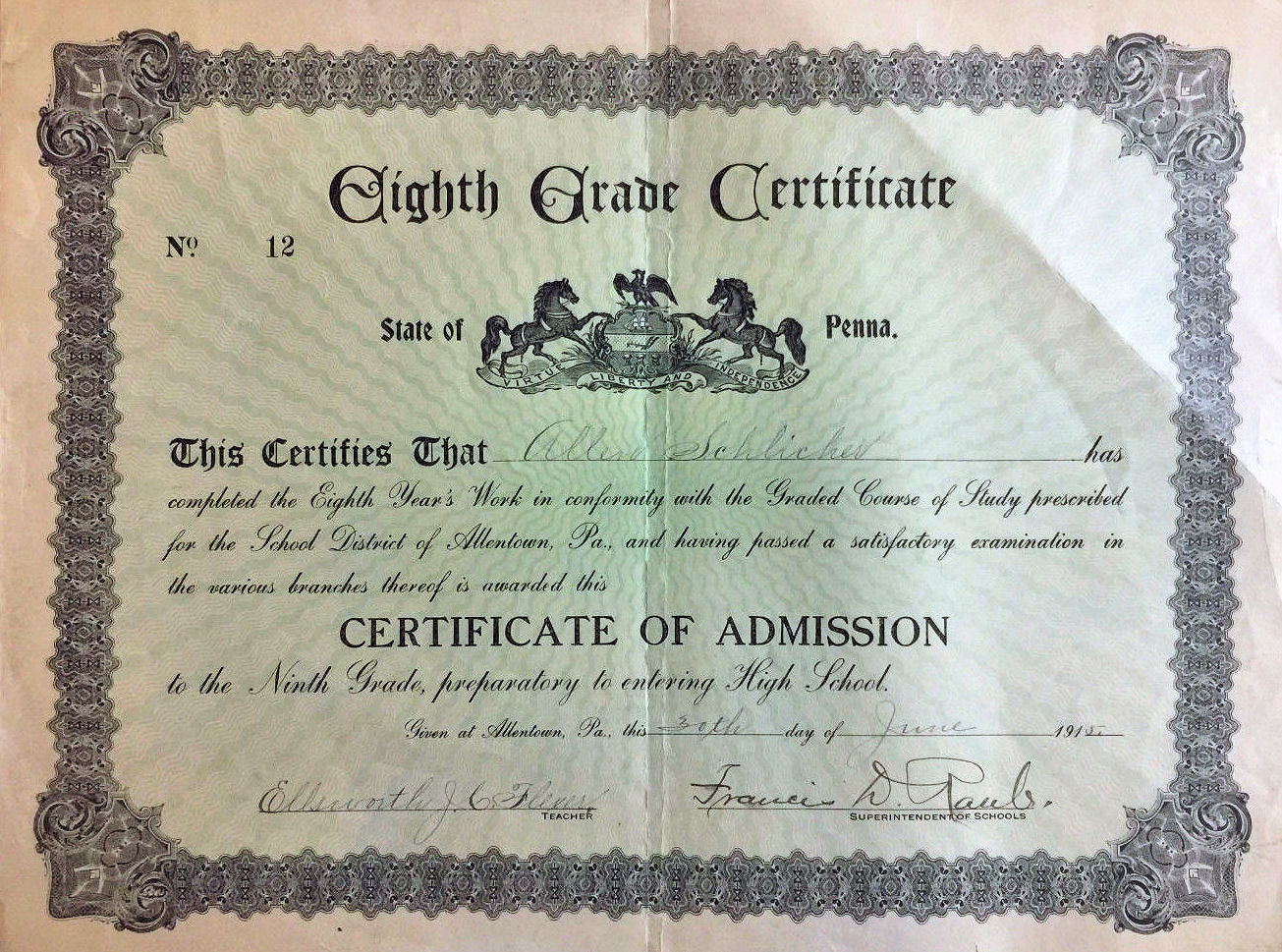
An "eighth grade certificate", dating from 1915 and issued in Allentown, Pennsylvania

Eighth grade (also 8th grade or Grade 8) is the eighth year of formal or compulsory education in the United States. The eighth grade is the third or fourth (and typically final) year of middle school. Students in eighth grade are usually 13–14 years old. Different terms and numbers are used in other parts of the world.

== Brazil ==
In Brazil, Grade 8 (8º Ano or 8ª Série) is the third year of middle school. It is the oitavo ano do Ensino Fundamental II.

== Canada ==
In Canada, it is equivalent to that of the United States.

== United Kingdom ==
In England, Year 9 is the educational year group equivalent, and the last year in Key Stage 3 development. Year 9 is used in England, Wales, Australia and New Zealand. In Scotland, Year 9 is the equivalent of S3 (Third Year) in secondary school. It is the tenth or eleventh year of compulsory education.

== India ==
In India, 8th grade is the last grade before high school. 8th grade exam is the second last year the respective school will set the examination. Students typically include subjects such as mathematics, science, social studies, languages and elective subjects.

== Finland ==
In Finland, 8th grade is the second year of lower secondary education. Students in this year are generally age 13 - 15. This year also drops off practical/artistic subjects unless taken as an elective the previous year. 8th grade is the last year students study music and history, meaning grades transition over to the 9th grade ones and cannot be changed.

Only one subject known as "student counselling" is introduced this grade. Its main purpose is to introduce upper secondary education, improve work skills, and to help students find their most effective way of learning. This year also has students taking a 1 week TET-program.

== See also ==
- Educational stage
- Secondary education

Preceded by Seventh grade	Eighth grade age 13–14	Succeeded by Ninth grade
