= Peter Lindgren =

Peter Lindgren may refer to:

- Peter Lindgren (actor) (1915–1981), Swedish actor
- Peter Lindgren (musician) (born 1973), Swedish heavy metal guitarist
- Peter Lindgren (business theorist) (born 1961), Danish organizational theorist
- Peter Lindgren (tennis) (born 1964), Swedish professional tennis player
