= Gren (disambiguation) =

Gren may refer to

- Gren, the pen-name of cartoonist Grenfell "Gren" Jones
- Gren (band)
- Gren (name)
- Gren automotive, an international manufacturer of automotive brake components
- Piz Gren, a mountain of the Swiss Lepontine Alps
- Wenner-Gren Center in Vasastaden, Stockholm
- Ivan Gren-class landing ship
