= Lennart Lindgren (Swedish Navy officer) =

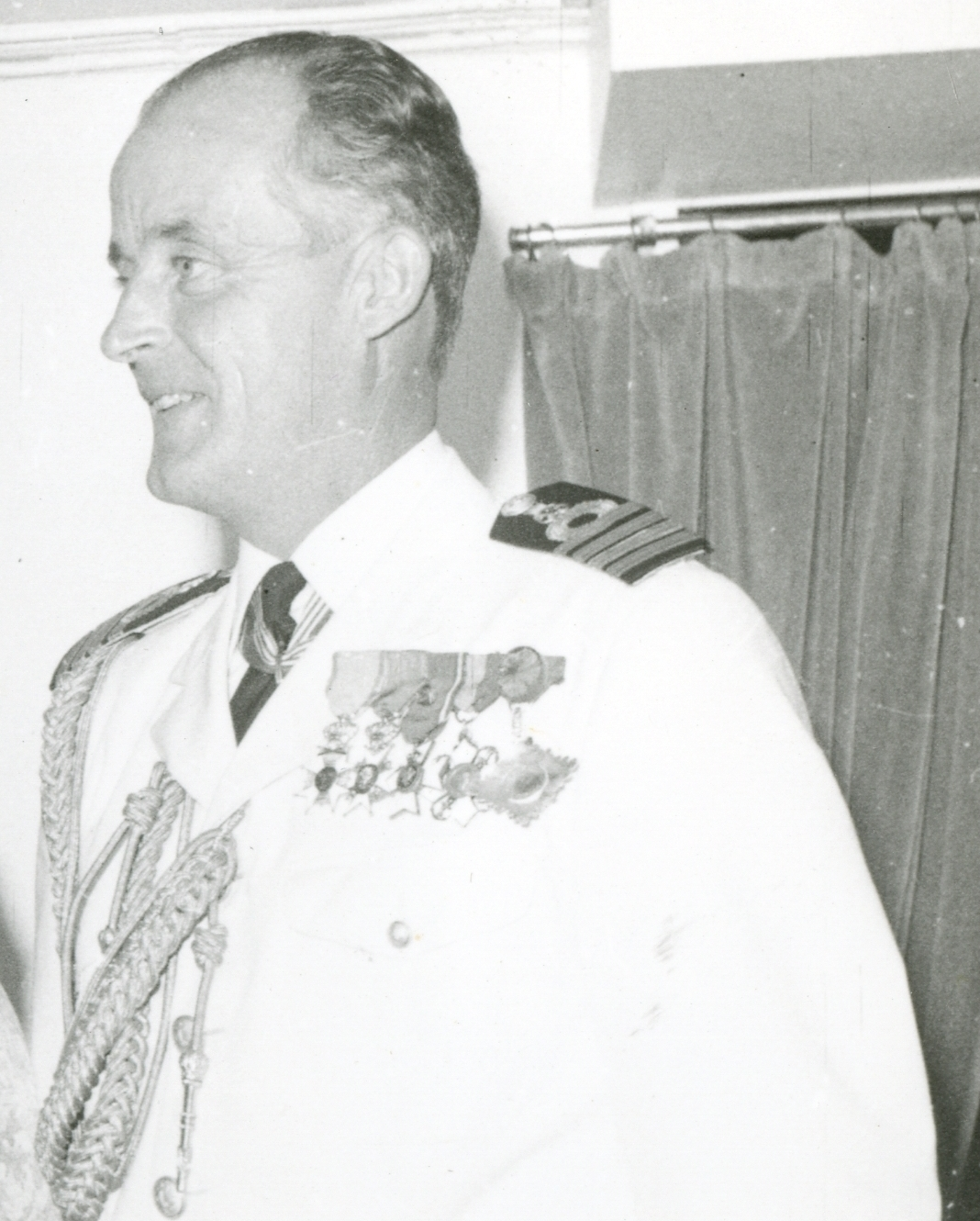
- Lindgren in 1966/67.
- Born: Nils Lennart Lindgren; 1 September 1919; Stockholm, Sweden
- Died: 25 February 2013 (aged 93)
- Burial place: Djursholm Cemetery
- Military career
- Allegiance: Sweden
- Branch: Swedish Navy
- Service years: 1941–1979
- Rank: Captain
- Commands: HSwMS Älvsnabben (M01); HSwMS Småland (J19); Swedish Auxiliary Naval Corps

Captain Nils Lennart Lindgren (1 September 1919 – 25 February 2013) was a Swedish Navy officer. He commanded the minelayer HSwMS Älvsnabben (M01) and the destroyer HSwMS Småland (J19), and served as head of the Swedish Auxiliary Naval Corps. Lindgren also served at the Swedish embassies in Washington, D.C., and Copenhagen as a naval and military attaché.

== Early life ==
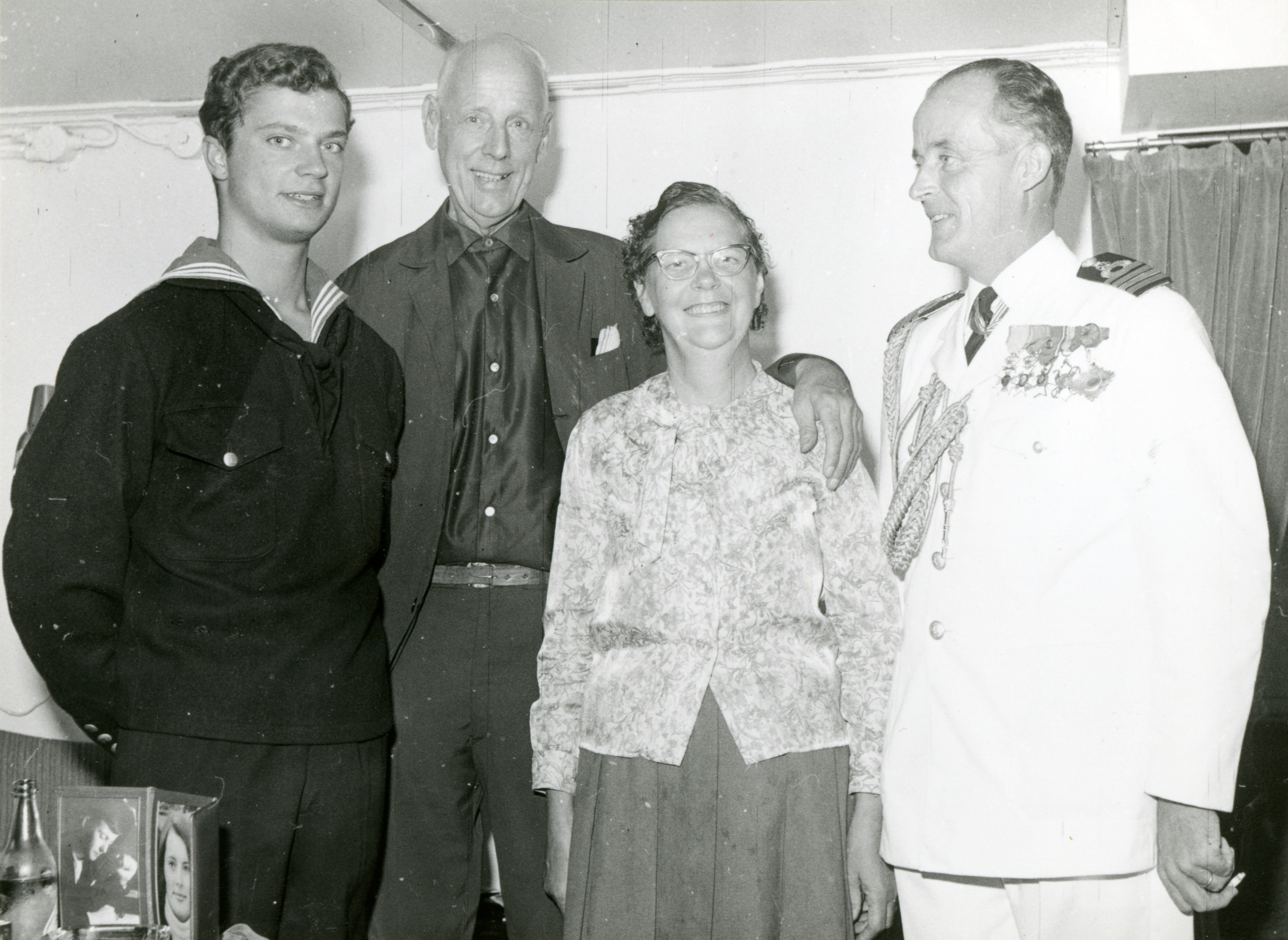
Crown Prince Carl Gustaf (left) and Lindgren (right) during Älvsnabben's round-the-world trip in 1966/67.

Lindgren was born on 1 September 1919 in Stockholm, Sweden, the son of Naval Captain Bengt Lindgren and his wife Lucy (née Haglund). He passed studentexamen in Djursholm in 1938 and began his naval career as a teenager and schoolboy by internship aboard destroyers and cabin boy brigs. After that Lindgren spent weeks aboard the destroyer HSwMS Klas Uggla (4) in the summer of 1934. Two years later, he served on the destroyer HSwMS Klas Horn (3) and was recommended for entry into the Royal Swedish Naval Academy. He also served aboard the seaplane cruiser HSwMS Gotland during its voyage to South America.

== Career ==
At the outbreak of World War II in 1939, Lindgren, who belonged to the junior course, was sent home, while the older course were directly appointed acting sub-lieutenants"). He was, however, recalled fairly quickly and Lindgren and his classmates graduated from the Royal Swedish Naval Academy and were commissioned as naval officers in 1941. The first step in his destroyer career was taken aboard the destroyer Klas Horn with a position as a protection officer. Escort and patrol services followed between Landsort and Kråkelund. On 25 November 1943, Lindgren served aboard the destroyer HSwMS Norrköping (J10) when it, among the breaking waves at Bogskär south of Åland, in full storm salvaged a life raft belonging to the German steamer Casablanca.

Lindgren served as a cadet officer at the Royal Swedish Naval Academy from 1943 to 1946 and studied at the Royal Swedish Naval Staff College from 1947 to 1949. He then served in the Naval Staff in 1949 and undertook combat control studies in the Royal Navy in 1951. Lindgren served aboard the destroyer HSwMS Uppland (J17) in 1952 and then in the Naval Staff from 1952 to 1953 and then as flag lieutenant (flaggadjutant) in the staff of the Commander-in-Chief of the Coastal Fleet from 1954 to 1957. Lindgren served as ADC to Prince Bertil, Duke of Halland from 1954. He was promoted to commander and appointed first lieutenant (sekond) on HSwMS Älvsnabben (M01) in 1957 on its trip around South America 1957–58. He then served in the Naval Command West from 1958 to 1959.

Lindgren was captain of the destroyer HSwMS Småland (J19) from 1959 to 1961 and he attended the Swedish National Defence College in 1961. From 1962 to 1966, Lindgren was a teacher at the Swedish National Defence College, after which the sea service was terminated in 1966–67 with the commanding of Älvsnabben during its round-the-world trip with the then Crown Prince Carl Gustaf as officer candidate on board. After returning home, Lindgren served at the Arms Department of the Naval Staff for two years. In 1969, Lindgren was promoted to captain and he then served as a naval attaché at the Embassy of Sweden, Washington, D.C., from 1969 to 1974 and as a military attaché at the Embassy of Sweden, Copenhagen from 1976 to 1979. He was head of the Swedish Auxiliary Naval Corps from 1975 to 1979 when he retired.

He was honorary secretary of the Swedish British Society from 1976 to 1992.

== Personal life ==
In 1943, Lindgren married Mai Albertini (1921–1967), the daughter of Gunnar Albertini and Sonja (née Lindholm). They had three children; Peter (born 1944), Jan (born 1947) and Suzanne (born 1950).

In 1969, he married Marianne Hallberg (born 1924), the daughter of ryttmästare Ernst Hallberg and Elsie (née Winck).

== Death ==
Lindgren died on 25 February 2013 and was buried on 14 June 2013 in Djursholm Cemetery.

== Dates of rank ==
- 1943 – Sub-lieutenant
- 1948 – Lieutenant
- 1957 – Lieutenant commander
- 1962 – Commander
- 1969 – Captain

== Awards and decorations ==
- (Sweden) Knight of the Order of the Sword (1959)
- (Brazil) Officer of the Order of Naval Merit
- (United Kingdom) Knight 1st Class of the Royal Victorian Order
- (Pahlavi dynasty) Knight of the Order of Homayoun

== Honours ==
- Member of the Royal Swedish Society of Naval Sciences (1958)
