= HSwMS Älvsnabben =

Minelayer warship of the Swedish Navy

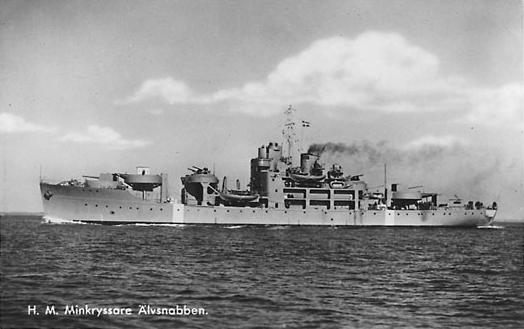
- HSwMS Älvsnabben

History

Sweden
- Name: Älvsnabben
- Launched: 19 January 1943
- Acquired: 1943
- Out of service: 30 June 1982
- Reclassified: Cadet training vessel
- Identification: Pennant number: M01
- Fate: Broken up in Karlskrona
- Badge

General characteristics
- Class & type: Minelayer
- Length: 96.8 m (317 ft 7 in)/102.0 m (334 ft 8 in)
- Beam: 13.5 m (44 ft 3 in)
- Draught: 5.8 m (19 ft 0 in)
- Installed power: 3,000 hp (2,200 kW)
- Propulsion: 1 × Burmeister & Wain diesel; Single shaft
- Speed: 14 knots (26 km/h; 16 mph)
- Crew: 265
- Armament: 4 × 6-inch guns (not used in later years); 8 × 40 mm Bofors; 6 × 20 mm; Depth charges; 380 mines

HSwMS Älvsnabben (M01) was a minelayer of the Swedish Navy. She was built as a freighter, but was requisitioned by the Swedish Navy in 1943.

A single screw and good fuel economy meant that she was used as the cadet training vessel of the Swedish Navy for a number of years, and she travelled the globe multiple times.

== Captains ==
- 1949–1951: Fredrik Taube
- 1951–1952: Magnus Starck
- 1953–1954: Oscar Krokstedt
- 1954–1955: Willy Edenberg
- 1956–1957: Anders Nilsson
- 1957–1957: Bengt Lundvall
- 1957–1958: Fredrik Taube
- 1958–1959: Gunnar Norström
- 1959–1960: B. Hedlund
- 1961–1962: Yngve Rollof
- 1962–1963: Ulf Eklind
- 1963–1964: K.K. Berggren
- 1964–1965: Anders Låftman
- 1965–1966: Nils Rydström
- 1966–1967: Lennart Lindgren
- 1967–1968: Lennart Ahrén
- 1968–1968: Christer Fredholm
- 1968–1969: Bengt Odin
- 1969–1969: Christer Fredholm
- 1969–1970: Per Broman
- 1970–1971: Victor Tornérhjelm
- 1971–1972: Torsten Malm
- 1972–1973: Rolf Nerpin
- 1973–1974: K. Ekman
- 1974–1975: Hans Tynnerström
- 1975–1976: Nils Hellström
- 1976–1977: Ulf Samuelsson
- 1977–1978: Bertil Daggfeldt
- 1978–1979: Roderick Klintebo
- 1979–1980: Carl-Gustaf Hammarskjöld
