= Vegard Robinson Bugge =

Norwegian cyclist

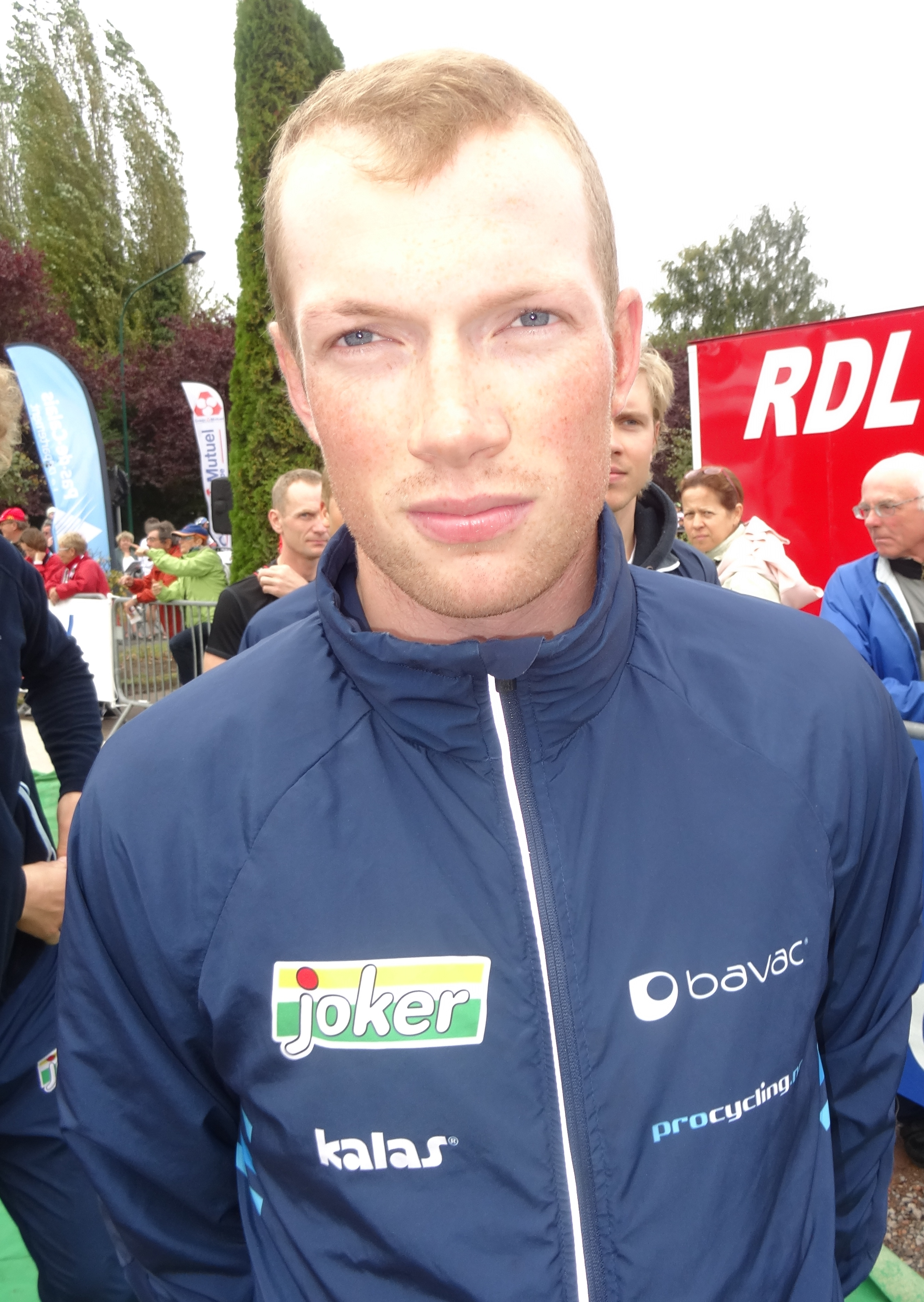
- Robinson Bugge in 2014

Personal information
- Full name: Vegard Robinson Bugge
- Born: 7 December 1989 (age 36) Horten, Norway

Cycling career
- Sport: Cycling
- Current team: Retired
- Discipline: Road
- Role: Rider

Amateur teams
- 2007: Horten OCK
- 2008–2009: SK Raumerrytter
- 2009: Team Designa Køkken (stagiaire)
- 2016: SK Raumerrytter

Professional teams
- 2010–2014: Joker–Bianchi
- 2015: Team Sparebanken Sør

Vegard Robinson Bugge (born 7 December 1989 in Horten) is a Norwegian former professional cyclist.

== Major results ==
2007
3rd Time trial, National Junior Road Championships
2009
3rd Road race, National Under-23 Road Championships
2010
2nd Road race, National Under-23 Road Championships
8th Rogaland Grand Prix
2011
1st Road race, National Under-23 Road Championships
3rd Overall Tour of Norway
6th Ronde van Vlaanderen U23
2012
5th Overall Ronde de l'Oise
2013
1st Gooikse Pijl
2014
10th Overall Tour de Bretagne
2015
1st Mountains classification Tour of Norway
4th GP Horsens
