= HSwMS Najaden (1897) =

Swedish Navy training ship

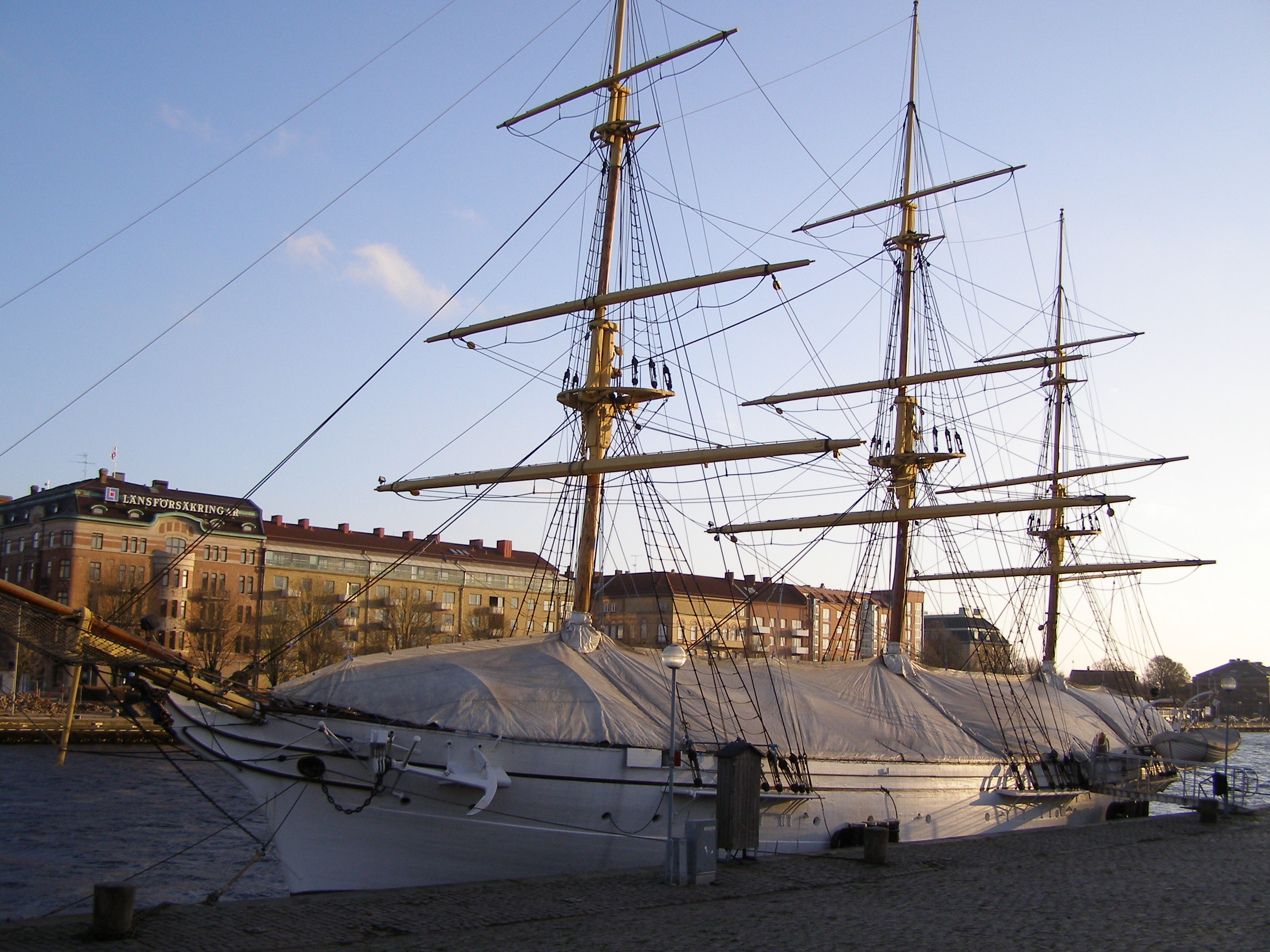

History

Sweden
- Name: Najaden
- Launched: 11 February 1897
- Decommissioned: 1938
- Status: Museum ship
- Notes: Sister ship of HMS Jarramas

General characteristics
- Sail plan: Full-rigged ship

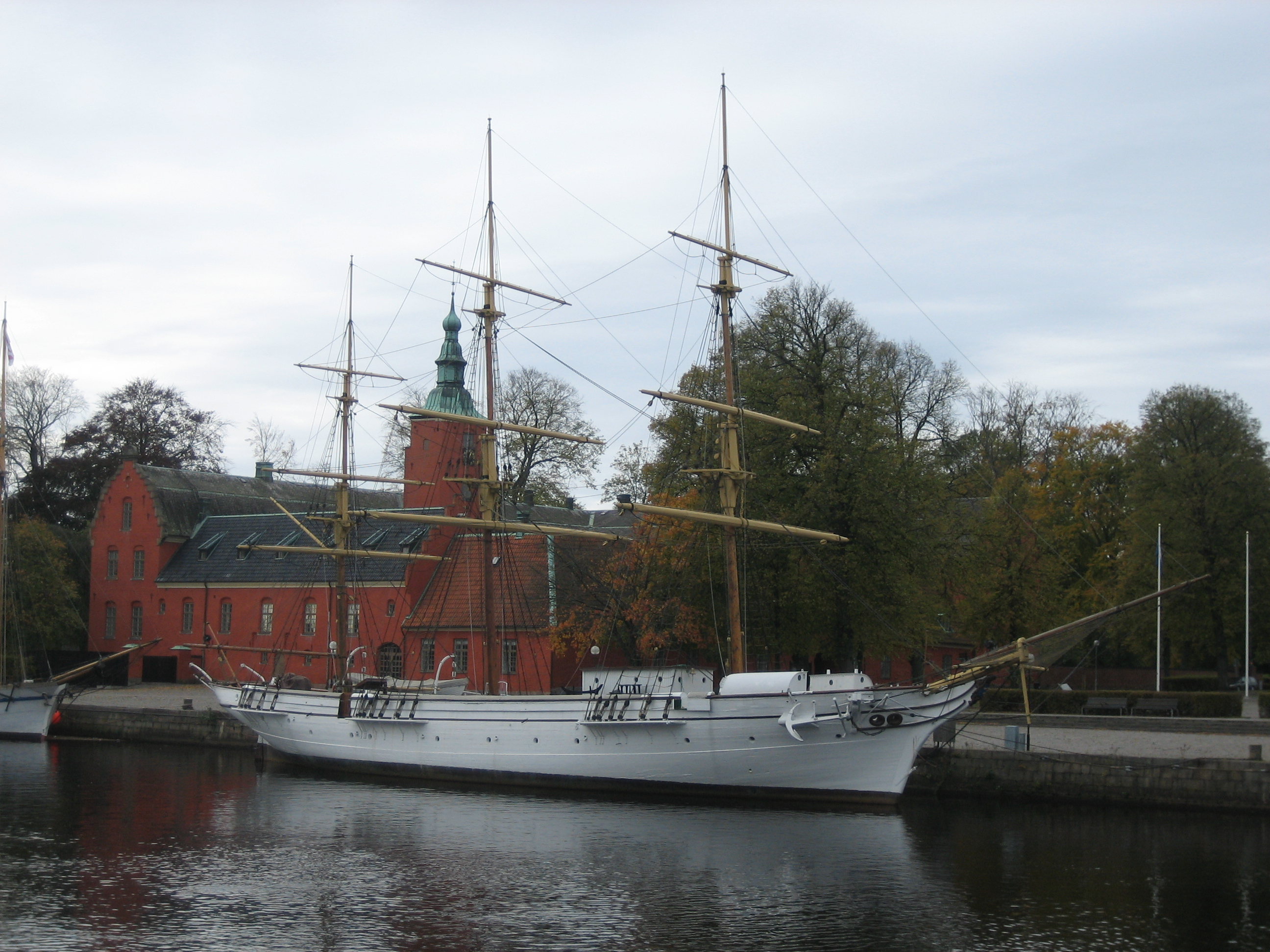
HSwMS Najaden

HSwMS Najaden is a Swedish Navy training ship launched in 1897, previously preserved as a museum ship in Halmstad and moored on the river Nissan by Halmstad Castle, since July 2014 in Fredrikstad, Norway.

The three-masted, wooden hulled sailing ship was constructed at the Royal Naval Shipyard in Karlskrona in 1897 and served in the Swedish Navy as a sail training ship until 1938.

In 1946 she was taken over by the city of Halmstad and completely restored. She now serves as a museum ship and is in the care of the Association of the Friends of Najaden (Föreningen Najadens Vänner).

Najaden passed into Norwegian ownership on Friday, 4 July 2014. A brief ceremony led by the city council's chairman, Conservative Ann-Charlotte Westlund was held in front of Najaden in central Halmstad. At that time, about 200 protesters demonstrated against the sale of the ship to Norway.

On Saturday, 5 July 2014, Najaden was towed from Halmstad to its new home port in Fredrikstad, Norway. The sail training ship af Chapman was a contemporary of Najaden in Swedish Navy service.

== See also ==
- List of museum ships
- List of ships of the Swedish Navy
- List of large sailing vessels
- Tall Ships Races
