= Mark Sehested Pedersen =

Danish cyclist

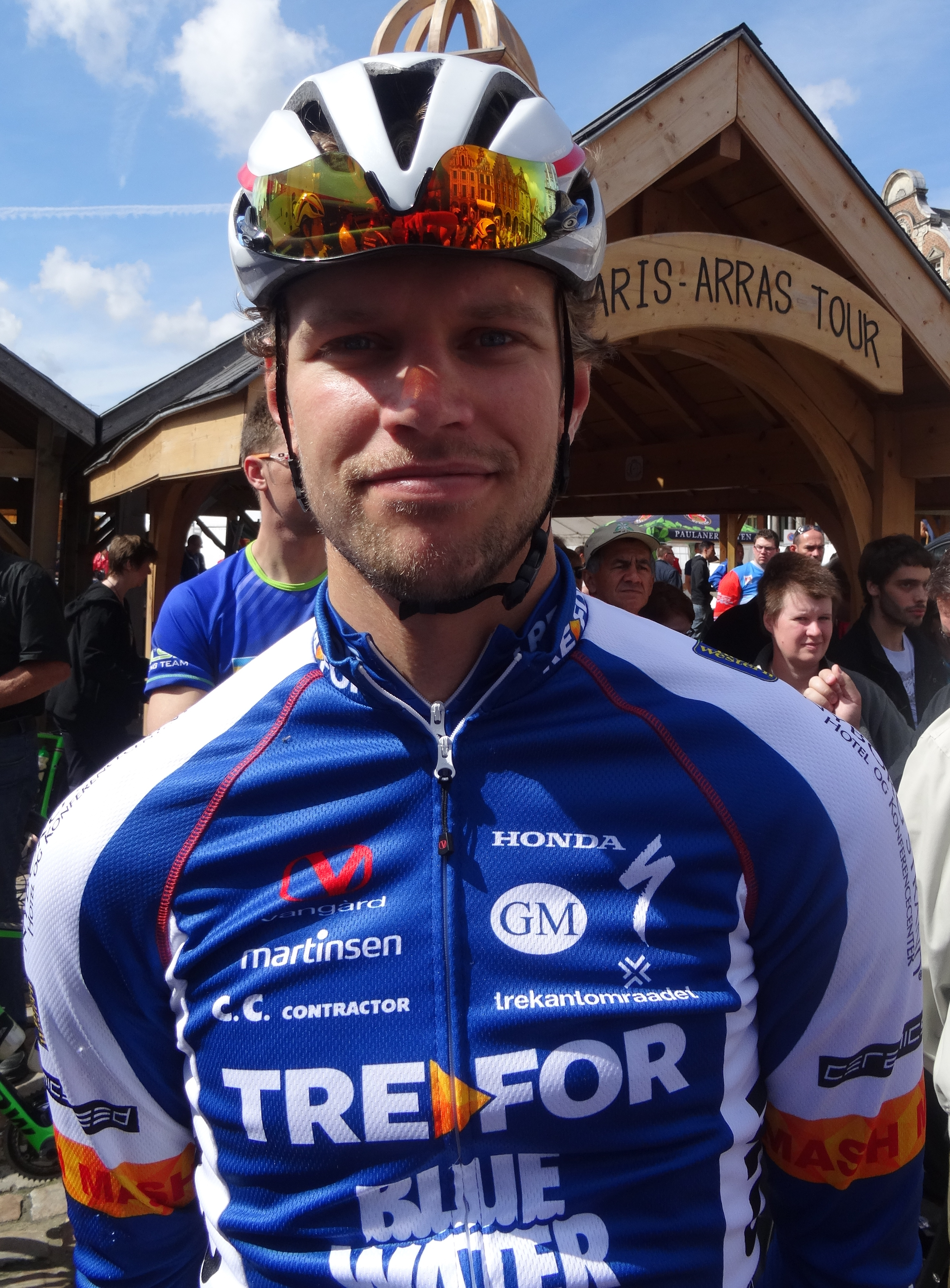
- Sehested Pedersen in 2014

Personal information
- Born: 6 November 1991 (age 34) Kalundborg, Denmark

Cycling career
- Sport: Cycling
- Current team: Retired
- Discipline: Road
- Role: Rider

Amateur teams
- 2010: Reelight–Cube
- 2011: BikeToyz U23 Racing

Professional teams
- 2012–2013: Blue Water Cycling
- 2014–2017: Team TreFor–Blue Water

Mark Sehested Pedersen (born 6 November 1991 in Kalundborg) is a Danish former professional cyclist.

== Major results ==
2012
1st Stage 4 Rás Tailteann
2013
5th Tour of Nanjing
2015
3rd Overall Tour of Yancheng Coastal Wetlands
9th GP Viborg
2017
10th International Rhodes Grand Prix
