= Lindegren =

Lindegren is a Swedish surname. Notable people with the surname include:

- Arthur Lindegren (1911–1981), American swimmer
- Erik Lindegren (1910–1968), Swedish author, poet, and member of the Swedish Academy
- Yrjö Lindegren (1900–1952), Finnish architect

== See also ==
- Lindgren, surname
