= Robert Lindgren =

American lawyer and educator

15th president of Randolph-Macon College
- Incumbent
- Assumed office 2006
- Preceded by: Roger H. Martin

Personal details
- Children: 3
- Education: University of Florida (B.A., JD); Brasenose College, Oxford (M.A.)
- Occupation: Administrator, Attorney

Robert R. Lindgren is an academic administrator, and the 15th president of Randolph-Macon College.

== Early life and education ==
Lindgren was born and raised in Muskegon, Michigan.

Lindgren graduated Omicron Delta Kappa from the University of Florida in 1976. Lindgren earned his J.D. degree from the Levin College of Law at UF in 1981 and a master of philosophy degree from Oxford University in 1978.

== Career ==
Lindgren became interested in higher education administration after he started working in the office of University of Florida President Robert Marston. In 1980, while Lindgren was still in law school, he was asked to organize a fundraising campaign for the law school. He did not pursue practicing law, and instead began a career in fundraising and development, first for the Levin College of Law and then for the University of Florida. The $400 million raised during his 1985 campaign was the 3rd largest campaign ever completed by a public university at the time.

Lindgren served as vice president of development and alumni relations at Johns Hopkins from 1994 to 2005. The first fundraising campaign he led reached its initial goal two years early and went on to record $1.52 billion in gifts, the fifth largest campaign ever in higher education at that time. The second campaign had reached nearly $1.9 billion in commitments when he departed the university.

Randolph-Macon’s choice of Lindgren as its 15th president, in 2005, was noted as part of a trend toward colleges and universities hiring presidents with fundraising experience. Lindgren’s tenure has been noted for his success in engaging alumni and raising funds to build new programs and buildings.

In 2018, Randolph-Macon completed a $125 million fundraising campaign, which included building a $17.5 million science building. It was named for the college’s major donor, the late Macon F. Brock Jr., a member of the class of RMC 1964 and co-founder of Dollar Tree

Under Lindgren’s leadership, the liberal arts curriculum of Randolph-Macon grew to include health sciences, including a bachelor's degree in nursing and a graduate degree in physician assistant studies. The college also added an engineering degree.

Lindgren has chaired the Council of Independent Colleges Virginia and the Virginia United Methodist Conference’s Association of Educational Institutions. In July 2010, he was appointed to Gov. Bob McDonnell’s Commission on Higher Education Reform, Innovation and Investment, which was tasked with recommending ways to improve college affordability, increase higher education attainability in Virginia and increase the number of students studying science, technology, engineering and math.

== Personal life ==
Lindgren is married to Cheryl Lindgren. They have three adult children.
