= Blue Water Cycling =

Danish cycling team

Blue Water Cycling AKA BWC
Team information
- UCI code: BWC
- Registered: Denmark
- Founded: 2009
- Discipline: Road
- Status: UCI Continental
- Bicycles: Specialized

Key personnel
- Team manager: Brian Buchanan

Blue Water Cycling is a Danish road cycling team that was formed in 2009 as a merger between Herning CK and Team Løgstør-Cycling for Health. It is currently a UCI Continental Team, competing on the UCI Europe Tour. For the 2012 season, the team's riders are exclusively Danish.

The two most successful members of the team are Rasmus Quaade, who has won Danish national road titles five times (though only once with Blue Water), and Lasse Norman Hansen, who competed at the 2012 Summer Olympics, winning a gold medal in the men's omnium and placing fifth in the team pursuit.

== Major wins ==
2012
Stage 4 Rás Tailteann: Mark Sehested
Stage 7 Rás Tailteann: Lasse Norman Hansen
Men's Omnium Olympic Games, Lasse Norman Hansen
2013
GP Herning, Lasse Norman Hansen
Rund um den Finanzplatz Eschborn-Frankfurt U23, Lasse Norman Hansen
Overall Tour de Berlin, Mathias Møller

Stage 2 (ITT), Lasse Norman Hansen

Danish National Under-23 Time Trial Championships, Lasse Norman Hansen
Danish National Under-23 Road Race Championships, Lasse Norman Hansen
Stage 1a (ITT) Tour de Slovaquie, Mathias Møller

== Team roster ==
As of 29 January 2013.

Rider	Date of birth
Daniel Foder (DEN)	7 April 1983 (age 43)
Rasmus Guldhammer (DEN)	9 March 1989 (age 37)
Lasse Norman Hansen (DEN)	11 February 1992 (age 34)
Christian Jensen (DEN)	5 March 1992 (age 34)
Jacob Kjeldsen (DEN)	3 February 1982 (age 44)
Mathias Møller (DEN)	19 March 1994 (age 32)
Jacob Nielsen (DEN)	12 January 1978 (age 48)

Rider	Date of birth
Morten Øllegaard (DEN)	6 February 1988 (age 38)
Søren Pugdahl (DEN)	17 October 1987 (age 38)
Thomas Riis (DEN)	31 August 1992 (age 34)
Mark Sehested (DEN)	6 November 1991 (age 34)
Frederik Thalund (DEN)	9 February 1993 (age 33)
Aske Vorre (DEN)	24 May 1993 (age 33)

== See also ==
- Cycling at the 2012 Summer Olympics
- Cycling at the 2012 Summer Olympics – Men's omnium
