= Sandgren =

Sandgren is a surname. Notable people with the surname include:

- Åke Sandgren (born 1955), Swedish-Danish film director and screenwriter
- August Sandgren (1893–1934), Danish bookbinder
- Gunnar Sandgren (1929–2016), Swedish novelist and playwright
- Gustav Sandgren (1904–1983), Swedish author
- Jacob Sandgren (born 1973), Swedish politician
- Linus Sandgren (born 1972), Swedish cinematographer
- Tennys Sandgren (born 1991), American professional tennis player
