= Sundgren =

Sundgren is a surname. Notable people with the surname include:

- Christian Fandango Sundgren, Swedish actor who plays Christoffer Olsen in A Nearly Normal Family
- Christoffer Sundgren (born 1989), Swedish curler
- Daniel Sundgren (born 1990), Swedish footballer
- Gary Sundgren (born 1967), Swedish footballer
- Jan-Eric Sundgren (born 1951), Swedish engineer and businessman
- Nils Petter Sundgren (1929–2019), Swedish film critic and television presenter
