= Mathias Møller Nielsen =

Danish cyclist (born 1994)

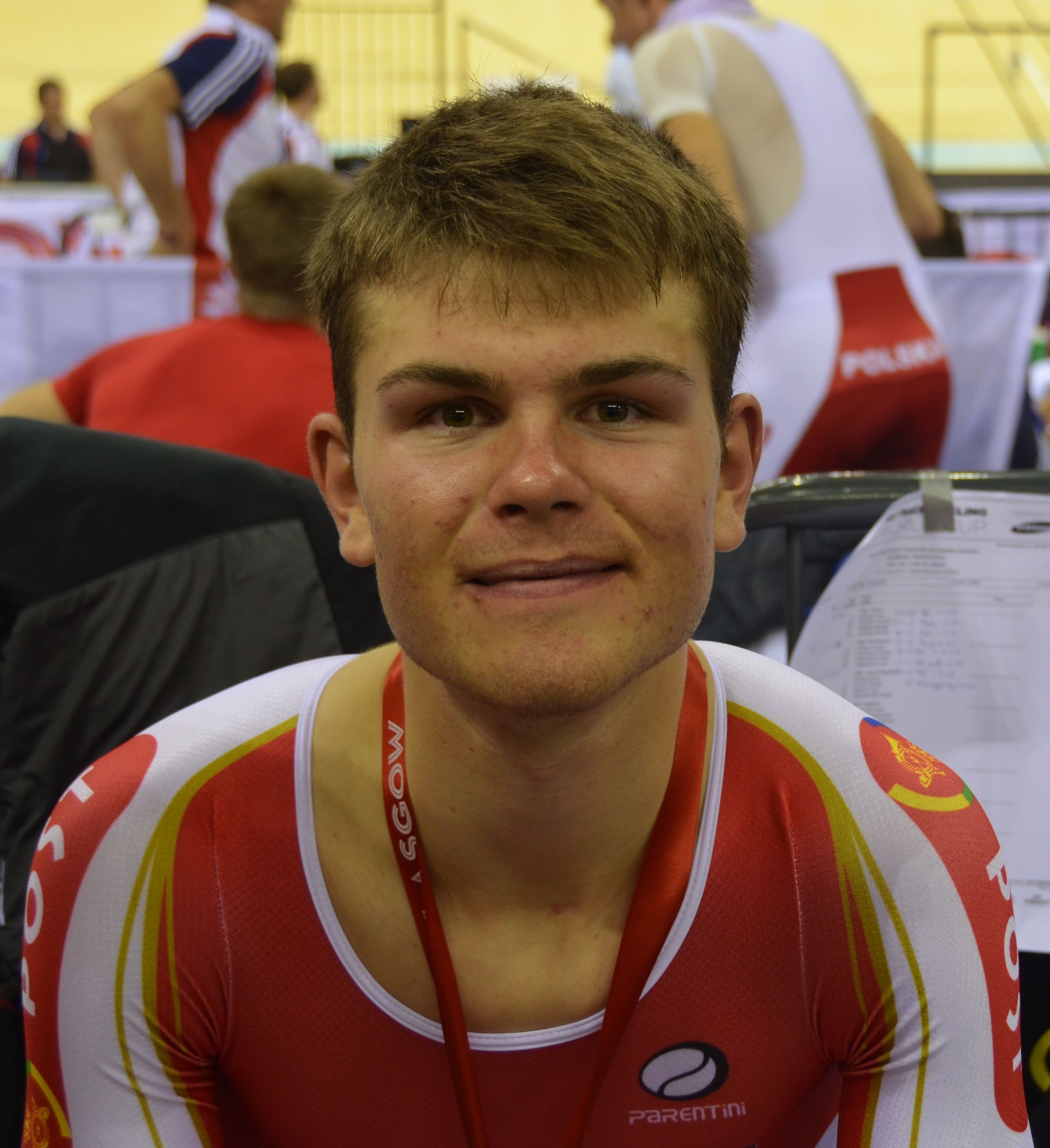
- Danish amateur road and track cyclist

Personal information
- Full name: Mathias Møller Nielsen
- Born: 19 March 1994 (age 32) Gentofte, Denmark
- Height: 1.90 m (6 ft 3 in)
- Weight: 79 kg (174 lb)

Cycling career
- Sport: Cycling
- Disciplines: Road, track
- Role: Rider
- Rider type: Pursuit

Amateur teams
- 2013: Blue Water Cycling
- 2014: Team TreFor–Blue Water
- 2016: Team TreFor
Medal record
Men's track cycling
Representing Denmark
| Gold medal – first place | 2012 Anadia | Team pursuit |

Mathias Møller Nielsen (born 19 March 1994 in Gentofte) is a Danish amateur road and track cyclist. He helped his Danish squad claim a gold medal in the men's junior team pursuit at the 2012 European Track Cycling Championships in Anadia, Portugal, and later represented his nation Denmark at the Summer Olympics in London. At the peak of his early sporting career, Nielsen currently rides for the Blue Water Cycling Team and Team Trefor-Blue Water.

Nielsen qualified for the Danish squad in the men's team pursuit at the 2012 Summer Olympics in London based on the nation's selection process from the UCI Track World Rankings. He and his teammates Michael Mørkøv, Rasmus Quaade, and Casper von Folsach surpassed the Spaniards by a short distance gap for a fifth-place finish in their final match at 4:02.671.

== Career highlights ==
2011
National Junior Track Championships, Ballerup

2nd Team pursuit
3rd Madison

9th National Junior Time Trial Championships
2012
(gold) European Under-23 Track Championships (Team pursuit), Anadia (POR)
(gold) UCI World Cup (Team pursuit), Glasgow (GBR)
2nd National Junior Track Championships (Team pursuit), Ballerup
2013
1st Overall, Tour of Berlin U23, Berlin (GER)
1st Stage 1, Tour of Slovakia, Košice (SVK)
