= John Lundgren =

John Lundgren may refer to:

- John Lundgren (cyclist) (born 1940), Danish cyclist
- John Lundgren (baritone) (born 1968), Swedish baritone opera singer
- John F. Lundgren, CEO and chairman of Stanley Black & Decker, 2004–2016
