= Thomas Riis =

Danish cyclist

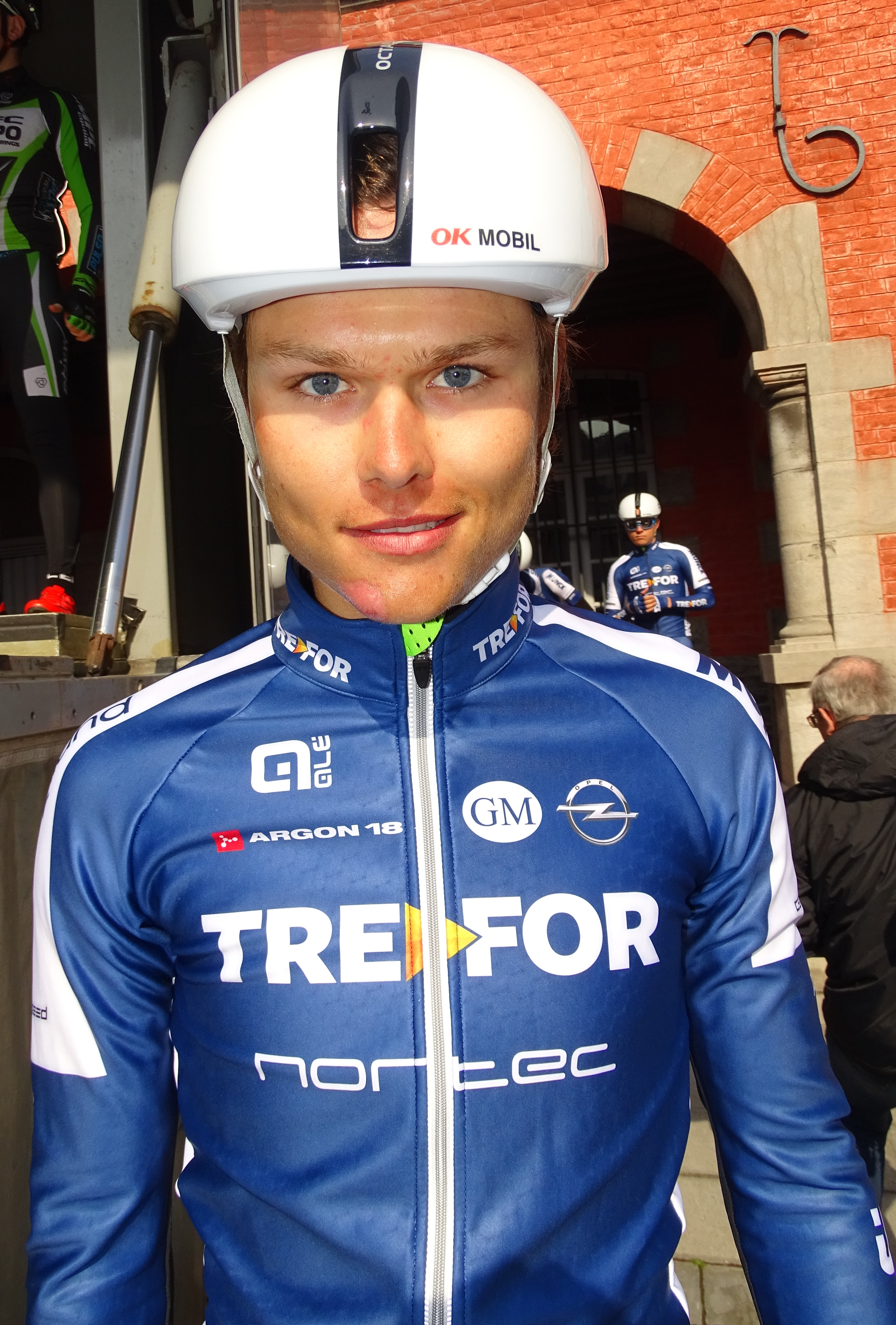
Thomas Riis

Thomas Nybo Riis (born 31 August 1992) is a Danish cyclist.

Riis started with competitive cycling in 2010 and in just over a year he rose to compete among the best Danish amateurs in the A Class. In 2011 he took part in the Tour of Denmark as the youngest participant. He took part in the Italian stage race Giro della Lunigiana as a member of an English team. He signed a contract with Team Blue Water Cycling in 2012.

Thomas Riis lives in Silkeborg and is the son of Bjarne Riis of his first marriage with Mette Nybo Riis.
