= Alexander Lindgren =

Swedish ice hockey player (born 1993)

- Born: 1993 (age 31–32) Stockholm, Sweden
- Height: 6 ft 0 in (183 cm)
- Weight: 192 lb (87 kg; 13 st 10 lb)
- Position: Forward
- Shot: Left
- Played for: Brynäs IF
- Playing career: 2012–2015

Alexander Lindgren (born 1993) is a Swedish former professional ice hockey player. He made his Elitserien debut playing with Brynäs IF during the 2012–13 Elitserien season. During the course of his career, he played in 86 Swedish Hockey League games and 20 in the Allsvenskan league. Lindgren was forced to retire in late 2015 due to a concussion suffered while playing in the HockeyAllsvenskan with Timrå IK. After his retirement, he worked at a company in Gävle.

== Career statistics ==
| | | | Regular season | | | | | Playoffs |
| Season | Team | League | GP | G | A | Pts | PIM | GP | G | A | Pts | PIM |
|---|---|---|---|---|---|---|---|---|---|---|---|---|
| 2010–11 | Brynäs IF | J20 | 13 | 3 | 1 | 4 | 4 | — | — | — | — | — |
| 2011–12 | Brynäs IF | J20 | 43 | 9 | 30 | 39 | 16 | 2 | 0 | 0 | 0 | 2 |
| 2012–13 | Brynäs IF | J20 | 32 | 9 | 27 | 36 | 14 | 2 | 0 | 0 | 0 | 0 |
| 2012–13 | Brynäs IF | SEL | 24 | 0 | 2 | 2 | 6 | 2 | 0 | 0 | 0 | 2 |
| 2013–14 | Brynäs IF | SHL | 33 | 1 | 3 | 4 | 0 | 5 | 0 | 0 | 0 | 0 |
| 2013–14 | Almtuna IS | Allsv | 1 | 0 | 0 | 0 | 0 | — | — | — | — | — |
| 2014–15 | Brynäs IF | J20 | 1 | 1 | 2 | 3 | 0 | — | — | — | — | — |
| 2014–15 | Brynäs IF | SHL | 29 | 1 | 2 | 3 | 2 | — | — | — | — | — |
| 2015–16 | Timrå IK | Allsv | 19 | 1 | 6 | 7 | 4 | — | — | — | — | — |
| SHL totals | | | 86 | 2 | 7 | 9 | 8 | 7 | 0 | 0 | 0 | 2 |
