= Daniel Foder =

Danish cyclist

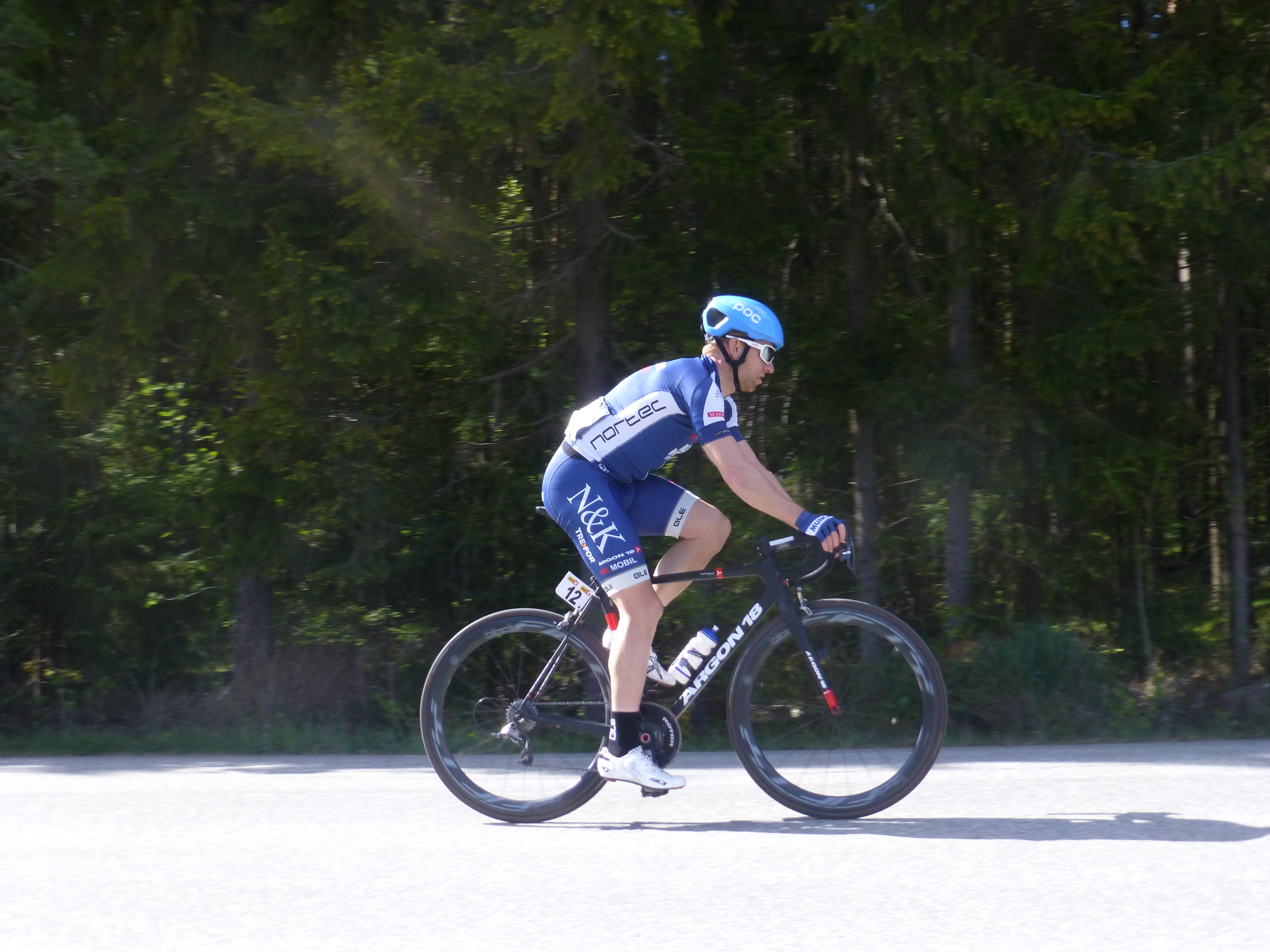
- Foder in 2015

Personal information
- Full name: Daniel Foder Holm
- Born: 7 April 1983 (age 43)

Cycling career
- Sport: Cycling
- Current team: Retired
- Discipline: Road
- Role: Rider

Professional teams
- 2005–2007: Team Designa Køkken
- 2008: Team Løgstør–Cycling for Health
- 2009–2010: Concordia–Vesthimmerland
- 2011: Glud & Marstrand–LRØ
- 2012: Christina Watches–Onfone
- 2013: Blue Water Cycling
- 2014–2016: Team TreFor–Blue Water

Daniel Foder Holm (born 7 April 1983) is a Danish former professional cyclist.

== Major results ==
2008
1st GP Nordjylland
2009
1st Fyen Rundt
4th Ringerike GP
2011
1st Team time trial, National Road Championships
2nd Overall Tour of Norway
3rd Rogaland GP
2012
4th Overall Tour of China I

1st Stage 1 (TTT)
