= Peter Lindgren (business theorist) =

Peter Lindgren (born Dec 1, 1961) is a Danish organizational theorist, and Professor at Aarhus University's Department of Business and Technology, known for his research involving firms' business models, including about interdependence of partner firms' business models and about innovation.

== Biography ==
Lindgren grew up in Skive, Denmark, where he attending the Skive Gymnasium from 1977 to 1980. In 1983 he obtained his BA in Business Administration at the Copenhagen Business School, and his MA in Business Administration at the Aarhus School of Business in 1985. In 2003 he obtained his PhD in engineering at the Aalborg University – Copenhagen with a thesis on Network Based High Speed Innovation.

Lindgren started his career in industry as sales assistant in 1985, was Regional Export Manager for a year, and manager for a web-store selling electronic components for three year. He was Marketing Manager for Novopan Treeindustri from 1990 to 1993, before he returned to the academic world. From 1993 to 1999 he worked at the Aarhus School of Business in various functions. In 1999 he moved to the Aalborg University, where he was appointed Associate Professor at the Department of Mechanical engineering and Manufacturing, and since 2014 has been a full professor.

== Work ==
=== Business modelling ===
The OMG (2011) acknowledged:

A business model describes how an organization creates, captures, delivers, receives and consumes value from the perspective of primary stakeholders. Peter Lindgren defines seven building blocks of a business model: value proposition, user and consumer, value chain, competencies, network, relations and value formula, Lindgren (2011).

Lindgren depicted these dimensions into a so-called "Business Model Cube".

== Selected publications ==
- Lindgren, Peter, ed. NEW global ICT-based business models. River Publishers, 2011.

Articles, a selection:

- Lindgren, Peter, Yariv Taran, and Harry Boer. "From single firm to network-based business model innovation." International Journal of Entrepreneurship and Innovation Management 12.2 (2010): 122-137.
- Lindgren, P., and Y. Taran. "A Futuristic outlook on business models and business model innovation in a future green society." Journal of Green Engineering 2 (2011): 1-10.
- Lindgren, Peter. "Business Model Innovation Leadership: How Do SME’s Strategically Lead Business Model Innovation?." International Journal of Business and Management 7.14 (2012): p53.
- Lindgren, Peter, and Ole Horn Rasmussen. "The business model cube." Journal of Multi Business Model Innovation and Technology 1.2 (2013): 135-182.
