= TET =

3 week internship program in Sweden and Finland

TET or PRAO (Työelämään tutustuminen in Finnish, Praktisk arbetslivsorientering in Swedish, lit. work-life orientation) is a program providing workplace experience to middle school (lower secondary education) students in Finland and Sweden.

The program is one to three weeks long, and takes place in 7th, 8th or 9th grade, depending on the school. Students can choose and apply for positions independently, and sign contracts with both the school and the employer. In practice, students often end up working with a relative or friend.

Students working in the program receive no salary. Lunch can be provided by the employer, a local school, or bought by the student to be reimbursed later. Costs incurred by the employer are reimbursed by the state.

The purpose of the program is to introduce students to real-life working environments. TET students normally have a six-hour workday, with only one mandatory 30-minute lunch break. For safety reasons, laws and regulations prohibit minors from doing certain types of work.

== See also ==
- Community service
- Internship
- Work experience
