= Johan Lindgren =

Swedish cyclist

Personal information
- Full name: Johan Lindgren
- Born: August 13, 1986 (age 40)
- Height: 1.73 m (5 ft 8 in)
- Weight: 68 kg (150 lb)

Cycling career
- Sport: Cycling
- Discipline: Road
- Role: Rider

Amateur team
- 2008–2010: Team Cykelcity

Professional teams
- 2007: Française des Jeux
- 2011: Team Cykelcity

Johan Lindgren (born August 13, 1986) is a Swedish professional road bicycle racer. He was professional for just one season in the ProTour in 2007 for UCI ProTeam Française des Jeux, later joining Team Cykelcity for four seasons.

== Palmarès ==
- Sweden U19 Road Race Champion (2004)
  - 2nd (2003)
