= 2018 Tour de Luxembourg =

2018 UCI Europe Tour

Race details
- Dates: 30 May – 3 June 2018
- Stages: 5
- Distance: 618.0 km (384.0 mi)
- Winning time: 14h 31' 33"

Results
Jersey awarded to the overall winner	Winner	Andrea Pasqualon (ITA)	(Wanty–Groupe Gobert)
	Second	Jan Tratnik (SLO)	(CCC–Sprandi–Polkowice)
	Third	Pit Leyder (LUX)	(Leopard Pro Cycling)
Jersey awarded to the points classification winner	Points	Andrea Pasqualon (ITA)	(Wanty–Groupe Gobert)
Jersey awarded to the mountains classification winner	Mountains	Mauro Finetto (ITA)	(Delko–Marseille Provence KTM)
Jersey awarded to the youth classification winner	Youth	Pit Leyder (LUX)	(Leopard Pro Cycling)
	Team	Sport Vlaanderen–Baloise	

The 2018 Tour de Luxembourg was the 78th edition of the Tour de Luxembourg road cycling stage race. It was held between 30 May and 3 June, as a 2.HC event as part of the 2018 UCI Europe Tour.

== Schedule ==
Stage characteristics and winners
Stage	Date	Route	Distance	Type	Winner
P	30 May	Luxembourg City to Luxembourg City	2.3 km (1.4 mi)	Individual time trial	Damien Gaudin (FRA)
1	31 May	Luxembourg City to Hesperange	186.7 km (116.0 mi)	Flat stage	Christophe Laporte (FRA)
2	1 June	Junglinster to Schifflange	89.2 km (55.4 mi)	Flat stage	Andrea Pasqualon (ITA)
3	2 June	Eschweiler to Differdange	163.8 km (101.8 mi)	Hilly stage	Andrea Pasqualon (ITA)
4	3 June	Mersch to Luxembourg City	176 km (109 mi)	Hilly stage	Anthony Perez (FRA)
Total		618.0 km (384.0 mi)			

== Teams ==
Ten UCI Professional Continental teams and five UCI Continental teams made up the fifteen teams that participated the race. Each team entered seven riders, except for Vérandas Willems–Crelan and Wanty–Groupe Gobert, which each entered six, for a starting peloton of 103 riders. Of these riders, only 84 finished the race.

UCI Professional Continental Teams

- CCC–Sprandi–Polkowice
- Cofidis
- Delko–Marseille Provence KTM
- Direct Énergie
- Euskadi–Murias
- Roompot–Nederlandse Loterij
- Sport Vlaanderen–Baloise
- Vérandas Willems–Crelan
- Wanty–Groupe Gobert
- WB Aqua Protect Veranclassic

UCI Continental Teams

- Bike Aid
- Differdange–Losch
- Leopard Pro Cycling
- Team Lotto–Kern Haus
- Team Vorarlberg Santic

== Stages ==
=== Prologue ===
30 May 2018 — Luxembourg City to Luxembourg City, 2.3 km (1.4 mi) (ITT)

Prologue Result
Rank	Rider	Team	Time
1	Damien Gaudin (FRA)	Direct Énergie	3' 16"
2	Alexander Krieger (GER)	Leopard Pro Cycling	+ 1"
3	Jan Tratnik (SLO)	CCC–Sprandi–Polkowice	+ 3"
4	Adrien Petit (FRA)	Direct Énergie	+ 4"
5	Jonathan Hivert (FRA)	Direct Énergie	+ 5"
6	Sean De Bie (BEL)	Vérandas Willems–Crelan	+ 6"
7	Aimé De Gendt (BEL)	Sport Vlaanderen–Baloise	+ 8"
8	Alex Kirsch (LUX)	WB Aqua Protect Veranclassic	+ 8"
9	Piet Allegaert (BEL)	Sport Vlaanderen–Baloise	+ 8"
10	Benjamin Declercq (BEL)	Sport Vlaanderen–Baloise	+ 8"

General classification after Prologue
Rank	Rider	Team	Time
1	Damien Gaudin (FRA)	Direct Énergie	3' 16"
2	Alexander Krieger (GER)	Leopard Pro Cycling	+ 1"
3	Jan Tratnik (SLO)	CCC–Sprandi–Polkowice	+ 3"
4	Adrien Petit (FRA)	Direct Énergie	+ 4"
5	Jonathan Hivert (FRA)	Direct Énergie	+ 5"
6	Sean De Bie (BEL)	Vérandas Willems–Crelan	+ 6"
7	Aimé De Gendt (BEL)	Sport Vlaanderen–Baloise	+ 8"
8	Alex Kirsch (LUX)	WB Aqua Protect Veranclassic	+ 8"
9	Piet Allegaert (BEL)	Sport Vlaanderen–Baloise	+ 8"
10	Benjamin Declercq (BEL)	Sport Vlaanderen–Baloise	+ 8"

=== Stage 1 ===
31 May 2018 — Luxembourg City to Hesperange, 186.7 km (116.0 mi)

Stage 1 Result
Rank	Rider	Team	Time
1	Christophe Laporte (FRA)	Cofidis	4h 39' 58"
2	Alex Kirsch (LUX)	WB Aqua Protect Veranclassic	+ 0"
3	Andrea Pasqualon (ITA)	Wanty–Groupe Gobert	+ 0"
4	Enrique Sanz (ESP)	Euskadi–Murias	+ 0"
5	Alexander Krieger (GER)	Leopard Pro Cycling	+ 0"
6	Justin Jules (FRA)	WB Aqua Protect Veranclassic	+ 0"
7	Adrien Petit (FRA)	Direct Énergie	+ 0"
8	Brenton Jones (AUS)	Delko–Marseille Provence KTM	+ 0"
9	Jannik Steimle (GER)	Team Vorarlberg Santic	+ 0"
10	Sean De Bie (BEL)	Vérandas Willems–Crelan	+ 0"

General classification after Stage 1
Rank	Rider	Team	Time
1	Damien Gaudin (FRA)	Direct Énergie	4h 43' 14"
2	Alexander Krieger (GER)	Leopard Pro Cycling	+ 1"
3	Alex Kirsch (LUX)	WB Aqua Protect Veranclassic	+ 2"
4	Jan Tratnik (SLO)	CCC–Sprandi–Polkowice	+ 3"
5	Adrien Petit (FRA)	Direct Énergie	+ 4"
6	Jonathan Hivert (FRA)	Direct Énergie	+ 5"
7	Sean De Bie (BEL)	Vérandas Willems–Crelan	+ 6"
8	Aimé De Gendt (BEL)	Sport Vlaanderen–Baloise	+ 8"
9	Piet Allegaert (BEL)	Sport Vlaanderen–Baloise	+ 8"
10	Benjamin Declercq (BEL)	Sport Vlaanderen–Baloise	+ 8"

=== Stage 2 ===
1 June 2018 — Junglinster to Schifflange, 89.2 km (55.4 mi)

Stage 2 Result
Rank	Rider	Team	Time
1	Andrea Pasqualon (ITA)	Wanty–Groupe Gobert	1h 57' 29"
2	Alexander Krieger (GER)	Leopard Pro Cycling	+ 0"
3	Alex Kirsch (LUX)	WB Aqua Protect Veranclassic	+ 0"
4	Jan Tratnik (SLO)	CCC–Sprandi–Polkowice	+ 0"
5	Pit Leyder (LUX)	Leopard Pro Cycling	+ 0"
6	Piet Allegaert (BEL)	Sport Vlaanderen–Baloise	+ 0"
7	Mauro Finetto (ITA)	Delko–Marseille Provence KTM	+ 3"
8	Thomas Sprengers (BEL)	Sport Vlaanderen–Baloise	+ 3"
9	Huub Duijn (NED)	Vérandas Willems–Crelan	+ 3"
10	Eduard Prades (ESP)	Euskadi–Murias	+ 5"

General classification after Stage 2
Rank	Rider	Team	Time
1	Alexander Krieger (GER)	Leopard Pro Cycling	6h 40' 38"
2	Alex Kirsch (LUX)	WB Aqua Protect Veranclassic	+ 3"
3	Andrea Pasqualon (ITA)	Wanty–Groupe Gobert	+ 5"
4	Jan Tratnik (SLO)	CCC–Sprandi–Polkowice	+ 8"
5	Piet Allegaert (BEL)	Sport Vlaanderen–Baloise	+ 13"
6	Huub Duijn (NED)	Vérandas Willems–Crelan	+ 16"
7	Pit Leyder (LUX)	Leopard Pro Cycling	+ 17"
8	Thomas Sprengers (BEL)	Sport Vlaanderen–Baloise	+ 17"
9	Benjamin Declercq (BEL)	Sport Vlaanderen–Baloise	+ 20"
10	Aimé De Gendt (BEL)	Sport Vlaanderen–Baloise	+ 22"

=== Stage 3 ===
2 June 2018 — Eschweiler to Differdange, 163.8 km (101.8 mi)

Stage 3 Result
Rank	Rider	Team	Time
1	Andrea Pasqualon (ITA)	Wanty–Groupe Gobert	3h 53' 36"
2	Angelo Tulik (FRA)	Direct Énergie	+ 0"
3	Nick van der Lijke (NED)	Roompot–Nederlandse Loterij	+ 0"
4	Huub Duijn (NED)	Vérandas Willems–Crelan	+ 0"
5	Olivier Pardini (BEL)	Differdange–Losch	+ 0"
6	Julien El Fares (FRA)	Delko–Marseille Provence KTM	+ 0"
7	Eduard Prades (ESP)	Euskadi–Murias	+ 0"
8	Aimé De Gendt (BEL)	Sport Vlaanderen–Baloise	+ 0"
9	Pit Leyder (LUX)	Leopard Pro Cycling	+ 0"
10	Mauro Finetto (ITA)	Delko–Marseille Provence KTM	+ 0"

General classification after Stage 3
Rank	Rider	Team	Time
1	Andrea Pasqualon (ITA)	Wanty–Groupe Gobert	10h 34' 06"
2	Jan Tratnik (SLO)	CCC–Sprandi–Polkowice	+ 7"
3	Alexander Krieger (GER)	Leopard Pro Cycling	+ 23"
4	Angelo Tulik (FRA)	Direct Énergie	+ 24"
5	Huub Duijn (NED)	Vérandas Willems–Crelan	+ 24"
6	Pit Leyder (LUX)	Leopard Pro Cycling	+ 25"
7	Thomas Sprengers (BEL)	Sport Vlaanderen–Baloise	+ 25"
8	Alex Kirsch (LUX)	WB Aqua Protect Veranclassic	+ 28"
9	Aimé De Gendt (BEL)	Sport Vlaanderen–Baloise	+ 30"
10	Eduard Prades (ESP)	Euskadi–Murias	+ 32"

=== Stage 4 ===
3 June 2018 — Mersch to Luxembourg City, 176 km (109 mi)

Stage 4 Result
Rank	Rider	Team	Time
1	Anthony Perez (FRA)	Cofidis	3h 57' 31"
2	Eduard Prades (ESP)	Euskadi–Murias	+ 0"
3	Andrea Pasqualon (ITA)	Wanty–Groupe Gobert	+ 0"
4	Pit Leyder (LUX)	Leopard Pro Cycling	+ 0"
5	Angelo Tulik (FRA)	Direct Énergie	+ 4"
6	Mauro Finetto (ITA)	Delko–Marseille Provence KTM	+ 4"
7	Thomas Sprengers (BEL)	Sport Vlaanderen–Baloise	+ 4"
8	Huub Duijn (NED)	Vérandas Willems–Crelan	+ 4"
9	Alexander Krieger (GER)	Leopard Pro Cycling	+ 4"
10	Jan Tratnik (SLO)	CCC–Sprandi–Polkowice	+ 4"

General classification after Stage 4
Rank	Rider	Team	Time
1	Andrea Pasqualon (ITA)	Wanty–Groupe Gobert	14h 31' 33"
2	Jan Tratnik (SLO)	CCC–Sprandi–Polkowice	+ 15"
3	Pit Leyder (LUX)	Leopard Pro Cycling	+ 29"
4	Eduard Prades (ESP)	Euskadi–Murias	+ 30"
5	Alexander Krieger (GER)	Leopard Pro Cycling	+ 31"
6	Angelo Tulik (FRA)	Direct Énergie	+ 32"
7	Huub Duijn (NED)	Vérandas Willems–Crelan	+ 32"
8	Thomas Sprengers (BEL)	Sport Vlaanderen–Baloise	+ 33"
9	Anthony Perez (FRA)	Cofidis	+ 36"
10	Mauro Finetto (ITA)	Delko–Marseille Provence KTM	+ 40"

== Classification leadership table ==
Stage	Winner	General classification	Points classification	Mountains classification	Young rider classification	Teams classification
P	Damien Gaudin	Damien Gaudin	Damien Gaudin	not awarded	Aimé De Gendt	Direct Énergie
1	Christophe Laporte	Damien Gaudin	Alexander Krieger	Patryk Stosz	Alex Kirsch	Direct Énergie
2	Andrea Pasqualon	Alexander Krieger	Alexander Krieger	Patryk Stosz	Alex Kirsch	Sport Vlaanderen–Baloise
3	Andrea Pasqualon	Andrea Pasqualon	Andrea Pasqualon	Patryk Stosz	Pit Leyder	Sport Vlaanderen–Baloise
4	Anthony Perez	Andrea Pasqualon	Andrea Pasqualon	Mauro Finetto	Pit Leyder	Sport Vlaanderen–Baloise
Final		Andrea Pasqualon	Andrea Pasqualon	Mauro Finetto	Pit Leyder	Sport Vlaanderen–Baloise

== Final classification standings ==
Legend
Denotes the winner of the general classification	Denotes the winner of the mountains classification
Denotes the winner of the points classification	Denotes the winner of the young rider classification

=== General classification ===
Final general classification (1–10)
Rank	Rider	Team	Time
1	Andrea Pasqualon (ITA)	Wanty–Groupe Gobert	14h 31' 33"
2	Jan Tratnik (SLO)	CCC–Sprandi–Polkowice	+ 15"
3	Pit Leyder (LUX)	Leopard Pro Cycling	+ 29"
4	Eduard Prades (ESP)	Euskadi–Murias	+ 30"
5	Alexander Krieger (GER)	Leopard Pro Cycling	+ 31"
6	Angelo Tulik (FRA)	Direct Énergie	+ 32"
7	Huub Duijn (NED)	Vérandas Willems–Crelan	+ 32"
8	Thomas Sprengers (BEL)	Sport Vlaanderen–Baloise	+ 33"
9	Anthony Perez (FRA)	Cofidis	+ 36"
10	Mauro Finetto (ITA)	Delko–Marseille Provence KTM	+ 40"

=== Points classification ===
Final points classification (1–10)
Rank	Rider	Team	Points
1	Andrea Pasqualon (ITA)	Wanty–Groupe Gobert	66
2	Alexander Krieger (GER)	Leopard Pro Cycling	43
3	Alex Kirsch (LUX)	WB Aqua Protect Veranclassic	32
4	Jan Tratnik (SLO)	CCC–Sprandi–Polkowice	25
5	Angelo Tulik (FRA)	Direct Énergie	25
6	Pit Leyder (LUX)	Leopard Pro Cycling	22
7	Eduard Prades (ESP)	Euskadi–Murias	22
8	Anthony Perez (FRA)	Cofidis	20
9	Christophe Laporte (FRA)	Cofidis	20
10	Damien Gaudin (FRA)	Direct Énergie	20

=== Mountains classification ===
Final mountains classification (1–10)
Rank	Rider	Team	Points
1	Mauro Finetto (ITA)	Delko–Marseille Provence KTM	19
2	Patryk Stosz (POL)	CCC–Sprandi–Polkowice	19
3	Amaro Antunes (POR)	CCC–Sprandi–Polkowice	12
4	Lukas Meiler (GER)	Team Vorarlberg Santic	12
5	Matteo Badilatti (SUI)	Team Vorarlberg Santic	11
6	Jan Tratnik (SLO)	CCC–Sprandi–Polkowice	10
7	Paweł Cieślik (POL)	CCC–Sprandi–Polkowice	8
8	Romain Combaud (FRA)	Delko–Marseille Provence KTM	8
9	Davide Orrico (ITA)	Team Vorarlberg Santic	8
10	Jan-Willem van Schip (NED)	Roompot–Nederlandse Loterij	8

=== Young rider classification ===
Final young rider classification (1–10)
Rank	Rider	Team	Time
1	Pit Leyder (LUX)	Leopard Pro Cycling	14h 32' 02"
2	Aimé De Gendt (BEL)	Sport Vlaanderen–Baloise	+ 22"
3	Benjamin Declercq (BEL)	Sport Vlaanderen–Baloise	+ 34"
4	Alex Kirsch (LUX)	WB Aqua Protect Veranclassic	+ 38"
5	Floris Gerts (NED)	Roompot–Nederlandse Loterij	+ 46"
6	Szymon Rekita (POL)	Leopard Pro Cycling	+ 1' 13"
7	Mathias Le Turnier (FRA)	Cofidis	+ 1' 41"
8	Roland Thalmann (SUI)	Team Vorarlberg Santic	+ 2' 41"
9	Jeroen Meijers (NED)	Roompot–Nederlandse Loterij	+ 2' 55"
10	Oscar Riesebeek (NED)	Roompot–Nederlandse Loterij	+ 3' 01"

=== Teams classification ===
Final teams classification (1–10)
Rank	Team	Time
1	Sport Vlaanderen–Baloise	43h 36' 56"
2	Leopard Pro Cycling	+ 24"
3	CCC–Sprandi–Polkowice	+ 1' 13"
4	Roompot–Nederlandse Loterij	+ 1' 20"
5	Delko–Marseille Provence KTM	+ 1' 39"
6	Direct Énergie	+ 2' 39"
7	WB Aqua Protect Veranclassic	+ 3' 13"
8	Team Vorarlberg Santic	+ 4' 00"
9	Cofidis	+ 7' 35"
10	Differdange–Losch	+ 10' 17"
