= Joël Zangerlé =

Luxembourgish cyclist

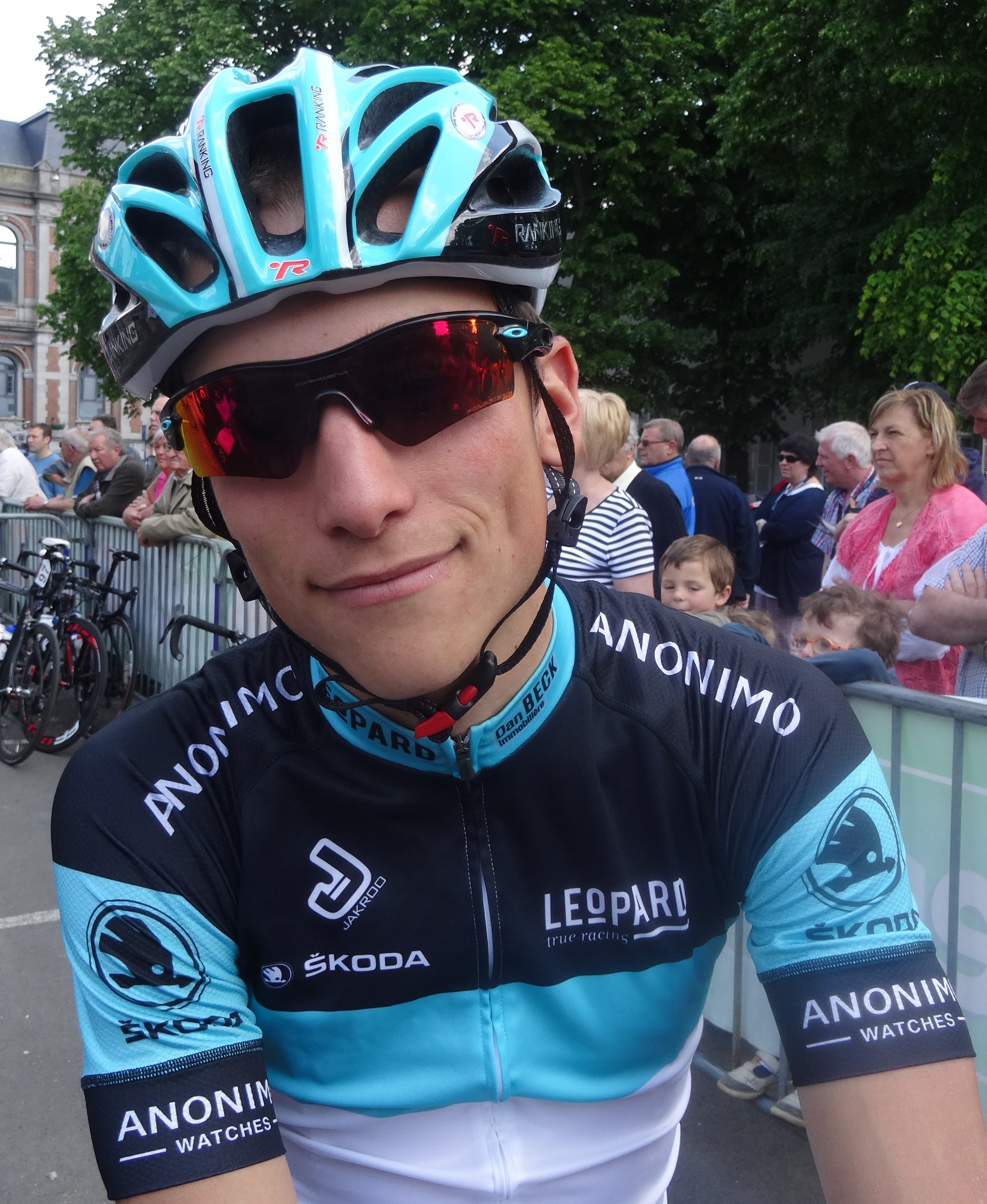
- Zangerlé at the 2014 Grand Prix Criquielion

Personal information
- Full name: Joël Zangerlé
- Born: 11 October 1988 (age 38) Ettelbruck, Luxembourg
- Height: 181 cm (5 ft 11 in)
- Weight: 63 kg (139 lb)

Cycling career
- Sport: Cycling
- Current team: Retired
- Discipline: Road
- Role: Rider
- Rider type: All-rounder

Amateur team
- 2009–2010: SCO Dijon

Professional teams
- 2011: Differdange–Magic–SportFood.de
- 2012–2014: Leopard–Trek Continental Team
- 2015: Cult Energy Pro Cycling
- 2016: Leopard Pro Cycling
Medal record
Representing Luxembourg
Games of the Small States of Europe
| Gold medal – first place | Luxembourg 2013 | Road race |

Joël Zangerlé (born 11 October 1988) is a Luxembourgish former professional racing cyclist.

== Major results ==
2005
3rd Time trial, National Junior Road Championships
2006
3rd Road race, National Junior Road Championships
2010
1st Road race, National Under-23 Road Championships
2013
1st Road race, Games of the Small States of Europe
6th Overall Flèche du Sud
8th Overall Circuit des Ardennes
10th Omloop der Kempen
2014
2nd Overall Flèche du Sud
10th Overall Oberösterreich Rundfahrt
2015
9th Velothon Wales
