= Arthur Kluckers =

Luxembourgish cyclist (born 2000)

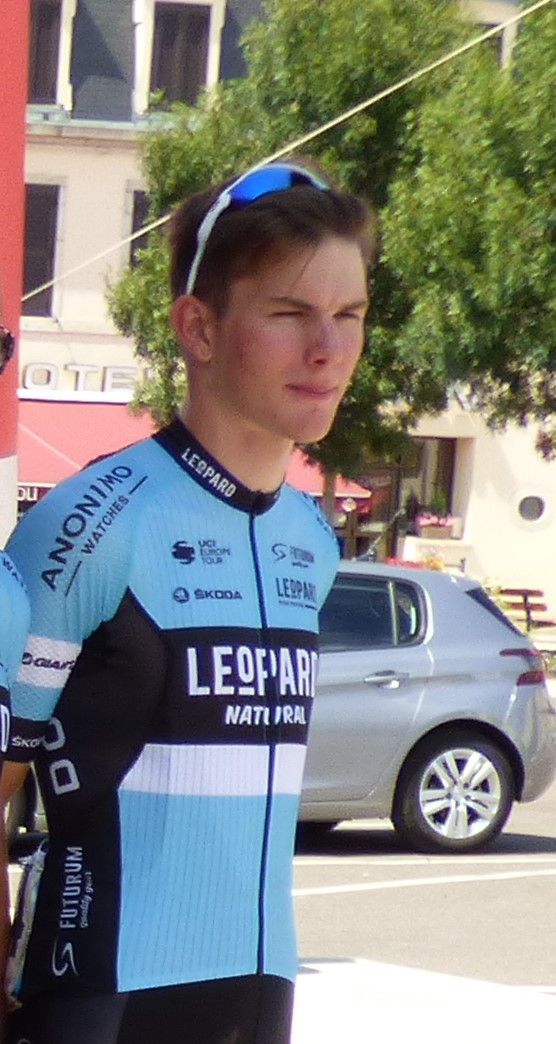
- Kluckers in 2019

Personal information
- Born: 15 March 2000 (age 26)
- Height: 1.91 m (6 ft 3 in)
- Weight: 71 kg (157 lb)

Cycling career
- Sport: Cycling
- Current team: Tudor Pro Cycling Team
- Discipline: Road
- Role: Rider

Amateur team
- 2016–2018: VC Schengen

Professional team
- 2019–2022: Leopard Pro Cycling
- 2022: UAE Team Emirates (stagiaire)
- 2023–: Tudor Pro Cycling Team

Major wins
- One-day races and Classics National Road Race Championships (2025) National Time Trial Championships (2024)

Arthur Kluckers (born 15 March 2000) is a Luxembourgish professional cyclist, who currently rides for UCI ProTeam Tudor Pro Cycling Team.

== Major results ==
2017
1st Time trial, National Junior Road Championships
2018
National Junior Road Championships

1st Time trial
2nd Road race

2nd Combined team (with Nicolas Kess), Summer Youth Olympics
2nd Grand Prix François Faber
7th Overall Grand Prix Rüebliland
2019
1st Stage 3 Tour de l'Oder
National Under-23 Road Championships

3rd Road race
4th Time trial

2020
3rd Time trial, National Under-23 Road Championships
2021
National Under-23 Road Championships

1st Road race
1st Time trial

4th Overall Course de la Paix U23 – Grand Prix Jeseníky
2022
National Under-23 Road Championships

1st Time trial
2nd Road race

1st Stage 5 Flèche du Sud
5th Overall Tour Alsace

1st Stage 4

5th Overall Le Triptyque des Monts et Châteaux
6th Flèche Ardennaise
9th Grand Prix de la Somme
9th Time trial, UEC European Under-23 Road Championships
2023
2nd Time trial, National Road Championships
8th Overall Tour Poitou-Charentes en Nouvelle-Aquitaine
2024 (1 pro win)
1st Time trial, National Road Championships
7th Overall ZLM Tour
2025 (1)
National Road Championships

1st Road race
3rd Time trial
