= Pit Schlechter =

Luxembourgish cyclist

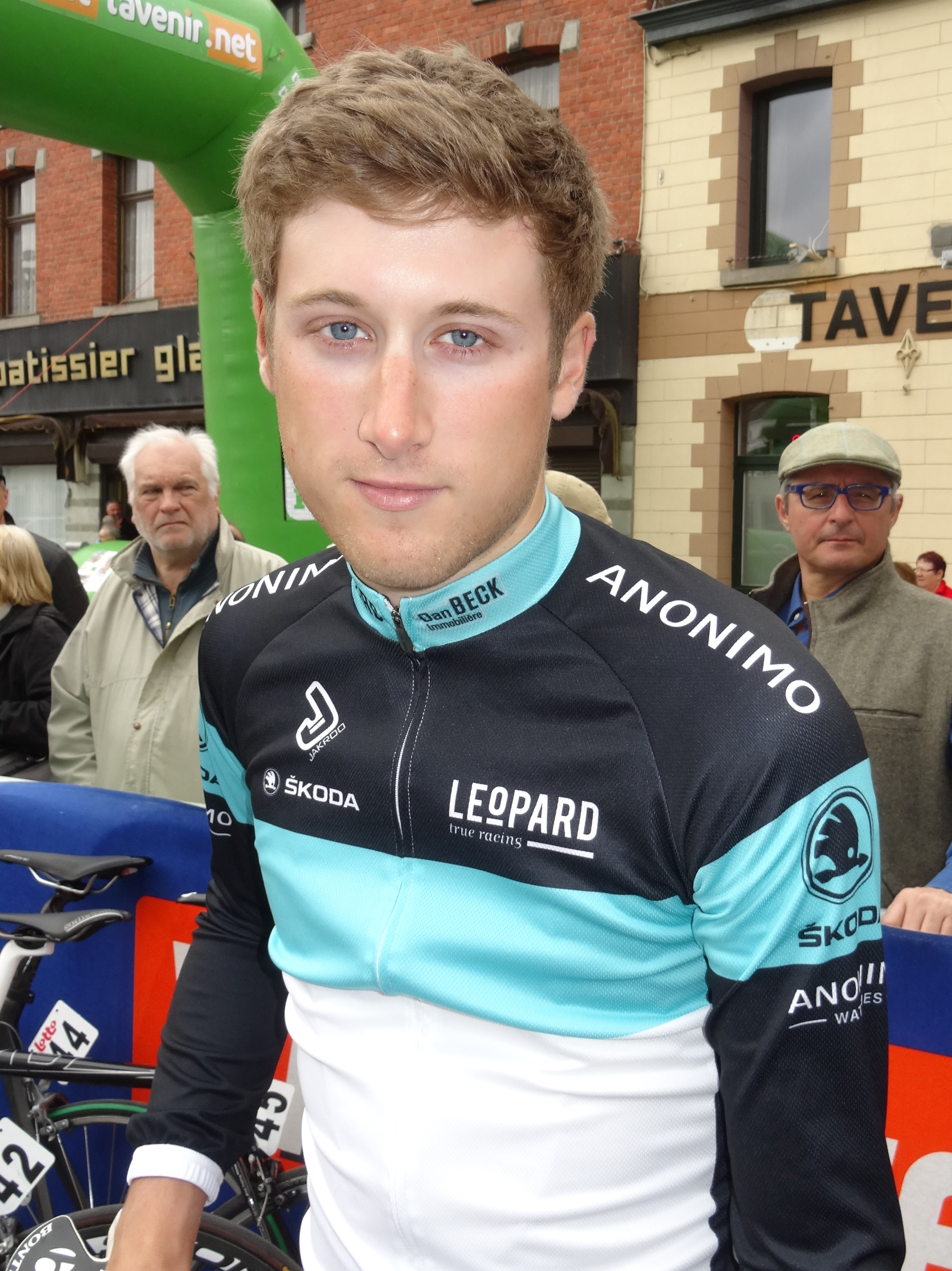
- Schlechter in 2014

Personal information
- Full name: Pit Schlechter
- Born: 26 October 1990 (age 35) Luxembourg City

Cycling career
- Sport: Cycling
- Current team: Retired
- Discipline: Road
- Role: Rider

Amateur teams
- 2009: Continental Team Differdange (stagiaire)
- 2020–2021: LC Tétange

Professional teams
- 2010: Continental Team Differdange
- 2012–2019: Leopard–Trek Continental Team
Medal record
Representing Liechtenstein
Men's road cycling
Games of the Small States of Europe
Bronze medal – third place	Liechtenstein 2011	Road race

Pit Schlechter (born 26 October 1990 in Luxembourg City) is a Luxembourgish former professional cyclist, who rode professionally between 2010 and 2019 for the Continental Team Differdange and Leopard Pro Cycling squads.

== Major results ==
2007
National Junior Road Championships

1st Road race
3rd Time trial

2008
2nd Time trial, National Junior Road Championships
2009
2nd Time trial, National Under-23 Road Championships
2011
3rd Road race, Games of the Small States of Europe
National Under-23 Road Championships

3rd Time trial
3rd Road race

2012
3rd Road race, National Under-23 Road Championships
2013
1st GP Marc Angel
2nd Road race, National Road Championships
5th Ronde Pévéloise
2015
3rd Road race, National Road Championships
5th Grand Prix de la ville de Pérenchies
5th Gooikse Pijl
