= Tom Wirtgen =

Luxembourgish cyclist

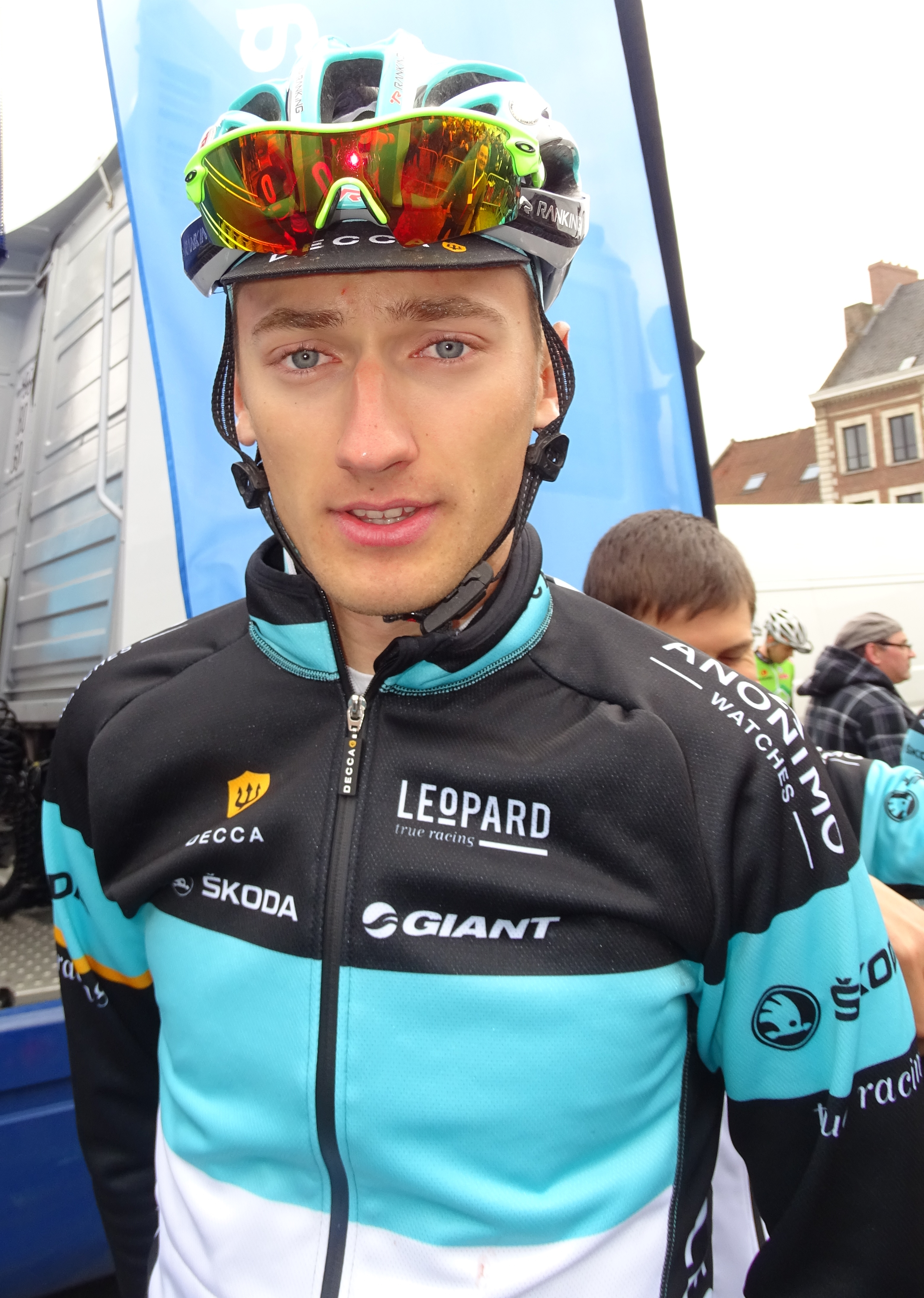
- Wirtgen in 2016.

Personal information
- Full name: Tom Wirtgen
- Born: 4 March 1996 (age 30) Dippach, Luxembourg
- Height: 1.90 m (6 ft 3 in)
- Weight: 77 kg (170 lb)

Cycling career
- Sport: Cycling
- Current team: Team Felt–Felbermayr
- Discipline: Road
- Role: Rider

Amateur team
- 2014: UC Dippach

Professional teams
- 2015–2017: Leopard Development Team
- 2018: AGO–Aqua Service
- 2018: WB Aqua Protect Veranclassic (stagiaire)
- 2019–2022: Wallonie Bruxelles
- 2023: Global 6 Cycling
- 2024–: Team Felt–Felbermayr

Tom Wirtgen (born 4 March 1996 in Dippach) is a Luxembourgish cyclist, who currently rides for UCI Continental team Team Felt–Felbermayr.

== Major results ==
2013
National Junior Road Championships

1st Road race
1st Time trial

3rd Overall 3-Etappen-Rundfahrt

1st Stage 3

2014
National Junior Road Championships

1st Road race
1st Time trial

5th Road race, UEC European Under-23 Road Championships
6th Time trial, UCI Junior Road World Championships
2015
National Under-23 Road Championships

1st Road race
1st Time trial

2017
1st Time trial, National Under-23 Road Championships
1st Young rider classification, International Tour of Rhodes
4th Time trial, UCI Under-23 Road World Championships
8th Overall Le Triptyque des Monts et Châteaux
2018
1st Time trial, National Under-23 Road Championships
1st Stage 2 Tour du Jura
5th Overall Le Triptyque des Monts et Châteaux
2019
2nd Time trial, National Road Championships
2020
10th Paris–Camembert
2023
3rd Time trial, National Road Championships
2024
National Road Championships

3rd Time trial
5th Road race
