= Jan Petelin =

Luxembourgish cyclist

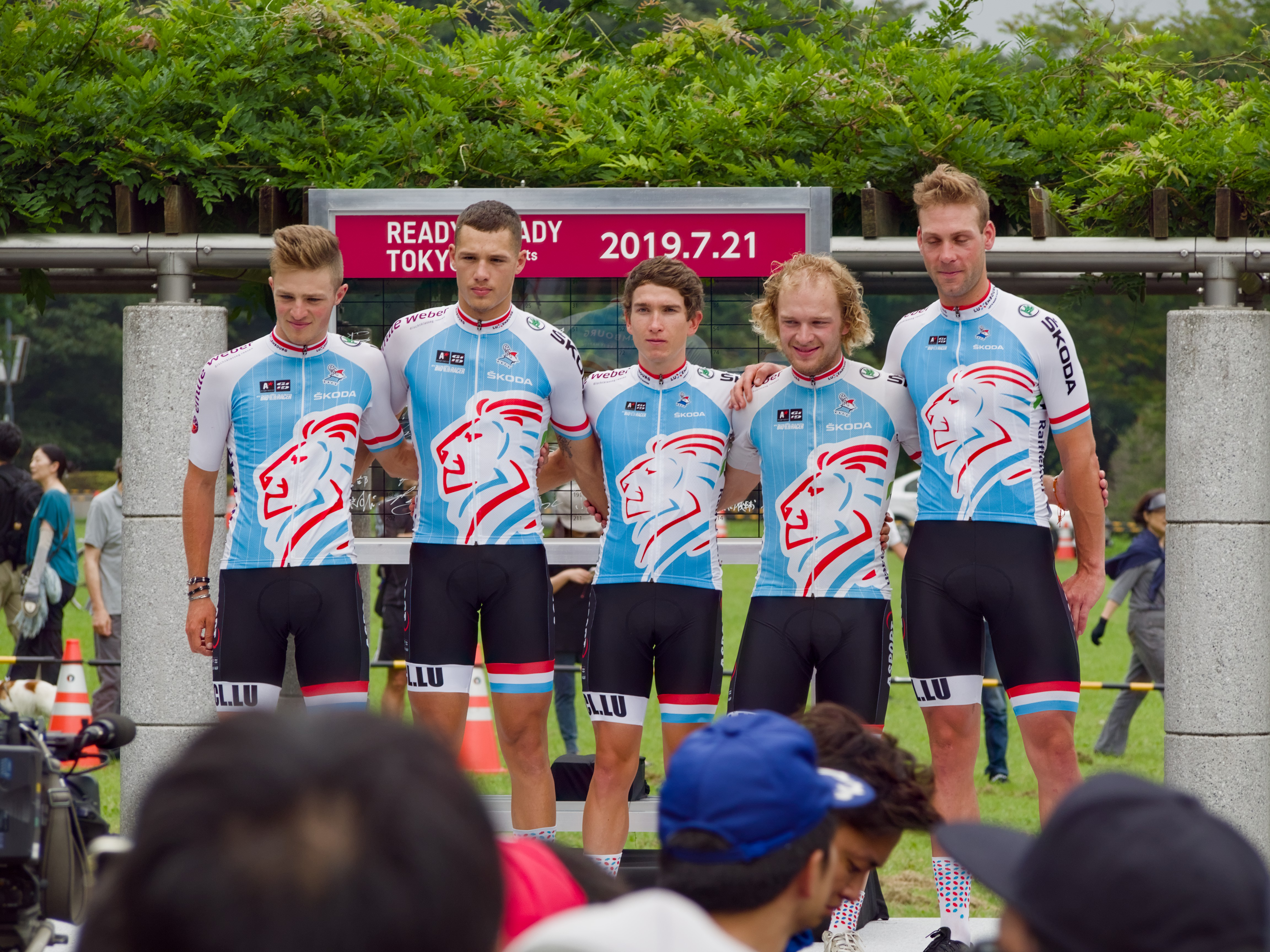
- Petelin (second from right) in 2019

Personal information
- Born: 2 July 1996 (age 30) Luxembourg City, Luxembourg
- Height: 1.71 m (5 ft 7 in)
- Weight: 67 kg (148 lb)

Cycling career
- Sport: Cycling
- Discipline: Road
- Role: Rider

Amateur team
- 2015: Selle Italia–Cieffe–Ursus

Professional teams
- 2016–2019: Differdange–Losch
- 2020–2021: Vini Zabù–KTM

Jan Petelin (born 2 July 1996) is a Luxembourgish cyclist, who last rode for UCI ProTeam Vini Zabù.

== Major results ==
2016
National Under-23 Road Championships

2nd Road race
3rd Time trial

8th Road race, National Road Championships
10th Eschborn–Frankfurt Under–23
2017
7th Road race, National Road Championships
9th Tour de Berne
10th Duo Normand
2018
4th Road race, National Under-23 Road Championships
2019
National Road Championships

7th Road race
7th Time trial
