= Tom Thill =

Luxembourgish cyclist

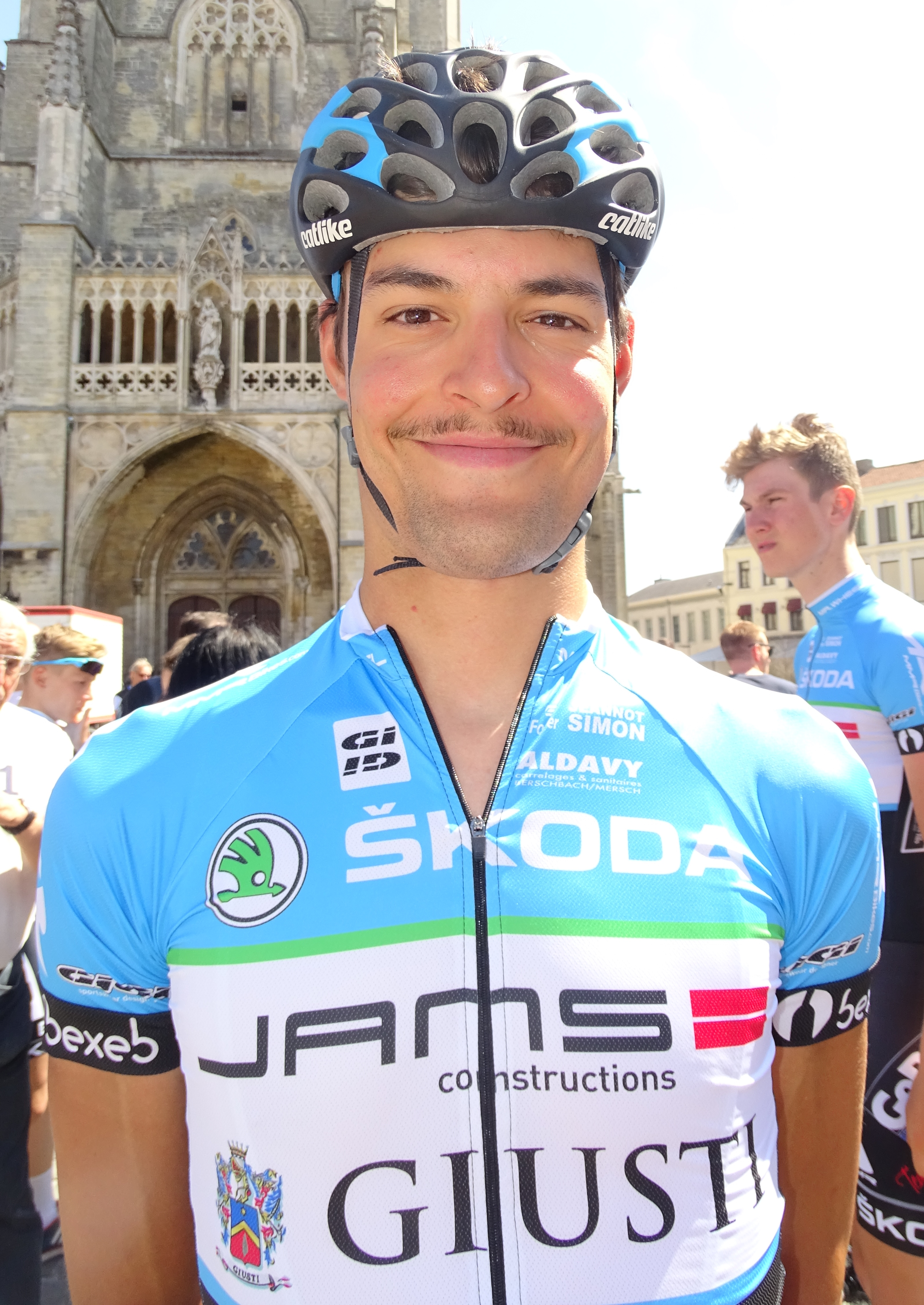
- Thill in 2015

Personal information
- Full name: Tom Thill
- Born: 31 March 1990 (age 36) Luxembourg City, Luxembourg
- Height: 1.87 m (6 ft 2 in)
- Weight: 73 kg (161 lb)

Cycling career
- Sport: Cycling
- Current team: Team Snooze–VSD
- Discipline: Road
- Role: Rider
- Rider type: Time trialist

Amateur team
- 2022–: Team Snooze–VSD

Professional teams
- 2009–2012: Continental Team Differdange
- 2013–2014: Leopard–Trek Continental Team
- 2015–2019: Differdange–Losch
- 2020–2021: XSpeed United Continental
Medal record
Representing Liechtenstein
Men's road cycling
Games of the Small States of Europe
Bronze medal – third place	Liechtenstein 2011	Time trial
Bronze medal – third place	Luxembourg 2013	Road race

Tom Thill (born 31 March 1990) is a Luxembourgish cyclist, who currently rides for amateur team Team Snooze–VSD.

== Major results ==
2003
1st Road race, National Cadet Road Championships
2004
2nd Road race, National Cadet Road Championships
2005
1st Road race, National Junior Road Championships
2007
National Junior Road Championships

1st Time trial
3rd Road race

1st Junior race, National Cyclo-cross Championships
2008
1st Time trial, National Junior Road Championships
2009
2nd Time trial, National Under-23 Road Championships
2010
National Road Championships

1st Under-23 time trial
5th Time trial

2011
National Under-23 Road Championships

2nd Time trial
2nd Road race

3rd Time trial, Games of the Small States of Europe
2013
3rd Road race, Games of the Small States of Europe
National Road Championships

5th Time trial
5th Road race

9th Ronde Pévéloise
2014
6th Ronde Pévéloise
2015
1st Overall Tour de Hongrie
2016
5th Circuit de Wallonie
2017
5th Road race, National Road Championships
2018
National Road Championships

3rd Time trial
5th Road race

8th Duo Normand (with Josh Teasdale)
2019
10th Gemenc Grand Prix I
2020
4th Time trial, National Road Championships
2022
4th Time trial, National Road Championships
