= Ben Gastauer =

Luxembourgish road cyclist

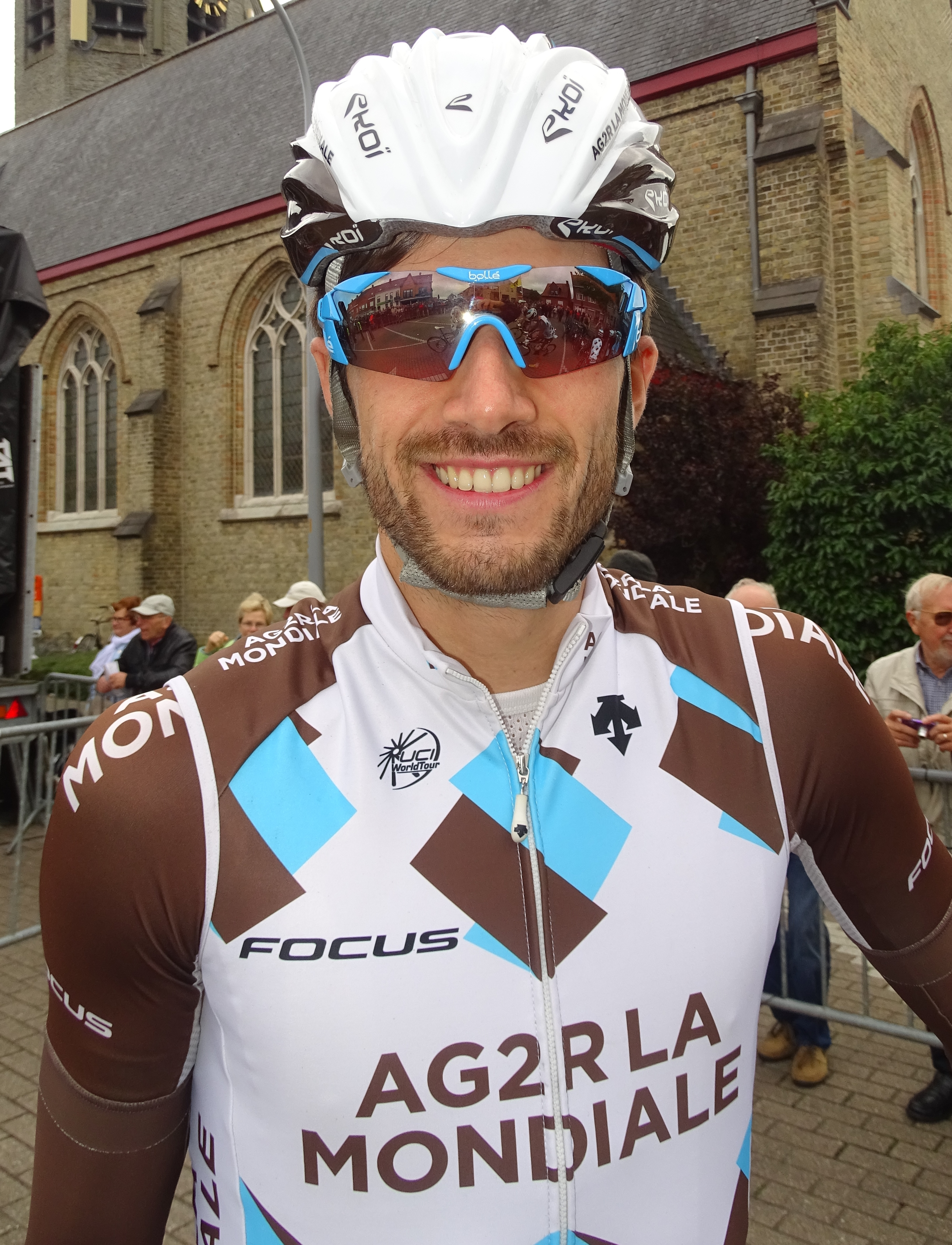
- Gastauer at the 2015 Kampioenschap van Vlaanderen

Personal information
- Full name: Ben Gastauer
- Nickname: Benny
- Born: 14 November 1987 (age 38) Dudelange, Luxembourg
- Height: 1.90 m (6 ft 3 in)
- Weight: 72 kg (159 lb)

Cycling career
- Sport: Cycling
- Current team: Retired
- Discipline: Road
- Role: Rider
- Rider type: All-rounder

Amateur teams
- 1993–2006: LP07 Schifflange
- 2007–2008: FidiBC.com–VC Arbedo
- 2009: Chambéry CF
- 2009: Ag2r–La Mondiale (stagiaire)

Professional team
- 2010–2021: Ag2r–La Mondiale

Major wins
- One-day races and Classics National Time Trial Championships (2012)

Ben Gastauer (born 14 November 1987) is a Luxembourgish former professional road cyclist, who rode professionally for the AG2R Citroën Team between 2010 and 2021.

He took three professional victories during his career: the Luxembourgish National Time Trial Championships in 2012, and the general classification and a stage at the 2015 Tour du Haut Var. He was part of the Ag2r–La Mondiale squad that won the team classification and delivered Jean-Christophe Péraud to the podium at the 2014 Tour de France, and part of those which assisted Romain Bardet to podium finishes at the 2016 Tour de France and the 2017 Tour de France. In August 2021 the AG2R Citroën Team announced that Gastauer would retire from competition at the end of the season due to a problem with his pelvic floor, finishing his career at the 2021 Tour de Luxembourg the following month.

== Major results ==
2005
1st Time trial, National Junior Road Championships
2nd Classique des Alpes
10th Overall Grand Prix Rüebliland
2006
1st Road race, National Under-23 Road Championships
2007
1st Road race, National Under-23 Road Championships
5th Overall Grand Prix du Portugal
2008
1st Time trial, National Under-23 Road Championships
1st Ruota d'Oro
9th Overall Flèche du Sud
2009
National Under-23 Road Championships

1st Road race
1st Time trial

1st Overall Tour des Pays de Savoie

1st Points classification
1st Stage 1

2nd Overall Flèche du Sud
9th Giro del Mendrisiotto
2010
3rd Road race, National Road Championships
6th Overall Paris–Corrèze
2012
National Road Championships

1st Time trial
2nd Road race

2013
3rd Time trial, National Road Championships
2014
National Road Championships

2nd Road race
4th Time trial

2015
1st Overall Tour du Haut Var

1st Stage 1

National Road Championships

2nd Road race
4th Time trial

2016
1st Mountains classification, Tour du Haut Var
4th Road race, National Road Championships
2017
National Road Championships

3rd Road race
4th Time trial

2019
4th Time trial, National Road Championships

=== Grand Tour general classification results timeline ===
Grand Tour	2011	2012	2013	2014	2015	2016	2017	2018	2019	2020
Giro d'Italia	88	67	51	—	—	—	29	—	79	DNF
Tour de France	—	—	—	21	DNF	61	37	—	—	—
Vuelta a España	—	81	65	—	—	—	—	36	—	—

Legend
—	Did not compete
DNF	Did not finish
