= Michel Ries =

Luxembourgish cyclist (born 1998)

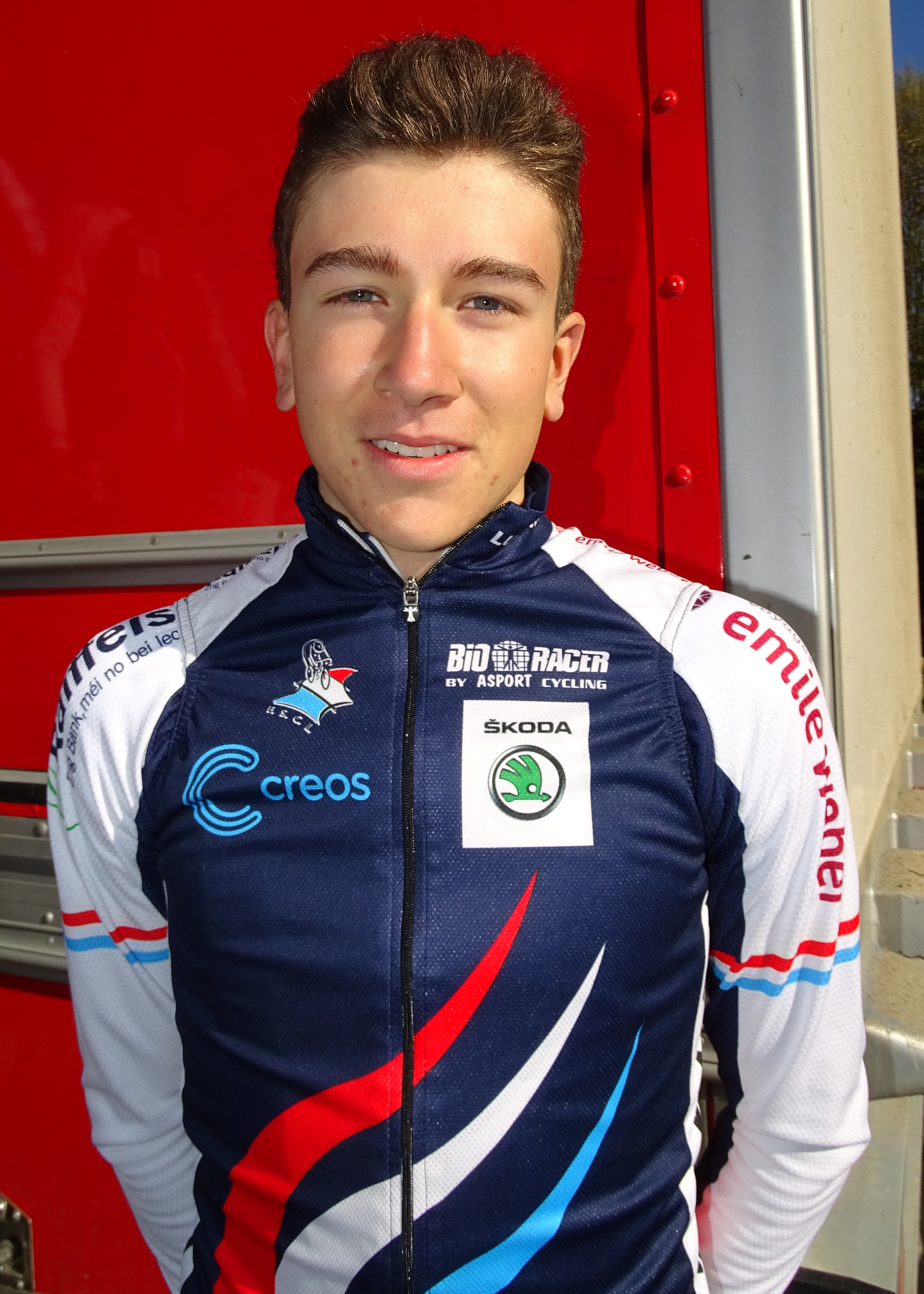
- Ries in 2016.

Personal information
- Full name: Michel Ries
- Born: 11 March 1998 (age 28) Luxembourg
- Height: 1.84 m (6 ft 0 in)
- Weight: 67 kg (148 lb)

Cycling career
- Sport: Cycling
- Current team: Arkéa–B&B Hotels
- Discipline: Road
- Role: Rider (retired)

Amateur team
- 2016–2017: UC Dippach

Professional teams
- 2018–2019: Polartec–Kometa
- 2018: Trek–Segafredo (stagiaire)
- 2020–2021: Trek–Segafredo
- 2022–2025: Arkéa–Samsic

Michel Ries (born 11 March 1998) is a Luxembourgish retired professional cyclist, who last rode for UCI WorldTeam Arkéa–B&B Hotels.

In October 2020, he was named in the startlist for the 2020 Vuelta a España. He represented Luxembourg at the 2020 Summer Olympics.

== Major results ==
2015
2nd Time trial, National Junior Road Championships
2016
National Junior Road Championships

1st Time trial
1st Road race

2017
2nd Time trial, National Under-23 Road Championships
2018
3rd Time trial, National Under-23 Road Championships
9th Overall Giro Ciclistico d'Italia
10th Overall Tour de l'Avenir
2019
1st Stage 3 Giro della Valle d'Aosta
7th Overall Tour de l'Avenir
9th Overall Giro di Sicilia
2020
1st Time trial, National Under-23 Road Championships
2021
2nd Time trial, National Road Championships
7th Mont Ventoux Dénivelé Challenge
2022
2nd Time trial, National Road Championships
9th Giro dell'Appennino
9th Mercan'Tour Classic
2023
2nd Road race, National Road Championships
2024
2nd Time trial, National Road Championships

=== Grand Tour general classification results timeline ===
Grand Tour	2020	2021	2022	2023	2024	2025
Giro d'Italia	—	—	—	86	25	DNF
Tour de France	—	—	—	—	—	—
Vuelta a España	60	—	—	66	DNF	—

Legend
—	Did not compete
DNF	Did not finish
