= Cycling at the 2011 Games of the Small States of Europe =

Cycling at the 2011 Games of the Small States of Europe was held from 31 May – 3 June 2011.

== Medal summary ==
=== Road Race ===
Event	Gold		Silver		Bronze	
Men	Bob Jungels (LUX)	2:36:26,82	Stefan Küng (LIE)	2:38:35,82	Pit Schlechter (LUX)	2:38:35,94
Women	Christine Majerus (LUX)	1:53:56,74	Daniela Veronesi (SMR)	1:53:56,86	Nathalie Lamborelle (LUX)	1:53:56,95

=== Time Trial ===
Event	Gold		Silver		Bronze	
Men	Bob Jungels (LUX)	30:17.28	Stefan Küng (LIE)	31:29.58	Tom Thill (LUX)	31:32.96

=== Mountain Bike ===
Event	Gold		Silver		Bronze	
Men	Vasilis Adamou (CYP)	1:19:19,18	Marios Athanasiadis (CYP)	1:21:36,53	Gusty Bausch (LUX)	1:22:10,66
Women	Daniela Veronesi (SMR)	1:16:09,84	Margot Moschetti (MON)	1:21:55,36	Antri Christoforou (CYP)	1:23:04,33

=== Medal table ===
Rank	Nation	Gold	Silver	Bronze	Total
1	Luxembourg	3	0	4	7
2	Cyprus	1	1	1	3
3	San Marino	1	1	0	2
4	Liechtenstein	0	2	0	2
5	Monaco	0	1	0	1
Totals (5 entries)		5	5	5	15
