= Colin Heiderscheid =

Luxembourgish cyclist (born 1998)

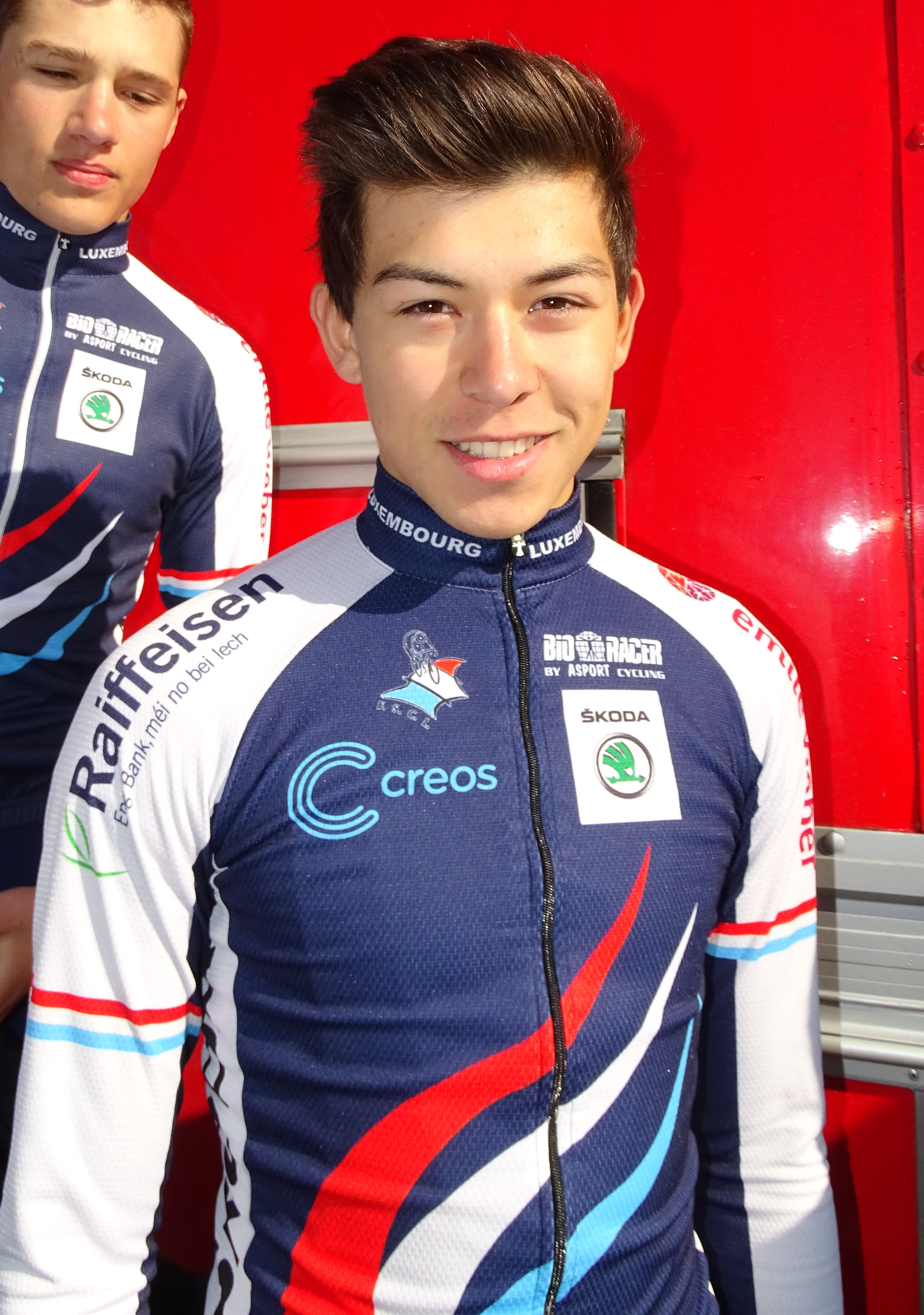
- Heiderscheid in 2016

Personal information
- Born: 28 January 1998 (age 28)
- Height: 1.80 m (5 ft 11 in)
- Weight: 73 kg (161 lb)

Cycling career
- Sport: Cycling
- Current team: Leopard TOGT Pro Cycling
- Discipline: Road
- Role: Rider
- Rider type: Sprinter

Amateur teams
- 2016–2017: UC Dippach
- 2017: CC Villeneuve Saint-Germain

Professional teams
- 2018: Dauner D&DQ–Akkon
- 2019–: Leopard Pro Cycling

Major wins
- One-day races and Classics National Road Race Championships (2022)

Colin Heiderscheid (born 28 January 1998) is a Luxembourgish professional cyclist, who currently rides for UCI Continental team Leopard TOGT Pro Cycling.

== Major results ==
2015
1st Road race, National Junior Road Championships
2016
Internationale Niedersachsen-Rundfahrt der Junioren

1st Points classification
1st Stage 1

9th Overall Tour des Portes du Pays d'Othe

1st Stage 3

2018
3rd Road race, National Under-23 Road Championships
5th Grand Prix de la Ville de Pérenchies
2019
9th Youngster Coast Challenge
2020
8th Road race, UEC European Under-23 Road Championships
8th Grand Prix de la Ville de Lillers
9th Puchar Ministra Obrony Narodowej
2022
1st Road race, National Road Championships
