= Kevin Geniets =

Luxembourgish cyclist

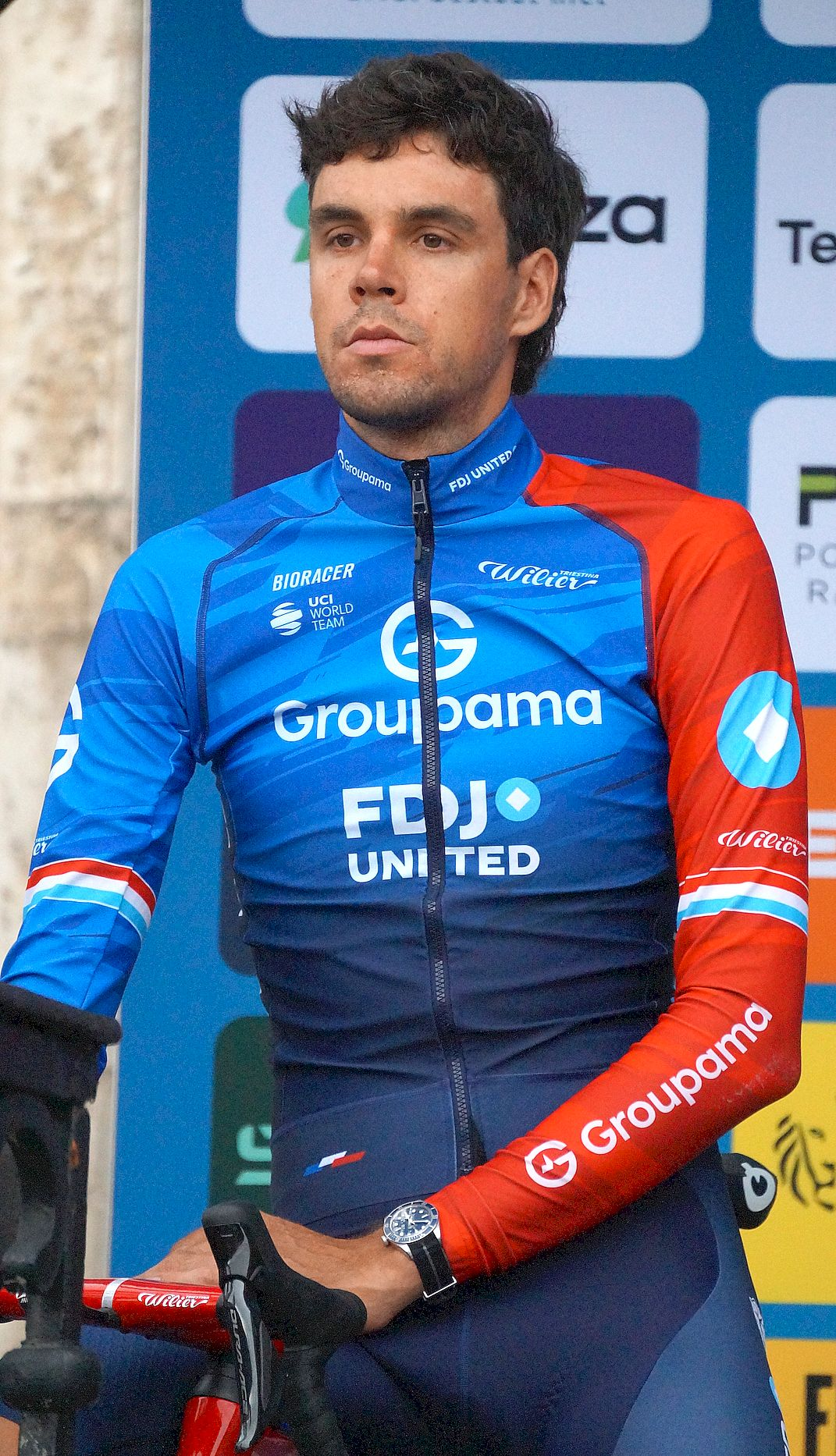
- Geniets in 2026

Personal information
- Full name: Kevin Geniets
- Born: 9 January 1997 (age 29) Esch-sur-Alzette, Luxembourg
- Height: 1.93 m (6 ft 4 in)
- Weight: 70 kg (154 lb)

Cycling career
- Sport: Cycling
- Current team: Groupama–FDJ United
- Discipline: Road
- Role: Rider

Amateur teams
- 2016–2018: Chambéry CF
- 2017: AG2R La Mondiale (stagiaire)

Professional teams
- 2019: Équipe Continentale Groupama–FDJ
- 2019–: Groupama–FDJ

Major wins
- One-day races and Classics National Road Race Championships (2020, 2021, 2024) National Time Trial Championships (2021)

Kevin Geniets (born 9 January 1997) is a Luxembourgish cyclist, who currently rides for UCI WorldTeam Groupama–FDJ United.

== Major results ==
2013
1st Road race, National Novice Road Championships
2014
2nd Time trial, National Junior Road Championships
2nd Overall Tour du Pays de Vaud
6th Overall Oberösterreich Juniorenrundfahrt

1st Stage 2

2015
1st Time trial, National Junior Road Championships
4th Overall Niedersachsen-Rundfahrt
4th Overall Tour du Pays de Vaud
6th Road race, UEC European Junior Road Championships
2016
National Under-23 Road Championships

1st Time trial
1st Road race

National Road Championships

5th Time trial
5th Road race

8th Road race, UEC European Under-23 Road Championships
2017
6th Chrono des Nations U23
6th Ronde van Vlaanderen Beloften
2019
1st Time trial, National Under-23 Road Championships
2nd Road race, National Road Championships
6th Boucles de l'Aulne
7th Time trial, UEC European Under-23 Road Championships
8th Paris–Camembert
8th Ronde van Vlaanderen Beloften
10th Grand Prix de Plumelec-Morbihan
2020 (1 pro win)
National Road Championships

1st Road race
3rd Time trial

4th Overall Étoile de Bessèges
2021 (2)
National Road Championships

1st Road race
1st Time trial

9th Omloop Het Nieuwsblad
10th Tro-Bro Léon
2022
5th Overall Tour de Luxembourg
10th Overall Tour des Alpes-Maritimes et du Var
10th Tour du Doubs
2023
4th Overall Tour des Alpes-Maritimes et du Var
2024 (2)
1st Road race, National Road Championships
1st Grand Prix La Marseillaise
10th Overall Étoile de Bessèges
2025
3rd Overall Étoile de Bessèges

=== Grand Tour general classification results timeline ===
Grand Tour	2021	2022	2023	2024
Giro d'Italia	—	—	—	—
Tour de France	—	48	41	58
Vuelta a España	85	—	—	DNF

Legend
—	Did not compete
DNF	Did not finish
