= Fábio Silvestre =

Portuguese cyclist

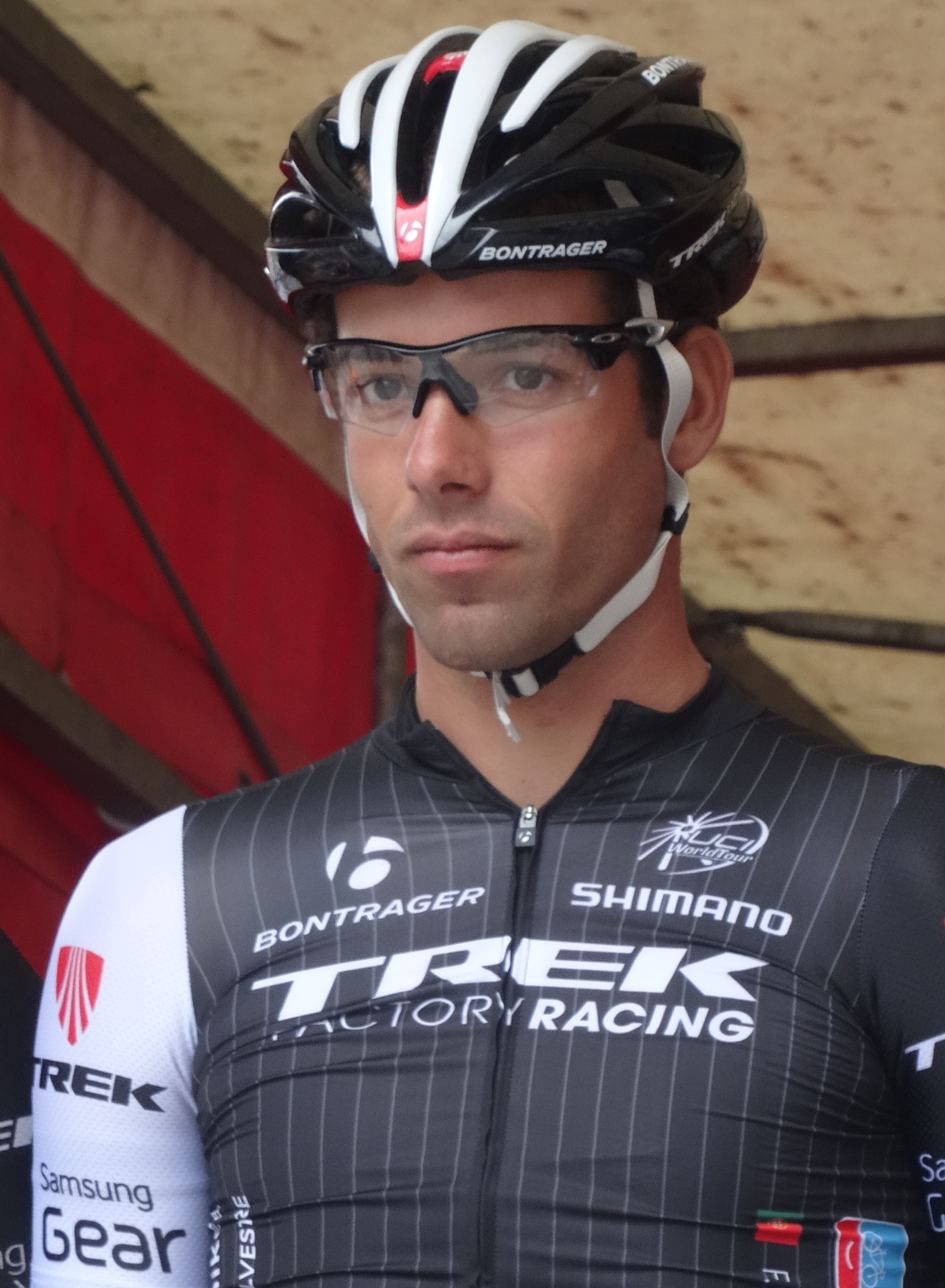
- Silvestre in 2014

Personal information
- Full name: Fábio André Silvestre Tomas
- Born: 25 January 1990 (age 36) Sobral de Monte Agraço, Portugal
- Height: 1.84 m (6 ft 0 in)
- Weight: 78 kg (172 lb)

Cycling career
- Sport: Cycling
- Current team: Retired
- Discipline: Road
- Role: Rider
- Rider type: Puncheur

Amateur team
- 2010–2011: Liberty Seguros–Santa Maria da Feira

Professional teams
- 2012–2013: Leopard–Trek Continental Team
- 2014–2015: Trek Factory Racing
- 2016: Leopard Pro Cycling
- 2017–2018: Sporting / Tavira

Fábio André Silvestre Tomas (born 25 January 1990 in Sobral de Monte Agraço) is a Portuguese former cyclist.

== Major results ==
2008
2nd Time trial, National Junior Road Championships
2010
2nd Time trial, National Under-23 Road Championships
3rd Overall Volta ao Alentejo
2011
National Under-23 Road Championships

1st Road race
3rd Time trial

2012
1st Time trial, National Under-23 Road Championships
4th Paris–Tours Espoirs
9th Duo Normand (with Alexandre Pliușchin)
10th Road race, UEC European Under-23 Road Championships
2013
1st Overall Le Triptyque des Monts et Châteaux

1st Points classification

1st Stage 4 Circuit des Ardennes
Ronde de l'Oise

1st Mountains classification
1st Stage 4

1st Stage 1 (TTT) Czech Cycling Tour
3rd Dorpenomloop Rucphen
4th Overall Tour de Normandie

1st Stage 1

7th Ronde van Noord-Holland
10th Grand Prix Südkärnten
