= Christian Poos =

Luxembourgish cyclist

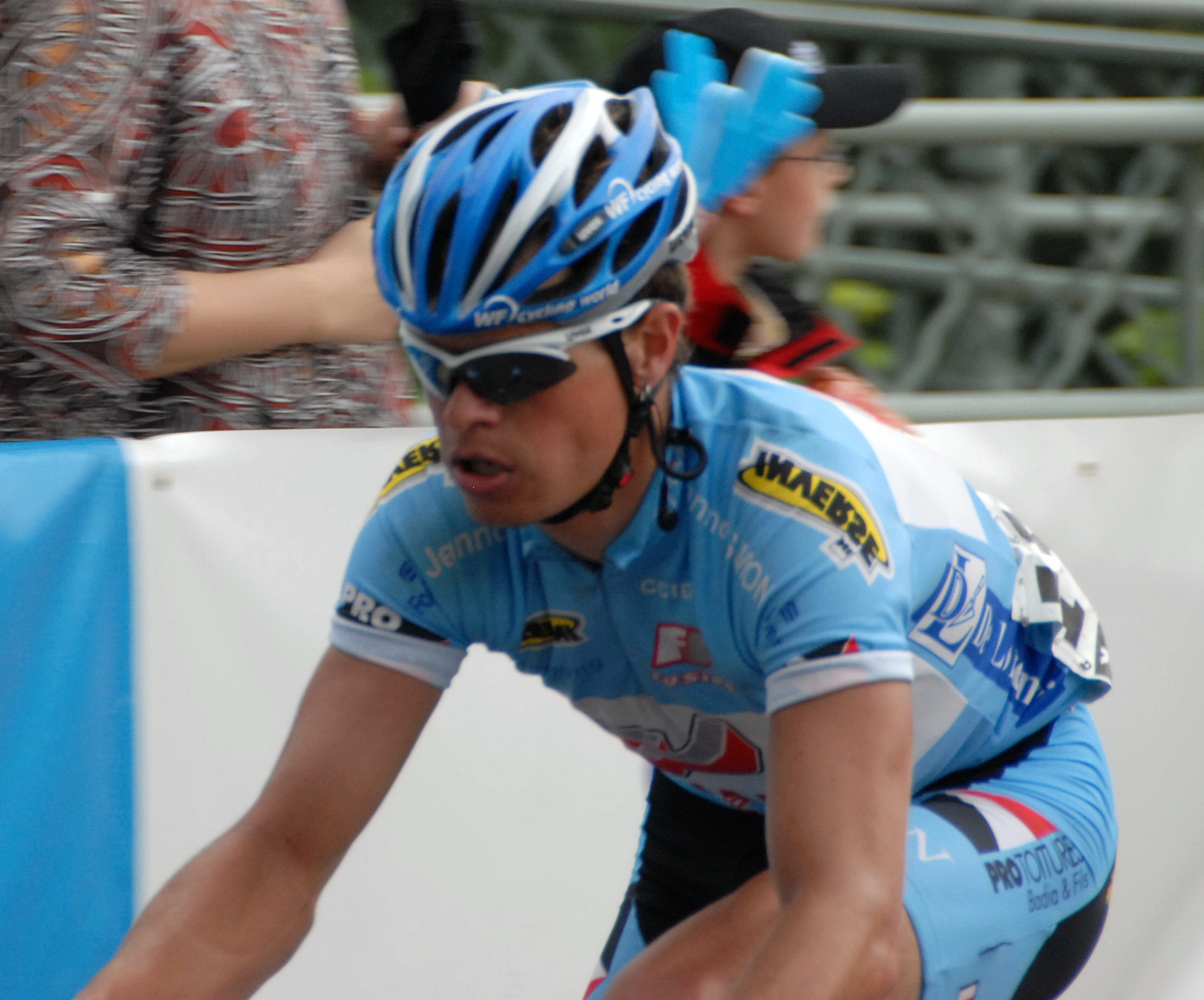

Personal information
- Born: 5 November 1977 (age 48) Luxembourg

Cycling career
- Sport: Cycling
- Discipline: Road
- Role: Rider

Amateur team
- 1997: Cofidis (stagiaire)

Professional teams
- 2000–2001: Post Swiss Team
- 2002–2003: Marlux–Ville de Charleroi
- 2007–2012: Continental Team Differdange

Christian Poos (born 5 November 1977) is a Luxembourgish cyclist. His sporting career began with Velo Club SaF Zeisseng.

== Major results ==
1997
1st U23 Liège-Bastogne-Liège
2nd National Road Race Championships
1999
National Time Trial Champion
2nd Tour de la Somme
2nd Chrono des Nations U23
2000
2nd National Road Race Championships
2001
National Road Race Champion
2002
National Road Race Champion
National Time Trial Champion
3rd Duo Normand (with Andy Cappelle)
2003
National Time Trial Champion
3rd National Road Race Championships
2007
National Time Trial Champion
2nd National Road Race Championships
2008
2nd National Time Trial Championships
3rd National Road Race Championships
2009
1st Grand Prix François-Faber
3rd National Time Trial Championships
2010
1st Grand Prix François-Faber
3rd National Time Trial Championships
2011
National Time Trial Champion
1st Stage 4 Cycling Tour of Sibiu
