= Laurent Didier =

Luxembourgish racing cyclist

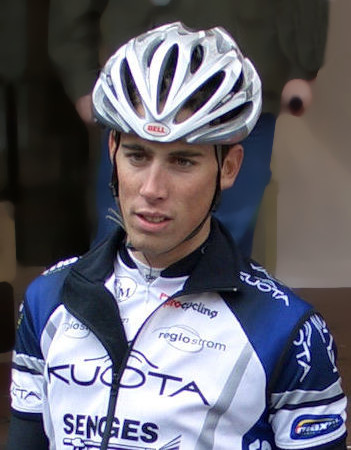
- Didier at the 2008 Münsterland Giro

Personal information
- Full name: Laurent Didier
- Born: 19 July 1984 (age 42) Dippach, Luxembourg
- Height: 1.89 m (6 ft 2 in)
- Weight: 68 kg (150 lb; 10.7 st)

Cycling career
- Sport: Cycling
- Current team: Retired
- Discipline: Road
- Role: Rider
- Rider type: All-rounder

Amateur team
- 2008: Team CSC (stagiaire)

Professional teams
- 2006–2008: Regiostrom–Senges
- 2009: Designa Køkken
- 2010–2011: Team Saxo Bank
- 2012–2018: RadioShack–Nissan

Major wins
- One-day races and Classics National Road Race Championships (2012) National Time Trial Championships (2014)

Laurent Didier (born 19 July 1984) is a Luxembourgish former professional road bicycle racer, who competed between 2006 and 2018 for the Kuota–Senges, Designa Køkken, Saxo Bank–SunGard and Trek–Segafredo teams.

== Career ==
Didier is from Dippach, Luxembourg and his ancestors are no strangers to the world of cycling. His father, Lucien Didier, was part of winning team time trial squads in the Tour de France and the Giro d'Italia, and his grandfather Bim Diederich won three stages of the Tour and wore the yellow jersey for three days. Laurent is good in various terrains which makes him useful in different kinds of races.

From October 2008 to early February 2009, Didier rode for Danish Team CSC, and then moved home to Designa Køkken, also in Denmark. In 2009, he finished second at the Luxembourgish National Road Race Championships behind Andy Schleck and was also runner-up in the Luxembourgish National Time Trial Championships behind Kim Kirchen.

To most cycling experts it was considered a huge surprise that Didier was selected for the 2013 Tour de France, at the expense of former Belgian champion Stijn Devolder.

== Major results ==
2005
1st Road race, National Under-23 Road Championships
3rd Overall Flèche du Sud

1st Stage 3a

6th GP Möbel Alvisse
9th Overall Stuttgart–Straßburg
2006
8th Rund um Düren
2007
1st Saargau
1st Stage 2 Oberösterreich Rundfahrt
3rd Time trial, National Road Championships
8th Ronde van Overijssel
2009
National Road Championships

2nd Road race
2nd Time trial

6th Overall Tour de Normandie
2010
9th Overall Vuelta a la Comunidad de Madrid
2011
National Road Championships

3rd Road race
3rd Time trial

2012
1st Road race, National Road Championships
1st Mountains classification, Tour de Wallonie
2013
1st Mountains classification, Tour du Haut Var
2nd Time trial, National Road Championships
2014
1st Time trial, National Road Championships
1st Stage 5 USA Pro Challenge
2015
1st Stage 1 (TTT) Tour of Alberta
3rd Time trial, National Road Championships
2016
10th Overall Tour of Utah

=== Grand Tour general classification results timeline ===
| Grand Tour | 2010 | 2011 | 2012 | 2013 | 2014 | 2015 | 2016 | 2017 | 2018 |
|---|---|---|---|---|---|---|---|---|---|
| Giro d'Italia | 33 | 130 | — | — | — | — | 64 | DNF | 97 |
| Tour de France | — | — | — | 53 | — | DNF | — | — | — |
| Vuelta a España | — | — | 86 | — | — | — | 104 | — | — |

Legend
| — | Did not compete |
| DNF | Did not finish |
