= Cycling at the 2013 Games of the Small States of Europe =

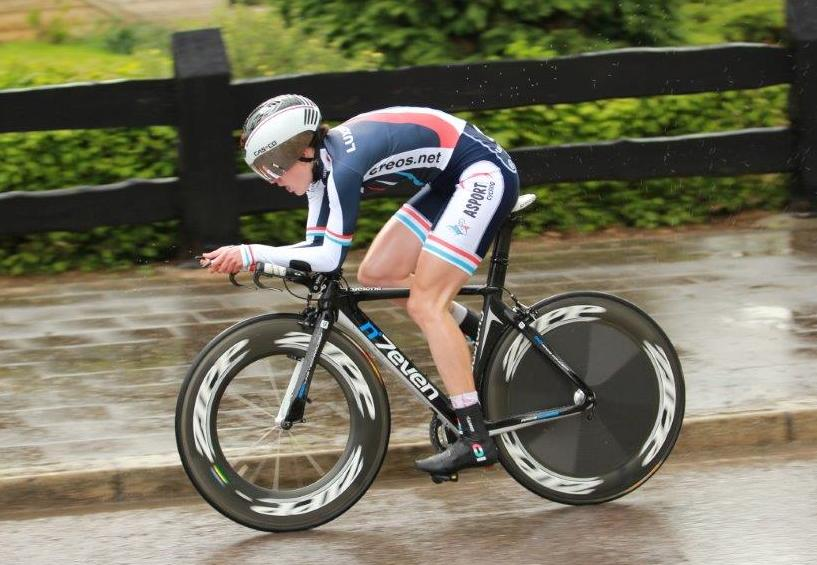
Christine Majerus, shown here competing in the time trial, won all three women's events

Cycling at the 2013 Games of the Small States of Europe was held from 28–31 May 2013 in Cessange, Luxembourg.

== Medal summary ==
=== Medal table ===
* Host nation (Luxembourg)

Rank	Nation	Gold	Silver	Bronze	Total
1	Luxembourg*	5	3	3	11
2	Liechtenstein	1	1	0	2
3	Cyprus	0	1	2	3
4	San Marino	0	1	1	2
Totals (4 entries)		6	6	6	18

=== Men ===
Event	Gold		Silver		Bronze	
Road race	Joël Zangerle (LUX)	3:07:41.852	Hans Burkhard (LIE)	3:14:51.087	Tom Thill (LUX)	3:14:52.632
Time trial	Stefan Küng (LIE)	26:41.31	Alex Kirsch (LUX)	27:43.74	Christian Helmig (LUX)	28:08.93
Mountain bike	Christian Helmig (LUX)	1:15:36	Marios Athanasiadis (CYP)	1:16:37	Christos Loizou (CYP)	1:19:10

=== Women ===
Event	Gold		Silver		Bronze	
Road race	Christine Majerus (LUX)	2:21:22.229	Nathalie Lamborelle (LUX)	2:21:53.554	Chantal Hoffmann (LUX)	2:21:54.150
Time trial	Christine Majerus (LUX)	15:02	Daniela Veronesi (SMR)	15:26	Antri Christoforou (CYP)	15:28
Mountain bike	Christine Majerus (LUX)	1:12:33	Isabelle Klein (LUX)	1:13:20	Daniela Veronesi (SMR)	1:14:50
