= Bob Jungels =

Luxembourgish road bicycle racer

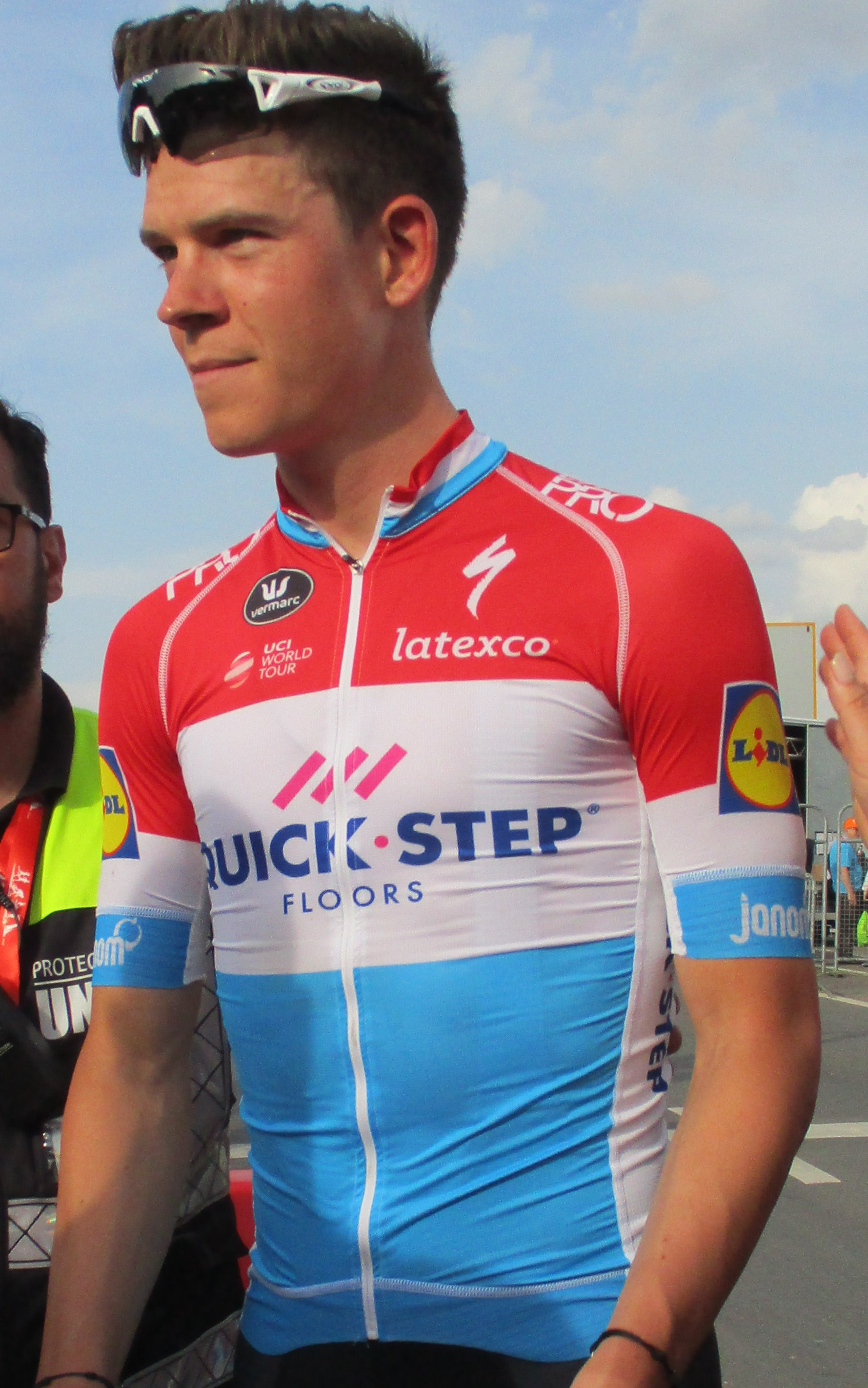
- Jungels, Ans. Liège–Bastogne–Liège, 2018.

Personal information
- Full name: Bob Jungels
- Born: 22 September 1992 (age 34) Luxembourg City, Luxembourg
- Height: 1.89 m (6 ft 2 1/2 in)
- Weight: 70 kg (154 lb; 11 st 0 lb)

Cycling career
- Sport: Cycling
- Current team: Netcompany–Ineos
- Discipline: Road
- Role: Rider
- Rider type: All-rounder

Amateur team
- 2011: UC Dippach

Professional teams
- 2012: Leopard–Trek Continental Team
- 2013–2015: RadioShack–Leopard
- 2016–2020: Etixx–Quick-Step
- 2021–2022: AG2R Citroën Team
- 2023–2024: Bora–Hansgrohe
- 2025–: INEOS Grenadiers

Major wins
- Grand Tours Tour de France 1 individual stage (2022) Giro d'Italia Young rider classification (2016, 2017) 1 individual stage (2017) One-day races and Classics National Road Race Championships (2013, 2015–2019) National Time Trial Championships (2013, 2015–2016, 2018–2020, 2022, 2025) Liège–Bastogne–Liège (2018) Kuurne–Brussels–Kuurne (2019)
Medal record
Men's road bicycle racing
Representing Luxembourg
World Championships
Gold medal – first place	2010 Offida	Junior time trial
Games of the Small States of Europe
Gold medal – first place	Liechtenstein 2011	Road Race
Gold medal – first place	Liechtenstein 2011	Time Trial
Representing Etixx–Quick-Step
World Championships
Gold medal – first place	2016 Doha	Team time trial
Gold medal – first place	2018 Innsbruck	Team time trial

Bob Jungels (born 22 September 1992) is a Luxembourgish road bicycle racer, who rides for UCI WorldTeam Netcompany–Ineos.

== Career ==
Born in Luxembourg City, Jungels competed in the Tour de France for the first time in 2015, as part of the UCI World Tour team Trek Factory Racing, finishing 27th overall and 5th in the young rider classification.

=== Etixx–Quick-Step (2016–20) ===
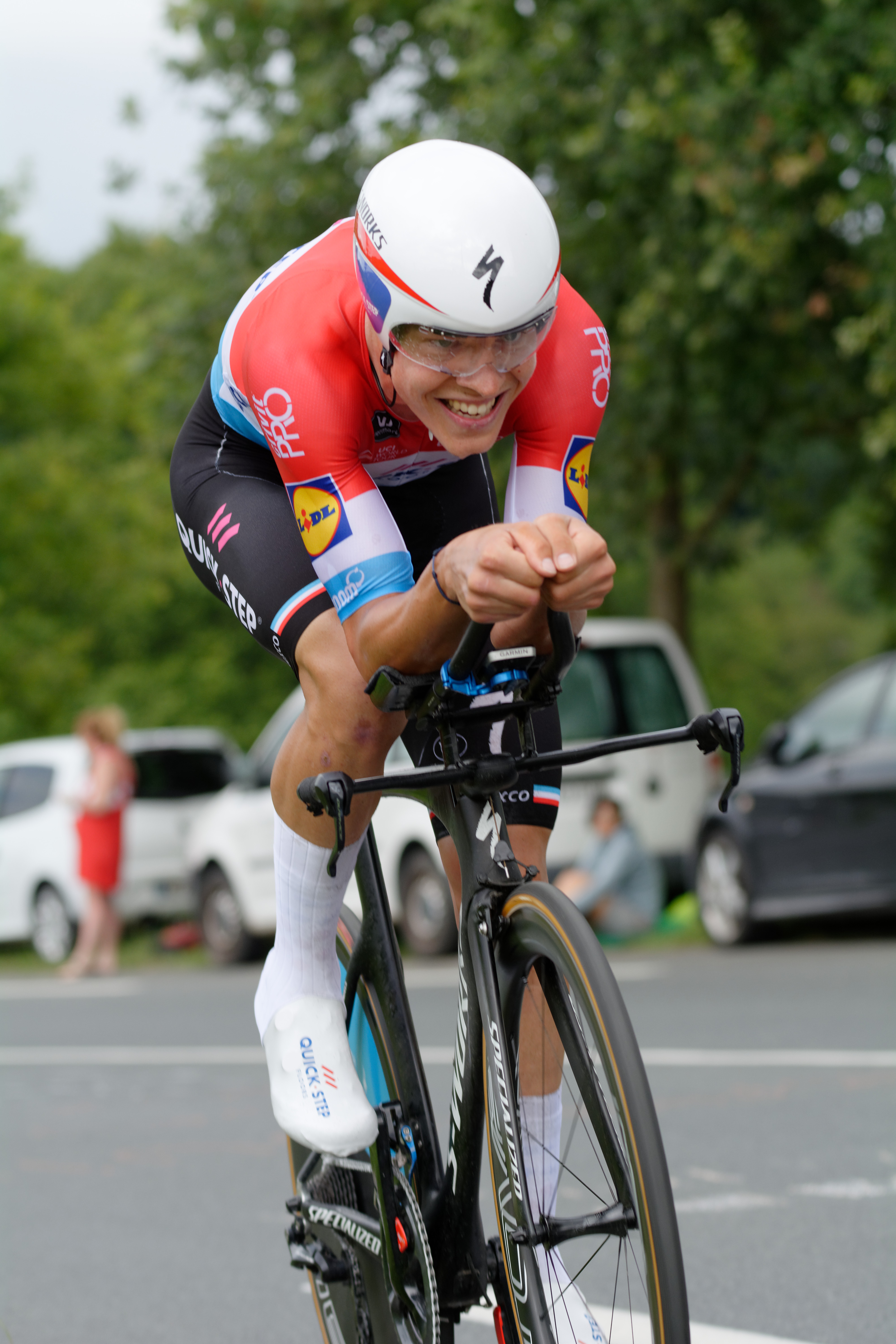
Jungels at the 2018 Tour de France

Jungels signed for Etixx–Quick-Step for the 2016 and 2017 seasons. He was named in the start list for the 2016 Giro d'Italia where he finished sixth overall and won the young rider classification.

In 2017 he confirmed his ambitions in the general classification by finishing 8th in the Giro d'Italia. He also defended the young rider classification from the previous edition. Only Vladimir Poulnikov and Pavel Tonkov won the classification in consecutive years before him. In the process he was able to take stage 15 and became the first rider from Luxembourg, since Charly Gaul 56 years earlier, to win at the Giro d'Italia.

In 2018, Jungels won Liège–Bastogne–Liège after a solo attack on the Côte de la Roche-aux-Faucons.

=== AG2R Citroën Team (2021–22) ===
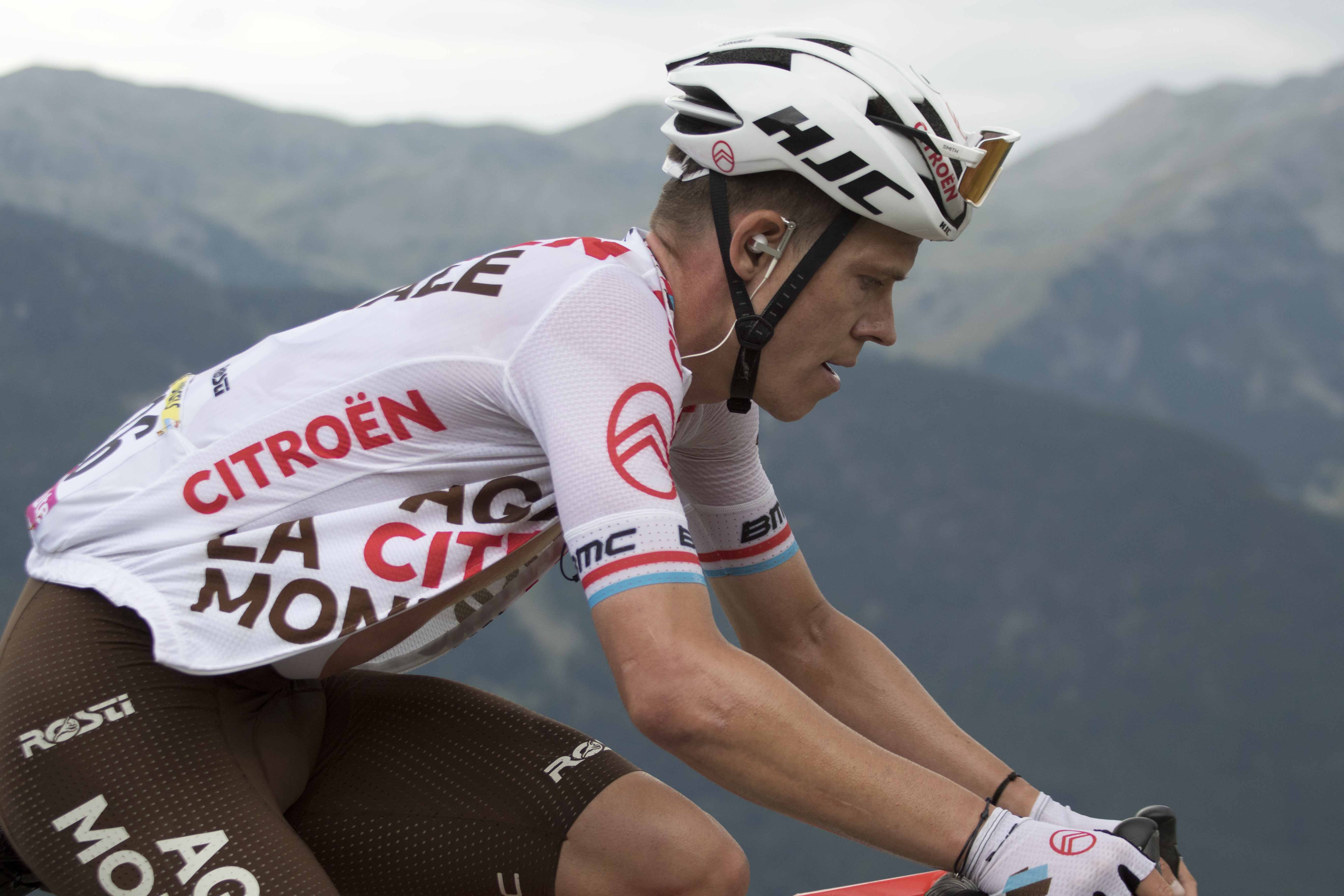
Jungels at the 2022 Tour de France

In August 2020, Jungels signed a two-year contract with the AG2R Citroën Team from the 2021 season.

His first season with the French squad was hampered first by a back injury and then a head injury suffered in a crash in the Amstel Gold Race. Then in June 2021 the team announced that he would miss the Tour de France and the COVID-19 pandemic-delayed 2020 Summer Olympics for surgery for iliac artery endofibrosis. He returned to competition after a 93-day absence at the Tour de Luxembourg in September.

Jungels regained his title at the Luxembourgish National Time Trial Championships in 2022, finishing around half a minute faster than any other competitor over the 13.6-kilometre (8.5-mile) course in Nospelt. Following this success, Jungels' next race was the Tour de France – prior to the race, he tested positive for COVID-19 on the two days prior to the opening individual time trial stage, but was allowed to compete by both the Union Cycliste Internationale (UCI) and race organisers Amaury Sport Organisation (ASO). After finishing in the top-ten placings in the sprint finish on stage eight, Jungels got into the breakaway on the following stage. On the day's third categorised climb, the Col de la Croix, Jungels attacked the breakaway group with 3 kilometres (1.9 miles) left to climb. Jungels eventually soloed to victory as the race returned to France, finishing 22 seconds clear of Jonathan Castroviejo in Châtel, to become the first cyclist from Luxembourg to win a stage since Andy Schleck in 2011. He ultimately finished the race in 12th place overall.

=== Bora–Hansgrohe (2022-24) ===
In August 2022, it was announced that Jungels was to join Bora–Hansgrohe for the 2023 season, on an initial two-year contract with an option for a further year.

=== Ineos Grenadiers ===
In August 2024, it was announced that Jungels was to join INEOS Grenadiers for the 2025 season, on a two-year contract. In August 2026, he announced his retirement from professional cycling on Instagram.

== Career achievements ==
=== Major results ===
Source:

=== Cyclo-cross ===
2008–2009
1st National Junior Championships
1st Junior Leudelange
1st Junior Niederanven
2009–2010
1st National Junior Championships

=== Road ===
2009
National Junior Championships

1st Road race
1st Time trial

2nd Time trial, UEC European Junior Championships
2nd Overall Grand Prix Rüebliland
4th Overall Tour de Lorraine

1st Stage 4 (ITT)

5th Overall 3-Etappen-Rundfahrt

1st Stage 1 (ITT)

2010
1st Time trial, UCI World Junior Championships
National Junior Championships

1st Road race
1st Time trial

1st Overall Grand Prix Rüebliland

1st Mountains classification
1st Points classification

1st Overall Vuelta al Besaya

1st Points classification
1st Stages 1 & 4

1st Overall Keizer der Juniores Koksijde

1st Stages 1 & 2a (ITT)

1st Overall 3-Etappen-Rundfahrt

1st Stage 1 (ITT)

1st Mountains classification, GP Général Patton
2nd Overall Trofeo Karlsberg
3rd Overall Niedersachsen Rundfahrt Juniors
2011
Games of the Small States of Europe

1st Road race
1st Time trial

National Under-23 Championships

1st Road race
1st Time trial

UEC European Under-23 Championships

2nd Time trial
10th Road race

3rd Overall Flèche du Sud

1st Young rider classification

2012 (1 pro win)
1st Time trial, National Under-23 Championships
1st Overall Flèche du Sud

1st Young rider classification
1st Stage 4 (ITT)

1st Overall Le Triptyque des Monts et Châteaux

1st Points classification

1st Paris–Roubaix Espoirs
1st Stage 4 Giro della Valle d'Aosta
2nd Time trial, UEC European Under-23 Championships
2nd Overall Giro della Regione Friuli Venezia Giulia

1st Young rider classification

2nd La Côte Picarde
7th Chrono Champenois
8th Overall Toscana-Terra di Ciclismo
9th Overall Tour de Luxembourg
2013 (4)
National Championships

1st Road race
1st Time trial

1st Gran Premio Nobili Rubinetterie
5th Overall Tour de Luxembourg

1st Stage 4

2014
2nd Time trial, National Championships
9th Overall Critérium International
Combativity award Stage 17 Vuelta a España
2015 (4)
National Championships

1st Road race
1st Time trial

1st Overall Étoile de Bessèges

1st Stage 5 (ITT)

6th Overall Tour de Suisse
10th Overall Vuelta a Andalucía
2016 (3)
UCI World Championships

1st Team time trial
10th Time trial

National Championships

1st Road race
1st Time trial

1st Stage 1 Tour of Oman
3rd Overall Tirreno–Adriatico

1st Young rider classification

6th Overall Giro d'Italia

1st Young rider classification
Held after Stages 10–12

10th Overall Eneco Tour
2017 (2)
National Championships

1st Road race
2nd Time trial

1st Young rider classification, Tirreno–Adriatico
8th Overall Giro d'Italia

1st Young rider classification
1st Stage 15
Held after Stages 4–8

8th Overall Tour de Romandie
2018 (4)
1st Team time trial, UCI World Championships
National Championships

1st Road race
1st Time trial

1st Liège–Bastogne–Liège
1st Prologue Okolo Slovenska
3rd La Drôme Classic
5th Overall Volta ao Algarve
5th Overall Tour of Britain
7th Vuelta a Murcia
2019 (4)
National Championships

1st Road race
1st Time trial

1st Kuurne–Brussels–Kuurne
1st Stage 4 Tour Colombia
3rd Dwars door Vlaanderen
5th E3 Binckbank Classic
8th Overall Paris–Nice
2020 (1)
National Championships

1st Time trial
2nd Road race

2022 (2)
1st Time trial, National Championships
1st Stage 9 Tour de France
6th Overall Tour de Suisse
2025 (1)
1st Time trial, National Championships
1st Stage 1 Tour of Austria
Combativity award Stage 13 Vuelta a España

==== General classification results timeline ====
Grand Tour general classification results
Grand Tour	2014	2015	2016	2017	2018	2019	2020	2021	2022	2023	2024
Giro d'Italia	—	—	6	8	—	33	—	—	—	39	—
Tour de France	—	27	—	—	11	—	43	—	12	26	37
Vuelta a España	DNF	—	—	42	—	—	—	—	51	—	—
Major stage race general classification results
Race	2014	2015	2016	2017	2018	2019	2020	2021	2022	2023	2024
Paris–Nice	18	23	—	—	—	8	15	27	—	19	34
Tirreno–Adriatico	—	—	3	14	18	—	—	—	23	—	—
Volta a Catalunya	—	—	—	—	24	—	NH	59	—	—	—
Tour of the Basque Country	57	31	—	—	—	—	NH	—	—	—	91
Tour de Romandie	—	—	DNF	8	—	—	NH	—	61	42	—
Critérium du Dauphiné	86	—	—	—	25	—	42	—	—	—	40
Tour de Suisse	—	6	—	—	—	—	NH	19	6	—	—

==== Classics results timeline ====
Monument	2013	2014	2015	2016	2017	2018	2019	2020	2021	2022	2023	2024
Milan–San Remo	—	87	—	—	—	—	—	73	—	52	—	—
Tour of Flanders	—	—	—	—	—	—	16	—	—	56	—	—
Paris–Roubaix	84	—	—	—	—	—	—	NH	—	—	—	—
Liège–Bastogne–Liège	—	62	82	—	—	1	—	94	—	58	—	45
Giro di Lombardia	—	—	—	—	DNF	DNF	52	—	—	—	67	DNF
Classic	2013	2014	2015	2016	2017	2018	2019	2020	2021	2022	2023	2024
Omloop Het Nieuwsblad	—	—	—	—	—	—	16	32	—	—	—	126
Kuurne–Brussels–Kuurne	NH	—	—	—	—	—	1	55	—	—	—	98
Strade Bianche	—	—	—	17	DNF	—	—	DNF	—	—	—	—
E3 Harelbeke	—	—	—	—	—	—	5	NH	—	65	—	—
Dwars door Vlaanderen	DNF	—	—	—	—	—	3	NH	—	70	—	—
Amstel Gold Race	—	38	23	43	39	33	—	NH	DNF	—	—	33
La Flèche Wallonne	—	143	DNF	66	39	41	—	70	—	78	—	DNF
Clásica de San Sebastián	16	—	80	84	—	52	—	NH	—	—	DNF	—

Legend
—	Did not compete
DNF	Did not finish
IP	In progress
NH	Not held

=== Honours and awards ===
In 2010, Jungels was the winner of the Prix du Jeune Espoir Luxembourgeois. In 2018, Jungels was the men's winner at the Luxembourgish Sportspeople of the Year awards.
