= Steve Fogen =

Luxembourgish cyclist

Personal information
- Born: 28 September 1979 (age 47) Esch-sur-Alzette, Luxembourg

Cycling career
- Sport: Cycling
- Current team: Retired
- Discipline: Road
- Role: Rider

Professional teams
- 2000: Cofidis (stagiaire)
- 2007: Differdange
- 2008: Preti Mangimi

Steve Fogen (born 28 September 1979 in Esch-sur-Alzette) is a Luxembourgish cyclist.

== Palmares ==
1997
1st Junior National Cyclo-cross Championships
1998
2nd National Cyclo-cross Championships
1999
2nd U23 National Cyclo-cross Championships
3rd National Time Trial Championships
2000
1st National Time Trial Championships
1st National Cyclo-cross Championships
2001
1st Chrono Champenois
1st Stages 3b & 4 Flèche du Sud
2nd Games of the Small States of Europe Time Trial
2nd U23 National Cyclo-cross Championships
3rd Games of the Small States of Europe Road race
2002
2nd National Time Trial Championships
3rd Overall Flèche du Sud
3rd National Road Race Championships
