= Alex Kirsch =

Luxembourgish cyclist (born 1992)

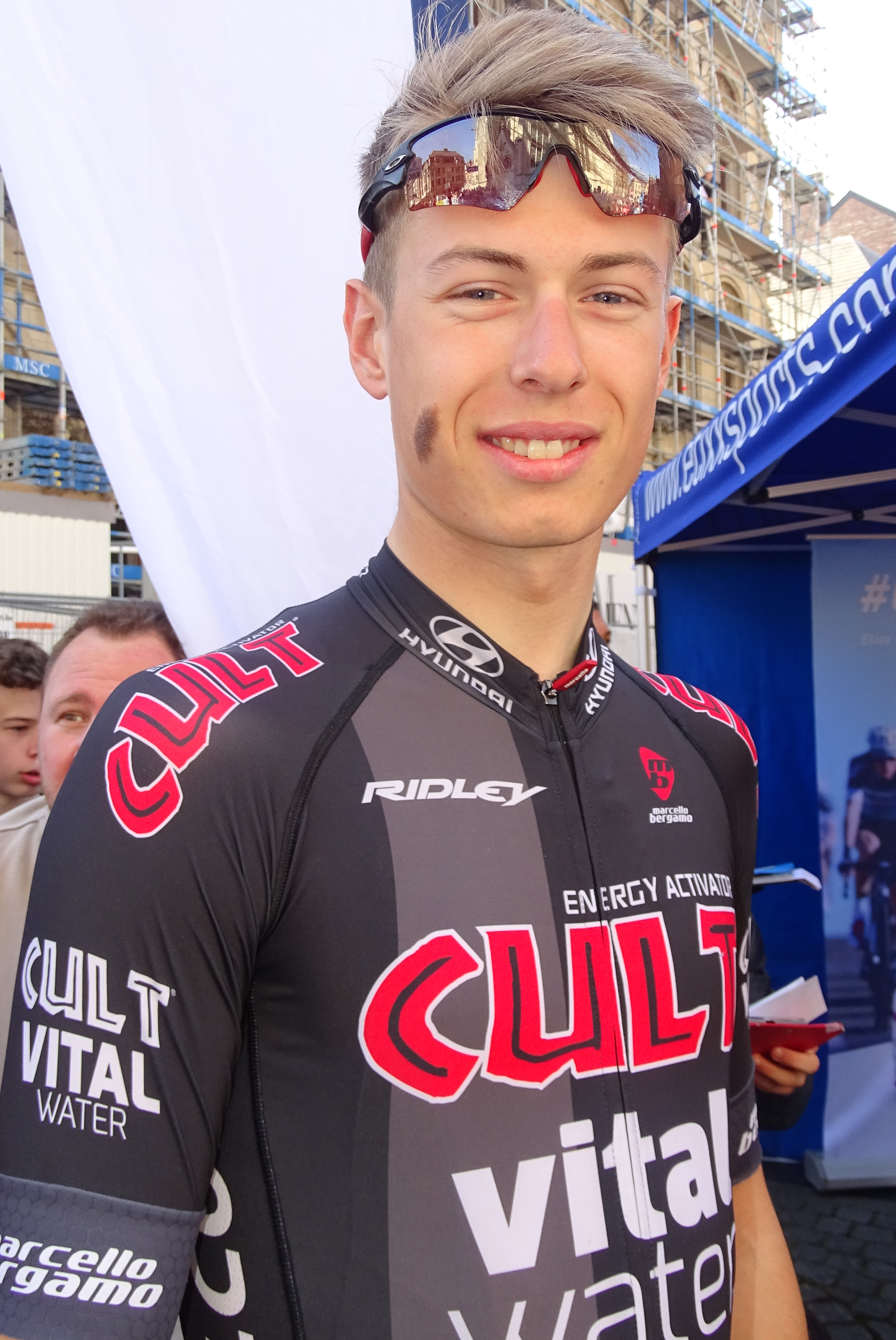
- Kirsch in April 2015

Personal information
- Full name: Alex Kirsch
- Born: 12 June 1992 (age 34) Luxembourg City, Luxembourg
- Height: 1.94 m (6 ft 4 in)
- Weight: 75 kg (165 lb)

Cycling career
- Sport: Cycling
- Current team: Lidl–Trek
- Discipline: Road
- Role: Rider

Amateur team
- 2011: UC Dippach

Professional teams
- 2012–2014: Leopard–Trek Continental Team
- 2014: Trek Factory Racing (stagiaire)
- 2015: Cult Energy Pro Cycling
- 2016: Stölting Service Group
- 2017–2018: WB Veranclassic Aqua Protect
- 2019–2025: Trek–Segafredo
- 2026: Cofidis

Major wins
- One-day races and Classics National Road Race Championships (2023) National Time Trial Championships (2023, 2026)
Medal record
Representing Luxembourg
Men's road cycling
Games of the Small States of Europe
| Gold medal – first place | Andorra la Vella 2025 | Team road race |
| Silver medal – second place | Luxembourg 2013 | Time trial |
| Silver medal – second place | Andorra la Vella 2025 | Time trial |
| Silver medal – second place | Andorra la Vella 2025 | Road race |

Alex Kirsch (born 12 June 1992 in Luxembourg City) is a Luxembourgish cyclist, who currently rides for UCI ProSeries Team Cofidis. He was the 2023 Luxembourg National Champion in both the Road Race and Time Trial, and has competed in the Tour de France, Giro d'Italia and Vuelta a España.

== Major results ==
2012
1st Road race, National Under-23 Road Championships
2013
National Under-23 Road Championships

1st Road race
1st Time trial

1st Stage 1 (TTT) Czech Cycling Tour
1st Mountains classification, Flèche du Sud
2014
National Under-23 Road Championships

1st Road race
1st Time trial

3rd Time trial, National Road Championships
3rd Overall Le Triptyque des Monts et Châteaux
7th Ronde Van Vlaanderen Beloften
9th Overall Tour de Normandie
10th Ster van Zwolle
2016
National Road Championships

2nd Road race
3rd Time trial

3rd Overall Tour de Luxembourg
6th Overall Istrian Spring Trophy
2017
National Road Championships

2nd Road race
3rd Time trial

2nd Le Samyn
9th Overall Ster ZLM Toer
9th Binche–Chimay–Binche
2018
National Road Championships

2nd Time trial
2nd Road race

6th Le Samyn
9th Tour de l'Eurométropole
2019
8th Grand Prix d'Isbergues
2020
2nd Time trial, National Road Championships
7th Le Samyn
2021
National Road Championships

3rd Time trial
4th Road race

2023 (2 pro wins)
National Road Championships

1st Road race
1st Time trial

2024
3rd Overall Tour de Wallonie
5th Overall Tour de la Provence
10th Road race, UEC European Road Championships
10th E3 Saxo Classic
2026 (1 pro win)
National Road Championships

1st Time trial

=== Grand Tour general classification results timeline ===
| Grand Tour | 2019 | 2020 | 2021 | 2022 | 2023 | 2026 |
|---|---|---|---|---|---|---|
| Giro d'Italia | — | — | — | — | 96 | |
| Tour de France | — | — | — | DNF | 115 | 122 |
| Vuelta a España | 125 | — | 120 | 119 | DNF | — |

Legend
| — | Did not compete |
| DNF | Did not finish |
