= Luxembourgish National Time Trial Championships =

National road cycling championship in Luxembourg

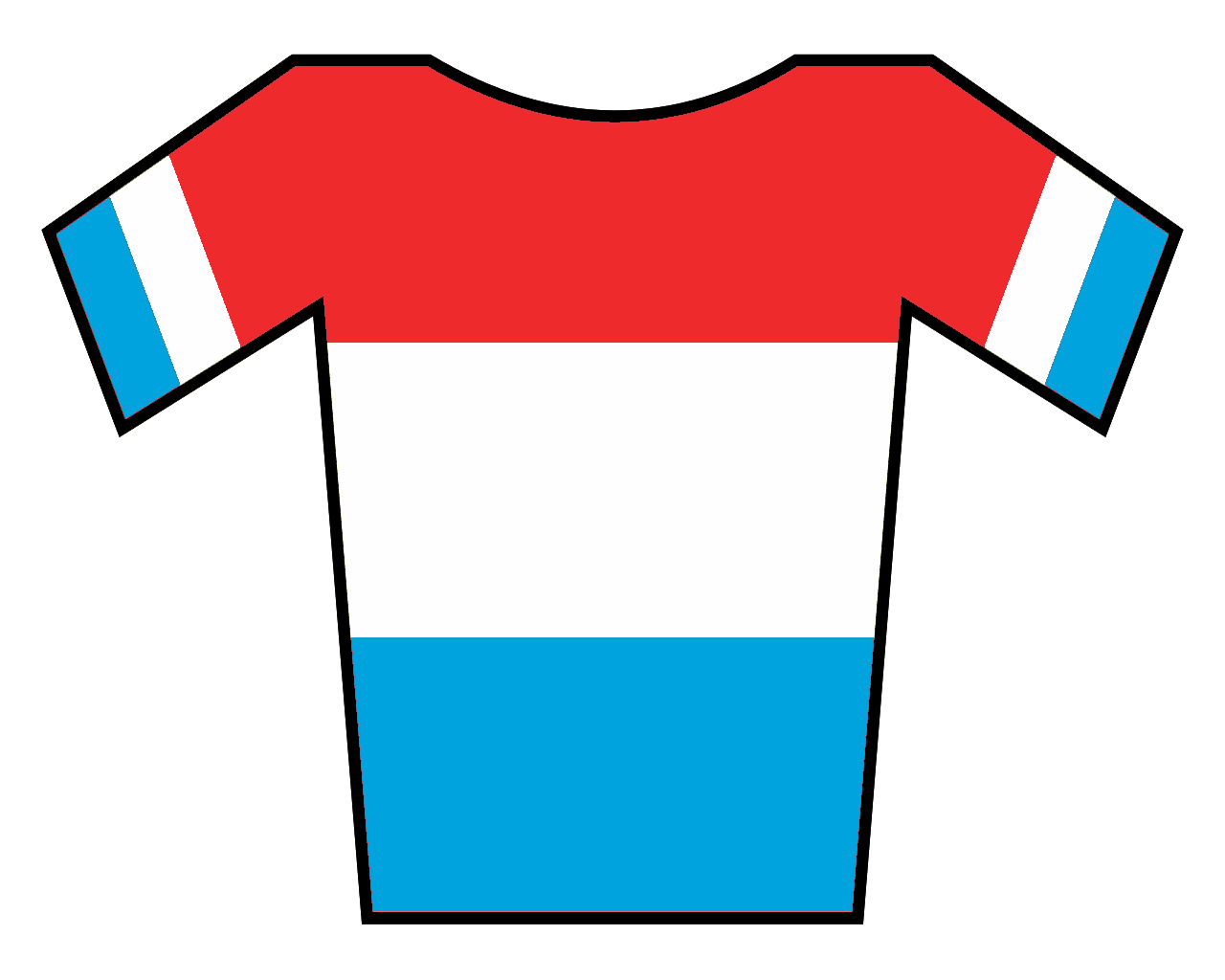
The champion's jersey

The Luxembourgish National Time Trial Championship is a time trial race that takes place inside the Luxembourgish National Cycling Championship, and decides the best cyclist in this type of race. The first edition took place in 1999 as a men's only competition, won by Christian Poos. Bob Jungels holds the record for the most wins in the men's championship with seven. The women's record is held by Christine Majerus with sixteen wins, including every year following the initial women's championship in 2006.

== Multiple winners ==
Wins	Name	Years
16	Christine Majerus	2007, 2008, 2009, 2010, 2011, 2012, 2013, 2014, 2015, 2016, 2017, 2018, 2019, 2020, 2021, 2022
7	Bob Jungels	2013, 2015, 2016, 2018, 2019, 2020, 2022
5	Christian Poos	1999, 2002, 2003, 2007, 2011
2	Benoît Joachim	2004, 2006
2	Andy Schleck	2005, 2010
2	Kim Kirchen	2008, 2009

== Men ==
=== Elite ===
Year	Gold	Silver	Bronze
1999	Christian Poos	Benoît Joachim	Steve Fogen
2000	Steve Fogen	Kim Kirchen	Fränk Schleck
2001	Marc Vanacker	Kim Kirchen	Vincenzo Centrone
2002	Christian Poos	Steve Fogen	Marc Vanacker
2003	Christian Poos	Pascal Triebel	Marc Vanacker
2004	Benoît Joachim	Pascal Triebel	Steve Fries
2005	Andy Schleck	Pascal Triebel	Daniel Bintz
2006	Benoît Joachim	Christian Poos	Steve Fries
2007	Christian Poos	Andy Schleck	Laurent Didier
2008	Kim Kirchen	Christian Poos	Benoît Joachim
2009	Kim Kirchen	Laurent Didier	Christian Poos
2010	Andy Schleck	Fränk Schleck	Christian Poos
2011	Christian Poos	Ralph Diseviscourt	Laurent Didier
2012	Ben Gastauer (Note: Although Bob Jungels recorded the best time for the time trial, he was eligible for Under-23 honours only.)	Ralph Diseviscourt	Christian Helmig
2013	Bob Jungels	Laurent Didier	Ben Gastauer
2014	Laurent Didier	Bob Jungels	Alex Kirsch
2015	Bob Jungels	Jempy Drucker	Laurent Didier
2016	Bob Jungels	Jempy Drucker	Alex Kirsch
2017	Jempy Drucker	Bob Jungels	Alex Kirsch
2018	Bob Jungels	Alex Kirsch	Tom Thill
2019	Bob Jungels	Tom Wirtgen	Ivan Centrone
2020	Bob Jungels	Alex Kirsch	Kevin Geniets
2021	Kevin Geniets	Michel Ries	Alex Kirsch
2022	Bob Jungels	Michel Ries	Tim Diederich

=== U23 ===
Year	Gold	Silver	Bronze
2003	Ronny Kremer	Joe Kirch	Marc Ernster
2004	Andy Schleck	Claude Wolter	Benn Würth
2005	Laurent Didier	Nick Clesen	Joe Kirch
2006	Nick Clesen	David Battestini	Ben Gastauer
2007	Kim Michely	Ben Gastauer	Cyrille Heymans
2008	Ben Gastauer	Kim Michely	Tom Kohn
2009	Ben Gastauer	Tom Thill	Pit Schlechter
2010	Tom Thill	Tom Kohn	Ivo Lux
2011	Bob Jungels	Tom Thill	Pit Schlechter
2012	Bob Jungels	Pit Schlechter	Tom Thill
2013	Alex Kirsch	Mike Diener	Massimo Morabito
2014	Alex Kirsch	Luc Turchi	Kevin Feiereisen
2015	Tom Wirtgen	Luc Turchi	Larry Valvasori
2016	Kevin Geniets	Luc Turchi	Jan Petelin
2017	Tom Wirtgen	Michel Ries	Ivan Centrone
2018	Tom Wirtgen	Pit Leyder	Michel Ries
2019	Kevin Geniets	Raphaël Kockelmann	Pit Leyder
2020	Michel Ries	Raphaël Kockelmann	Arthur Kluckers
2021	Arthur Kluckers	Loïc Bettendorff	Raphaël Kockelmann
2022	Arthur Kluckers	Mats Wenzel	Loïc Bettendorff

== Women ==
=== Elite ===
Year	Gold	Silver	Bronze
2006	Anne-Marie Schmitt	Isabelle Hoffmann	Nathalie Lamborelle
2007	Christine Majerus	Anne-Marie Schmitt	Christine Kovelter
2008	Christine Majerus	Nathalie Lamborelle	Anne-Marie Schmitt
2009	Christine Majerus	Anne-Marie Schmitt	Nathalie Lamborelle
2010	Christine Majerus	Anne-Marie Schmitt	Nathalie Lamborelle
2011	Christine Majerus	Anne-Marie Schmitt	Nathalie Lamborelle
2012	Christine Majerus	Anne-Marie Schmitt	Nathalie Lamborelle
2013	Christine Majerus	Nathalie Lamborelle	Chantal Hoffmann
2014	Christine Majerus	Chantal Hoffmann	Elise Maes
2015	Christine Majerus	Elise Maes	Chantal Hoffmann
2016	Christine Majerus	Anne-Sophie Harsch	Elise Maes
2017	Christine Majerus	Elise Maes	Chantal Hoffmann
2018	Christine Majerus	Elise Maes	Pia Wiltgen
2019	Christine Majerus	Pia Wiltgen	Liz Asselborn
2020	Christine Majerus	Mia Berg	Pia Wiltgen
2021	Christine Majerus	Carmen Coljon	Mia Berg
2022	Christine Majerus	No other elite riders	

== See also ==
- Luxembourgish National Road Race Championships
- National road cycling championships
