= Pit Leyder =

Luxembourgish cyclist (born 1997)

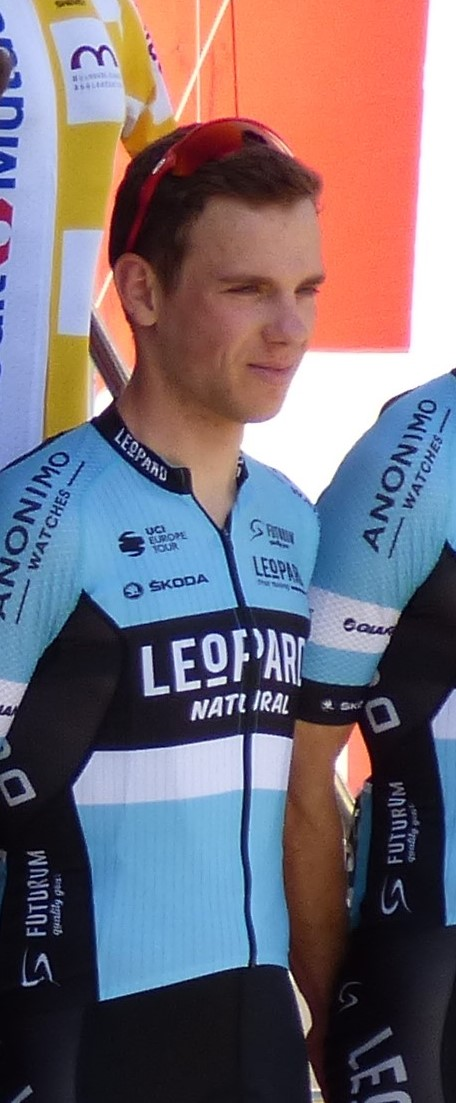
- Leyder in 2019

Personal information
- Full name: Pit Leyder
- Born: 11 January 1997 (age 29) Bettendorf, Luxembourg

Cycling career
- Sport: Cycling
- Current team: Retired
- Discipline: Road
- Role: Rider

Professional teams
- 2016–2019: Leopard Pro Cycling
- 2019: Cofidis (stagiaire)
Medal record
Representing Luxembourg
Men's road cycling
Games of the Small States of Europe
Gold medal – first place	San Marino 2017	Road race

Pit Leyder (born 11 January 1997) is a Luxembourgish former professional cyclist, who rode professionally between 2016 and 2019 for Leopard Pro Cycling and for the Cofidis team in 2019, as a stagiaire.

== Major results ==
2015
National Junior Road Championships

3rd Road race
3rd Time trial

10th Road race, UCI Junior Road World Championships
2017
1st Road race, Games of the Small States of Europe
9th Ronde van Vlaanderen U23
2018
National Under-23 Road Championships

1st Road race
2nd Time trial

3rd Overall Tour de Luxembourg

1st Young rider classification

6th Flèche Ardennaise
8th Overall Flèche du Sud
10th Road race, UEC European Under-23 Road Championships
2019
3rd Road race, National Road Championships
3rd Time trial, National Under-23 Road Championships
4th Ronde van Vlaanderen U23
7th Eschborn–Frankfurt Under–23
