= Leopard TOGT Pro Cycling =

Danish cycling team

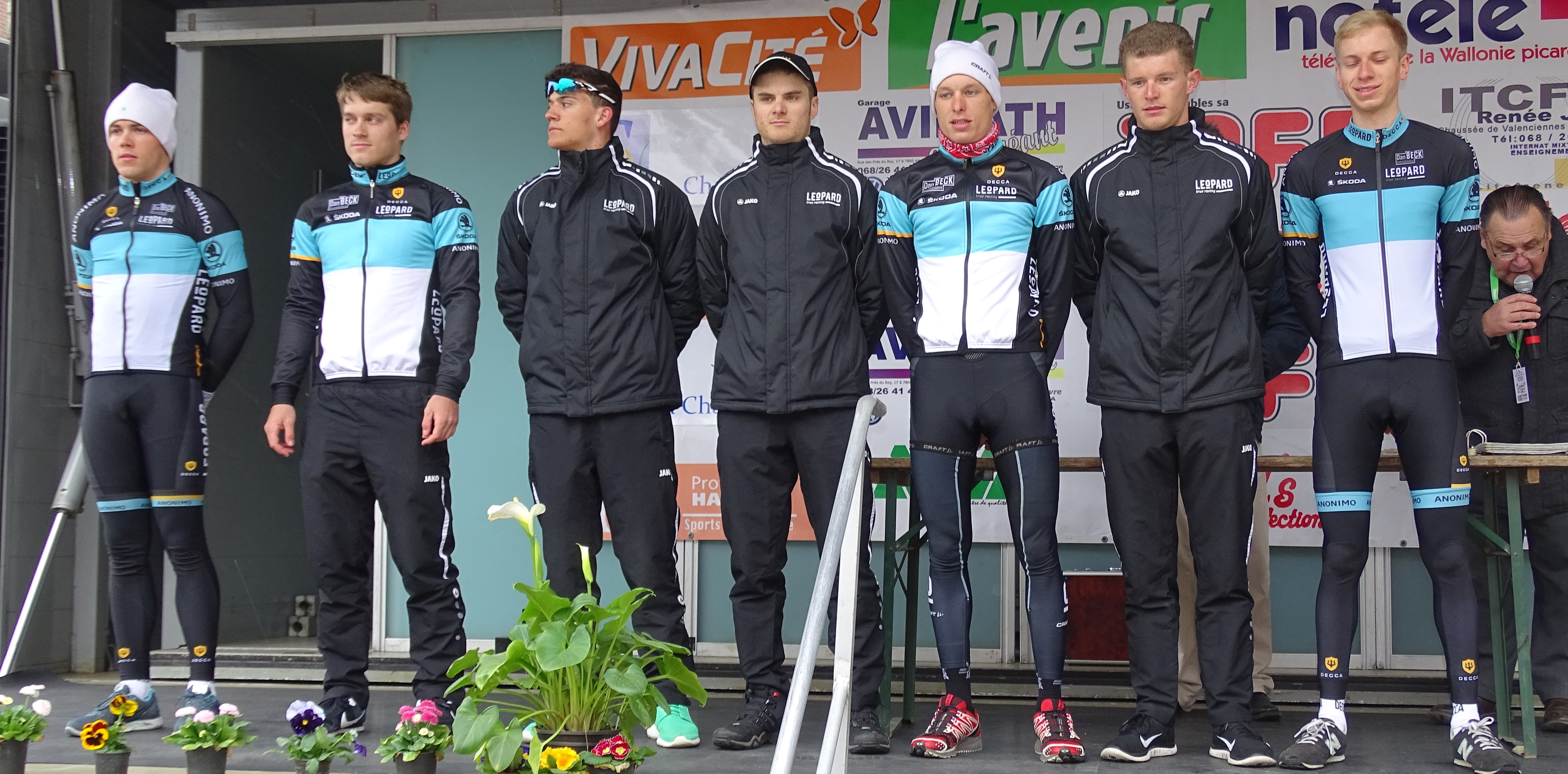

Team information
- UCI code: LTP
- Registered: Luxembourg (2012–2022); Denmark (2023–)
- Founded: 2012
- Discipline: Road
- Status: UCI Continental
- Bicycles: Giant

Key personnel
- General manager: Markus Zingen
- Team managers: Jan Brockhoff; Lennart Klein; Gaëtan Pons; Gregor Willwohl

Team name history
- 2012–2013 2014–2015 2016–2022 2023–: Leopard-Trek Continental Team (LET); Leopard Development Team (LDT); Leopard Pro Cycling (LPC); Leopard TOGT Pro Cycling (LTP)

Leopard TOGT Pro Cycling is a Danish based team that acts as a development team for professional road racing cyclists. It was founded in 2012 as Leopard-Trek Continental, and merged in 2023 with the Danish Riwal Cycling Team to form Leopard TOGT Pro Cycling. It was previously a team registered in Luxembourg but after the merge represented Denmark.

== Team roster ==
As of 12 March 2023.

Rider	Date of birth
Tobias Hansen (DEN)	10 March 2002 (age 24)
Loïc Bettendorff (LUX)	28 April 2001 (age 25)
Mathias Bregnhøj (DEN)	11 November 1995 (age 30)
Miguel Heidemann (GER)	27 January 1998 (age 28)
Colin Heiderscheid (LUX)	28 January 1998 (age 28)
Oliver Knudsen (DEN)	8 January 1999 (age 27)
Mads Østergaard Kristensen (DEN)	26 January 1998 (age 28)
Mil Morang (LUX)	15 September 2004 (age 21)
Tom Paquet (LUX)	28 June 2002 (age 24)

Rider	Date of birth
Cedric Pries (LUX)	25 October 2000 (age 25)
Robin Juel Skivild (DEN)	21 August 2001 (age 25)
Andreas Stokbro (DEN)	8 April 1997 (age 29)
Kasper Viberg Søgaard (DEN)	12 September 2001 (age 24)
Tim Torn Teutenberg (GER)	19 June 2002 (age 24)
Nick van der Lijke (NED)	23 September 1991 (age 34)
Emil Vinjebo (DEN)	24 March 1994 (age 32)
Mats Wenzel (LUX)	19 December 2002 (age 23)

== Major wins ==
2012
Dorpenomloop Rucphen, Giorgio Brambilla
Overall Triptyque des Monts et Châteaux, Bob Jungels
GP Commune de Sanem, Joël Zangerlé
Overall Flèche du Sud, Bob Jungels

Stage 3, Julian Kern
Stage 4, Bob Jungels

Paris–Roubaix U23, Bob Jungels
Luxembourg National Time Trial Championships, Bob Jungels
Portugal National U23 Time Trial Championships, Fábio Silvestre
Moldova National Road Race Championships, Alexandre Pliuschin
Luxembourg National U23 Road Race Championships, Alex Kirsch
Stage 4 Giro della Valle d'Aosta, Bob Jungels

2013
Stage 1 Tour de Normandie, Fábio Silvestre
Overall Triptyque des Monts et Châteaux, Fábio Silvestre
Stage 4 Circuit des Ardennes, Fábio Silvestre
GP Marc Angel, Pit Schlechter
U23 Provincial Road Championship Flemish Brabant, Sean De Bie
Stage 4 Tour de Azerbaijan, Jan Hirt
Stage 1 Flèche du Sud, Kristian Haugaard Jensen
Omloop der Kempen, Eugenio Alafaci
Games of the Small States of Europe Road Race, Joël Zangerlé
Festival Cycliste Schifflange, Tom Thill
Stage 4 Ronde de l'Oise, Fábio Silvestre
Stage 1 (TTT) Czech Cycling Tour
European Championship U23 Road Race, Sean De Bie
Team Designa Køkken Criterium, Kristian Haugaard Jensen
TT Preizendaul, Pit Schlechter
Stages 1 & 5 Tour of China, Daniel Klemme

2014
Ronde van Overijssel, Dennis Coenen

2017
Luxembourg National U23 Time Trial Championships, Tom Wirtgen
Stage 2 International Tour of Rhodes, Szymon Rekita
Stage 3b Le Triptyque des Monts et Chateaux, Aksel Nōmmela

2018
Stage 1 Tour du Jura Cycliste, Szymon Rekita
Overall Carpathian Couriers Race, Filip Maciejuk
Luxembourg National U23 Time Trial Championships, Pit Leyder

2019
Overall Tour of Antalya, Szymon Rekita
Stage 3 Tour of Antalya, Szymon Rekita

2020
Germany National U23 Time Trial Championships, Miguel Heidemann

2021
Luxembourg National U23 Time Trial Championships, Arthur Kluckers
Luxembourg National U23 Road Race Championships, Arthur Kluckers

2022
Stage 4 Tour Alsace, Arthur Kluckers
Luxembourg National Road Race Championships, Colin Heiderscheid
Luxembourg National U23 Time Trial Championships, Arthur Kluckers
Stage 5 Flèche du Sud, Arthur Kluckers

2023
Luxembourg National U23 Road Race Championships, Loïc Bettendorff
Gylne Gutuer, Andreas Stokbro
Stage 2 Flèche du Sud, Mathias Bregnhøj
Stage 3 Le Tour de Bretagne Cycliste, Mads Østergaard Kristensen
Overall Circuit des Ardennes, Mathias Bregnhøj
Stage 2 Circuit des Ardennes, Mathias Bregnhøj
Overall Olympia's Tour, Mathias Bregnhøj
Mountains classification Olympia's Tour, Mathias Bregnhøj
Grand Prix de la Ville de Lillers Souvenir Bruno Comini, Andreas Stokbro
