= Le Triptyque des Monts et Châteaux =

Belgian multi-day road cycling race

Race details
- Date: Early April
- Region: Belgium
- Local name: Le Triptyque des Monts et Châteaux
- Discipline: Road race
- Type: Stage Race
- Web site: www.petitereinefrasnoise.be

History
- First edition: 1996
- Editions: 25 (as of 2022)
- First winner: Davy Dubbeldam (NED)
- Most wins: Sébastien Rosseler (BEL); Jasper Philipsen (BEL); (2 wins)
- Most recent: Enzo Paleni (FRA)

Le Triptyque des Monts et Châteaux is a Belgian cycling road race. It was first held in 1996. Since 2005, the race has been organised as a 2.2 event on the UCI Europe Tour.

== List of winners ==
Year	Country	Rider	Team
1996	Netherlands	Davy Dubbeldam	
1997	Belgium	Michel Vermote	
1998	Netherlands	Marcel Duijn	
1999	Australia	Mathew Hayman	
2000	Belgium	Stijn Devolder	ASLK-Fortis Boys
2001	Kazakhstan	Andrei Kashechkin	Domo-Farm Frites
2002	Belgium	Sébastien Rosseler	Domo-Farm Frites
2003	Belgium	Sébastien Rosseler	Quick Step-Davitamon-Latexco
2004	Netherlands	Thomas Dekker	Rabobank TT III
2005	Netherlands	Marc De Maar	Rabobank Continental Team
2006	Netherlands	Lars Boom	Rabobank Continental Team
2007	Netherlands	Tom Leezer	Rabobank Continental Team
2008	Belgium	Thomas De Gendt	Cycling Team Davo
2009	Belgium	Kris Boeckmans	Davo-Lotto-Davitamon
2010	Netherlands	Jetse Bol	Rabobank Continental Team
2011	Netherlands	Tom Dumoulin	Rabobank Continental Team
2012	Luxembourg	Bob Jungels	Leopard-Trek Continental Team
2013	Portugal	Fábio Silvestre	Leopard-Trek Continental Team
2014	Great Britain	Owain Doull	Great Britain national team
2015	France	Lilian Calmejane	Vendée U
2016	Denmark	Mads Würtz Schmidt	Team TreFor
2017	Belgium	Jasper Philipsen	BMC Development Team
2018	Belgium	Jasper Philipsen	Hagens Berman Axeon
2019	Denmark	Mikkel Bjerg	Hagens Berman Axeon
2020–2021	No race due to Covid-19 pandemic		
2022	France	Enzo Paleni	Équipe Continentale Groupama–FDJ
