= Team Differdange–Geba =

Luxembourg cycling team

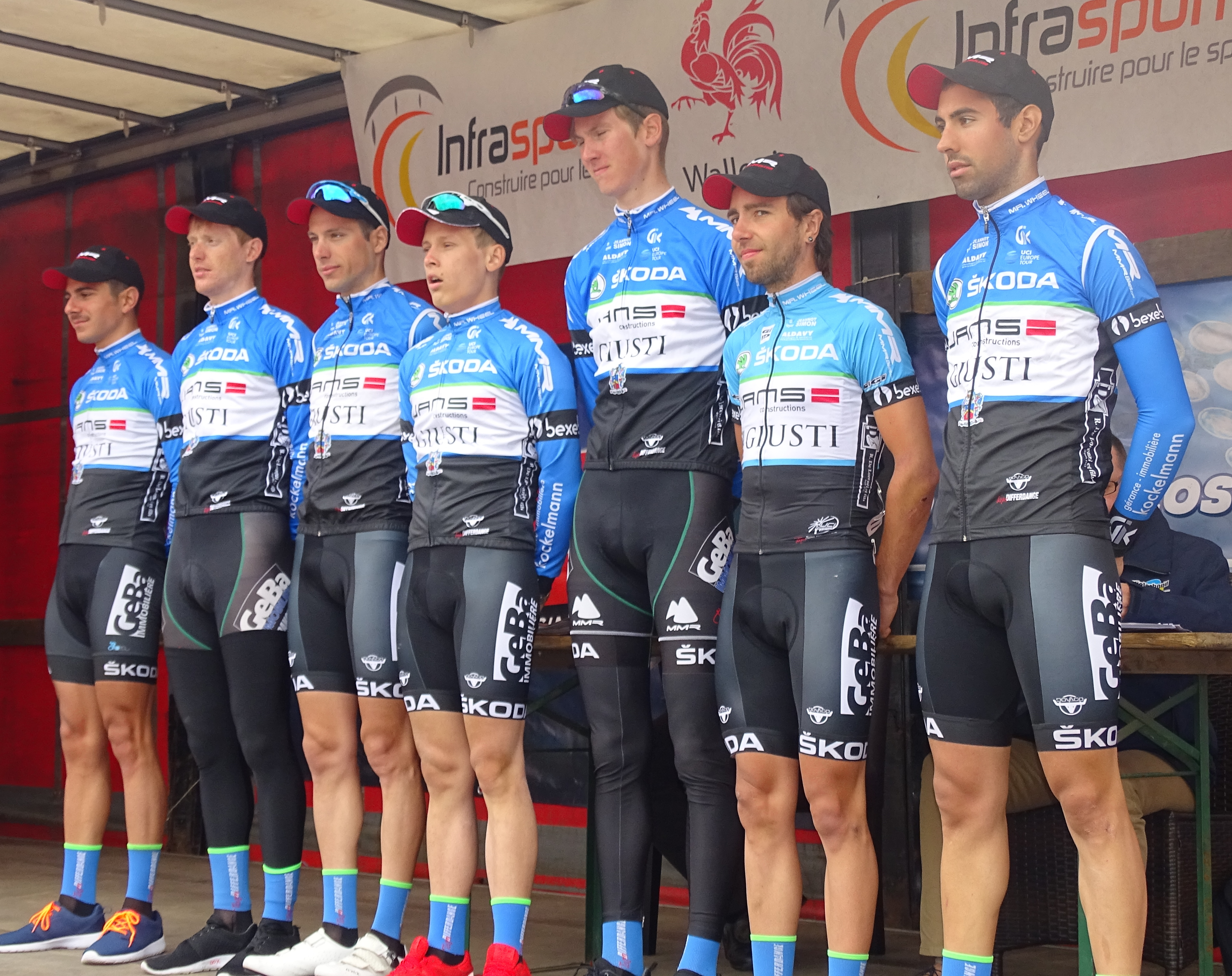

Team information
- UCI code: CCD
- Registered: Luxembourg
- Founded: 2006
- Discipline: Road
- Status: Continental

Key personnel
- Team managers: Detlef Kurzweg; Edmond Schroeder

Team name history
- 2006–2007 2008 2009–2010 2011–2012 2013–2018 2019–: Continental Team Differdange; Differdange–Apiflo Vacances; Continental Team Differdange; Differdange–Magic-SportFood.de; Differdange–Losch; Team Differdange–Geba

Team Differdange–Geba (UCI team code: CCD) is a continental cycling team, based in Luxembourg. The team participates in UCI Continental Circuits races.

== Major wins ==
2006
GP Demy-Cars, Fredrik Johansson
Stage 3 Okolo Slovenska, Søren Nissen
2007
Stages 2 & 5 La Tropicale Amissa Bongo, Stefan Heiny
Stage 3 Tour de Taiwan, Christian Knørr
Stage 1 Rhône-Alpes Isère Tour, Hakan Nilsson
Luxembourg Time Trial Championships, Christian Poos
Stage 2 Tour de Korea, Hannes Blank
2008
Stage 4 Jelajah Malaysia, Fredrik Johansson
Stage 4 Ronde de l'Oise, Sébastien Harbonnier
2009
Stage 4 Flèche du Sud, Fredrik Johansson
Tartu GP, Hannes Blank
Grand Prix de la ville de Pérenchies, Robert Retschke
Grand Prix des Marbriers, Robert Retschke
2010
Grand Prix de la ville de Nogent-sur-Oise, Vytautas Kaupas
Prologue (ITT) Flèche du Sud, Jempy Drucker
Stage 4 Flèche du Sud, Stefan Cohnen
Lithuania Road Race Championships, Vytautas Kaupas
Ronde Pévéloise, Frank Dressler
2011
Luxembourg Time Trial Championships, Christian Poos
Stage 4 Sibiu Cycling Tour, Christian Poos
2012
Paris–Mantes-en-Yvelines, Alex Meenhorst
2013
Stage 3 Tour de Singkarak, Johan Coenen
Stage 1 Tour de Guadeloupe, Janis Dakteris
Stage 2a Tour de Guadeloupe, Johan Coenen
Stages 4 & 9 Tour de Guadeloupe, Diego Milán
Stage 5 Tour de Guadeloupe, César Bihel
2014
Stage 2 Vuelta a la Independencia Nacional, Janis Dakteris
Dominican Republic Time Trial Championships, Augusto Sánchez
Dominican Republic Road Race Championships, Diego Milán
Stage 2a Tour de Guadeloupe, Johan Coenen
Stage 5 Tour de Guadeloupe, Diego Milán
Stage 8a Tour de Guadeloupe, Janis Dakteris
Stage 1b Giro del Friuli-Venezia Giulia, Janis Dakteris
2015
Hungary Time Trial Championships, Krisztián Lovassy
Overall Tour de Hongrie, Tom Thill
2017
Hungary Road Race Championships, Krisztián Lovassy
Stage 3a Tour of Szeklerland, Cristian Raileanu

== Team roster ==
Rider	Date of birth
Claudio Catania (ITA)	4 May 1992 (age 34)
Ivan Centrone (LUX)	17 September 1995 (age 30)
Tiago da Silva (LUX)	6 February 1997 (age 29)
Jelle Donders (BEL)	18 June 1993 (age 33)
Raphael Kockelmann (LUX)	10 May 1999 (age 27)
Olivier Pardini (BEL)	30 July 1985 (age 41)
Jan Petelin (LUX)	2 July 1996 (age 30)

Rider	Date of birth
Bálazs Rózsa (HUN)	26 November 1995 (age 30)
Maxim Rusnac (MDA)	29 September 1992 (age 33)
Rick Stemper (LUX)	9 August 1993 (age 33)
Josh Teasdale (GBR)	23 October 1993 (age 32)
Tom Thill (LUX)	31 March 1990 (age 36)
Larry Valvasori (LUX)	30 May 1996 (age 30)
Tom Vermeer (NED)	28 December 1985 (age 40)
Kevin Verwaest (BEL)	6 January 1989 (age 37)
Laurin Winter (GER)	4 September 1996 (age 30)
