= Luxembourgish National Road Race Championships =

National road cycling championship in Luxembourg

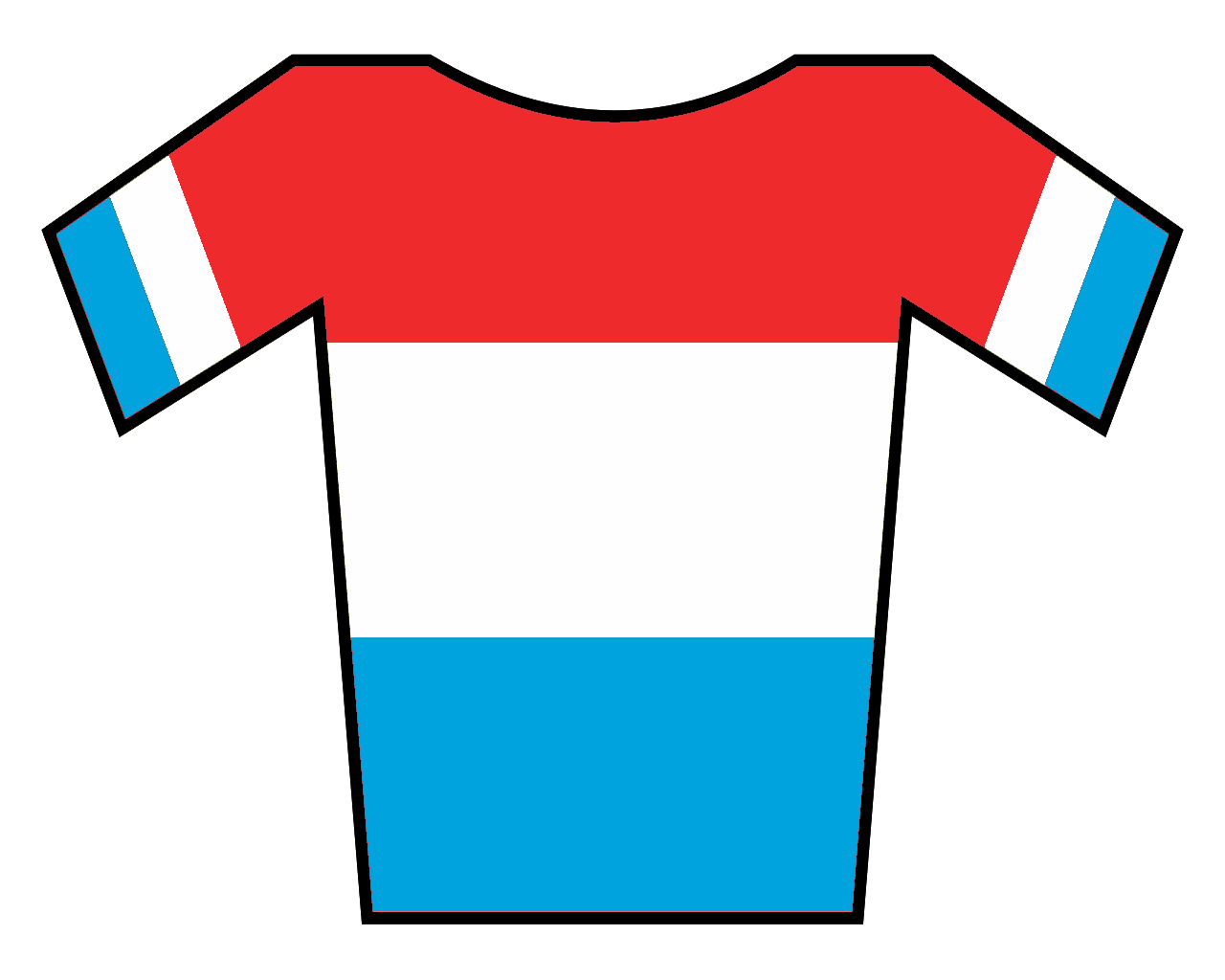

The Luxembourg National Road Race Championship is a cycling race where Luxembourg cyclists decide who will become the champion for the year to come. The event was established in 1922, and a separate Luxembourgish National Time Trial Championships has been held since 1999.

The women's championship was not established until 1959. The most wins were scored by Elsy Jacobs, who won 15 road championships.

The winners of each event are awarded a symbolic cycling jersey which is red, white and blue just like the flag of Luxembourg. These colours can be worn by the rider at other road racing events in the country to show their status as national champion. The champion's stripes can be combined into a sponsored rider's team kit design for this purpose.

== Men ==
Luxembourgish National Road Race Championships – Men's elite race
Race details
- Region: Luxembourg
- Discipline: Road bicycle racing
- Type: One-day

History
- First edition: 1922
- First winner: Franz Heck
- Most wins: Nicolas Frantz (12 wins)
- Most recent: Arthur Kluckers

Year	Gold	Silver	Bronze
1922	Franz Heck	–	-
1923	Nicolas Frantz	Franz Heck	-
1924	Nicolas Frantz	–	-
1925	Nicolas Frantz	–	-
1926	Nicolas Frantz	–	-
1927	Nicolas Frantz	Nicolas Engel	Victor Kirchen
1928	Nicolas Frantz	Victor Kirchen	-
1929	Nicolas Frantz	Victor Kirchen	-
1930	Nicolas Frantz	–	-
1931	Nicolas Frantz	Jean-Pierre Muller	-
1932	Nicolas Frantz	–	-
1933	Nicolas Frantz	–	-
1934	Nicolas Frantz	–	-
1935	Arsène Mersch	–	-
1936 (Note: Edition held in the form of a time trial.)	Émile Bewing	–	-
1937	Pierre Clemens	Jean Majerus	-
1938	Mathias Clemens	Paul Frantz	Jean Majerus
1939	Arsène Mersch	Aloyse Klensch	-
1940	Lucien Bidinger	–	-
1941– 1944	Not held due to World War II		
1945	Joseph Bintener	Mathias Clemens	Jeng Kirchen
1946	Jeng Kirchen	Joseph Bintener	-
1947	Jean Goldschmit	Jeng Kirchen	Mathias Clemens
1948	Mathias Clemens	Jeng Kirchen	Lucien Gillen
1949	Willy Kemp	Bim Diederich	Jeng Kirchen
1950	Jean Goldschmit	Bim Diederich	Marcel Ernzer
1951	Jeng Kirchen	Willy Kemp	Bim Diederich
1952	Johny Goedert	Willy Kemp	Marcel Ernzer
1953	Marcel Ernzer	Bim Diederich	Charly Gaul
1954	Marcel Ernzer	Charly Gaul	Jean-Pierre Schmitz
1955	Marcel Ernzer	Willy Kemp	François Gehlhausen
1956	Charly Gaul	Marcel Ernzer	Jean-Pierre Schmitz
1957	Charly Gaul	Marcel Ernzer	Willy Kemp
1958	Jean-Pierre Schmitz	Charly Gaul	Marcel Ernzer
1959	Charly Gaul	Jean-Pierre Schmitz	Marcel Ernzer
1960	Charly Gaul	Jean-Pierre Schmitz	Aldo Bolzan
1961	Charly Gaul	Marcel Ernzer	Aldo Bolzan
1962	Charly Gaul	Roger Thull	Bruno Martinato
1963	Roger Thull	Lucien Gillen	-
1964	Roger Thull	–	-
1965	Johny Schleck	Roger Thull	-
1966	Edy Schütz	Johny Schleck	-
1967	Edy Schütz	Johny Schleck	-
1968	Edy Schütz	Johny Schleck	Roland Smaniotto
1969	Edy Schütz	Roger Gilson	-
1970	Edy Schütz	–	-
1971	Edy Schütz	–	-
1972	Roger Gilson	–	-
1973	Johny Schleck	Roger Gilson	-
1974 (Note: The race was held alongside the German National Road Race Championships and the Swiss National Road Race Championships.)	Roger Gilson	Erny Kirchen	Jean Becker
1975	Roger Gilson	Jean Becker	-
1976	Roger Gilson	–	-
1977	Lucien Didier	Marcel Thull	Roger Gilson
1978	Lucien Didier	–	-
1979	Lucien Didier	–	-
1980	Lucien Didier	–	-
1981	Eugène Urbany	–	-
1982	Eugène Urbany (Note: Lucien Didier initially finished first, but was disqualified for doping.)	–	-
1983	Eugène Urbany	–	-
1984	Claude Michely	–	-
1985	Claude Michely	–	-
1986	Enzo Mezzapesa	–	-
1987	Enzo Mezzapesa	Claude Michely	-
1988	Enzo Mezzapesa	Claude Michely	-
1989	Pascal Triebel	–	-
1990	Pascal Kohlvelter	–	-
1991– 1995	Not held		
1996	Enzo Mezzapesa	Benny Schaack (Note: Claude Entringer finished second on the road, but was relegated to fourth place, due to irregular sprinting.)	Daniel Bintz
1997	Daniel Bintz	Christian Poos	Enzo Mezzapesa
1998	Tom Flammang	Vincenzo Centrone	~~Pascal Triebel~~ (Note: Pascal Triebel initially finished third, but was disqualified for doping.)
1999	Kim Kirchen	Benoît Joachim	Max Becker
2000	Benoît Joachim	Christian Poos	Fränk Schleck
2001	Christian Poos	Benoît Joachim	Kim Kirchen
2002	Christian Poos	Vincenzo Centrone	Steve Fogen
2003	Benoît Joachim	Marc Vanacker	Christian Poos
2004	Kim Kirchen	Fränk Schleck	Benoît Joachim
2005	Fränk Schleck	Kim Kirchen	Andy Schleck
2006	Kim Kirchen	Fränk Schleck	Andy Schleck
2007	Benoît Joachim	Christian Poos	Fränk Schleck
2008	Fränk Schleck	Benoît Joachim	Christian Poos
2009	Andy Schleck	Laurent Didier	Fränk Schleck
2010	Fränk Schleck	Andy Schleck	Ben Gastauer
2011	Fränk Schleck	Andy Schleck	Laurent Didier
2012	Laurent Didier	Ben Gastauer	Fränk Schleck
2013	Bob Jungels	Pit Schlechter	Jempy Drucker
2014	Fränk Schleck	Ben Gastauer	Andy Schleck
2015	Bob Jungels	Ben Gastauer	Pit Schlechter
2016	Bob Jungels	Alex Kirsch	Fränk Schleck
2017	Bob Jungels	Alex Kirsch	Ben Gastauer
2018	Bob Jungels	Alex Kirsch	Tim Diederich
2019	Bob Jungels	Kevin Geniets	Pit Leyder
2020	Kevin Geniets	Bob Jungels	Jempy Drucker
2021	Kevin Geniets	Jempy Drucker	Loïc Bettendorff
2022	Colin Heiderscheid	Noé Ury	Alexandre Kess
2023	Alex Kirsch	Michel Ries	Mats Wenzel
2024	Kevin Geniets	Mats Wenzel	Alexandre Kess
2025	Arthur Kluckers	Luc Wirtgen	Alexandre Kess
2026	Arthur Kluckers	Mathieu Kockelmann	Mats Wenzel

== Women ==
Luxembourgish National Road Race Championships – Women's elite race
Race details
- Region: Luxembourg
- Discipline: Road bicycle racing
- Type: One-day

History
- First edition: 1959
- First winner: Elsy Jacobs
- Most wins: Elsy Jacobs (15 wins)
- Most recent: Christine Majerus

Year	Location	Gold	Silver	Bronze
1959		Elsy Jacobs	Cilly Debras	-
1960		Elsy Jacobs	Fernande Ludwig	Irène Gilson
1961		Elsy Jacobs	Fernande Ludwig	Gisèle Jacob
1962		Elsy Jacobs	Marceline Reinert	Gisèle Jacob
1963		Elsy Jacobs	Gisèle Jacob	Fernande Ludwig
1964		Elsy Jacobs	–	-
1965		Elsy Jacobs	Monique Morth	-
1966		Elsy Jacobs	Mady Morth	Monique Morth
1967		Elsy Jacobs	Mady Morth	-
1968		Elsy Jacobs	–	-
1969		Sylvie Welter	Marianne Molitor	-
1970		Elsy Jacobs	Sylvie Welter	Irène Engelmann
1971		Elsy Jacobs	Irène Engelmann	-
1972		Elsy Jacobs	Irène Engelmann	Monique Morth
1973		Elsy Jacobs	Irène Engelmann	-
1974		Elsy Jacobs	–	-
1975				
1976				
1977				
1978				
1979				
1980				
1981				
1982				
1983		Simone Steffen	Thessy Reding	Pascale Meysembourg
1984		Tessi Wolter	Simone Steffen	Patricia Neuens
1985		Simone Steffen	Denise Landa	Patricia Neuens
1986		Simone Steffen	Danielle Linden	Danielle Konter
1987		Danielle Linden	Sandra Gatti	Romaine Marbach
1988		Tanja Reuland	Danielle Linden	Romaine Marbach
1989		Tanja Reuland	Danielle Linden	Romaine Marbach
1990		Tanja Reuland	Joëlle Witry	Tania Bettel
1991		Tanja Reuland	Denise Landa	Tania Bettel
1992		Tania Bettel	Pierrette Klein	Denise Landa
1993		Denise Landa	Tania Bettel	Eileen Ronk
1994		Myriam Keller	Suzie Godart	Denise Landa
1995		Myriam Keller	Suzie Godart	Nathalie Halle
1996		Myriam Keller	Nora Oliboni	Tessi Wolter
1997		Myriam Keller	Suzie Godart	Nora Oliboni
1998		Suzie Godart	Tanja Wintersdorf	Nathalie Jolink
1999		Tanja Wintersdorf	Nathalie Jolink	Laurence Kipgen
2000		Tanja Wintersdorf	Suzie Godart	Lea Schmitt
2001		Suzie Godart	Danielle Lentz	Isabelle Hoffmann
2002		Danielle Lentz	Isabelle Hoffmann	Tanja Wintersdorf
2003		Isabelle Hoffmann	Christine Kovelter	Danielle Lentz
2004	Luxembourg	Isabelle Hoffmann	Suzie Godart	Betty Kinn
2005	Luxembourg	Nathalie Lamborelle	Isabelle Hoffmann	Betty Kinn
2006	Erpeldange	Isabelle Hoffmann	Anne-Marie Schmitt	Nathalie Lamborelle
2007	Luxembourg	Suzie Godart	Anne-Marie Schmitt	Christine Majerus
2008		Nathalie Lamborelle	Christine Majerus	Suzie Godart
2009	Differdange	Nathalie Lamborelle	Christine Majerus	Anne-Marie Schmitt
2010	Hesperange	Christine Majerus	Nathalie Lamborelle	Suzie Godart
2011	Diekirch	Christine Majerus	Nathalie Lamborelle	Anne-Marie Schmitt
2012	Tétange	Christine Majerus	Nathalie Lamborelle	Anne-Marie Schmitt
2013	Dippach	Christine Majerus	Nathalie Lamborelle	Chantal Hoffmann
2014	Mamer	Christine Majerus	Chantal Hoffmann	Carmen Coljon
2015	Wiltz	Christine Majerus	Elise Maes	Chantal Hoffmann
2016	Berbourg	Christine Majerus	Chantal Hoffmann	Nathalie Lamborelle
2017	Remerschen	Christine Majerus	Elise Maes	Anne-Sophie Harsch
2018	Redange	Christine Majerus	Elise Maes	Anne-Sophie Harsch
2019	Sanem	Christine Majerus	Chantal Hoffmann	Laurence Thill
2020	Mamer	Christine Majerus	Pia Wiltgen	Mia Berg
2021		Christine Majerus	Sophie Margue	Mia Berg
2022	Nospelt	Christine Majerus	Isabella Klein	
2023		Christine Majerus	Nina Berton	Marie Schreiber
