= Thull =

Thull is a surname. Notable people with the surname include:

- Hans Rudolf Thull (born 1945), German artist
- Ketty Thull (1905–1987), Luxembourg cook, educator and cookbook writer
- Marcel Thull (born 1951), Luxembourgish cyclist who competed at the 1976 Summer Olympics
- Roger Thull (born 1939), Luxembourgish cyclist who competed at the 1960 Summer Olympics

== See also ==
- Thul, a town of Jacobabad District, Sindh Province, Pakistan
