= Kirchen =

Kirchen may refer to:

== Places ==
- Kirchen (Sieg), a town and spa in Rhineland-Palatinate, Germany
- Verbandsgemeinde Kirchen (Sieg), a collective municipality in Rhineland-Palatinate, Germany

== People ==
- Alf Kirchen (1913-1999), English footballer
- Bill Kirchen (born 1948), American guitarist, singer and songwriter
- Erny Kirchen (born 1949), Luxembourgish cyclist, nephew of Jeng and father of Kim
- Jeng Kirchen (1919-2010), Luxembourgish cyclist, uncle of Erny
- Jim Kirchen (1932-1997), Luxembourgish cyclist
- Kim Kirchen (born 1978), Luxembourgish cyclist, son of Erny
- Victor Kirchen (1898-1970), Luxembourgish cyclist

== See also ==
- Efringen-Kirchen, a municipality in Baden-Württemberg, Germany
- Josy Kirchens (born 1943), Luxembourgish football player and manager
