= Kayl =

Kayl Keel (Luxembourgish)
- Commune
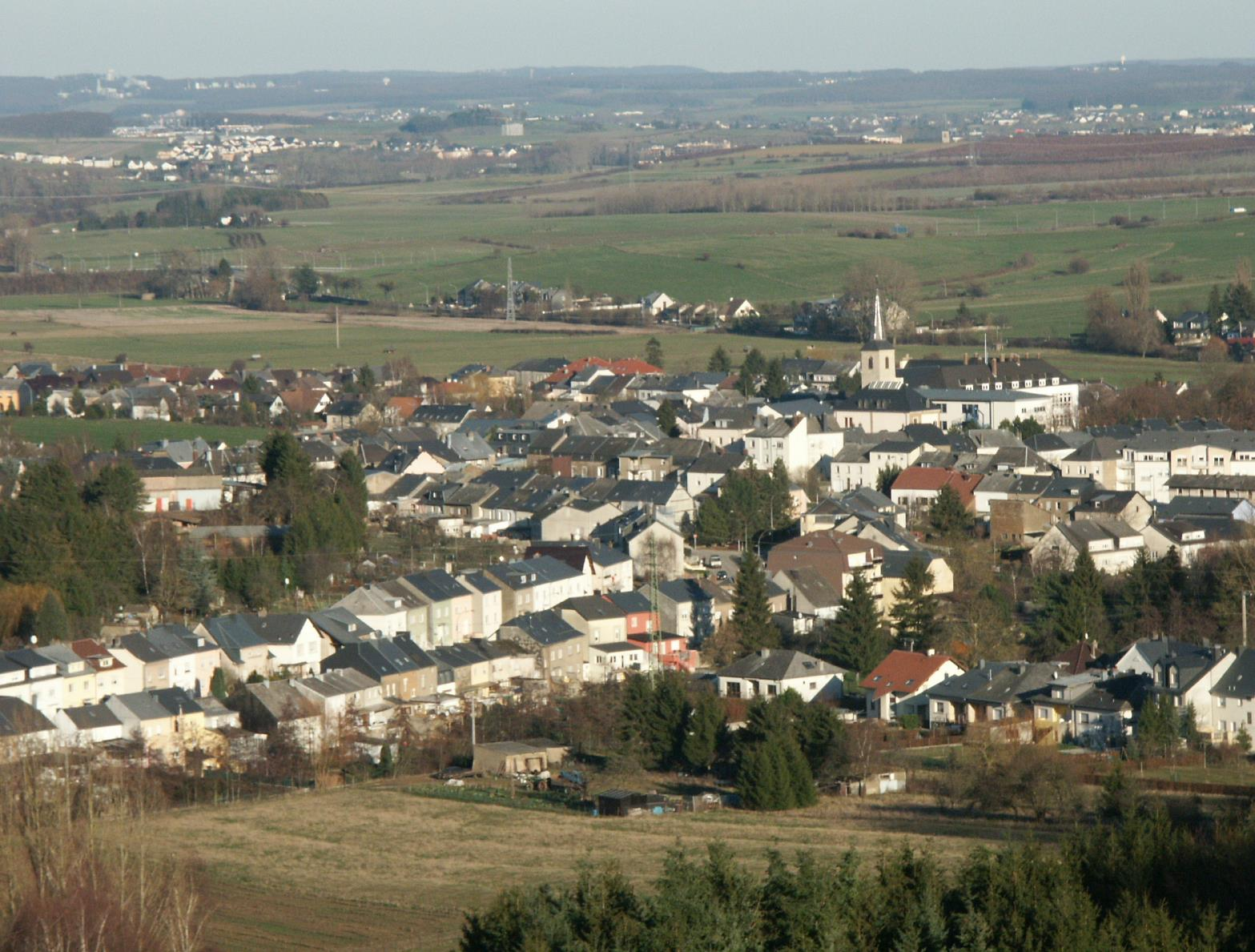

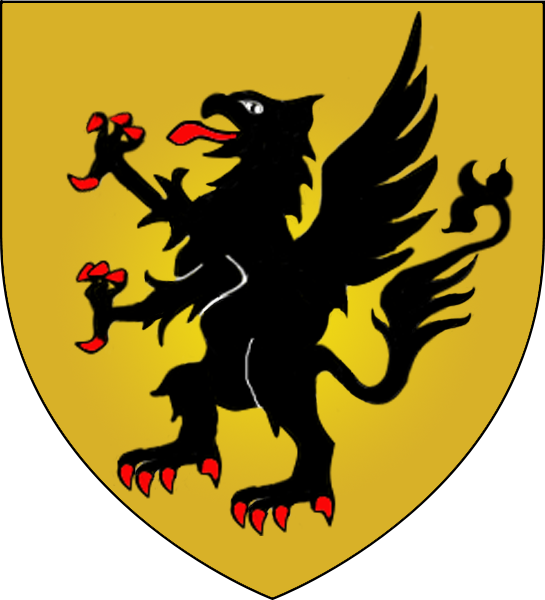
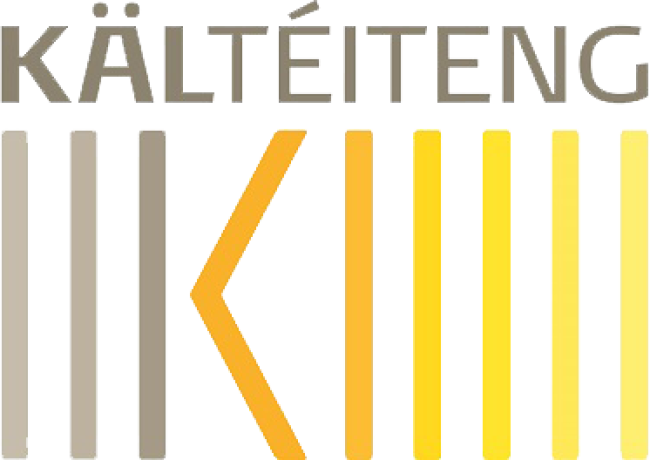
- Coat of arms Brandmark

- Map of Luxembourg with Kayl highlighted in orange, and the canton in dark red
- Coordinates: 49.4861°N 6.0389°E
- Country: Luxembourg
- Canton: Esch-sur-Alzette

Government
  - Mayor: Jean Weiler (CSV)

Area
  - Total: 14.86 km^{2} (5.74 sq mi)
  - Rank: 78th of 100
- Highest elevation: 425 m (1,394 ft)
  - Rank: 33rd of 100
- Lowest elevation: 274 m (899 ft)
  - Rank: 75th of 100

Population (2025)
  - Total: 9,969
  - Rank: 15th of 100
  - Density: 670.9/km^{2} (1,738/sq mi)
  - Rank: 13th of 100
- Time zone: UTC+1 (CET)
  - Summer (DST): UTC+2 (CEST)
- LAU 2: LU0000206
- Website: kayl.lu

Kayl (German pronunciation: [ˈkaɪl]; Luxembourgish: Keel [ˈkeːl] or locally Käl [ˈkɛːl]) is a commune and town in south-western Luxembourg. It is part of the canton of Esch-sur-Alzette.

As of September 2026, the town of Kayl, which lies in the centre of the commune, has a population of 6,014. Other towns within the commune include Tétange.

The first surviving written reference to 'Keyle' dates from 1235. Since the thirteenth century the name of the town has not changed significantly, although more than twenty different spellings have been identified.

The town is the location of the Montenegro honorary consulate in Luxembourg.

== Population ==
Historical population

Year	Pop.	±%
1821	724	—
1851	1,115	+54.0%
1900	4,069	+264.9%
1910	4,555	+11.9%
1922	4,224	−7.3%
1935	5,415	+28.2%

Year	Pop.	±%
1947	5,471	+1.0%
1960	6,505	+18.9%
1970	6,691	+2.9%
1981	6,354	−5.0%
1990	6,346	−0.1%
2000	7,011	+10.5%

Year	Pop.	±%
2005	7,344	+4.7%
2010	7,821	+6.5%
2015	8,121	+3.8%
2020	9,506	+17.1%
2021	9,668	+1.7%

Source data

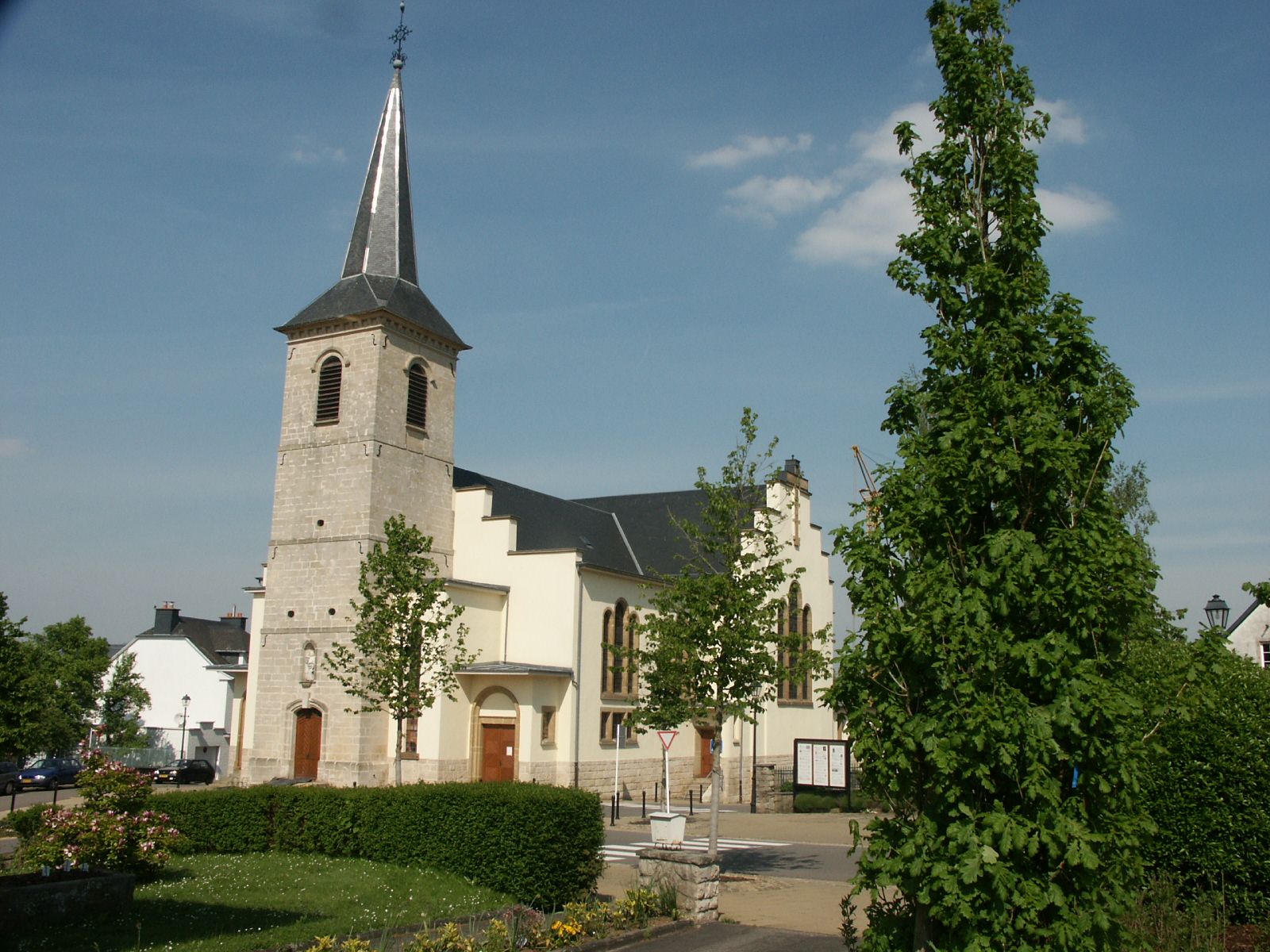
Kayl church

== Notable people ==
- Jean-Pierre Nuel (1847 in Tétange – 1920), a Luxembourgish-Belgian ophthalmologist and physiologist.
- Camillo Felgen (1920 in Tétange – 2005), a Luxembourgish singer, lyricist, disc jockey and TV presenter
- Edy Schütz (born 1941 in Tétange), a Luxembourgish professional road bicycle racer; stage-winner in the 1966 Tour de France.
