= 0711 Cycling =

German cycling team

0711 / Cycling
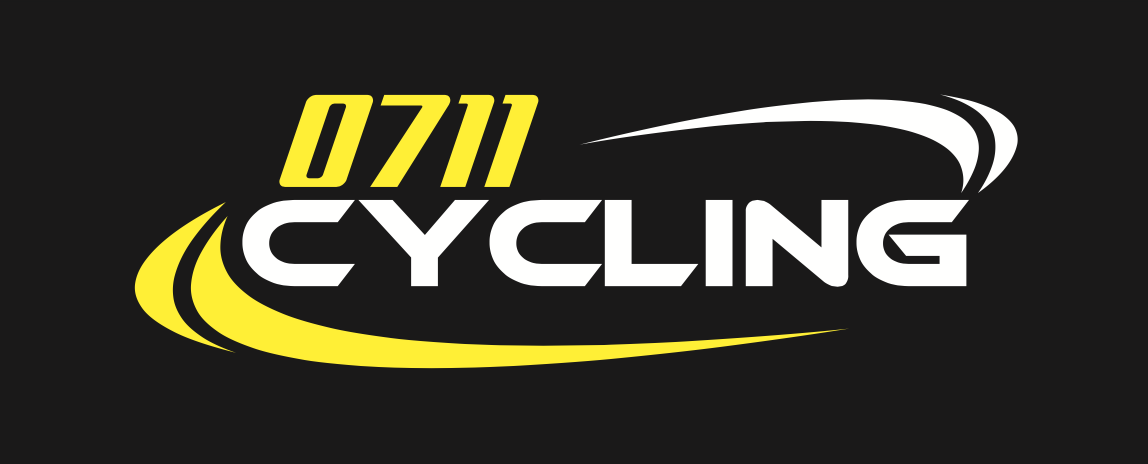

Team information
- Registered: Germany
- Founded: 2013
- Disbanded: 2018
- Discipline: Road
- Status: National (2013); UCI Continental (2014–2017); National (2018)

Team name history
- 2013–2015 2016 2017–2018: Team Stuttgart; Christina Jewelry Pro Cycling; 0711 / Cycling

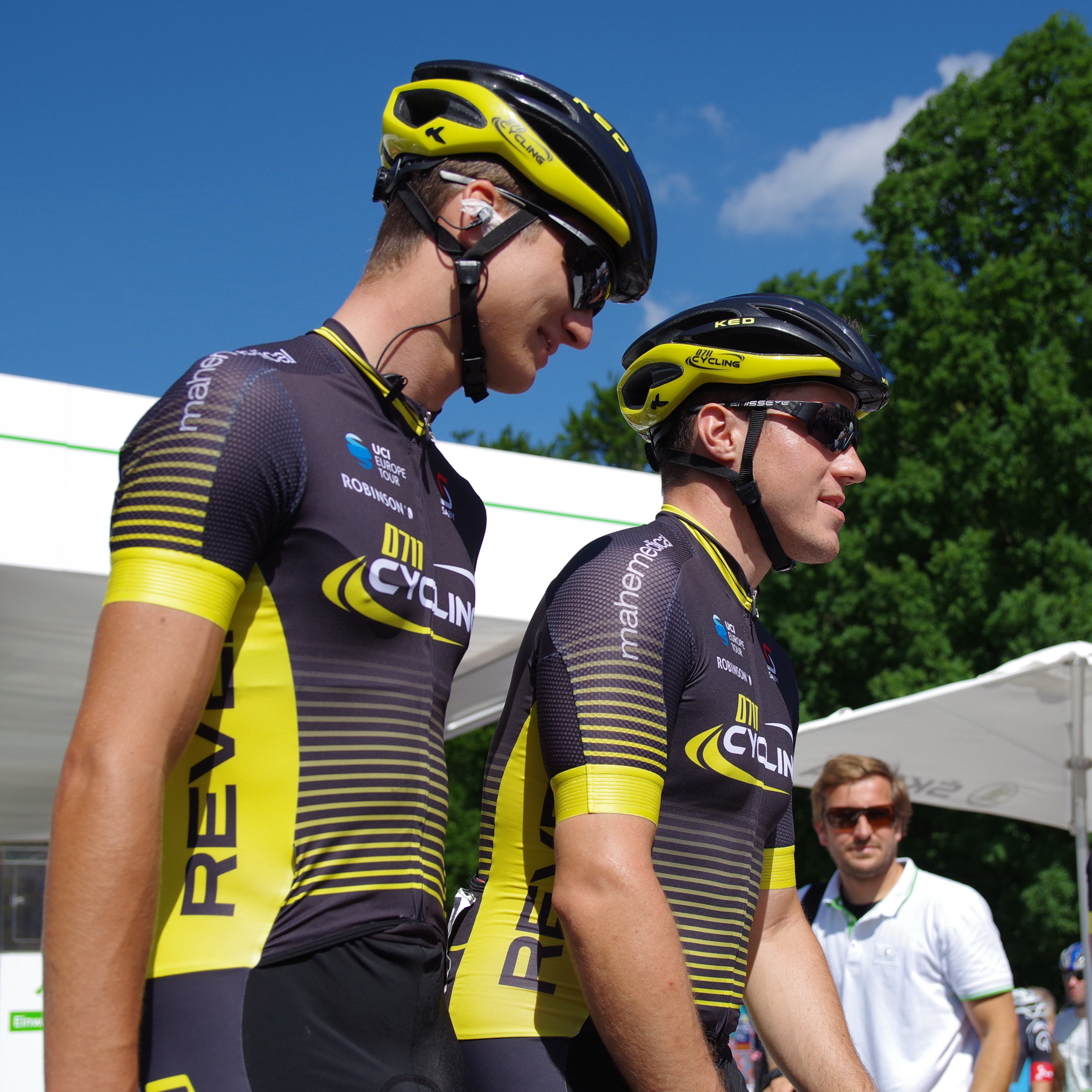

0711 / Cycling was a national team founded in 2013 and based in Germany. It participated in UCI Continental Circuits races. In January 2016, it was announced that the team had agreed a one-year sponsorship deal with Christina Jewelry & Watches, who had previously owned the Christina Watches–Dana squad. In 2017, the team changed names to reflect the area code where the team's headquarters are. 2017 was the final year at UCI Continental level for the team. The team raced one year at Amateur level before disbanding.

== Final team roster ==
| Rider | Date of birth |
|---|---|
| Jonas Engel (GER) | 24 August 1994 (aged 24) |
| Henrik Hamm (GER) | 25 October 1997 (aged 21) |
| Dan Erik Hansen (NOR) | 8 August 1988 (aged 30) |
| Jan Hugger (GER) | 10 July 1998 (aged 20) |
| Alexander Kurrle (GER) | unknown |

| Rider | Date of birth |
|---|---|
| Marvin Kötting (GER) | 6 January 1995 (aged 23) |
| Simon Laib (GER) | 12 December 1995 (aged 23) |
| Luboš Pelánek (CZE) | 21 July 1998 (aged 20) |
| Andrej Petrovski (MKD) | 18 April 1996 (aged 22) |
| Jan Schmöller (GER) | unknown |

== Major wins ==
2014
Stage 6 Tour of China I, Tino Thömel
2016
Namibia National Time Trial championships, Till Drobisch
Overall Tour du Maroc, Stefan Schumacher
2017
Namibia National Time Trial championships, Till Drobisch
2018
Overall Trofej Kuči, Andrej Petrovski

Stages 1 & 2, Andrej Petrovski

North Macedonia National Road race Championships, Andrej Petrovski
North Macedonia National Time trial Championships, Andrej Petrovski

== National champions ==
2016
Time Trial, Till Drobisch
2017
Time Trial, Till Drobisch
2018
Road race, Andrej Petrovski
Time trial, Andrej Petrovski
