= Antri Christoforou =

Cypriot cyclist (born 1992)

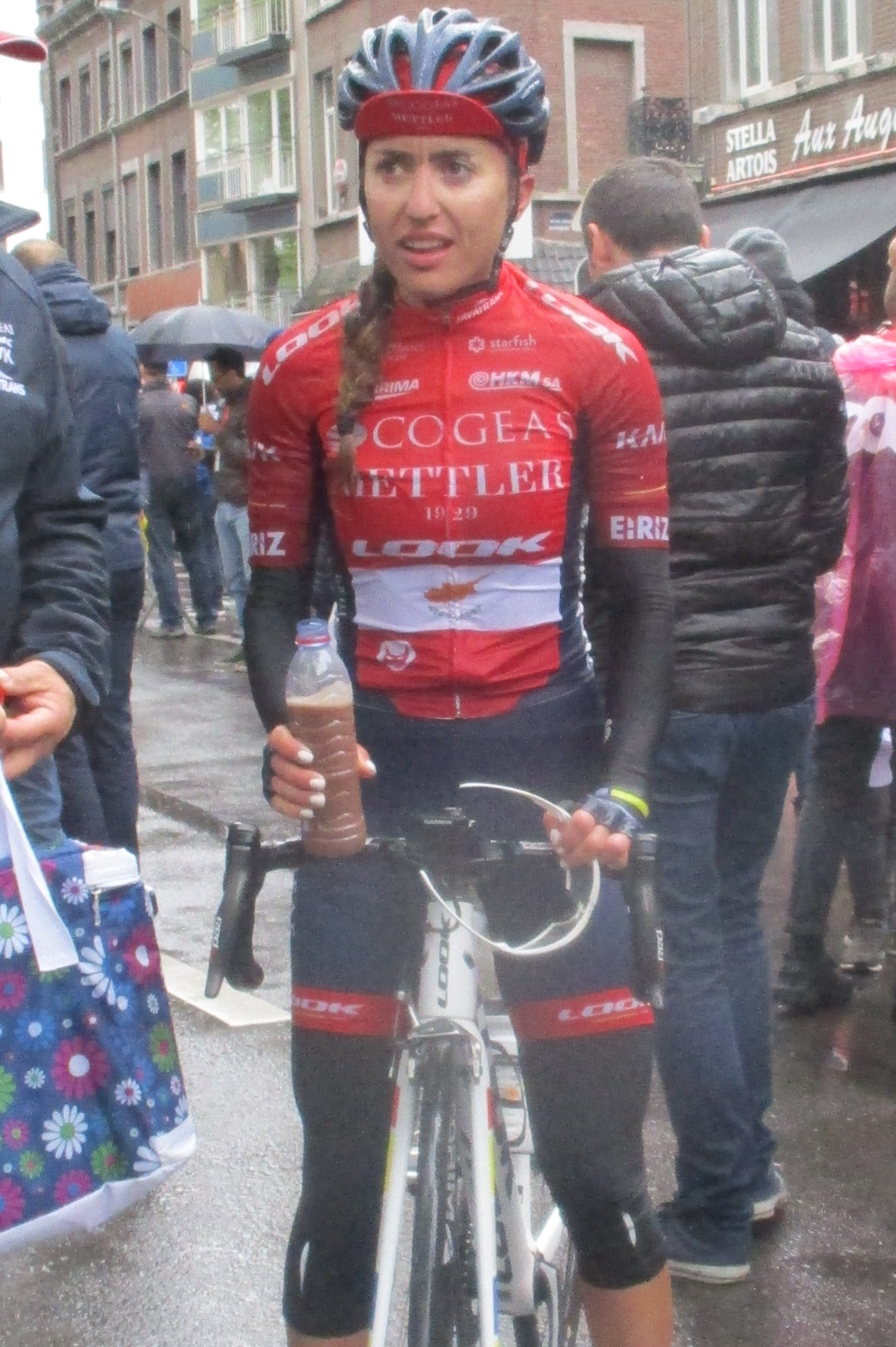
- Christoforou in 2019

Personal information
- Full name: Andria Christoforou
- Born: 2 April 1992 (age 34) Strovolos, Cyprus
- Height: 1.66 m (5 ft 5 in)
- Weight: 53 kg (117 lb)

Cycling career
- Sport: Cycling
- Current team: Roland Le Dévoluy
- Disciplines: Road; Mountain biking
- Role: Rider

Amateur teams
- 2016: Jos Feron Lady Force
- 2016: Maaslandster Nicheliving

Professional teams
- 2016–2017: Servetto Footon
- 2018–2019: Cogeas
- 2020: Doltcini–Van Eyck Sport
- 2021: Burgos Alimenta Women Cycling Sport
- 2022: Team Farto–BTC
- 2022–2023: Human Powered Health
- 2024–: Roland

Major wins
- One-day races and Classics National Road Race Championships (2010, 2013, 2016–2023) National Time Trial Championships (2013, 2016, 2018–2023)
Medal record
Representing Cyprus
Women's road cycling
Mediterranean Games
Bronze medal – third place	2018 Tarragona	Time trial
Games of the Small States of Europe
Gold medal – first place	2017 San Marino	Time trial
Bronze medal – third place	2013 Luxembourg	Time trial
Women's mountain bike racing
Games of the Small States of Europe
Silver medal – second place	2017 San Marino	Cross-country
Bronze medal – third place	2011 Liechtenstein	Cross-country

Andria "Antri" Christoforou (born 2 April 1992) is a Cypriot professional racing cyclist, who currently rides for UCI Women's WorldTeam Roland Le Dévoluy. She has been the National Champion for Cyprus in the road race ten tines and in the individual time trial eight times. She was selected to represent Cyprus at the 2016 Summer Olympics. She qualified to represent Cyprus at the 2020 Summer Olympics in the women's road race.

== Major results ==
2010
1st Road race, National Road Championships
2013
National Road Championships

1st Road race
1st Time trial

3rd Time Trial, Games of the Small States of Europe
2014
1st Sfendami Mountainbike race
2nd Lakatamia Mountainbike race
2016
National Road Championships

1st Road race
1st Time trial

1st Arad Dimona Arad
1st Dead Sea–Scorpion Pass
3rd Massada Arad
2017
1st Road race, National Road Championships
Games of the Small States of Europe

1st Time trial
2nd Cross-country
5th Road race

2018
National Road Championships

1st Road race
1st Time trial

1st VR Women ITT
3rd Time trial, Mediterranean Games
6th Overall Tour of Eftalia Hotels & Velo Alanya
6th Time Trial, Commonwealth Games
10th Chrono Champenois – Trophée Européen
2019
National Road Championships

1st Road race
1st Time trial

1st Scorpions' Pass Time Trial
2nd Aphrodite's Sanctuary Cycling Race
2nd Aphrodite Cycling Race Individual Time Trial
3rd Tour of Arava
5th Grand Prix Justiniano Hotels
7th Grand Prix Velo Alanya
7th Chrono Gatineau
8th Grand Prix Cycliste de Gatineau
2020
National Road Championships

1st Road race
1st Time trial

2021
National Road Championships

1st Road race
1st Time trial

2022
National Road Championships

1st Road race
1st Time trial

1st La Classique Morbihan
Mediterranean Games

4th Time trial
4th Road race

6th Overall Vuelta Ciclista Andalucia Ruta Del Sol
8th Clasica Femenina Navarra
9th Road race, Commonwealth Games
2023
National Road Championships

1st Road race
1st Time trial

1st Aphrodite Cycling Race Individual Time Trial
1st Aphrodite Cycling Race – Women for future
1st GP of the Mayor of the city Žiar nad Hronom
2nd Aphrodite Cycling Race – RR
3rd Regiónom Nitrianskeho Kraja
4th Poreč Trophy Ladies
6th Respect Ladies Race Slovakia
8th Chrono Féminin de la Gatineau
2024
3rd Overall Vuelta a El Salvador
7th Grand Prix MOPT
9th Grand Prix Presidente
