= Harsch =

Harsch is a surname. Notable people with the surname include:

- Anne-Sophie Harsch (born 1999), Luxembourgish racing cyclist
- Eddie Harsch (1957–2016), Canadian keyboardist
- Joseph C. Harsch (1905–1998), American newspaper, radio, and television journalist
- Klaudius Harsch (born 2001), German curler
