= 2014 UCI Cyclo-cross World Championships – Men's junior race =

Men's Junior Cyclo-cross Race
2014 UCI Cyclo-cross World Championships
- Rainbow jersey

Race details
- Dates: 1 February 2014
- Stages: 1
- Distance: 17 km (11 mi)
- Winning time: 45' 55"

Medalists
	Gold	Thijs Aerts (Belgium)
	Silver	Yannick Peeters (Belgium)
	Bronze	Jelle Schuermans (Belgium)

This event was held on 1 February 2014 as a part of the 2014 UCI Cyclo-cross World Championships. Contenders had to be male and born in 1996 or 1997. It was won by Thijs Aerts of Belgium.

== Race report ==
A long night of raining turned the track to mud and slipperiness. This was evident right at the start where about half of the pack immediately took a tumble seconds after starting. After one lap a group of ten had created a gap, among them pre-race favourites Adam Toupalik (Czech Republic) and European Champion Yannick Peeters (Belgium). By the end of the second lap that group had splintered with Joris Nieuwenhuis (Netherlands and Kobe Goossens (Belgium) forming a lead group. Peeters followed on seven seconds while Toupalik had dropped further back to 24 seconds.

At the end of the third lap things had changed yet again. With two laps left a group of three Belgians (Goossens, Peeters and Schuermans) was in the lead, Nieuwenhuis falling a few seconds behind. In the fourth lap Schuermans fell after a downhill section, taking Goossens down with him. This gave Peeters a small lead on everyone without particularly trying. This gap was quickly bridged by another Belgian, Aerts, creating a group of two Belgians with just over one lap to go. Nieuwenhuis followed closely behind and reached the two just at the start of the last lap.

Aerts managed to escape Peeters and Nieuwenhuis showing how much power he still had left. Peeters played the team game well, not trying to bridge the gap with Nieuwenhuis in his wheel. Nieuwenhuis then slipped slightly, giving Peeters the chance to break away as well as Schuermans managing to come back to Nieuwenhuis.

The gaps remained: Aerts took the gold medal, Peeters silver and Schuermans managed to beat Nieuwenhuis in the sprint. Goossens completed the Belgian party by taking the fifth spot.

== Results ==
Rank	Cyclist	Time
Gold medal	Thijs Aerts (BEL)	45'55"
Silver medal	Yannick Peeters (BEL)	+ 10"
Bronze medal	Jelle Schuermans (BEL)	+ 12"
4	Joris Nieuwenhuis (NED)	+ 12"
5	Kobe Goossens (BEL)	+ 22"
6	Johan Jacobs (SUI)	+ 35"
7	Eli Iserbyt (BEL)	+ 43"
8	Yan Gras (FRA)	+ 58"
9	Sieben Wouters (NED)	+ 1' 10"
10	Hugo Pigeon (FRA)	+ 1' 19"
11	Manuel Todaro (ITA)	+ 1' 38"
12	Thomas Joseph (BEL)	+ 1' 45"
13	Kelvin Bakx (NED)	+ 1' 51"
14	Pascal Eenkhoorn (NED)	+ 2' 22"
15	Sébastien Havot (FRA)	+ 2' 28"
16	Simon Andreassen (DEN)	+ 2' 43"
17	Diego Pablo Sevilla (ESP)	+ 2' 54"
18	Thomas Craig (GBR)	+ 2' 54"
19	Moreno Pellizzon (ITA)	+ 3' 00"
20	Timon Rüegg (SUI)	+ 3' 15"
21	Juraj Bellan (SVK)	+ 3' 25"
22	Kamil Malecki (POL)	+ 3' 35"
23	Kevin Geniets (LUX)	+ 3' 36"
24	Lucas Dubau (FRA)	+ 3' 37"
25	Florian Vidal (FRA)	+ 3' 52"
26	Maxx Chance (USA)	+ 3' 58"
27	Giulio Franzolin (ITA)	+ 3' 59"
28	Willem Boersma (CAN)	+ 3' 59"
29	Cooper Willsey (USA)	+ 4' 06"
30	Austin Vincent (USA)	+ 4' 10"
31	Gotzon Martin (ESP)	+ 4' 14"
32	Andrej Petrovski (MKD)	+ 4' 15"
33	Raul Fernandez (ESP)	+ 4' 16"
34	Tadaaki Nakai (JPN)	+ 4' 17"
35	Ludwig Cords (GER)	+ 4' 29"
36	Raphael Schröder (GER)	+ 4' 33"
37	Matej Ulik (SVK)	+ 4' 43"
38	Lukas Kunt (CZE)	+ 4' 58"
39	Jack Ravenscroft (GBR)	+ 5' 59"
40	Sean Dunlea (GBR)	+ 6' 16"
41	Martin Metejcek (CZE)	+ 6' 25"
42	Peter Goguen (USA)	+ 6' 34"
43	Mason Burtnik (CAN)	+ 6' 37"
44	Steven Schreiber (GER)	+ 6' 45"
45	Adrian Sirek (CZE)	+ 7' 03"
46	Lauritz Urnauer (GER)	+ 7' 29"
47	Paul Lindenau (GER)	+ 8' 20"
48	Ryo Takeuchi (JPN)	+ 8' 31"
49	Sean Germaine (CAN)	+ 9' 01"
50	Nicholas Smith (AUS)	1 LAP
51	Dusan Rajovic (SRB)	2 LAPS
