= Cypriot National Road Championships =

National road cycling championships in Cyprus

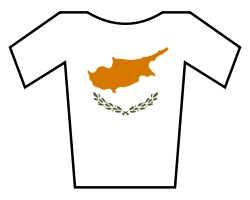

Race details
- Date: May/June
- Discipline: Road
- Type: One-day race

The Cypriot National Road Championships are road cycling championships, held annually, to decide the Cypriot champions in both the road race and time trial disciplines.

== Men ==
Year	Road Race	Time Trial
2001	Alexis Charalambous	Alexis Charalambous
2002	Nikos Dimitriou	Theodoros Kotopoulis
Championships not held between 2003 and 2006.
2007	Christos Kythraiotis	Christos Kythraiotis
2008	Demetris Araouzos	Andreas Nikolaou
2009	Vassilis Adamou	Vassilis Adamou
2010	Vassilis Adamou	
2011	Marios Athanasiades	Vassilis Adamou
2012	Vassilis Adamou	Marios Athanasiades
2013	Marios Athanasiades	Marios Athanasiades
2014	Armanto Archimandritis	Michael Christodoulos
2015	Michael Christodoulos	Andreas Miltiadis
2016	Armanto Archimandritis	Andreas Miltiadis
2017	Alexandros Agrotis	Andreas Miltiadis
2018	Alexandros Matsangos	Andreas Miltiadis
2019	Andreas Miltiadis	Andreas Miltiadis
2020	Andreas Miltiadis	Andreas Miltiadis
2021	Andreas Miltiadis	Andreas Miltiadis
2022	Andreas Miltiadis	Andreas Miltiadis
2023	Alexandros Matsangos	Andreas Miltiadis
2024	Andreas Miltiadis	Andreas Miltiadis

== Women ==
Year	Road Race	Time Trial
2007	Demetra Antoniou	Marina Theodorou
Championships not held in 2008 and 2009.
2010	Antri Christoforou	
Championships not held in 2011 and 2012.
2013	Antri Christoforou	Antri Christoforou
Championships not held in 2014.
2015	Karmen Macheriotou	Karmen Macheriotou
2016	Antri Christoforou	Antri Christoforou
2017	Antri Christoforou	Marina Theodorou
2018	Antri Christoforou	Antri Christoforou
2019	Antri Christoforou	Antri Christoforou
2020	Antri Christoforou	Antri Christoforou
2021	Antri Christoforou	Antri Christoforou
2022	Antri Christoforou	Antri Christoforou
2023	Antri Christoforou	Antri Christoforou
2024	Antri Christoforou	Antri Christoforou

== See also ==
- National Road Race Championships
