= Enzo Mezzapesa =

Luxembourgish road cyclist (b. 1962)

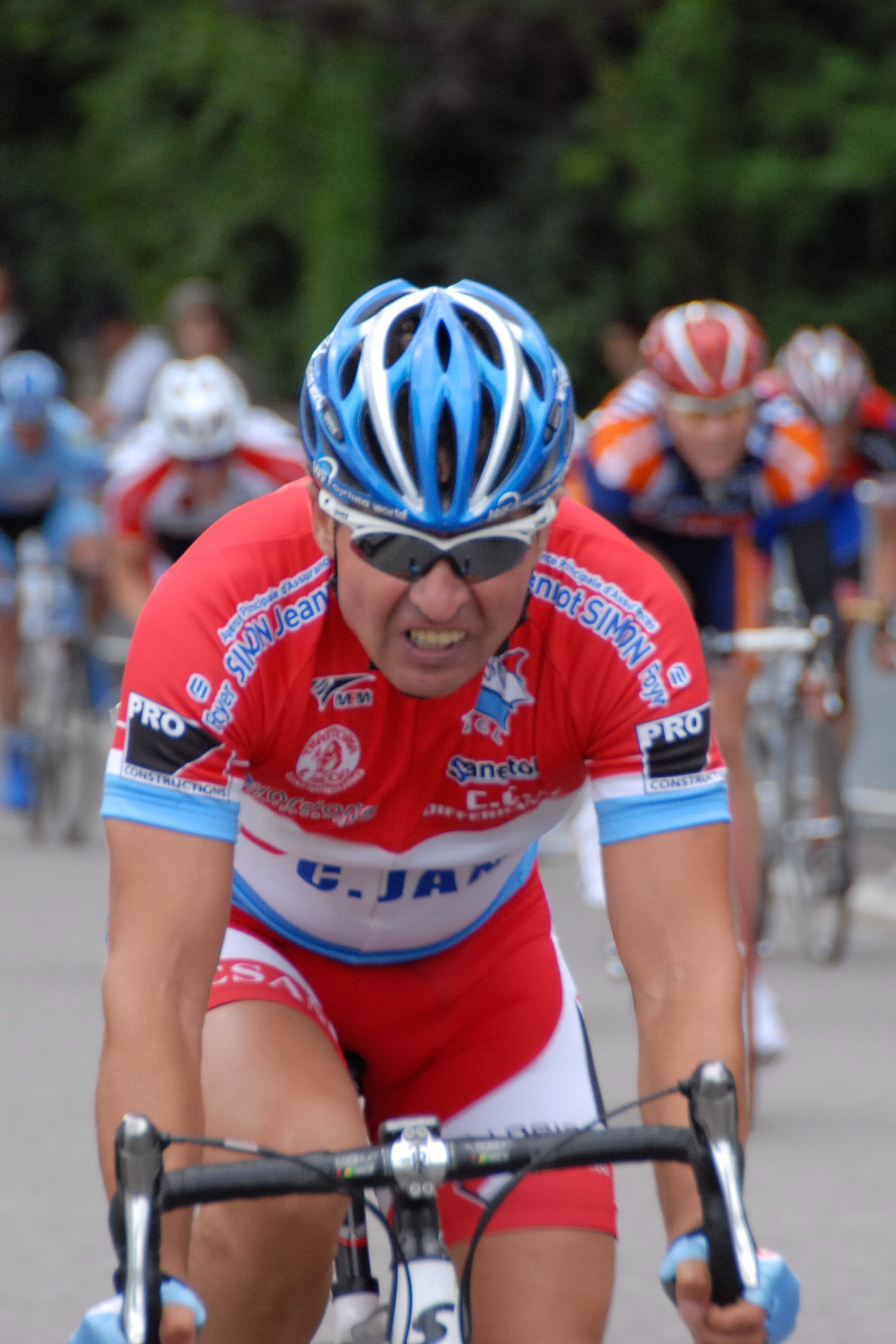
- Mezzapesa in 2007

Personal information
- Born: 18 May 1962 (age 64) Differdange, Luxembourg

Cycling career
- Sport: Cycling
- Current team: Retired
- Discipline: Road
- Role: Rider

Professional teams
- 1986: Ehlinger
- 1987: Blacky–Machnow
- 1988: Ginasio de Tavira

Enzo Mezzapesa (born 18 May 1962 in Differdange) is a Luxembourgish former road cyclist. He was professional from 1986 to 1988.

== Major results ==
1986
1st Road race, National Road Championships
1st Grand Prix des Artisans de Manternach
1987
1st Road race, National Road Championships
1988
1st Road race, National Road Championships
1996
1st Road race, National Road Championships
1997
3rd Road race, National Road Championships
