= Franz Heck =

Personal information
- Born: 6 February 1899 Gilsdorf, Luxembourg
- Died: 8 January 1977 (aged 77) Cannes, France

Cycling career
- Sport: Cycling
- Discipline: Road
- Role: Rider

Franz Heck (6 February 1899 in Gilsdorf – 8 January 1977 in Cannes) was a Luxembourgish racing cyclist. He won the Luxembourgish National Road Race Championships in 1922.
