= Cycling at the 2017 Games of the Small States of Europe =

- Venue: San Marino
- Dates: 30 May –3 June
- Competitors: 87 from 9 nations

Two disciplines of cycling will be contested at the 2017 Games of the Small States of Europe; road cycling and mountain biking. A total of eight medal events will be held.

== Medal table ==
* Host nation (San Marino)

Rank	Nation	Gold	Silver	Bronze	Total
1	Luxembourg (LUX)	5	1	2	8
2	Cyprus (CYP)	2	3	0	5
3	San Marino (SMR)*	2	1	0	3
4	Andorra (AND)	0	1	2	3
5	Iceland (ISL)	0	1	1	2
5	Malta (MLT)	0	1	1	2
5	Monaco (MON)	0	1	1	2
Totals (7 entries)		9	9	7	25

== Medal summary ==
=== Road cycling ===
Event	Gold		Silver		Bronze	
Men's road race	Pit Leyder (LUX)	2h 22' 33"	Federico Olei (SMR)	s.t.	Andrej Petrovski (MON)	+ 1"
Women's road race	Elise Maes (LUX)	2h 17' 23"	Erla Sigurlaug Sigurdardottir (ISL)	+ 4' 10"	Edie Rees (LUX)	+ 4' 10"
Men's road race team	San Marino; Michael Antonelli; Federico Gasperoni; Luigi Giulietti; Federico Olei	7h 7' 46"	Andorra; David Albós; Oscar Cabanas; Albert Gomez; Julio Pintado	+ 3"	Malta; Etienne Bonello; Maurice Formosa; James Mifsud; Alexander Pettett	+ 4"
Women's road race team	Luxembourg; Anne-Sophie Harsch; Chantal Hoffmann; Elise Maes; Edie Rees	7h 0' 30"	Malta; Stephanie Alden; Marie Claire Aquilina; Michelle Vella Wood	+ 4' 17"	not awarded	
Men's time trial	Andreas Miltiadis (CYP)	21' 59.54"	Victor Langellotti (MON)	+ 7.28"	Julio Pintado (AND)	+ 12.93"
Women's time trial	Antri Christoforou (CYP)	18' 53.24"	Elise Maes (LUX)	+ 30.87"	Anne-Sophie Harsch (LUX)	+ 1' 03.62"

=== Mountain biking ===
Event	Gold		Silver		Bronze	
Men's cross-country	Soren Nissen (LUX)	1h 12' 18"	Andreas Miltiadis (CYP)	+ 1' 07"	Guy Díaz Grollier (AND)	+ 1' 40"
Women's cross-country	Fabienne Schaus (LUX)	53' 15"	Antri Christoforou (CYP)	+ 1' 48"	Erla Sigurlaug Sigurðardóttir (ISL)	+ 10' 45"
Men's cross-country team	San Marino; Luca Francioni; Marco Francioni; Federico Olei; Marco Poggiali	3h 54' 20"	Cyprus; Alexandros Matsangos; Andreas Miltiadis; Petros Procopides; Konstantinos Thymides	+ 2' 29"	not awarded	

== Results ==
=== Men's road race ===
Rank	Rider	Country	Time
1	Pit Leyder	Luxembourg	2h 22' 33"
2	Federico Olei	San Marino	s.t.
3	Andrej Petrovski	Monaco	2h 22' 34"
4	Brandon Rivera Vargas	Monaco	s.t.
5	Julio Pintado	Andorra	s.t.
6	Óskar Ómarsson	Iceland	s.t.
7	Etienne Bonello	Malta	s.t.
8	Federico Gasperoni	San Marino	2h 22' 36"
9	Armando Archimandrites	Cyprus	s.t.
10	Anton Orn Elfarsson	Iceland	2h 22' 37"
