= Elsy Jacobs =

Luxembourgish cyclist (1933–1998)

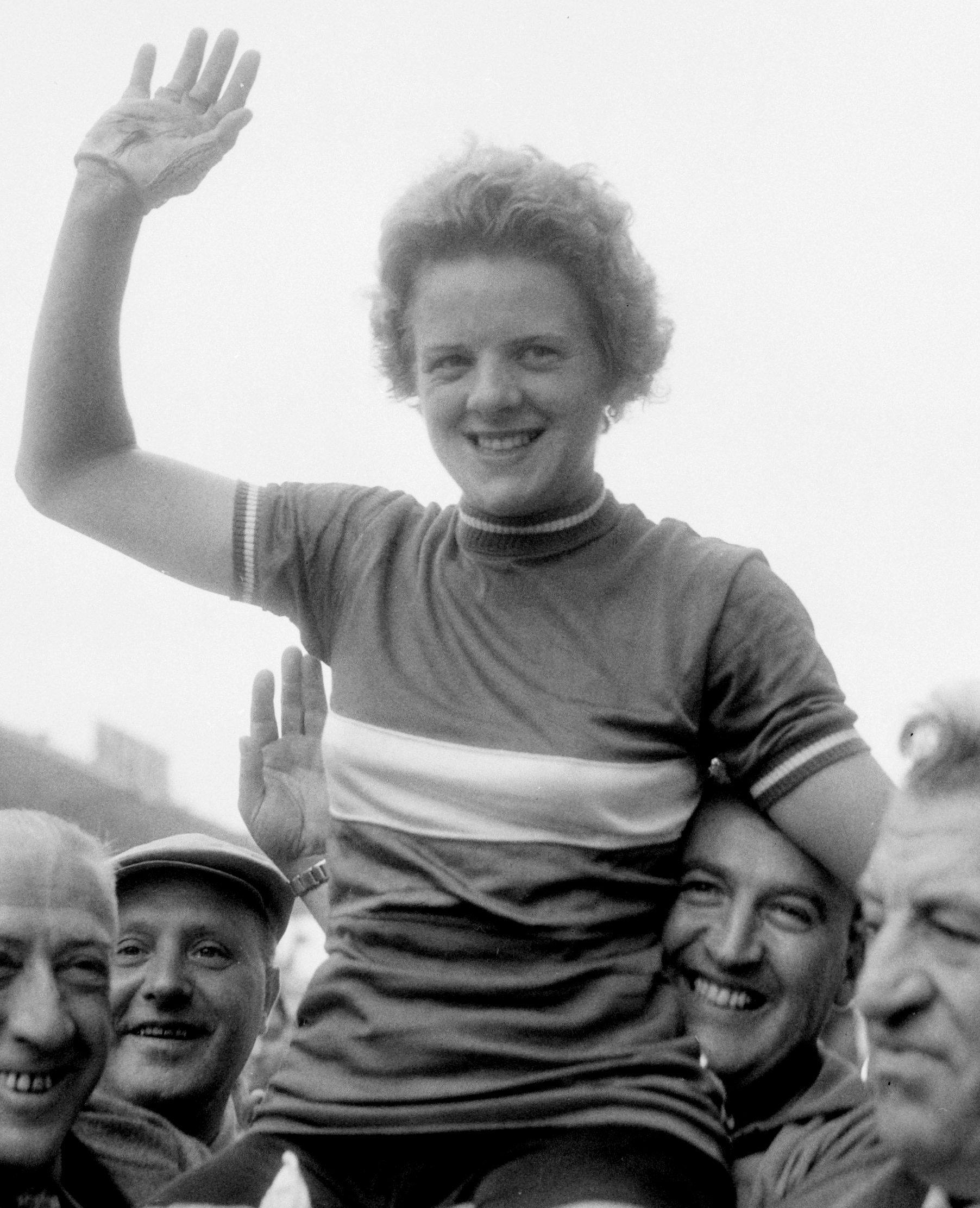
- Jacobs at the 1958 World Championships

Personal information
- Full name: Elsy Jacobs
- Born: 5 March 1933 Garnich, Luxembourg
- Died: 27 February 1998 (aged 64) Guémené-sur-Scorff, France

Cycling career
- Sport: Cycling
- Discipline: Road
- Role: Rider
- Rider type: Endurance

Amateur team
- Gitane

Major wins
- World Champion (Luxembourg) National Champion x15
Medal record
Representing Luxembourg
UCI Road World Championships
Gold medal – first place	Reims 1958	Road race

Elsy Jacobs (4 March 1933 – 27 February 1998) was a Luxembourgish road bicycle racer. She became the first ever women's Road World Champion when she won the inaugural race on 30 August 1958. Later the same year she broke the women's hour record on 9 November, riding 41,347 m on the Vigorelli velodrome in Milan; the record stood for 14 years.

== Biography ==
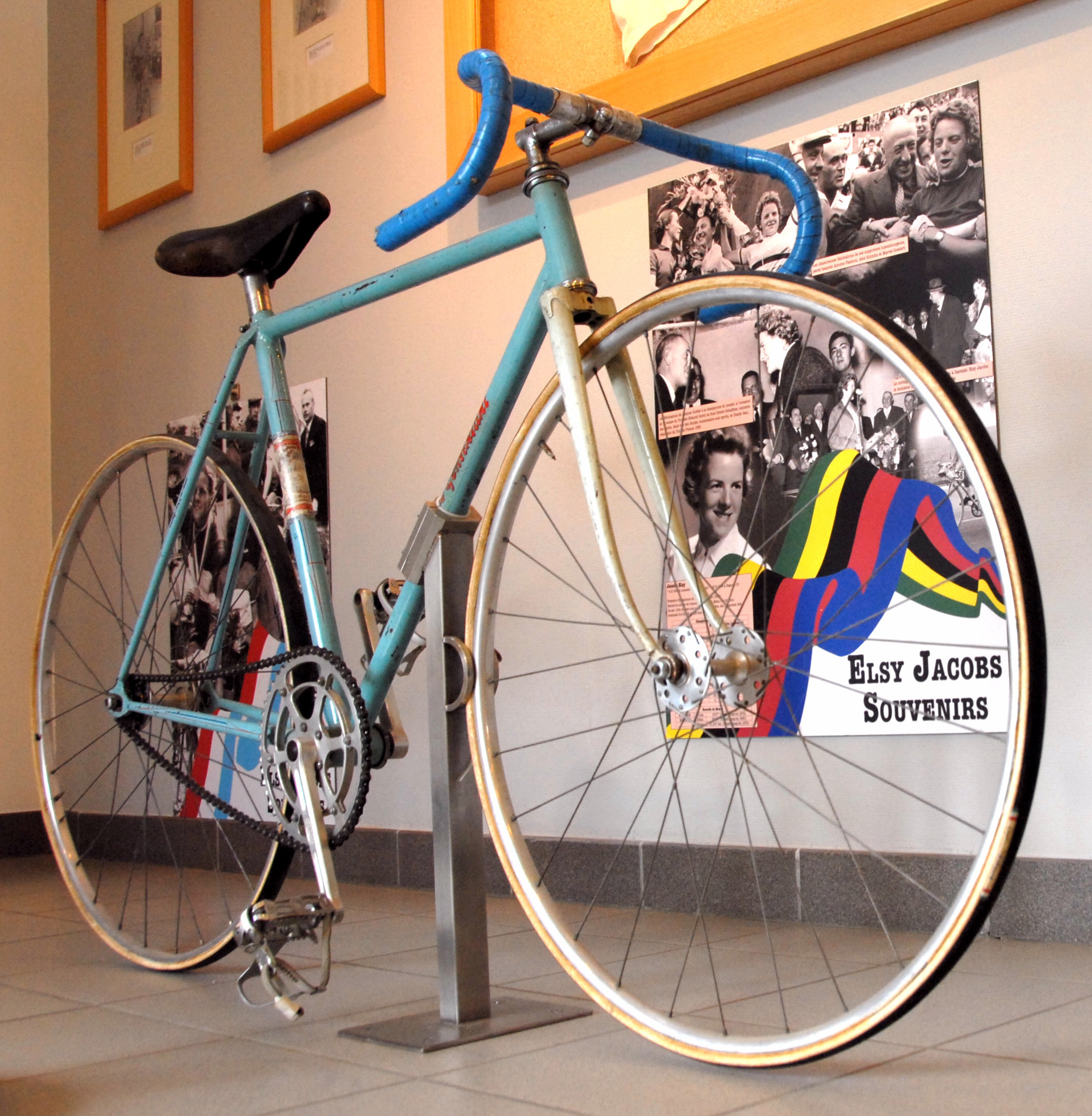
Elsy Jacobs' bicycle at the Centre Sportif Elsy Jacobs in Garnich.

Born in Garnich, Luxembourg, Elsy Jacobs was one of many children; three of her brothers were also racing cyclists, Roger, Raymond and Edmond Jacobs (who competed in the Tour de France).

Both a sports centre and hall were named in her honour. The Grand Prix Elsy Jacobs was established and is based in her home town of Garnich. Since 2008, ten years after her death, the race has appeared on the UCI women's elite cycle racing calendar.

== Palmàres ==
1957
2nd Circuit Lyonnais-Auvergne

1958
Hour record – 41,347 km
1st UCI Road World Championships

1959
2nd Pursuit, UCI Track Cycling World Championships
1st Luxembourg National Road Race Championships

1960
1st Luxembourg National Road Race Championships

1961
1st Luxembourg National Road Race Championships
3rd UCI Road World Championships

1962
1st Luxembourg National Road Race Championships

1963
1st Luxembourg National Road Race Championships

1964
1st Luxembourg National Road Race Championships

1965
1st Luxembourg National Road Race Championships

1966
1st Luxembourg National Road Race Championships
4th UCI Road World Championships

1967
1st Luxembourg National Road Race Championships

1968
1st Luxembourg National Road Race Championships
4th UCI Road World Championships

1970
1st Luxembourg National Road Race Championships

1971
1st Luxembourg National Road Race Championships

1972
1st Luxembourg National Road Race Championships

1973
1st Luxembourg National Road Race Championships

1974
1st Luxembourg National Road Race Championships
