= Andreas Miltiadis =

Cypriot cyclist (born 1996)

Personal information
- Full name: Andreas Miltiadis
- Born: 30 August 1996 (age 30) Palaichori Oreinis, Cyprus
- Height: 1.79 m (5 ft 10 in)
- Weight: 74 kg (163 lb)

Cycling career
- Sport: Cycling
- Current team: Quick Pro Team
- Disciplines: Road; Mountain biking
- Role: Rider
- Rider type: Time trialist

Amateur teams
- 2016–2017: Elite Cycling
- 2018: Guerciotti–Kiwi Atlantico
- 2023: Elite Cycling

Professional teams
- 2019–2022: Guerciotti–Kiwi Atlantico
- 2024: Terengganu Cycling Team
- 2025: Roojai Insurance
- 2026-: Quick Pro Team

Major wins
- National Time Trial Championships (2015–2025) National Road Race Championships (2019–2022, 2024-2025)
Medal record
Representing Cyprus
Men's road cycling
Games of the Small States of Europe
Gold medal – first place	San Marino 2017	Time trial
Gold medal – first place	Andorra la Vella 2025	Time trial
Silver medal – second place	Andorra la Vella 2025	Team road race
Men's mountain biking
Games of the Small States of Europe
Gold medal – first place	Andorra la Vella 2025	Team Cross-country
Silver medal – second place	San Marino 2017	Cross-country
Silver medal – second place	Andorra la Vella 2025	Cross-country
Silver medal – second place	San Marino 2017	Team cross-country

Andreas Miltiadis (born 30 August 1996 in Palaichori Oreinis) is a Cypriot cyclist, who currently rides for UCI Continental team Quick Pro Team.

== Major results ==
2014
National Road Championships

5th Time trial
5th Road race

2015
National Road Championships

1st Time trial
1st Under-23 time trial
2nd Under-23 road race
5th Road race

2nd Cross-country, National Under-23 Mountain Bike Championships
2016
National Road Championships

1st Time trial
1st Under-23 time trial
2nd Under-23 road race

1st Cross-country, National Under-23 Mountain Bike Championships
7th Hets Hatsafon
2017
Games of the Small States of Europe

1st Time trial
2nd Cross-country

National Road Championships

1st Time trial
3rd Road race

2018
National Road Championships

1st Time trial
2nd Road race

2019
National Road Championships

1st Road race
1st Time trial

4th Overall International Tour of Rhodes
2020
National Road Championships

1st Road race
1st Time trial

2021
National Road Championships

1st Road race
1st Time trial

1st Mountains classification International Tour of Rhodes
2022
National Road Championships

1st Road race
1st Time trial

4th Time trial, Mediterranean Games
9th Overall International Tour of Hellas
10th Time trial, Commonwealth Games
2023
1st Time trial, National Road Championships
2nd Overall International Tour of Rhodes

1st Stage 3

6th Overall International Tour of Hellas

1st Mountains classification

2024
National Road Championships

1st Road race
1st Time trial

3rd Overall Tour de Maurice

1st Mountains classification

4th Classique de l'ìle Maurice
6th International Rhodes Grand Prix
2025
National Road Championships

1st Road race
1st Time trial

2nd Overall Tour of Bostonliq
8th Dhofar Classic
2026
1st Stage 3 Tour of Hainan

Sporting positions
Preceded by Michael Christodoulos	Cypriot National Time Trial; Champion; 2015–2025	Succeeded by Incumbent
Preceded by Alexandros Matsangos	Cypriot National Road Race; Champion; 2019–2022	Succeeded by Alexandros Matsangos
Preceded by Alexandros Matsangos	Cypriot National Road Race; Champion; 2024–2025	Succeeded by Incumbent
