= Armanto Archimandritis =

Cypriot cyclist (born 1986)

Personal information
- Born: 12 August 1986 (age 40)

Cycling career
- Sport: Cycling
- Disciplines: Road, Mountain
- Role: Rider

Major wins
- National Road Race Championships (2014, 2016)
Medal record
Representing Cyprus

Armanto Archimandritis (born 12 August 1986) is a Cypriot cyclist.

== Major results ==
=== Road ===
2014
1st National Road Race Championships
2016
National Road Championships

1st Road race
2nd Time trial

9th Hets Hatsafon
2017
3rd National Time Trial Championships
9th Road race, Games of the Small States of Europe
2018
3rd National Road Race Championships
2019
2nd National Road Race Championships
