= Alexandros Agrotis =

Cypriot cyclist (born 1998)

Personal information
- Born: 13 July 1998 (age 28)
- Height: 1.80 m (5 ft 11 in)
- Weight: 72 kg (159 lb)

Cycling career
- Sport: Cycling
- Current team: NSN Development Team
- Discipline: Road
- Role: Rider

Amateur teams
- 2017–2020: CR4C Roanne
- 2021: Hostal Latorre–Ederlan
- 2021: Holdsworth–Zappi
- 2022: Agios Mnason

Professional teams
- 2022: Israel Cycling Academy
- 2024: Matrix Powertag

Major wins
- One-day races and Classics National Road Race Championships (2017)

Alexandros Agrotis (Greek: Αλέξανδρος Αγρότης; born 13 July 1998) is a Cypriot racing cyclist, who currently rides for UCI Continental team Matrix Powertag.

== Major results ==
2015
National Junior Road Championships

2nd Time trial
2nd Road race

2016
National Junior Road Championships

1st Time trial
1st Road race

2017
National Road Championships

1st Road race
2nd Time trial

2018
2nd Time trial, National Road Championships
8th Road race, Mediterranean Games
10th Overall International Tour of Rhodes
2021
National Road Championships

2nd Time trial
2nd Road race

10th Overall International Tour of Rhodes
2022
National Road Championships

2nd Road race
4th Time trial

2024
5th Overall Tour de Kumano
