= Marios Athanasiadis =

Cypriot cross-country mountain biker

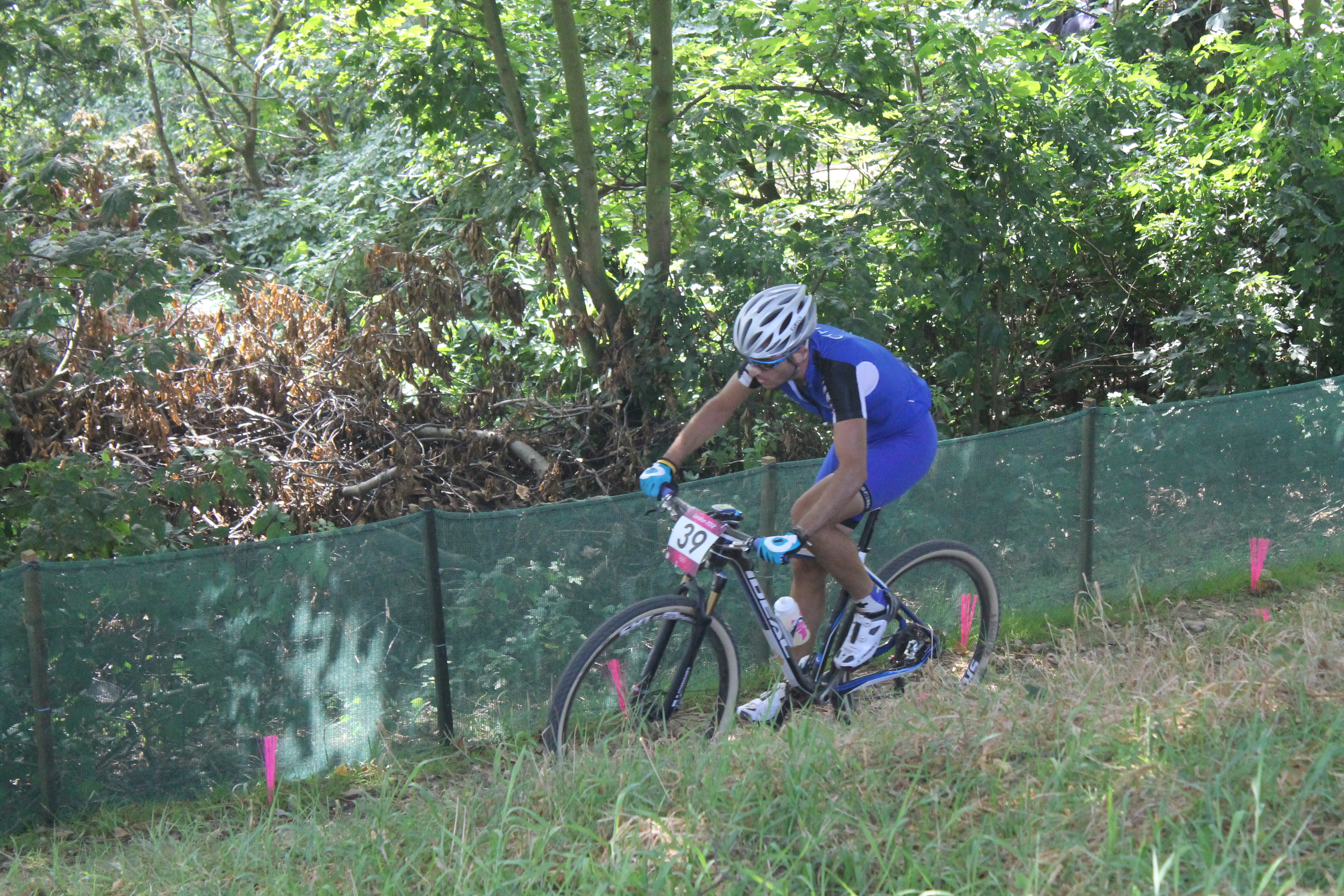
- Athanasiadis at the 2012 Summer Olympics

Personal information
- Born: 31 October 1986 (age 39) Nicosia, Cyprus
- Height: 1.79 m (5 ft 10 in)
- Weight: 70 kg (154 lb)

Cycling career
- Sport: Cycling
- Current team: Retired
- Disciplines: Cross-country; Road
- Role: Rider

Amateur teams
- 2004–2007: Bikin'Cyprus MTB
- 2008: A-Style–Somn
Medal record
Representing Cyprus
Games of the Small States of Europe
Gold medal – first place	2009 Cyprus	Cross-country
Silver medal – second place	2011 Liechtenstein	Cross-country
Silver medal – second place	2013 Luxembourg	Mountain bike

Marios Athanasiadis (born 31 October 1986) is a Cypriot cross-country mountain biker. At the 2012 Summer Olympics, he competed in the Men's cross-country at Hadleigh Farm, finishing in 40th place, the last rider to finish without being lapped. At the 2014 Commonwealth Games he finished in 16th place in the men's cross-country.

He took up cycling at the age of 12, introduced to it by the man who would become his coach. His gold medal at the 2009 Games of the Small States of Europe was Cyprus's first in mountain biking. He was also the Cypriot Youth Ambassador at 2010 Youth Olympic Games.

== Major results ==
=== MTB ===
2003
1st National Junior XCO Championships
2004
1st National XCO Championships
2005
2nd National XCO Championships
3rd Cross-country, Games of the Small States of Europe
2006
1st National XCO Championships
2007
2nd National XCO Championships
2008
1st National XCO Championships
2nd Balkan Under-23 XCO Championships
3rd Balkan XCO Championships
2009
1st Cross-country, Games of the Small States of Europe
2010
1st National XCO Championships
2011
2nd Cross-country, Games of the Small States of Europe
2013
2nd Cross-country, Games of the Small States of Europe

=== Road ===
2008
3rd Time trial, National Road Championships
2009
National Road Championships

2nd Road race
2nd Time trial

2010
2nd Road race, National Road Championships
2011
National Road Championships

1st Time trial
3rd Road race

2012
National Road Championships

1st Time trial
2nd Road race

2013
National Road Championships

1st Road race
1st Time trial

2014
National Road Championships

2nd Road race
3rd Time trial
