= Andrej Petrovski =

Macedonian cyclist (born 1996)

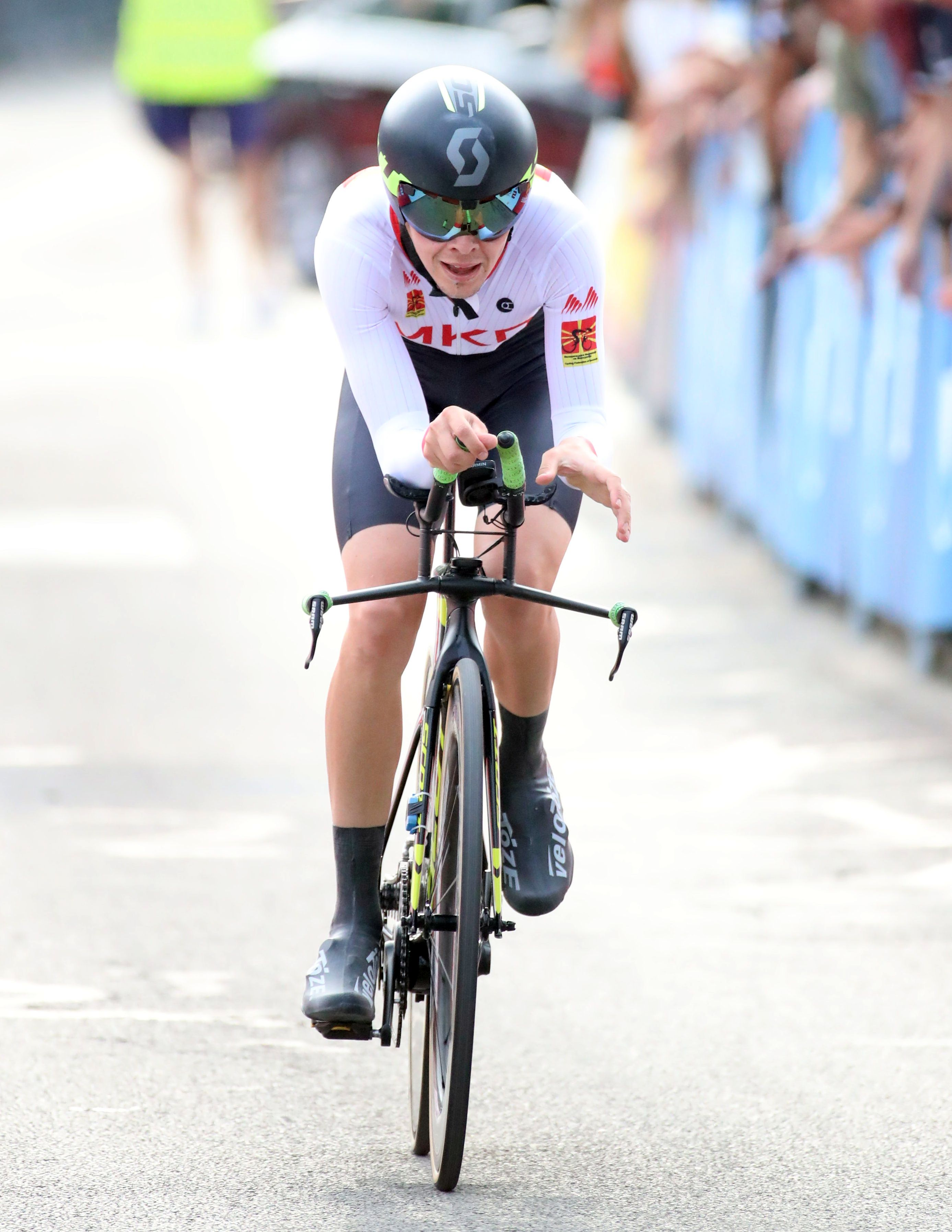

Personal information
- Born: 18 April 1996 (age 30) Kumanovo, Macedonia

Cycling career
- Sport: Cycling
- Current team: Team Möbel Ehrmann
- Discipline: Road
- Role: Rider

Amateur teams
- 2014–2016: World Cycling Centre
- 2016–2017: UC Monaco
- 2018: 0711 / Cycling
- 2019: Velo-M Termafift
- 2019: Hessen–Frankfurt–Opelit
- 2020–: Team Möbel Ehrmann
Medal record
Representing Monaco
Men's road cycling
Games of the Small States of Europe
Bronze medal – third place	San Marino 2017	Road race

Andrej Petrovski (Macedonian: Андреј Петрески, born 18 April 1996) is a Macedonian cyclist, who currently rides for German amateur team Möbel Ehrmann.

== Career ==
Born in Kumanovo, Petrovski began cycling at the age of 10 in his native country. He then moved to Germany with his family, where his father continued to coach him.

In 2014, he joined the World Cycling Centre's development team. Later that year, he competed at the cyclo-cross world championships in the junior race, finishing 32nd. This made him the first ever Macedonian to compete at the world championships.

In 2015, Petrovski finished tenth overall in the Tour of Ankara with the Macedonian national team.

During the 2016 season, Petrovski joined UC Monaco, after an impressive performance at the Giro della Valle d'Aosta.

In May 2017, while competing for Monaco, he won the bronze medal in the road race at the Games of the Small States of Europe.

In 2018, Petrovski joined the German team 0711 / Cycling. In June, he became a dual national champion, winning both the Macedonian national road race and time trial championships.

== Major results ==
2015
10th Overall Tour of Ankara
2017
3rd Road race, Games of the Small States of Europe
2018
National Road Championships

1st Road race
1st Time trial

2019
National Road Championships

1st Road race
1st Time trial

2021
1st Time trial, National Road Championships
2022
National Road Championships

1st Road race
1st Time trial
