= Jan Hugger =

German cyclist (born 1998)

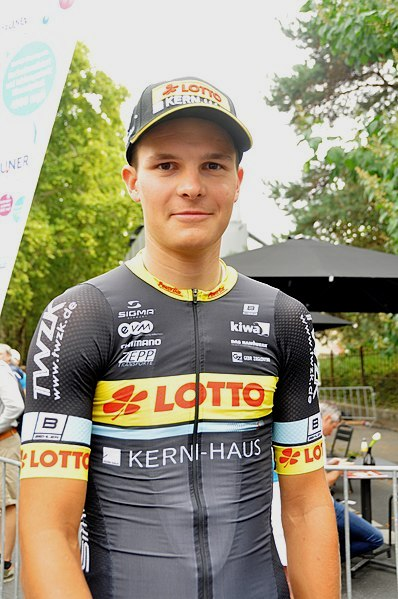

Personal information
- Full name: Jan Hugger
- Born: 10 July 1998 (age 28) Villingen-Schwenningen, Germany
- Height: 1.84 m (6 ft 0 in)

Cycling career
- Sport: Cycling
- Current team: Retired
- Discipline: Road
- Role: Rider

Amateur teams
- 2008–2016: RV Viktoria Niedereschach
- 2015–2016: WRSV Holczer Radsport Team

Professional teams
- 2017: 0711 / Cycling
- 2018–2024: Team Lotto–Kern Haus

Jan Hugger (born 10 July 1998) is a German former racing cyclist, who competed as a professional from 2017 to August 2024. He rode for Team Lotto–Kern Haus in the men's team time trial event at the 2018 UCI Road World Championships.

== Major results ==
2016
10th Overall Ain'Ternational–Rhône Alpes–Valromey Tour
2020
9th Overall International Tour of Rhodes
2021
6th Overall International Tour of Rhodes
