= Elise Maes =

Luxembourgish cyclist (born 1992)

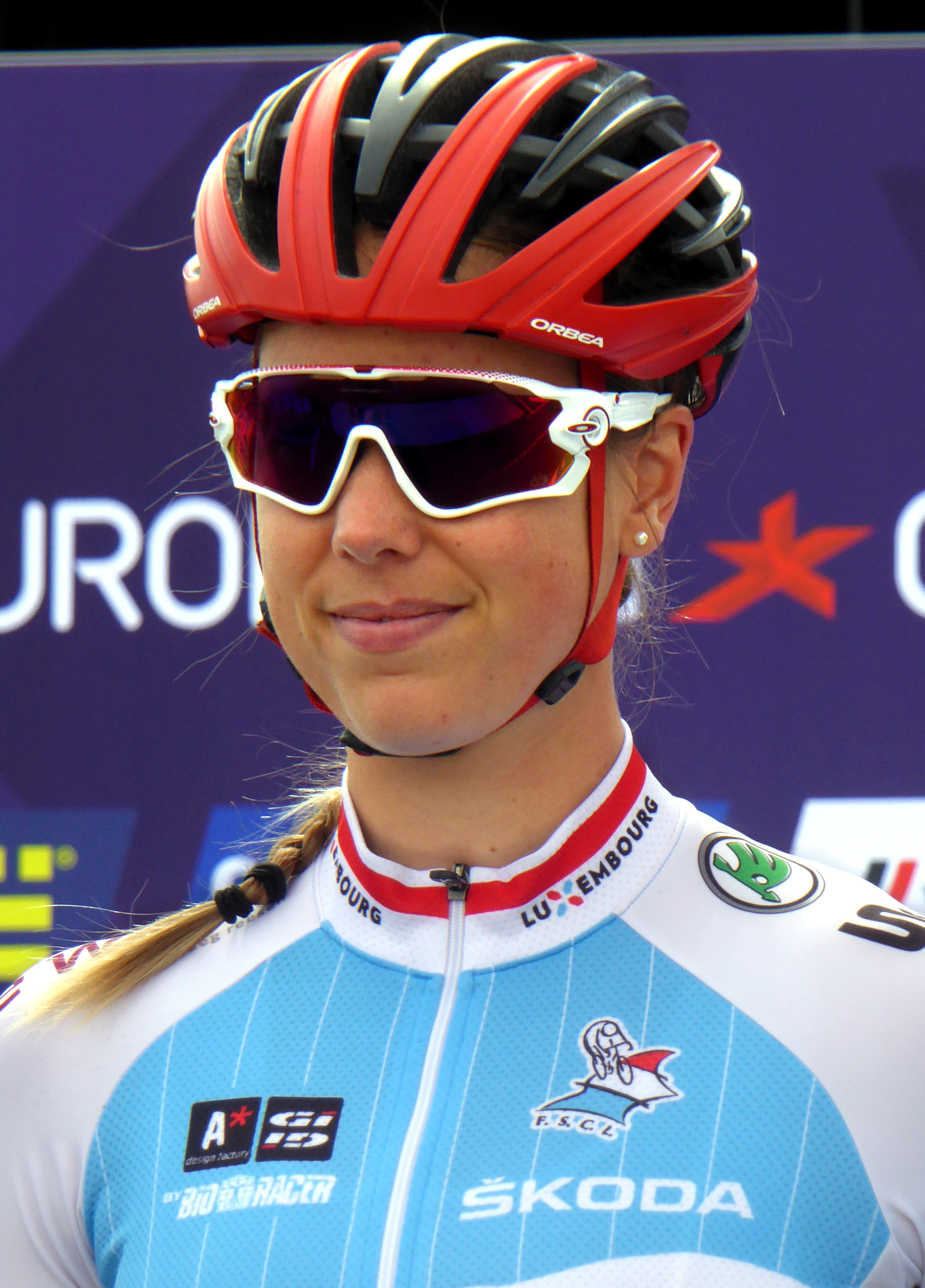
- Maes at the 2018 European Road Cycling Championships.

Personal information
- Born: 27 January 1992 (age 34)

Cycling career
- Sport: Cycling
- Discipline: Road
- Role: Rider

Amateur teams
- 2019: Andy Schleck Cycles–Immo Losch
- 2020: Weston Homes–Torelli–Assure–Fred Whitton

Professional teams
- 2016: Vitalogic Astrokalb Radunion NÖ
- 2017–2018: Team WNT
Medal record
Representing Luxembourg
Games of the Small States of Europe
Gold medal – first place	2017 San Marino	Road race
Gold medal – first place	2017 San Marino	Team road race
Silver medal – second place	2017 San Marino	Time trial

Elise Maes (born 27 January 1992) is a Luxembourgish racing cyclist who most recently rode for British amateur team Weston Homes–Torelli–Assure–Fred Whitton.

== Major results ==
2014
3rd Time trial, National Road Championships
2015
National Road Championships

2nd Time trial
2nd Road race

2016
3rd Time trial, National Road Championships
2017
Games of the Small States of Europe

1st Road race
1st Team road race
2nd Time trial

National Road Championships

2nd Time trial
2nd Road race

2018
National Road Championships

2nd Time trial
2nd Road race

== See also ==
- List of 2016 UCI Women's Teams and riders
