= Jean-Pierre Nuel =

Belgian ophthalmologist and physiologist (1847–1920)

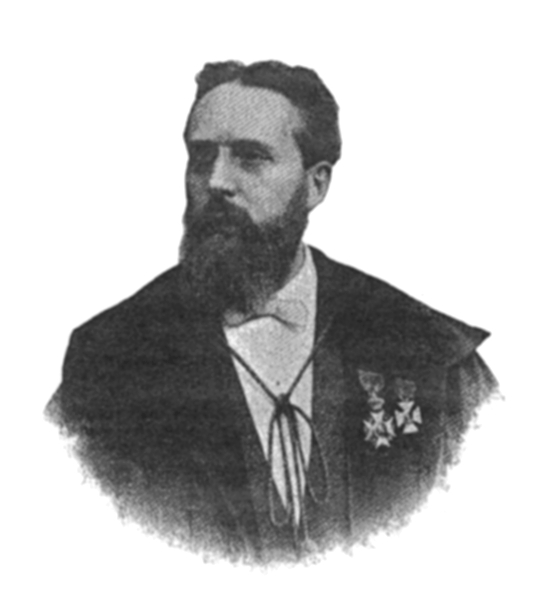
Jean-Pierre Nuel

Jean-Pierre Nuel (February 27, 1847 – August 21, 1920) was a Luxembourgish-Belgian ophthalmologist and physiologist who was a native of Tétange.

In 1870 he earned his doctorate from the University of Ghent, and became licensed to practice surgery and gynecology in Luxembourg. Subsequently, he opened a private practice in the town of Eich (today part of Luxembourg City) and furthered his education in Vienna, Bonn and Utrecht. During this time period, his interest shifted to ophthalmology, and he was particularly inspired by the work of Franciscus Donders (1818–1889) at Utrecht.

In 1877 Nuel became a professor of ophthalmology in Louvain, and later a professor of physiology in Ghent (1880). In 1885 he attained the chair of ophthalmology and physiology of sensory organs at Liège. In the field of otology, he is credited with the discovery of the eponymous "space of Nuel", which is an interval between the outer rods of Corti and the adjacent hair cells.

== Selected writings ==
- Beitrag zur Kenntniss der Säugethierschnecke, (1872).
- Recherches microscopiques sur l ’anatomie du limaçon des mammifères, (1878).
- La Vision edition by Octave Doin, Paris (1904)
