= Stefan Petrovski =

Macedonian bicycle racer

Personal information
- Born: 2 November 1991 (age 34) Kumanovo, Macedonia
- Height: 182 cm (6 ft 0 in)
- Weight: 68 kg (150 lb)

Cycling career
- Sport: Cycling
- Discipline: Road
- Role: Rider

Amateur teams
- 2015: Velo-M
- 2018–2019: Velo-M
- 2021: VK Velo-M
- 2022: Enerix CT

Stefan Petrovski (born 2 November 1991) is a Macedonian cyclist. He is a five-time Macedonian national road race champion, and also won the national time trial championship in 2015.

== Major results ==
2011
1st Road race, National Road Championships
2012
National Road Championships

1st Road race
3rd Time trial

2013
3rd Time trial, National Road Championships
2014
1st Road race, National Road Championships
1st Stage 4 Tour of Kosovo
Tour of Albania

1st Prologue & Stage 3

2015
National Road Championships

1st Road race
1st Time trial

2017
1st Road race, National Road Championships
2019
National Road Championships

3rd Road race
3rd Time trial

2022
2nd Road race, National Road Championships
