= North Macedonia National Road Championships =

National road cycling championships in North Macedonia

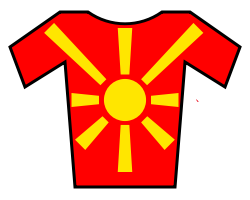

Race details
- Date: June
- Discipline: Road
- Type: One-day race

The North Macedonia National Road Championships are held annually to decide the cycling champions in both the road race and time trial discipline, across various categories.

== Men ==
=== Road race ===
| Year | Winner | Second | Third |
|---|---|---|---|
| 2010 | Gorgi Popstefanov | Goran Kuzmanovski | Joze Jovanov |
| 2011 | Stefan Petrovski | Joze Jovanov | Goran Kuzmanovski |
| 2012 | Stefan Petrovski | Ivica Davidovski | Darko Mitovski |
| 2013 | Predrag Dimevski | Veli Sadiki | Ivica Davidovski |
| 2014 | Stefan Petrovski | Ivica Davidovski | Nikola Djukic |
| 2015 | Stefan Petrovski | Nikola Djukic | Predrag Dimevski |
| 2016 | Gorgi Popstefanov | Ivica Davidovski | Nikola Djukic |
| 2017 | Stefan Petrovski | Nikola Djukic | Mihail Tasevski |
| 2018 | Andrej Petrovski | Nikola Levkov | Daniel Jakovlevski |
| 2019 | Andrej Petrovski | Nikola Levkov | Stefan Petrovski |
| 2020 | Nikola Levkov | Andrej Petrushevski | Milan Nacevski |
| 2021 | Predrag Dimevski | Kristijan Vanchevski | Memet Memedi |
| 2022 | Andrej Petrovski | Stefan Petrovski | Kristijan Vanchevski |

=== Time trial ===
| Year | Winner | Second | Third |
|---|---|---|---|
| 2010 | Joze Jovanov | Borislav Solarski | Boban Andevski |
| 2011 | Boban Andevski | Joze Jovanov | Borislav Solarski |
| 2012 | Joze Jovanov | Zoran Ristovski | Stefan Petrovski |
| 2013 | Zoran Ristovski | Predrag Dimevski | Stefan Petrovski |
| 2014 | Veli Sadiki | Ivica Davidovski | Borislav Solarski |
| 2015 | Stefan Petrovski | Zoran Ristovski | Borislav Solarski |
| 2016 | Darko Simonovski | Jane Trifunovski | Levent Rifat |
| 2017 | Levent Rifat | Darko Simonovski | Jane Trifunovski |
| 2018 | Andrej Petrovski | Nikola Levkov | Gorgi Popstefanov |
| 2019 | Andrej Petrovski | Nikola Levkov | Stefan Petrovski |
| 2020 | Bojan Naumovski | Nikola Levkov | Daniel Jakimovski |
| 2021 | Andrej Petrovski | Daniel Jakimovski | Milan Nacevski |
| 2022 | Andrej Petrovski | Bojan Naumovski | Darko Simonovski |
