= Chantal Hoffmann =

Luxembourgish cyclist (born 1987)

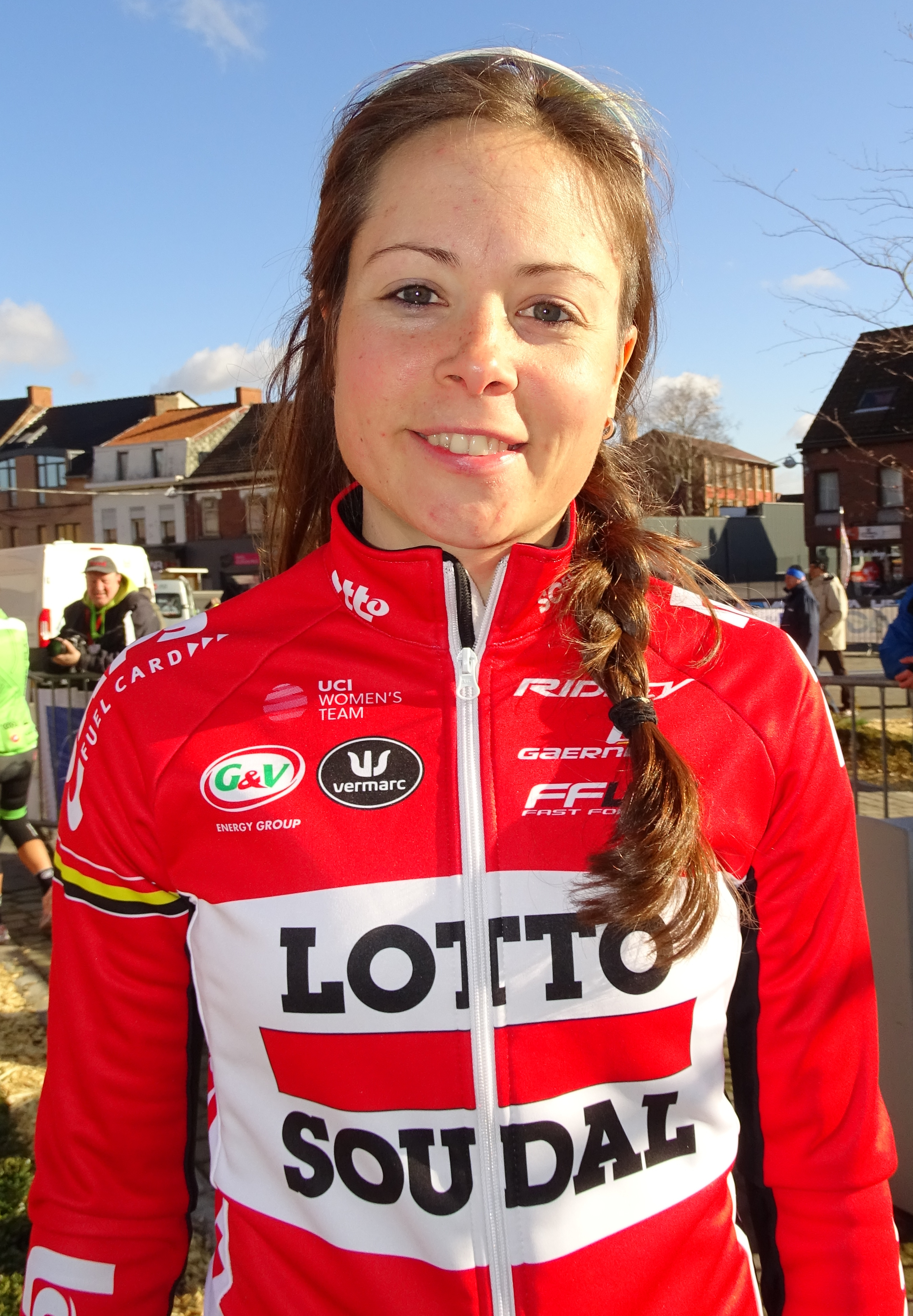
- Hoffmann in 2016.

Personal information
- Full name: Chantal Hoffmann
- Born: 30 October 1987 (age 38) Luxembourg
- Height: 167 cm (5 ft 6 in)
- Weight: 62 kg (137 lb)

Cycling career
- Sport: Cycling
- Current team: Retired
- Discipline: Road
- Role: Rider

Amateur team
- 2010–2013: De Sprinters Malderen

Professional team
- 2014–2019: Lotto–Belisol Ladies
Medal record
Representing Luxembourg
Games of the Small States of Europe
Gold medal – first place	2017 San Marino	Team road race
Bronze medal – third place	2013 Luxembourg	Road race

Chantal Hoffmann (born 30 October 1987) is a Luxembourgish former road cyclist, who rode professionally between 2014 and 2019, entirely for the Lotto–Soudal Ladies team. She participated at the 2011 UCI Road World Championships and at the 2016 Summer Olympics in Rio de Janeiro.

== Major results ==
2013
3rd Road race, Games of the Small States of Europe
National Road Championships

3rd Road race
3rd Time trial

2014
National Road Championships

2nd Road race
2nd Time trial

2015
National Road Championships

3rd Road race
3rd Time trial

2016
2nd Road race, National Road Championships
2017
Games of the Small States of Europe

1st Team road race
7th Road race

3rd Time trial, National Road Championships
10th 7-Dorpenomloop Aalburg
2019
2nd Road race, National Road Championships
