= Fabienne Schauss =

Luxembourgish cyclist

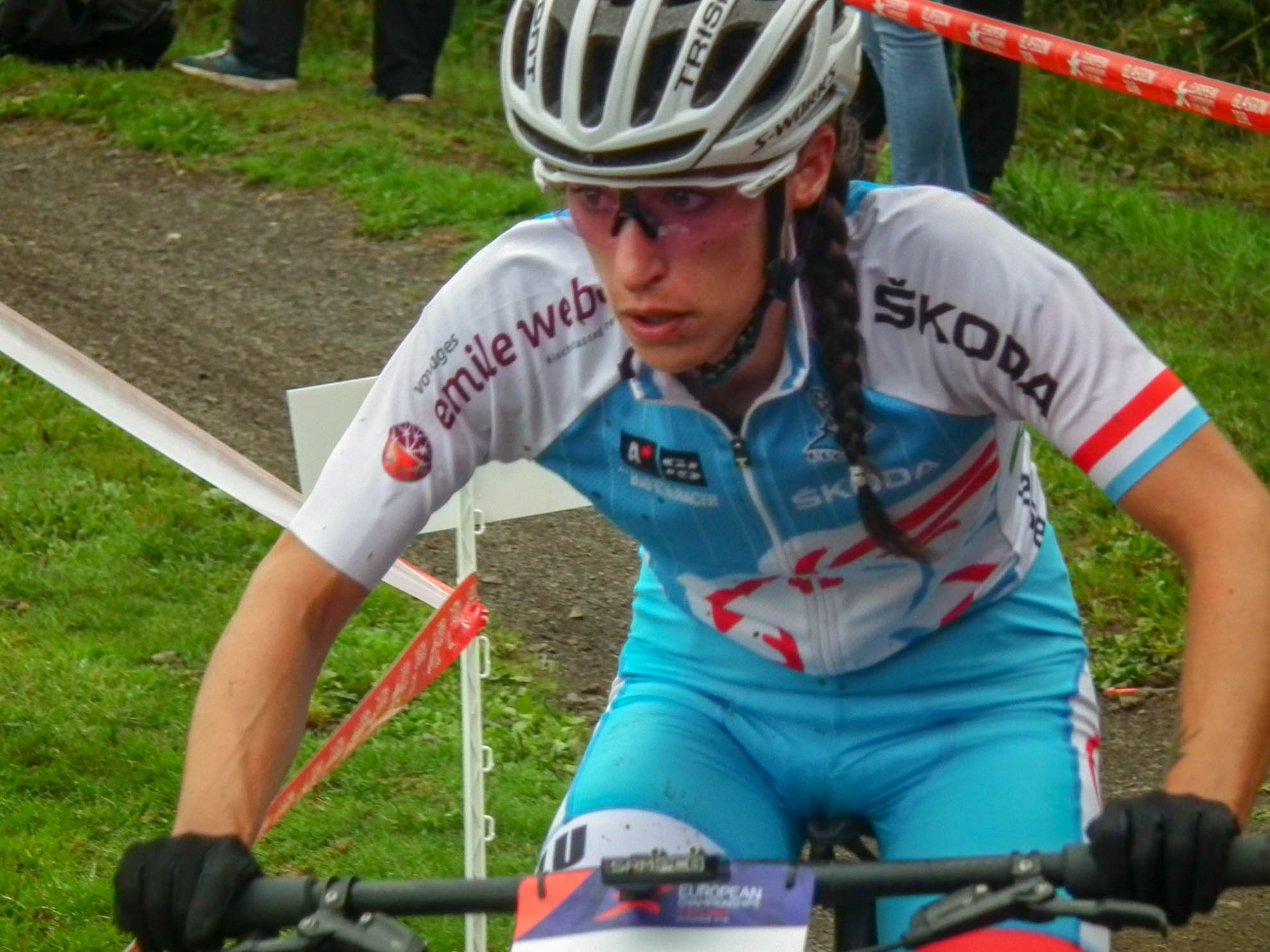
- Schauss in the 2018 European Mountain Bike Championships

Personal information
- Born: 1 September 1984 (age 42) Luxembourg

Cycling career
- Sport: Cycling
- Discipline: Road cycling

Professional teams
- 2011: Team GSD Gestion
- 2012: ABUS - Nutrixxion
Medal record
Representing Luxembourg
Games of the Small States of Europe
| Gold medal – first place | 2017 San Marino | Cross-country |

Fabienne Schauss (born 1 September 1984) is a road cyclist from Luxembourg. She participated at the 2011 UCI Road World Championships. She was on the start list of 2018 Cross-Country European Championships and finished 22.
