= Kim Kirchen =

Luxembourgish cyclist

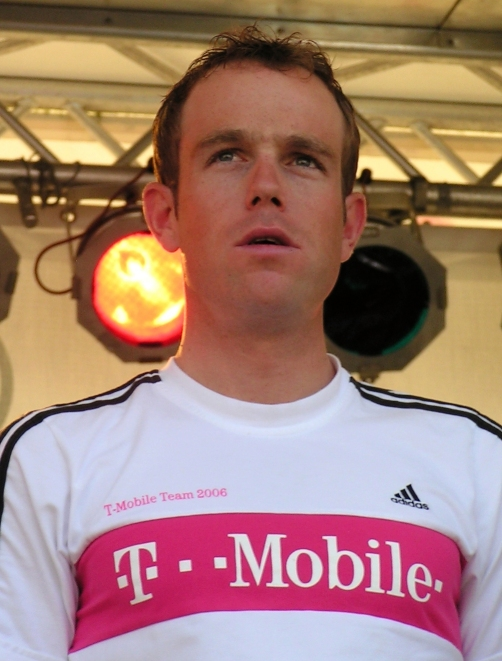
- Kirchen at the 2006 Deutschland Tour

Personal information
- Full name: Kim Kirchen
- Nickname: Grim Kim
- Born: 3 July 1978 (age 48) Luxembourg City, Luxembourg

Cycling career
- Sport: Cycling
- Current team: None
- Discipline: Road
- Role: Rider
- Rider type: All-rounder

Amateur team
- 1999–2000: De Nardi-Pasta Montegrappa

Professional teams
- 2001–2005: Fassa Bortolo
- 2006–2009: T-Mobile Team
- 2010: Team Katusha

Major wins
- Grand Tours Tour de France 2 individual stages (2007, 2008) Stage Races Tour de Pologne (2005) One-Day Races and Classics National Road Race Championships (1999, 2004, 2006) National Time Trial Championships (2008, 2009) La Flèche Wallonne (2008)

Kim Kirchen (born 3 July 1978) is a Luxembourgish former road racing cyclist. He is the son of cyclist Erny Kirchen and the great-nephew of cyclist Jeng Kirchen.

== Career ==
Kirchen signed as a professional cyclist in 2000 with De Nardi-Pasta Montegrappa, and went on to join Fassa Bortolo in 2001. For the 2006 cycling season, he joined the T-Mobile Team following the demise of the Fassa Bortolo team.

His first recorded race was in Dommeldange in 1999, and he had to wait until 2000 for his first professional victory when he won the Piva Col trophy. Kirchen was named the Luxembourgian Sportsman of the Year in 2000, 2003, 2004, 2005, 2007 and 2008, surpassing the achievement of fellow cyclist Charly Gaul and putting him fourth in the all-time stakes.

In July 2008 he showed good form during the Tour de France, placing 7th in the general classification and wearing the yellow jersey for a total of four stages.

In 2010, Kirchen joined Team Katusha, after he was unable to agree with Team Columbia–HTC on a contract extension. He suffered a suspected heart attack during the 2010 Tour de Suisse, in June 2010. He did not race in 2011 because of the heart condition and later retired from the sport.

Since 2011, Kirchen co-commentates all cycling races broadcast on RTL Télé Lëtzebuerg, along with former Cofidis cyclist Tom Flammang.

== Personal life ==
Kim Kirchen was born on 3 July 1978, in Luxembourg. His father, Erny Kirchen, was a cyclist, notably winning the Flèche du Sud and being the national vice-champion in 1974.

Kim Kirchen started cycling at the age of 13 in 1992, with the Amis du Cyclisme de la Commune de Contern (ACC Contern), a renowned Luxembourgish club presided over by Marcel Gilles, where he notably rode alongside Fränk Schleck.

Kim Kirchen married Caroline in 2007. On 8 July 2010, just a few days after he emerged from a coma, his wife gave birth to twins, Liam and Mike.

== Major results ==
1999
1st Road race, National Road Championships
1st Overall Flèche du Sud
1st Coppa Città di San Daniele
4th Road race, UCI Under-23 Road World Championships
2000
1st Trofeo Banca Popolare di Vicenza
2nd Time trial, National Road Championships
2nd Oberall Okolo Slovenska

1st Young rider classification
1st Stage 3

4th Road race, UCI Under-23 Road World Championships
4th Overall Jadranska Magistrala
9th Paris–Tours Espoirs
2001
Tour de Luxembourg

1st Points classification
1st Stage 3

National Road Championships

2nd Time trial
3rd Road race

4th Overall Tour de Pologne
2002
1st Overall Ronde van Nederland

1st Young rider classification

1st Tour de Berne
9th Kuurne–Brussels–Kuurne
10th Overall Regio-Tour
2003
1st Paris–Brussels
1st Stage 6 (TTT) Tour Méditerranéen
4th Overall Tour de Suisse
4th Overall Tour de la Région Wallonne
8th Brabantse Pijl
2004
1st Road race, National Road Championships
1st Stage 5 Tour de Luxembourg
6th Road race, Olympic Games
2005
1st Overall Tour de Pologne

1st Points classification
1st Stage 7a

1st Trofeo Laigueglia
1st Gran Premio di Chiasso
2nd Road race, National Road Championships
2nd La Flèche Wallonne
2nd Coppa Placci
7th Overall Settimana Internazionale di Coppi e Bartali

1st Stages 1b (TTT) & 4

8th Overall Tour Méditerranéen
2006
1st Road race, National Road Championships
Tour de Luxembourg

1st Points classification
1st Prologue

2nd Gran Premio di Lugano
6th Gran Premio di Chiasso
2007
2nd Overall Tour de Suisse
2nd Overall Tirreno–Adriatico
3rd Overall Tour de Pologne
3rd Brabantse Pijl
3rd Milano–Torino
7th Overall Tour de France

1st Stage 15

2008
National Road Championships

1st Time trial
4th Road race

1st La Flèche Wallonne
4th Overall Bayern Rundfahrt
7th Overall Tour de France

1st Stage 4
Held after Stages 6–9
Held after Stages 2–4, 6, 7 & 9

7th Overall Tour de Suisse

1st Stage 6

7th Overall Tour of the Basque Country

1st Stages 2 & 4

2009
National Road Championships

1st Time trial
4th Road race

9th Overall Tour de Suisse

1st Stage 7

2010
6th Trofeo Deià

=== Grand Tour general classification results timeline ===
Grand Tour	2001	2002	2003	2004	2005	2006	2007	2008	2009	2010
Giro d'Italia	—	—	28	—	—	—	—	—	—	—
Tour de France	—	—	—	63	DNF	—	7	7	54	—
Vuelta a España	—	—	—	—	—	—	—	—	DNF	—

Legend
—	Did not compete
DNF	Did not finish
