= Nathalie Lamborelle =

Luxembourgish cyclist

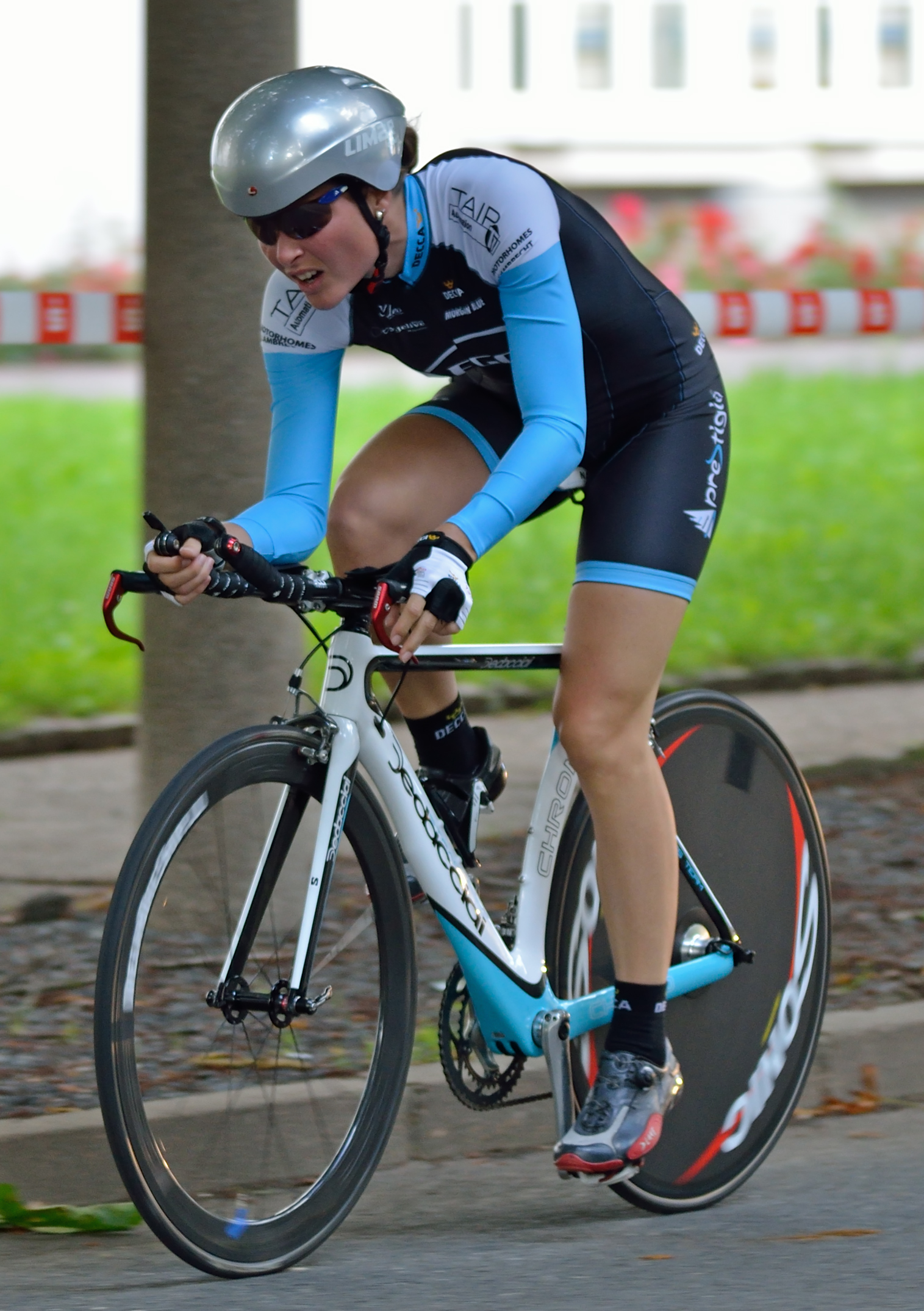
- Lamborelle in 2012

Personal information
- Born: 1 February 1988 (age 38) Luxembourg

Cycling career
- Sport: Cycling
- Discipline: Road cycling

Professional teams
- 2012: Kleo Ladies Team
- 2013: Bigla Cycling Team
Medal record
Representing Luxembourg
Games of the Small States of Europe
Silver medal – second place	Luxembourg 2013	Road race

Nathalie Lamborelle (born 1 February 1988) is a road cyclist from Luxembourg. She participated at the 2007, 2010 and 2011 UCI Road World Championships.
