= Aphrodite Cycling Race Individual Time Trial =

Race details
- Date: March
- Region: Cyprus
- Discipline: Road
- Competition: UCI 1.2 (2019–)
- Type: Time Trial

History
- First edition: 2019
- Editions: 1 (as of 2019)
- First winner: Olga Zabelinskaya (UZB)
- Most wins: No repeat winners
- Most recent: Olga Zabelinskaya (UZB)

The Aphrodite Cycling Race Individual Time Trial is an annual professional road bicycle race for women in Cyprus.

== Winners ==
Year	Country	Rider	Team
2019	Uzbekistan	Olga Zabelinskaya	Cogeas–Mettler–Look
