= Gorgi Popstefanov =

Macedonian road racing cyclist

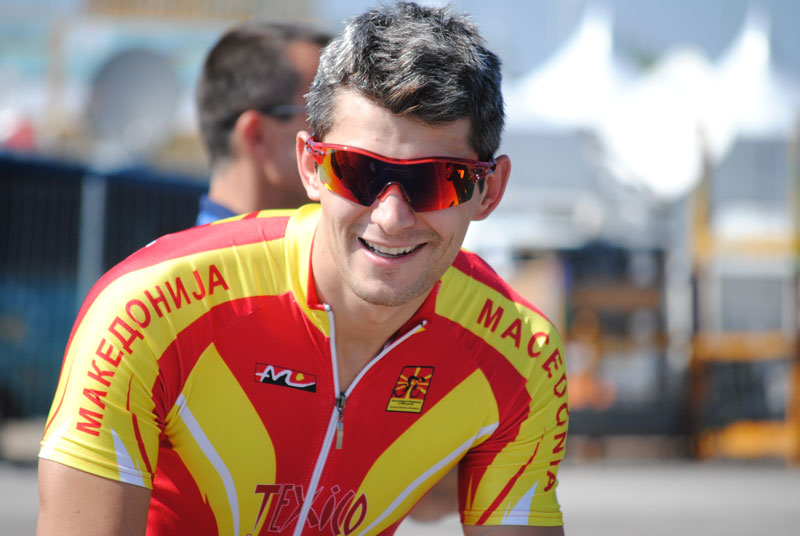
- Popstefanov at the 2014 UCI Road World Championships

Personal information
- Full name: Gorgi Popstefanov
- Born: 19 July 1987 (age 39): Skopje, SR Macedonia, SFR Yugoslavia; (now North Macedonia)
- Height: 1.87 m (6 ft 2 in)
- Weight: 74 kg (163 lb)

Cycling career
- Sport: Cycling
- Current team: Cycle Smart–Shiftgear
- Discipline: Road
- Role: Rider

Amateur teams
- 2012–2019: Metra–Cycles 54
- 2023–: Cycle Smart–Shiftgear

Professional team
- 2020: EuroCyclingTrips–CMI

Gorgi Popstefanov (Macedonian: Ѓорѓи Попстефанов; born 19 July 1987) is a Macedoniann-born American road racing cyclist, who currently rides for club team Cycle Smart–Shiftgear. He is the 2010 and the 2016 Macedonian National Road Race Championships winner. Popstefanov represented Macedonia twice at the UCI Road World Championships, in 2014 and 2015.

== Personal life ==
Born in Skopje, Popstefanov immigrated with his family from SR Macedonia to the United States at the age of 2 and has since split much of his time between the two countries. He grew up in Garfield, New Jersey, graduated from Seton Hall Preparatory School in West Orange, New Jersey in 2005 and received a B.A. in International Affairs from George Washington University's Elliott School of International Affairs in 2009, where he was a member of the varsity crew team. As of May 2013, he completed a J.D. in international law at Seton Hall University School of Law.

== Major results ==
2010
1st Road race, National Road Championships
2016
1st Road race, National Road Championships
2018
3rd Time trial, National Road Championships
