= Hans Rudolf Thull =

German artist (born 1945)

Hans Rudolf Thull (born 6 December 1945) is a German artist who works in the fields of photography, collage and sculpture. He was one of the first German contemporary fine-art photographers to have his work shown in solo exhibitions in German art museums.

== Life and career ==
Thull grew up in Bochum, Germany, in an artistically inclined household; his father was concertmaster of the Bochum symphony orchestra. In 1968 he began studying visual communication/photo design/fine-art photography at the Dortmund University of Applied Sciences and Arts, where Pan Walther was among his teachers; he completed his studies in 1973, receiving his degree as a Diplom Designer.

After finishing his studies he began his career as an independent fine artist. He initially worked almost exclusively in the field of fine-art photography. From 1983 to 1986 he served as a lecturer at the Dortmund University of Applied Sciences and Arts, where he taught primarily experimental and fine-art photography.

During a decisive period lasting from 1989 to 2000 he explored additional art forms: collage and sculpture. His affinity for these areas had already been displayed in isolated earlier works, for example, in his 1985 sculpture "Boden–Raum–Skulptur" for the Ruhr valley project "gRenzüberschreitung".

Thull’s work has been exhibited at major German and international museums in exhibitions organised by prominent curators, such as Thomas Grochowiak and Uwe Rüth. His first exhibition was "Realität – Irrealität", together with Rolf Glasmeier; it was shown at the Ludwig Galerie Schloss Oberhausen and at the Kunsthalle Recklinghausen from 1979 to 1980. He was thus one of the first German contemporary fine-art photographers to have his work shown in solo exhibitions in German art museums.

Hans Rudolf Thull lives and works in Bochum.

== Works ==
In his work the exploration of various phenomena related to dualisms and interaction provide the primary point of departure.

In his photographic works Thull generates dualisms by removing everyday objects and situations from their original framework and placing them in a different context using means that range from unconventional cropping and camera techniques to shaking or moving the camera while shooting. These interactions lead to a break with traditional visual habits, provide motifs with a new identity and reveal dualities. Thus they "contain propositions and possibilities for viewers to stir their imagination and to activate creative impulses through their own contemplation and activity". His photographic series can thus be categorised as examples of experimental photography, and some of them also as "Subjective Photography" (Subjektive Fotografie). Thull works primarily in colour, both with middle-format analogue (film) photography and with full-frame digital SLR.

His collages focus on the duality of media–consumer. Using primarily print media he employs various techniques of cutting, tearing and gluing as well as contradictory arrangements in terms of sequence, accumulation and reduction to generate sensory disruptions – calling into question the perceptual processes that have been imposed upon us: "Everyday symbols have, so to speak, taken over an additional level of reality."

It is generally possible to physically interact with his sculptures made of tubular and plate steel, which take the dualities of viewpoint–perception and surface–space as their theme; they generate interactions between form, material, light, viewer and environment. "By changing standpoints or perspectives a communicatively variable whole is created in the crossing of visual boundaries." The basis of his works is provided either by flat, geometric steel plates – which are lifted from the plane and into space by means of incisions, angling their corners, causing them to buckle and through their placement relative to one another – or by steel pipes, which he toarranges in serial or geometric systems.

== Selected exhibitions ==
1979 Ludwig Galerie Schloss Oberhausen (solo) and Kunsthalle Recklinghausen (solo)

- Realität – Irrealität (with Rolf Glasmeier)

1981 Ludwig Galerie Schloss Oberhausen

- Villa Romana Prize

1983 Osthaus-Museum Hagen

- 20. Ausstellung des Westdeutschen Künstlerbundes

1984 Goethe House New York (solo)

- Four Aspects of Contemporary German Photography

(with Rolf Glasmeier, Robert Häusser and Pan Walther)

1985 Kunstverein im Revier, Essen/Kunstmuseum Gelsenkirchen/Skulpturenmuseum Glaskasten, Marl

- gRenzüberschreitung

1985 Skulpturenmuseum Glaskasten, Marl

- Fotokunst im Ruhrgebiet: 8 Räume – 8 Beispiele

1985 Museum of Modern Art, Toyama, Japan

- First International Triennial for Poster Art

Contribution of the Federal Republic of Germany (with Rolf Glasmeier)

1989 Olympus Galerie, Hamburg (solo)

- Irreale Landschaften

2009 Künstlerzeche Unser Fritz 2/3, Herne

- Industrial Land Art im Ruhrland: gRenzüberschreitung 2

2009 Skulpturenmuseum Glaskasten, Marl

- 50 Jahre künstlerische Gestaltung des Ruhrlandes: Industrial Land Art im Ruhrland

== Public sculptures ==
2002 Open square in front of the Thürmer-Saal/Volksbank Bochum

- Untitled
