= Yannick Peeters =

Belgian cyclist

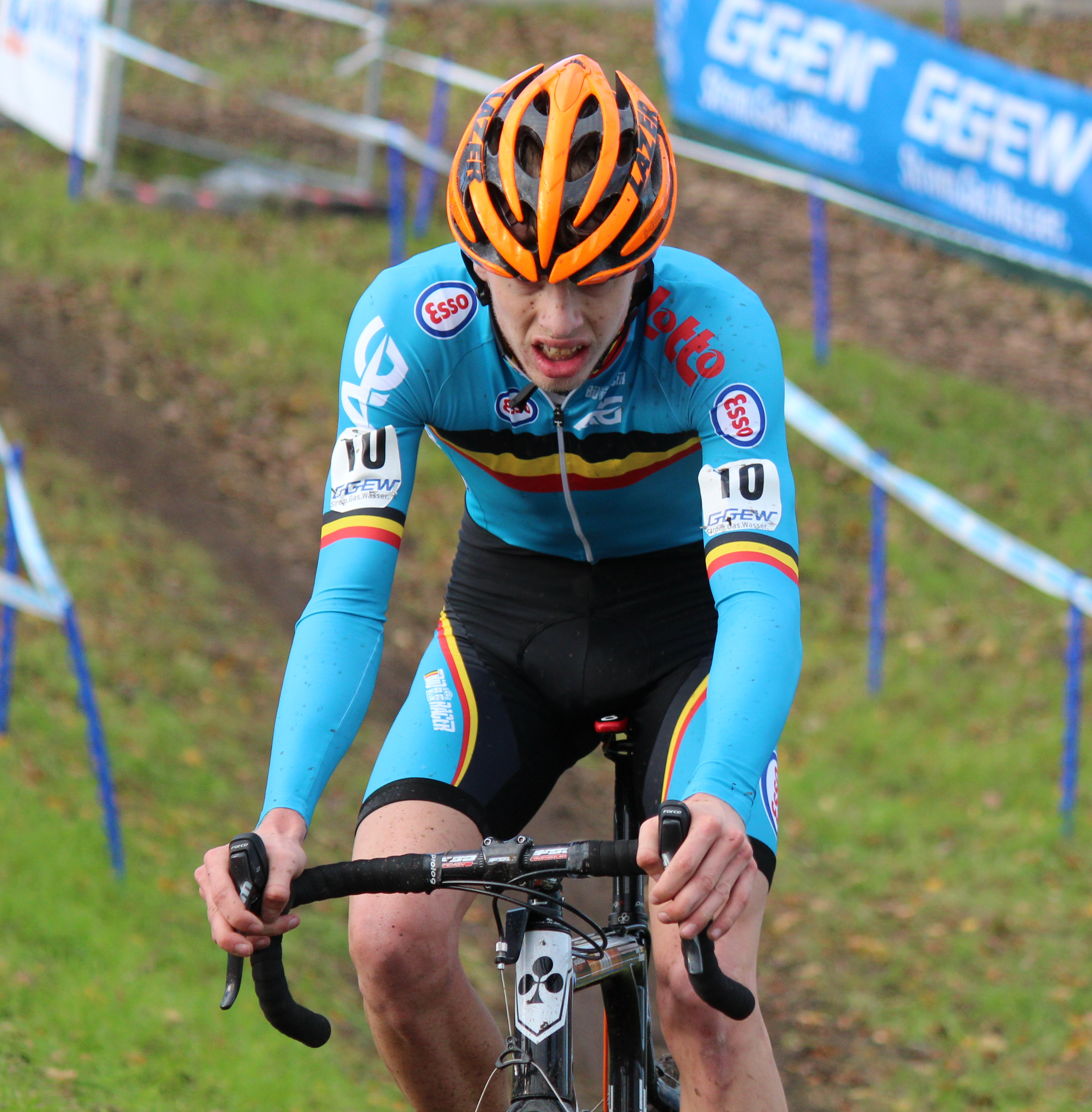
- Yannick Peeters-Cyclist

Personal information
- Born: 15 November 1996 (age 29) La Louvière, Belgium

Cycling career
- Sport: Cycling
- Discipline: Cyclo-cross
- Role: Rider

Yannick Peeters (born 15 November 1996) is a Belgian male cyclo-cross cyclist. He competed in the men's under-23 event at the 2016 UCI Cyclo-cross World Championships in Heusden-Zolder.
