= Eugène Urbany =

Luxembourgish cyclist

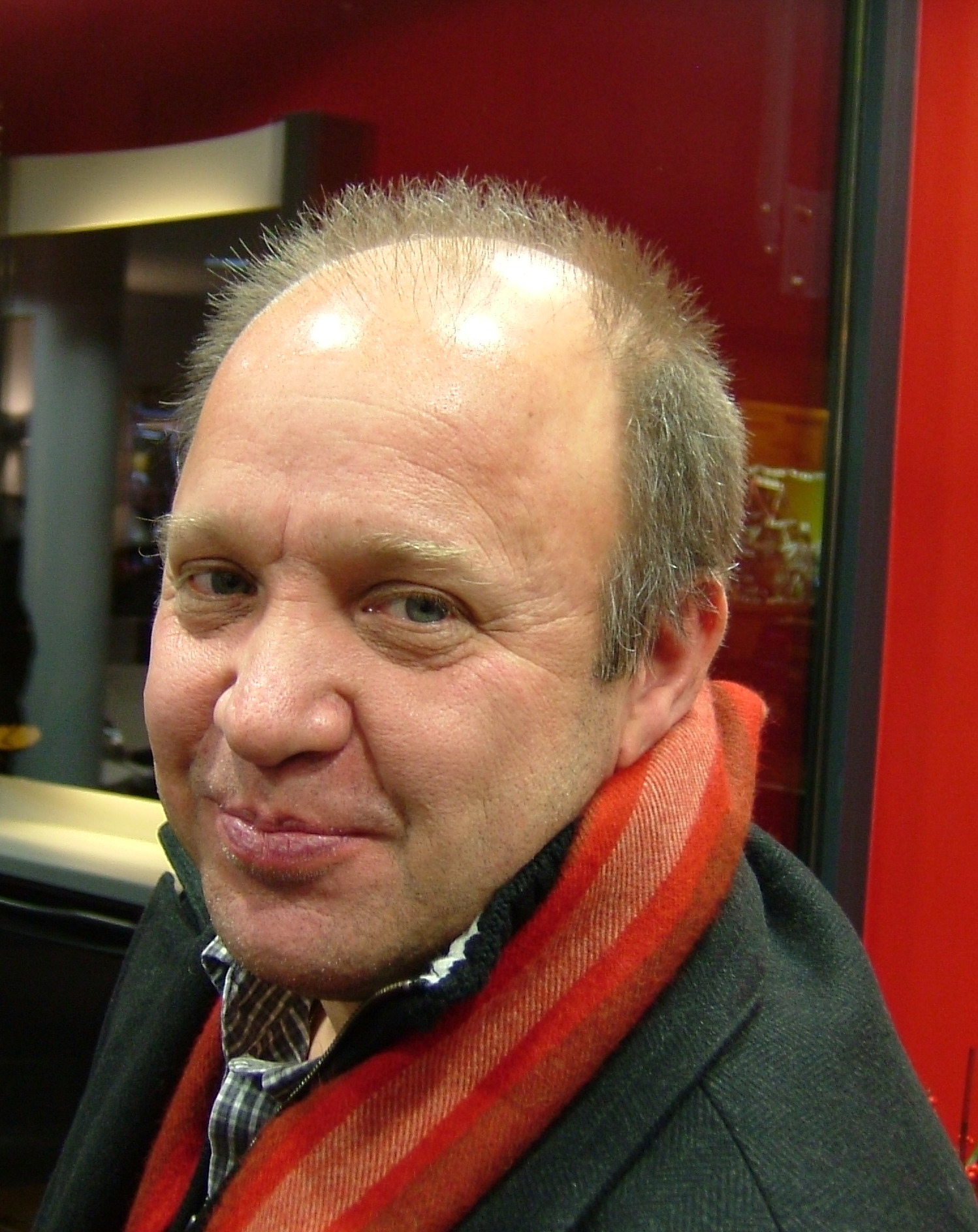

Personal information
- Born: 13 July 1957 (age 69) Dudelange, Luxembourg

Cycling career
- Sport: Cycling
- Role: Rider

Eugène Urbany (born 13 July 1957) is a Luxembourgish former professional racing cyclist. He rode in three editions of the Tour de France and one edition of the Vuelta a España.
