= Marcel Thull =

Luxembourgish cyclist

Personal information
- Born: 24 March 1951 (age 75) Tétange, Luxembourg

Cycling career
- Sport: Cycling

Marcel Thull (born 24 March 1951) is a Luxembourgish former cyclist. He competed in the individual road race event at the 1976 Summer Olympics.
