= Victor Kirchen =

Luxembourgish cyclist

Personal information
- Born: 9 June 1898
- Died: 5 September 1970 (aged 72)

Cycling career
- Sport: Cycling
- Discipline: Road
- Role: Rider

Victor Kirchen (9 June 1898 – 5 September 1970) was a Luxembourgish racing cyclist. He rode in the 1925 Tour de France.
