= Roger Thull =

Luxembourgish cyclist

Personal information
- Born: 22 May 1939 (age 87) Tétange, Luxembourg

Cycling career
- Sport: Cycling

Roger Thull (born 22 May 1939) is a former Luxembourgish cyclist. He competed in the individual road race at the 1960 Summer Olympics.
