= Erny Kirchen =

Luxembourgish cyclist (born 1949)

Personal information
- Born: 7 April 1949 (age 77) Luxembourg City, Luxembourg

Cycling career
- Sport: Cycling

Erny Kirchen (born 7 April 1949) is a Luxembourgish former cyclist. He competed in the individual road race at the 1972 Summer Olympics. He is the nephew of cyclist Jeng Kirchen and the father of cyclist Kim Kirchen.
