= Tétange =

Town in south-western Luxembourg

Coordinates: 49°29′N 6°03′E

Tétange (French pronunciation: [tetɑ̃ʒ]; Luxembourgish: Téiteng; German: Tetingen [ˈteːtɪŋən]) is a town in the commune of Kayl, in south-western Luxembourg. As of September 2026, the town has a population of 3,993. Schlager singer Camillo Felgen and Olympic cyclist Roger Thull were born here.
