= Anne-Sophie Harsch =

Luxembourgish cyclist

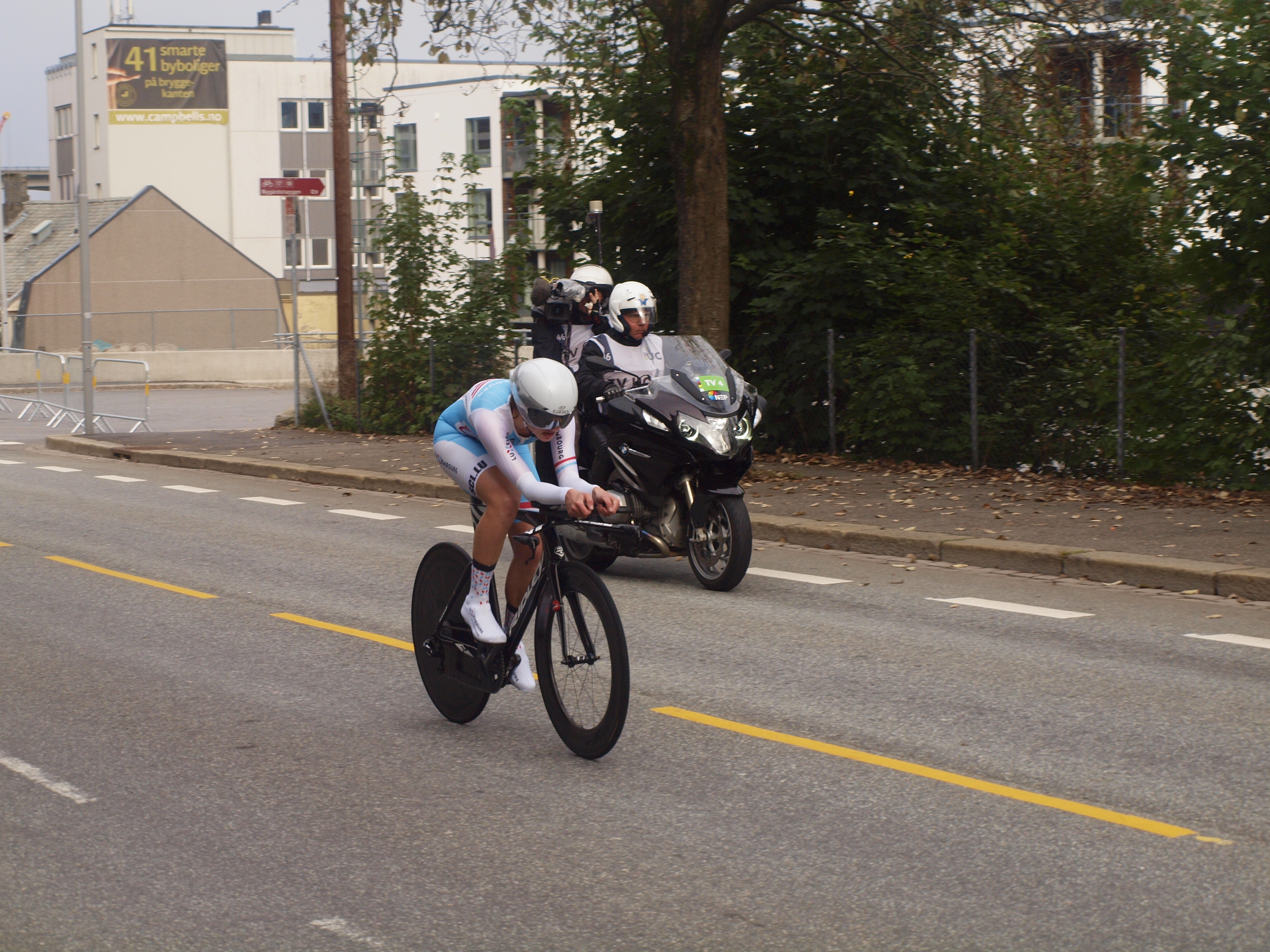
- Harsch at the 2017 World Championships

Personal information
- Born: 3 August 1999 (age 27)

Cycling career
- Sport: Cycling
- Role: Rider

Anne-Sophie Harsch (born 3 August 1999) is a Luxembourgish racing cyclist. She rode in the women's road race event at the 2018 UCI Road World Championships.
