= 2017 Tour de Luxembourg =

2017 UCI Europe Tour

Race details
- Dates: 31 May – 4 June
- Stages: 5 (Note: 4 road stages and a prologue time trial.)
- Distance: 720 km (447.4 mi)
- Winning time: 18h 27' 50"

Results
Jersey awarded to the overall winner	Winner	Greg Van Avermaet (BEL)	(BMC Racing Team)
	Second	Xandro Meurisse (BEL)	(Wanty–Groupe Gobert)
	Third	Anthony Perez (FRA)	(Cofidis)
Jersey awarded to the points classification winner	Points	Greg Van Avermaet (BEL)	(BMC Racing Team)
Jersey awarded to the mountains classification winner	Mountains	Brice Feillu (FRA)	(Fortuneo–Vital Concept)
Jersey awarded to the youth classification winner	Youth	Xandro Meurisse (BEL)	(Wanty–Groupe Gobert)
	Team	Cofidis	

The 2017 Tour de Luxembourg was the 77th edition of the Tour de Luxembourg cycle stage race. It was held between 31 May and 4 June, as part of the 2017 UCI Europe Tour as a 2.HC event. Defending champion Maurits Lammertink did not compete in the race, as he elected to compete in the partly-concurrent Critérium du Dauphiné event in France.

The race was won by Belgium's Greg Van Avermaet, riding for the BMC Racing Team. After winning the second stage of the race, Van Avermaet took the race lead from teammate Jempy Drucker, after finishing second to Cofidis rider Anthony Perez the following day. Van Avermaet cemented the race victory by winning the final stage of the race, ultimately winning the race by 29 seconds overall, and winning the points classification as a result.

Perez held the young rider classification lead going into the final day by just one second ahead of Benjamin Thomas (Armée de Terre) and Xandro Meurisse of Wanty–Groupe Gobert, but Meurisse took the jersey, by finishing in third place on the final stage behind Van Avermaet and WB Veranclassic Aqua Protect's Alex Kirsch, accumulating enough bonus seconds to overhaul both riders into second place overall. Perez completed the podium, seven seconds down on Meurisse. In the race's other classifications, Fortuneo–Vital Concept rider Brice Feillu won the mountains classification, while the teams classification was won by Cofidis, after placing Perez, Luis Ángel Maté and Nicolas Edet in the top ten overall.

== Schedule ==
The race's start and finish towns were announced through the race's Facebook page on 31 January 2017, with further details announced later in the year.

Stage schedule
Stage	Date	Route	Distance	Type	Winner
P	31 May	Luxembourg	2.1 km (1.3 mi)	Individual time trial	Damien Gaudin (FRA)
1	1 June	Luxembourg to Bascharage	172.0 km (106.9 mi)	Flat stage	Jempy Drucker (LUX)
2	2 June	Steinfort to Walferdange	178.4 km (110.9 mi)	Hilly stage	Greg Van Avermaet (BEL)
3	3 June	Eschweiler to Diekirch	192.9 km (119.9 mi)	Hilly stage	Anthony Perez (FRA)
4	4 June	Mersch to Luxembourg	174.6 km (108.5 mi)	Flat stage	Greg Van Avermaet (BEL)
Total		720 km (447.4 mi)			

== Teams ==
14 teams were selected to take place in the 2017 Tour de Luxembourg. BMC Racing Team was the only UCI WorldTeam; eight were UCI Professional Continental teams and five were UCI Continental teams.

UCI WorldTeams

- BMC Racing Team

UCI Professional Continental teams

- Cofidis
- Nippo–Vini Fantini
- Roompot–Nederlandse Loterij
- Sport Vlaanderen–Baloise
- Vérandas Willems–Crelan
- Wanty–Groupe Gobert
- WB Veranclassic Aqua Protect
- Fortuneo–Vital Concept

UCI Continental teams

- Armée de Terre
- Differdange–Losch
- Leopard Pro Cycling
- Team Lotto–Kern Haus
- Team VéloCONCEPT

== Stages ==
=== Prologue ===
31 May 2017 — Luxembourg, 2.1 km (1.3 mi)

Prologue Result and General Classification after Prologue
Rank	Rider	Team	Time
1	Damien Gaudin (FRA)	Armée de Terre	3' 00"
2	Greg Van Avermaet (BEL)	BMC Racing Team	+ 1"
3	Jempy Drucker (LUX)	BMC Racing Team	+ 4"
4	Piet Allegaert (BEL)	Sport Vlaanderen–Baloise	+ 5"
5	Benjamin Thomas (FRA)	Armée de Terre	+ 5"
6	Alex Kirsch (LUX)	WB Veranclassic Aqua Protect	+ 6"
7	Benjamin Declercq (BEL)	Sport Vlaanderen–Baloise	+ 6"
8	Sébastien Delfosse (BEL)	WB Veranclassic Aqua Protect	+ 8"
9	Bert Van Lerberghe (BEL)	Sport Vlaanderen–Baloise	+ 8"
10	Andrea Pasqualon (ITA)	Wanty–Groupe Gobert	+ 8"

=== Stage 1 ===
1 June 2017 — Luxembourg to Bascharage, 172.0 km (106.9 mi)

Result of stage 1
Rank	Rider	Team	Time
1	Jempy Drucker (LUX)	BMC Racing Team	4h 06' 06"
2	Timothy Dupont (BEL)	Vérandas Willems–Crelan	+ 0"
3	Aksel Nõmmela (EST)	Leopard Pro Cycling	+ 0"
4	Bert Van Lerberghe (BEL)	Sport Vlaanderen–Baloise	+ 0"
5	Greg Van Avermaet (BEL)	BMC Racing Team	+ 0"
6	Michael Carbel (DEN)	Team VéloCONCEPT	+ 0"
7	Justin Jules (FRA)	WB Veranclassic Aqua Protect	+ 0"
8	Riccardo Stacchiotti (ITA)	Nippo–Vini Fantini	+ 0"
9	Jelle Donders (BEL)	Differdange–Losch	+ 0"
10	Kévin Ledanois (FRA)	Fortuneo–Vital Concept	+ 0"

General classification after stage 1
Rank	Rider	Team	Time
1	Jempy Drucker (LUX)	BMC Racing Team	4h 09' 00"
2	Damien Gaudin (FRA)	Armée de Terre	+ 6"
3	Greg Van Avermaet (BEL)	BMC Racing Team	+ 7"
4	Raphael Freienstein (GER)	Team Lotto–Kern Haus	+ 8"
5	Piet Allegaert (BEL)	Sport Vlaanderen–Baloise	+ 10"
6	Benjamin Thomas (FRA)	Armée de Terre	+ 11"
7	Alex Kirsch (LUX)	WB Veranclassic Aqua Protect	+ 12"
8	Benjamin Declercq (BEL)	Sport Vlaanderen–Baloise	+ 12"
9	Aksel Nõmmela (EST)	Leopard Pro Cycling	+ 13"
10	Sébastien Delfosse (BEL)	WB Veranclassic Aqua Protect	+ 14"

=== Stage 2 ===
2 June 2017 — Steinfort to Walferdange, 178.4 km (110.9 mi)

Result of stage 2
Rank	Rider	Team	Time
1	Greg Van Avermaet (BEL)	BMC Racing Team	4h 34' 47"
2	Jempy Drucker (LUX)	BMC Racing Team	+ 0"
3	Alexander Kamp (DEN)	Team VéloCONCEPT	+ 0"
4	Maxime Bouet (FRA)	Fortuneo–Vital Concept	+ 0"
5	Huub Duyn (NED)	Vérandas Willems–Crelan	+ 0"
6	Alexander Krieger (GER)	Leopard Pro Cycling	+ 0"
7	Pierpaolo De Negri (ITA)	Nippo–Vini Fantini	+ 0"
8	Pim Ligthart (NED)	Roompot–Nederlandse Loterij	+ 0"
9	Fabien Canal (FRA)	Armée de Terre	+ 0"
10	Andrea Pasqualon (ITA)	Wanty–Groupe Gobert	+ 0"

General classification after stage 2
Rank	Rider	Team	Time
1	Jempy Drucker (LUX)	BMC Racing Team	8h 43' 41"
2	Greg Van Avermaet (BEL)	BMC Racing Team	+ 1"
3	Piet Allegaert (BEL)	Sport Vlaanderen–Baloise	+ 13"
4	Alex Kirsch (LUX)	WB Veranclassic Aqua Protect	+ 14"
5	Raphael Freienstein (GER)	Team Lotto–Kern Haus	+ 14"
6	Benjamin Thomas (FRA)	Armée de Terre	+ 17"
7	Sébastien Delfosse (BEL)	WB Veranclassic Aqua Protect	+ 20"
8	Huub Duyn (NED)	Vérandas Willems–Crelan	+ 20"
9	Andrea Pasqualon (ITA)	Wanty–Groupe Gobert	+ 20"
10	Pim Ligthart (NED)	Roompot–Nederlandse Loterij	+ 21"

=== Stage 3 ===
3 June 2017 — Eschweiler to Diekirch, 192.9 km (119.9 mi)

Result of stage 3
Rank	Rider	Team	Time
1	Anthony Perez (FRA)	Cofidis	4h 58' 16"
2	Greg Van Avermaet (BEL)	BMC Racing Team	+ 0"
3	Xandro Meurisse (BEL)	Wanty–Groupe Gobert	+ 0"
4	Nicolas Edet (FRA)	Cofidis	+ 1"
5	Maxime Bouet (FRA)	Fortuneo–Vital Concept	+ 1"
6	Alexander Kamp (DEN)	Team VéloCONCEPT	+ 1"
7	Rasmus Guldhammer (DEN)	Team VéloCONCEPT	+ 1"
8	Huub Duyn (NED)	Vérandas Willems–Crelan	+ 1"
9	Luis Ángel Maté (ESP)	Cofidis	+ 1"
10	Julien Loubet (FRA)	Armée de Terre	+ 1"

General classification after stage 3
Rank	Rider	Team	Time
1	Greg Van Avermaet (BEL)	BMC Racing Team	13h 41' 52"
2	Anthony Perez (FRA)	Cofidis	+ 22"
3	Benjamin Thomas (FRA)	Armée de Terre	+ 23"
4	Xandro Meurisse (BEL)	Wanty–Groupe Gobert	+ 23"
5	Huub Duyn (NED)	Vérandas Willems–Crelan	+ 26"
6	Yoann Bagot (FRA)	Cofidis	+ 28"
7	Piet Allegaert (BEL)	Sport Vlaanderen–Baloise	+ 28"
8	Raphael Freienstein (GER)	Team Lotto–Kern Haus	+ 29"
9	Luis Ángel Maté (ESP)	Cofidis	+ 30"
10	Julien Loubet (FRA)	Armée de Terre	+ 30"

=== Stage 4 ===
4 June 2017 — Mersch to Luxembourg, 174.6 km (108.5 mi)

Result of stage 4
Rank	Rider	Team	Time
1	Greg Van Avermaet (BEL)	BMC Racing Team	4h 46' 08"
2	Alex Kirsch (LUX)	WB Veranclassic Aqua Protect	+ 0"
3	Xandro Meurisse (BEL)	Wanty–Groupe Gobert	+ 0"
4	Luis Ángel Maté (ESP)	Cofidis	+ 3"
5	Alessandro Bisolti (ITA)	Nippo–Vini Fantini	+ 4"
6	Anthony Perez (FRA)	Cofidis	+ 4"
7	Huub Duyn (NED)	Vérandas Willems–Crelan	+ 4"
8	Jérôme Baugnies (BEL)	Wanty–Groupe Gobert	+ 4"
9	Rasmus Guldhammer (DEN)	Team VéloCONCEPT	+ 4"
10	Julien Loubet (FRA)	Armée de Terre	+ 4"

Final general classification
Rank	Rider	Team	Time
1	Greg Van Avermaet (BEL)	BMC Racing Team	18h 27' 50"
2	Xandro Meurisse (BEL)	Wanty–Groupe Gobert	+ 29"
3	Anthony Perez (FRA)	Cofidis	+ 36"
4	Benjamin Thomas (FRA)	Armée de Terre	+ 40"
5	Huub Duyn (NED)	Vérandas Willems–Crelan	+ 40"
6	Luis Ángel Maté (ESP)	Cofidis	+ 43"
7	Julien Loubet (FRA)	Armée de Terre	+ 44"
8	Jérôme Baugnies (BEL)	Wanty–Groupe Gobert	+ 47"
9	Nicolas Edet (FRA)	Cofidis	+ 48"
10	Rasmus Guldhammer (DEN)	Team VéloCONCEPT	+ 50"

== Classification leadership table ==
In the 2017 Tour de Luxembourg, four jerseys were awarded. The general classification was calculated by adding each cyclist's finishing times on each stage. Time bonuses were awarded to the first three finishers on all stages except for the individual time trial: the stage winner won a ten-second bonus, with six and four seconds for the second and third riders respectively. Bonus seconds were also awarded to the first three riders at intermediate sprints – three seconds for the winner of the sprint, two seconds for the rider in second and one second for the rider in third. The leader of the general classification received a yellow jersey. This classification was considered the most important of the 2017 Tour de Luxembourg, and the winner of the classification was considered the winner of the race.

Points for stage victory
Position	1	2	3	4	5	6	7	8	9	10
Points awarded	20	16	13	11	9	7	5	3	2	1

The second classification was the points classification. Riders were awarded points for finishing in the top ten in a stage, with the exception of the prologue. Unlike in the points classification in the Tour de France, the winners of all stages were awarded the same number of points. The leader of the points classification was awarded a blue jersey.

Points for the mountains classification
Position	1	2	3	4
Points for Category 1	5	3	2	1
Points for Category 2	3	2	1	0

There was also a mountains classification, for which points were awarded for reaching the top of a climb before other riders. Each climb was categorised as either first, or second-category, with more points available for the more difficult, higher-categorised climbs. For first-category climbs, the top four riders earned points, while on second-category climbs, only the top three riders earned points. The leadership of the mountains classification was marked by a purple jersey.

The fourth jersey represented the young rider classification, marked by a white jersey. Only riders born after 1 January 1991 were eligible; the young rider best placed in the general classification was the leader of the young rider classification. There was also a classification for teams, in which the times of the best three cyclists in a team on each stage were added together; the leading team at the end of the race was the team with the lowest cumulative time.

Stage	Winner	General classification	Points classification	Mountains classification	Young rider classification	Team classification
P	Damien Gaudin	Damien Gaudin	Not awarded (Note: During the prologue, no points were awarded for the points or mountains classifications. For sponsorship reasons, the jerseys were worn in stage one by Greg Van Avermaet (blue points jersey), who was second overall, and Jempy Drucker (purple mountains jersey), who was third overall.)	Not awarded	Piet Allegaert	BMC Racing Team
1	Jempy Drucker	Jempy Drucker	Jempy Drucker (Note: In stage 2, Timothy Dupont, who was second in the points classification, wore the blue jersey, because Jempy Drucker (in first place) wore the yellow jersey as leader of the general classification during that stage.) (Note: In stage 3, Greg Van Avermaet, who was second in the points classification, wore the blue jersey, because Jempy Drucker (in first place) wore the yellow jersey as leader of the general classification during that stage.)	Tom Wirtgen	Raphael Freienstein	BMC Racing Team
2	Greg Van Avermaet	Jempy Drucker	Jempy Drucker	Brice Feillu	Piet Allegaert	BMC Racing Team
3	Anthony Perez	Greg Van Avermaet	Greg Van Avermaet (Note: In stage 4, Jempy Drucker, who was second in the points classification, wore the blue jersey, because Greg Van Avermaet (in first place) wore the yellow jersey as leader of the general classification during that stage.)	Brice Feillu	Anthony Perez	Cofidis
4	Greg Van Avermaet	Greg Van Avermaet	Greg Van Avermaet	Brice Feillu	Xandro Meurisse	Cofidis
Final		Greg Van Avermaet	Greg Van Avermaet	Brice Feillu	Xandro Meurisse	Cofidis

== Final standings ==
Legend
Yellow jersey	Denotes the leader of the General classification
Blue jersey	Denotes the leader of the Points classification
Purple jersey	Denotes the leader of the Mountains classification
White jersey	Denotes the leader of the Young rider classification

=== General classification ===
Result
Rank	Rider	Team	Time
1	Greg Van Avermaet (BEL)	BMC Racing Team	18h 27' 50"
2	Xandro Meurisse (BEL)	Wanty–Groupe Gobert	+ 29"
3	Anthony Perez (FRA)	Cofidis	+ 36"
4	Benjamin Thomas (FRA)	Armée de Terre	+ 40"
5	Huub Duyn (NED)	Vérandas Willems–Crelan	+ 40"
6	Luis Ángel Maté (ESP)	Cofidis	+ 43"
7	Julien Loubet (FRA)	Armée de Terre	+ 44"
8	Jérôme Baugnies (BEL)	Wanty–Groupe Gobert	+ 47"
9	Nicolas Edet (FRA)	Cofidis	+ 48"
10	Rasmus Guldhammer (DEN)	Team VéloCONCEPT	+ 50"

=== Points classification ===
Result
Rank	Rider	Team	Points
1	Greg Van Avermaet (BEL)	BMC Racing Team	65
2	Jempy Drucker (LUX)	BMC Racing Team	36
3	Anthony Perez (FRA)	Cofidis	27
4	Xandro Meurisse (BEL)	Wanty–Groupe Gobert	26
5	Maxime Bouet (FRA)	Fortuneo–Vital Concept	20
6	Alexander Kamp (DEN)	Team VéloCONCEPT	20
7	Huub Duyn (NED)	Vérandas Willems–Crelan	17
8	Alex Kirsch (LUX)	WB Veranclassic Aqua Protect	16
9	Timothy Dupont (BEL)	Vérandas Willems–Crelan	16
10	Luis Ángel Maté (ESP)	Cofidis	13

=== Mountains classification ===
Result
Rank	Rider	Team	Points
1	Brice Feillu (FRA)	Fortuneo–Vital Concept	52
2	Dimitri Peyskens (BEL)	WB Veranclassic Aqua Protect	27
3	Kasper Asgreen (DEN)	Team VéloCONCEPT	16
4	Kevin Van Melsen (BEL)	Wanty–Groupe Gobert	13
5	Tom Wirtgen (LUX)	Leopard Pro Cycling	13
6	Martijn Budding (NED)	Roompot–Nederlandse Loterij	11
7	Luis Ángel Maté (ESP)	Cofidis	6
8	Alex Kirsch (LUX)	WB Veranclassic Aqua Protect	6
9	Gaëtan Pons (LUX)	Leopard Pro Cycling	6
10	Alexander Kamp (DEN)	Team VéloCONCEPT	5

=== Young rider classification ===
Result
Rank	Rider	Team	Time
1	Xandro Meurisse (BEL)	Wanty–Groupe Gobert	18h 28' 19"
2	Anthony Perez (FRA)	Cofidis	+ 7"
3	Benjamin Thomas (FRA)	Armée de Terre	+ 11"
4	Franck Bonnamour (FRA)	Fortuneo–Vital Concept	+ 24"
5	Alexander Krieger (GER)	Leopard Pro Cycling	+ 29"
6	Raphael Freienstein (GER)	Team Lotto–Kern Haus	+ 29"
7	Martijn Tusveld (NED)	Roompot–Nederlandse Loterij	+ 32"
8	Etienne van Empel (NED)	Roompot–Nederlandse Loterij	+ 53"
9	Fabien Doubey (FRA)	Wanty–Groupe Gobert	+ 58"
10	Szymon Rekita (POL)	Leopard Pro Cycling	+ 58"

=== Teams classification ===
Result
Rank	Team	Time
1	Cofidis	55h 25' 44"
2	Wanty–Groupe Gobert	+ 26"
3	Armée de Terre	+ 29"
4	Fortuneo–Vital Concept	+ 38"
5	Team VéloCONCEPT	+ 1' 42"
6	Roompot–Nederlandse Loterij	+ 1' 43"
7	Nippo–Vini Fantini	+ 2' 29"
8	WB Veranclassic Aqua Protect	+ 3' 09"
9	BMC Racing Team	+ 3' 31"
10	Leopard Pro Cycling	+ 4' 13"
