= Crocodile Trophy =

Race details
- Date: October
- Region: North Queensland, Australia
- Discipline: Mountain bike racing
- Type: Stage race
- Organiser: Gerhard Schönbacher
- Race director: Gerhard Schönbacher
- Web site: www.crocodile-trophy.com

History
- First edition: 1995
- Editions: 26 (as of 2022)
- First winner: Harald Maier (AUT); Meg Carrigan (AUS)
- Most wins: 5 Urs Huber (SUI)
- Most recent: Wolfgang Krenn (AUT); Elodie Kuijper (NED)

The Crocodile Trophy is an annual eight-day mountain bike stage race held in North Queensland, Australia. The race typically covers around 750 kilometres (466 mi) over 8 stages and used to be known as one of the most demanding mountain bike races in the world, called 'the hardest, longest and most adventurous MTB race in the world'. In recent years however the race became more and more accessible. The race is however still known for the heat and the rough terrain of the Australian Outback.

== History ==
The race was originally intended to take place in Vietnam. The event would last 18 days, starting in Saigon and finishing in Hanoi. But after spending two weeks in Vietnam race organisers Gerhard Schönbacher realized it was not possible to organise the event in Vietnam. Later on he found an alternative in Darwin and decided that the first route of the Crocodile Trophy would run from Darwin to Cairns. The race's route would change every year.

== Classifications ==
The Crocodile Trophy's leaders jersey is awarded after each stage to the rider with the lowest overall time. The rider who has the lowest overall time will wear the jersey at the next stage. The cyclist who is awarded the jersey after the final stage is the overall winner of the race.

The first five riders to cross the finish line at each stage will score points that count toward the Points classification. The rider who holds the most points will wear a special jersey.

== Winners ==
| Year | Winner Male | Winner Female |
|---|---|---|
| 1995 | Harald Maier (AUT) | Meg Carrigan (AUS) |
| 1996 | Harald Maier (AUT) | Brigitte Kurka (AUT) |
| 1997 | Jaap Viergever (NED) | Regina Stanger (AUT) |
| 1998 | Harald Maier (AUT) | no entries |
| 1999 | Jaap Viergever (NED) | no entries |
| 2000 | Simon Apperloo (NED) | Carrie Edwards (USA) |
| 2001 | Jaap Viergever (NED) | Mieke Deroo (BEL) |
| 2002 | Jaap Viergever (NED) | Mieke Deroo (BEL) |
| 2003 | Roland Stauder (ITA) | Rosi King (AUS) |
| 2004 | Adam Hansen (AUS) | Anita Waiss (AUT) |
| 2005 | Adam Hansen (AUS) | Kim Proctor (AUS) |
| 2006 | Christoph Stevens (BEL) | Dominique Angerer (AUT) |
| 2007 | Mauro Bettin (ITA) | Michela Benzoni (ITA) |
| 2008 | Ondrej Fojtik (CZE) | Karen Steurs (BEL) |
| 2009 | Urs Huber (SUI) | Monique Zeldenrust (NED) |
| 2010 | Urs Huber (SUI) | Abby McLennan (AUS) |
| 2011 | Jeroen Boelen (NED) | Jessica Douglas (AUS) |
| 2012 | Ivan Rybařík (CZE) | Kate Major (AUS) |
| 2013 | Mark Frendo (AUS) | Liesbeth Hessens (BEL) |
| 2014 | Greg Saw (AUS) | Imogen Smith (AUS) |
| 2015 | Urs Huber (SUI) | Sarah White (AUS) |
| 2016 | Urs Huber (SUI) | Alice Pirard (BEL) |
| 2017 | Leandre Bouchard (CAN) | Haley Smith (CAN) |
| 2018 | Urs Huber (SUI) | Sarah White (AUS) |
| 2019 | Alan Gordon (RSA) | Angelica Tazreiter (AUT) |
| 2022 | Wolfgang Krenn (AUT) | Elodie Kuijper (NED) |

=== Wins per country ===
| Wins men | Country |
|---|---|
| 6 | Netherlands |
| 5 | Switzerland |
| 4 | Australia; Austria |
| 2 | Czech Republic; Italy |
| 1 | Belgium; Canada; South Africa |

| Wins women | Country |
|---|---|
| 9 | Australia |
| 5 | Austria; Belgium |
| 2 | Netherlands |
| 1 | Canada; Italy; United States |
