= Urs Huber =

Swiss mountain biker

Personal information
- Full name: Urs Huber
- Born: 12 August 1985 (age 41) Muri, Aargau
- Height: 1.84 m (6 ft 0 in)
- Weight: 67 kg (148 lb; 10.6 st)

Cycling career
- Sport: Cycling
- Discipline: Mountain Bike
- Role: Rider
- Rider type: Marathon
Medal record
Representing Switzerland
Men's Mountain bike marathon
World Championships
Bronze medal – third place	2008 Villabassa	Men's race

Urs Huber (born 12 August 1985) is a Swiss Mountain biker. Huber is a specialist in marathon rides.

== Career Highlights ==
2005
1st Overall iXS Swiss Bike Classic
2006
1st Overall iXS Swiss Bike Classic
2007
1st Overall iXS Swiss Bike Classic
1st Overall iXS Euro Bike Extremes
2008
1st Overall iXS Swiss Bike Classic
1st Dolomiti Superbike
1st Iron Bike Race
3rd UCI Mountain Bike Marathon World Championships
2009
1st Overall Crocodile Trophy

1st Stage 1
1st Stage 8

1st Overall Rocky Mountain Marathon Series
1st Overall iXS Swiss Bike Classic
2010
1st Overall Crocodile Trophy

1st Stage 1
1st Stage 10

1st Overall Rocky Mountain Marathon Series
1st Dolomiti Superbike
2011
1st National Marathon Champion
1st overall Craft Bike TransAlp (with Konny Looser)

1st Stage 1
1st Stage 4
1st Stage 5
1st Stage 6

1st Dolomiti Superbike
1st Stage 2 Crocodile Trophy
1st Stage 3 Crocodile Trophy
