= Stade Am Pëtz =

Football stadium in Wiltz, Luxembourg

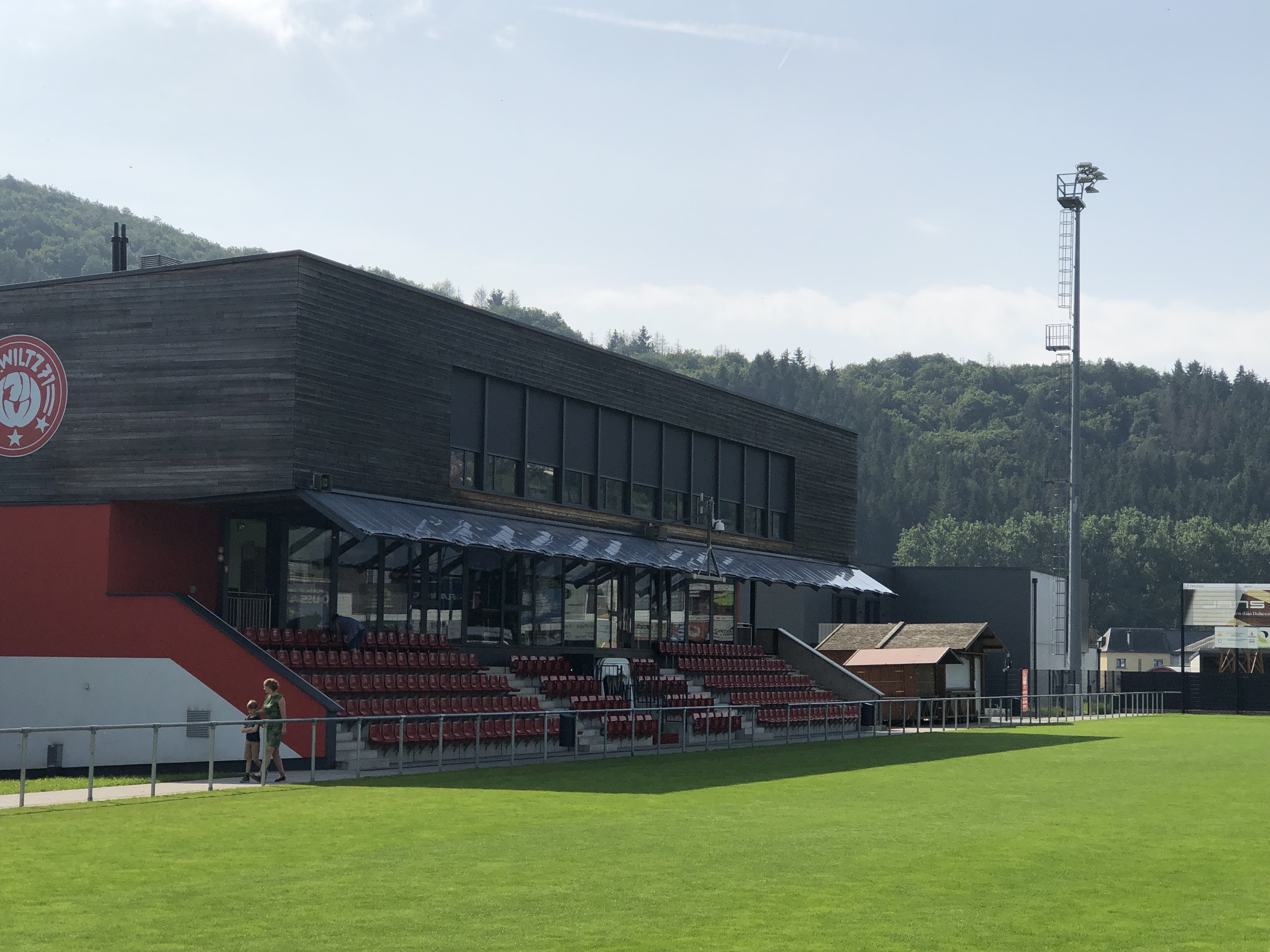
- Stade Am Pëtz, Wiltz, Luxembourg
- Interactive map of Stade Am Pëtz
- Full name: Stade Am Pëtz
- Location: Wiltz, Luxembourg
- Coordinates: 49.9741°N 5.9418°E
- Capacity: 3,000
- Surface: grass

Tenant
- FC Wiltz 71

Stade Am Pëtz is a football stadium in Weidingen, Wiltz, in northern Luxembourg.

It is currently the home stadium of FC Wiltz 71. The stadium has a capacity of 3,000. FC Wiltz used to play at the Stade Géitz, near the town centre.

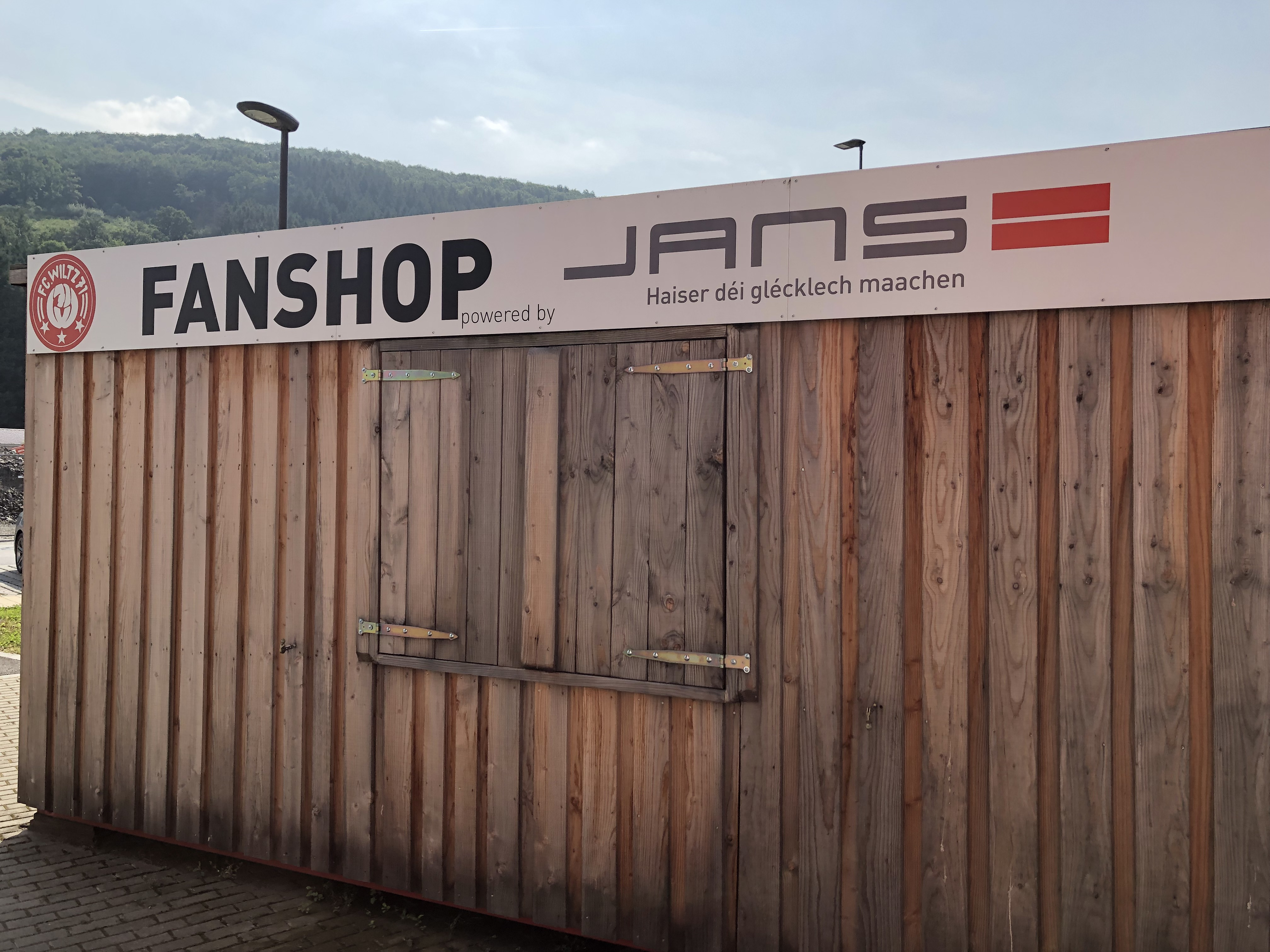
Stade Am Pëtz, FC Wiltz fanshop
