= 2016 Tour de Luxembourg =

2016 UCI Europe Tour

Race details
- Dates: 1–5 June
- Stages: 4 + Prologue

Results
Jersey awarded to the overall winner	Winner	Maurits Lammertink (NED)	(Roompot–Oranje Peloton)
	Second	Philippe Gilbert (BEL)	(BMC Racing Team)
	Third	Alex Kirsch (LUX)	(Stölting Service Group)
Jersey awarded to the points classification winner	Points	Philippe Gilbert (BEL)	(BMC Racing Team)
Jersey awarded to the mountains classification winner	Mountains	Brice Feillu (FRA)	(Fortuneo–Vital Concept)
Jersey awarded to the youth classification winner	Youth	Maurits Lammertink (NED)	(Roompot–Oranje Peloton)
	Team	Cofidis	

The 2016 Tour de Luxembourg is the 76th edition of the Tour de Luxembourg cycle stage race. It is part of the 2016 UCI Europe Tour as a 2.HC event.

== Schedule ==
Stage	Date	Course	Distance	Type	Winner	Ref
P	1 June	Luxembourg	2.8 km (1.7 mi)	Individual time trial	Jean-Pierre Drucker (LUX)	
1	2 June	Luxembourg to Hesperange	170.6 km (106.0 mi)	Hilly stage	André Greipel (GER)	
2	3 June	Rosport to Schifflange	162.8 km (101.2 mi)	Hilly stage	Philippe Gilbert (BEL)	
3	4 June	Eschweiler to Differdange	177.4 km (110.2 mi)	Hilly stage	Anthony Turgis (FRA)	
4	5 June	Mersch to Luxembourg	178.2 km (110.7 mi)	Flat stage	Philippe Gilbert (BEL)	
Total						

== Teams ==
15 teams were selected to take place in the 2016 Tour de Luxembourg. Five of these were UCI WorldTeams; seven were UCI Professional Continental teams and three were UCI Continental teams.

UCI WorldTeams

- BMC Racing Team
- IAM Cycling
- Lotto–Soudal
- Tinkoff
- Orica–GreenEDGE

UCI Professional Continental teams

- Cofidis
- Fortuneo–Vital Concept
- ONE Pro Cycling
- Roompot–Oranje Peloton
- Stölting Service Group
- Topsport Vlaanderen–Baloise
- Wanty–Groupe Gobert

Continental teams

- Differdange–Losch
- Leopard Pro Cycling
- Wallonie-Bruxelles–Group Protect

== Stages ==
=== Prologue ===
1 June 2016 – Luxembourg

Prologue Result and General Classification after Prologue
Rank	Rider	Team	Time
1	Jempy Drucker (LUX)	BMC Racing Team	4' 20"
2	Maurits Lammertink (NED)	Roompot–Oranje Peloton	+3"
3	Tom Bohli (SUI)	BMC Racing Team	+4"
4	Pieter Vanspeybrouck (BEL)	Topsport Vlaanderen–Baloise	+5"
5	Marco Marcato (ITA)	Wanty–Groupe Gobert	+6"
6	Alexander Edmondson (AUS)	Orica–GreenEDGE	+7"
7	Alexander Krieger (GER)	Leopard Pro Cycling	+7"
8	Caleb Ewan (AUS)	Orica–GreenEDGE	+9"
9	Matthias Brändle (AUT)	IAM Cycling	+9"
10	Alex Kirsch (LUX)	Stölting Service Group	+10"
Source: ProCyclingStats

=== Stage 1 ===
2 June 2016 – Luxembourg to Hesperange, 170.6 km (106.0 mi)

Result of stage 1
Rank	Rider	Team	Time
1	André Greipel (GER)	Lotto–Soudal	4h 13' 07"
2	Adam Blythe (GBR)	Fortuneo–Vital Concept	s.t.
3	Amaury Capiot (BEL)	Topsport Vlaanderen–Baloise	s.t.
4	Pieter Vanspeybrouck (BEL)	Topsport Vlaanderen–Baloise	s.t.
5	Clément Venturini (FRA)	Cofidis	s.t.
6	Jempy Drucker (LUX)	BMC Racing Team	s.t.
7	Gerald Ciolek (GER)	Stölting Service Group	s.t.
8	Marco Marcato (ITA)	Wanty–Groupe Gobert	s.t.
9	Alexander Edmondson (AUS)	Orica–GreenEDGE	s.t.
10	Steele Von Hoff (AUS)	ONE Pro Cycling	s.t.
Source: ProCyclingStats

General classification after stage 1
Rank	Rider	Team	Time
1	Jempy Drucker (LUX)	BMC Racing Team	4h 17' 27"
2	Maurits Lammertink (NED)	Roompot–Oranje Peloton	+ 3"
3	Tom Bohli (SUI)	BMC Racing Team	+ 4"
4	Pieter Vanspeybrouck (BEL)	Topsport Vlaanderen–Baloise	+ 5"
5	Marco Marcato (ITA)	Wanty–Groupe Gobert	+ 6"
6	Alexander Edmondson (AUS)	Orica–GreenEDGE	+ 7"
7	Alexander Krieger (GER)	Leopard Pro Cycling	+ 7"
8	Caleb Ewan (AUS)	Orica–GreenEDGE	+ 9"
9	Alex Kirsch (LUX)	Stölting Service Group	+ 10"
10	Amaury Capiot (BEL)	Topsport Vlaanderen–Baloise	+ 10"
Source: ProCyclingStats

=== Stage 2 ===
3 June 2016 – Rosport to Schifflange, 162.8 km (101.2 mi)

Result of stage 2
Rank	Rider	Team	Time
1	Philippe Gilbert (BEL)	BMC Racing Team	3h 55' 59"
2	Maurits Lammertink (NED)	Roompot–Oranje Peloton	s.t.
3	Alex Kirsch (LUX)	Stölting Service Group	s.t.
4	Romain Hardy (FRA)	Cofidis	+ 3"
5	Tosh Van der Sande (BEL)	Lotto–Soudal	+ 3"
6	Pieter Vanspeybrouck (BEL)	Topsport Vlaanderen–Baloise	+ 3"
7	Rasmus Guldhammer (DEN)	Stölting Service Group	+ 3"
8	Dion Smith (NZL)	ONE Pro Cycling	+ 6"
9	Sébastien Delfosse (BEL)	Wallonie-Bruxelles–Group Protect	+ 6"
10	Anthony Turgis (FRA)	Cofidis	+ 6"
Source: ProCyclingStats

General classification after stage 2
Rank	Rider	Team	Time
1	Maurits Lammertink (NED)	Roompot–Oranje Peloton	8h 13' 23"
2	Philippe Gilbert (BEL)	BMC Racing Team	+ 9"
3	Alex Kirsch (LUX)	Stölting Service Group	+ 9"
4	Pieter Vanspeybrouck (BEL)	Topsport Vlaanderen–Baloise	+ 11"
5	Alexander Edmondson (AUS)	Orica–GreenEDGE	+ 16"
6	Alexander Krieger (GER)	Leopard Pro Cycling	+ 16"
7	Marco Marcato (ITA)	Wanty–Groupe Gobert	+ 23"
8	Gaëtan Bille (BEL)	Wanty–Groupe Gobert	+ 23"
9	Huub Duyn (NED)	Roompot–Oranje Peloton	+ 24"
10	Anthony Turgis (FRA)	Cofidis	+ 26"
Source: ProCyclingStats

=== Stage 3 ===
4 June 2016 – Eschweiler to Differdange, 162.8 km (101.2 mi)

Result of stage 3
Rank	Rider	Team	Time
1	Anthony Turgis (FRA)	Cofidis	3h 57' 12"
2	Christopher Juul-Jensen (DEN)	Orica–GreenEDGE	s.t.
3	Mathias Frank (SUI)	IAM Cycling	s.t.
4	Luis Ángel Maté (ESP)	Cofidis	s.t.
5	Dion Smith (NZL)	ONE Pro Cycling	+ 12"
6	Alexander Edmondson (AUS)	Orica–GreenEDGE	+ 12"
7	Philippe Gilbert (BEL)	BMC Racing Team	+ 12"
8	Tosh Van der Sande (BEL)	Lotto–Soudal	+ 12"
9	Rasmus Guldhammer (DEN)	Stölting Service Group	+ 12"
10	Pieter Vanspeybrouck (BEL)	Topsport Vlaanderen–Baloise	+ 12"
Source: ProCyclingStats

General classification after stage 3
Rank	Rider	Team	Time
1	Maurits Lammertink (NED)	Roompot–Oranje Peloton	12h 10' 44"
2	Anthony Turgis (FRA)	Cofidis	+ 7"
3	Philippe Gilbert (BEL)	BMC Racing Team	+ 12"
4	Alex Kirsch (LUX)	Stölting Service Group	+ 12"
5	Christopher Juul-Jensen (DEN)	Orica–GreenEDGE	+ 13"
6	Pieter Vanspeybrouck (BEL)	Topsport Vlaanderen–Baloise	+ 13"
7	Alexander Edmondson (AUS)	Orica–GreenEDGE	+ 19"
8	Marco Marcato (ITA)	Wanty–Groupe Gobert	+ 24"
9	Gaëtan Bille (BEL)	Wanty–Groupe Gobert	+ 26"
10	Huub Duyn (NED)	Roompot–Oranje Peloton	+ 27"
Source: ProCyclingStats

=== Stage 4 ===
4 June 2016 – Mersch to Luxembourg, 178.2 km (110.7 mi)

Result of stage 4
Rank	Rider	Team	Time
1	Philippe Gilbert (BEL)	BMC Racing Team	4h 17' 44"
2	Maurits Lammertink (NED)	Roompot–Oranje Peloton	s.t.
3	Dylan Teuns (BEL)	BMC Racing Team	+ 1"
4	Marco Marcato (ITA)	Wanty–Groupe Gobert	+ 1"
5	Huub Duyn (NED)	Roompot–Oranje Peloton	+ 3"
6	Alex Kirsch (LUX)	Stölting Service Group	+ 3"
7	Dion Smith (AUS)	ONE Pro Cycling	+ 3"
8	Christopher Juul-Jensen (DEN)	Orica–GreenEDGE	+ 6"
9	Tosh van der Sande (BEL)	Lotto–Soudal	+ 8"
10	Pieter Vanspeybrouck (BEL)	Topsport Vlaanderen–Baloise	+ 8"
Source: ProCyclingStats

General classification after stage 4
Rank	Rider	Team	Time
1	Maurits Lammertink (NED)	Roompot–Oranje Peloton	16h 28' 21"
2	Philippe Gilbert (BEL)	BMC Racing Team	+ 9"
3	Alex Kirsch (LUX)	Stölting Service Group	+ 19"
4	Anthony Turgis (FRA)	Cofidis	+ 22"
5	Christopher Juul-Jensen (DEN)	Orica–GreenEDGE	+ 24"
6	Pieter Vanspeybrouck (BEL)	Topsport Vlaanderen–Baloise	+ 28"
7	Marco Marcato (ITA)	Wanty–Groupe Gobert	+ 32"
8	Huub Duyn (NED)	Roompot–Oranje Peloton	+ 37"
9	Gaëtan Bille (BEL)	Wanty–Groupe Gobert	+ 48"
10	Nicolas Edet (FRA)	Cofidis	+ 52"
Source: ProCyclingStats

== Classification leadership ==
Stage	Winner	General classification	Points classification	Mountains classification	Young rider classification	Team classification
P	Jempy Drucker	Jempy Drucker	not awarded	not awarded	Maurits Lammertink	BMC Racing Team
1	André Greipel	Jempy Drucker	André Greipel	Thomas Deruette	Maurits Lammertink	BMC Racing Team
2	Philippe Gilbert	Maurits Lammertink	Philippe Gilbert	Thomas Deruette	Maurits Lammertink	Orica–GreenEDGE
3	Anthony Turgis	Maurits Lammertink	Philippe Gilbert	Brice Feillu	Maurits Lammertink	Cofidis
4	Philippe Gilbert	Maurits Lammertink	Philippe Gilbert	Brice Feillu	Maurits Lammertink	Cofidis
Final		Maurits Lammertink	Philippe Gilbert	Brice Feillu	Maurits Lammertink	Cofidis
