= Freienstein (surname) =

Freienstein is a German language habitational surname. Notable people with the name include:

- Raphael Freienstein (1991), German former cyclist
- Thomas Freienstein (1960), German former cyclist
