= 2016 Eschborn–Frankfurt – Rund um den Finanzplatz =

2016 Eschborn-Frankfurt – Rund um den Finanzplatz
2016 UCI Europe Tour

Race details
- Dates: 1 May 2016
- Stages: 1
- Distance: 206.8 km (128.5 mi)
- Winning time: 5h 00' 02"

Results
	Winner	Alexander Kristoff (NOR)	(Team Katusha)
	Second	Maximiliano Richeze (ARG)	(Etixx–Quick-Step)
	Third	Sam Bennett (IRL)	(Bora–Argon 18)

The 2016 Eschborn-Frankfurt – Rund um den Finanzplatz was the 54th edition of the Eschborn-Frankfurt – Rund um den Finanzplatz, a semi-classic cycling race in Germany. It was held, as customary on Tag der Arbeit (English: Labour Day), 1 May. The race started in Eschborn and finished in Frankfurt, covering a total distance of 206.8 kilometres (128.5 mi), and was a part of the 2016 UCI Europe Tour.

The race was won by Norwegian classics specialist Alexander Kristoff for Team Katusha, in a bunch sprint ahead of Maximiliano Richeze (Etixx–Quick-Step) and Bora–Argon 18's Sam Bennett.

== Teams ==
Twenty-three teams were invited to take part in the race. These included four UCI WorldTeams, eleven UCI Professional Continental teams and eight UCI Continental teams.

UCI WorldTeams

- AG2R La Mondiale
- Etixx–Quick-Step
- Team Giant–Alpecin
- Team Katusha

UCI Professional Continental Teams

- Bora–Argon 18
- CCC–Sprandi–Polkowice
- Delko–Marseille Provence KTM
- Fortuneo–Vital Concept
- Nippo–Vini Fantini
- Roompot–Oranje Peloton
- Stölting Service Group
- Topsport Vlaanderen–Baloise
- Verva ActiveJet
- Wanty–Groupe Gobert
- Southeast–Venezuela

UCI Continental Teams

- Crelan–Vastgoedservice
- Team Heizomat
- Team Kuota–Lotto
- Leopard Pro Cycling
- LKT Team Brandenburg
- Rad-Net Rose Team
- Team Sauerland NRW p/b Henley & Partners
- Stradalli–Bike Aid

== Result ==
Result
Rank	Rider	Team	Time
1	Alexander Kristoff (NOR)	Team Katusha	5h 00' 02"
2	Maximiliano Richeze (ARG)	Etixx–Quick-Step	+ 0"
3	Sam Bennett (IRL)	Bora–Argon 18	+ 0"
4	Pieter Vanspeybrouck (BEL)	Topsport Vlaanderen–Baloise	+ 0"
5	Yves Lampaert (BEL)	Etixx–Quick-Step	+ 0"
6	Tom Devriendt (BEL)	Wanty–Groupe Gobert	+ 0"
7	Paweł Franczak (POL)	Verva ActiveJet	+ 0"
8	Maurits Lammertink (NED)	Roompot–Oranje Peloton	+ 0"
9	Bartłomiej Matysiak (POL)	CCC–Sprandi–Polkowice	+ 0"
10	Fabian Wegmann (GER)	Stölting Service Group	+ 0"
