= Stade Géitz =

Former football stadium in Wiltz, Luxembourg

Coordinates: 49.9674°N 5.9274°E

Stade Géitz was a football stadium in Wiltz, in north-western Luxembourg. It used to be the home stadium of FC Wiltz 71, before they moved into the Stade Am Pëtz in nearby Weidingen. The stadium had a capacity of 2,000.
