= Guy de Muyser =

Luxembourgish jurist and diplomat (1926–2024)

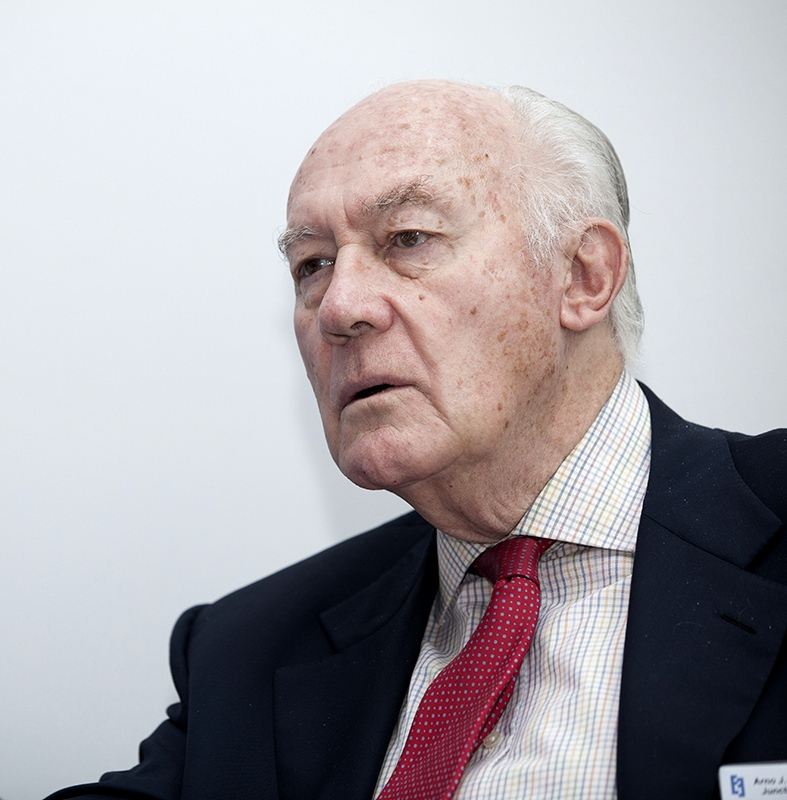
De Muyser in 2013

Guy de Muyser (20 June 1926 – 19 August 2024) was a Luxembourgish diplomat, economist and lawyer who also served as honorary marshal of the court of the Grand Duke of Luxembourg.

== Early life and education ==
Born in Wiltz in north-western Luxembourg, de Muyser studied economics, international relations and law in France, the United Kingdom and the United States of America, obtaining a doctorate in law. He was later awarded an honorary doctorate from Miami University in Ohio.

He was conscripted into the army in 1944 during the German occupation of Luxembourg, but deserted shortly afterwards, seeking refuge with American troops.

== Career ==
De Muyser held various roles at the Ministry of Foreign Affairs from 1956 onwards. From 1969 to 1981 he worked in the private office of Jean, Grand Duke of Luxembourg, and was marshal of the grand ducal court from 1971 to 1981.

From 1981 to 1986 he was stationed in Moscow as ambassador to the USSR, Poland, Finland and Mongolia, and from 1986 to 1991 in Brussels as Luxembourg's permanent representative to NATO.

De Muyser also served as president of Neimënster Abbey in Luxembourg.

== Family ==
In 1956 de Muyser married Dominique Milliat (1930–2015), with whom he had three children: Isabelle, Xavier and Alain.
