= Huub Duyn =

Dutch racing cyclist

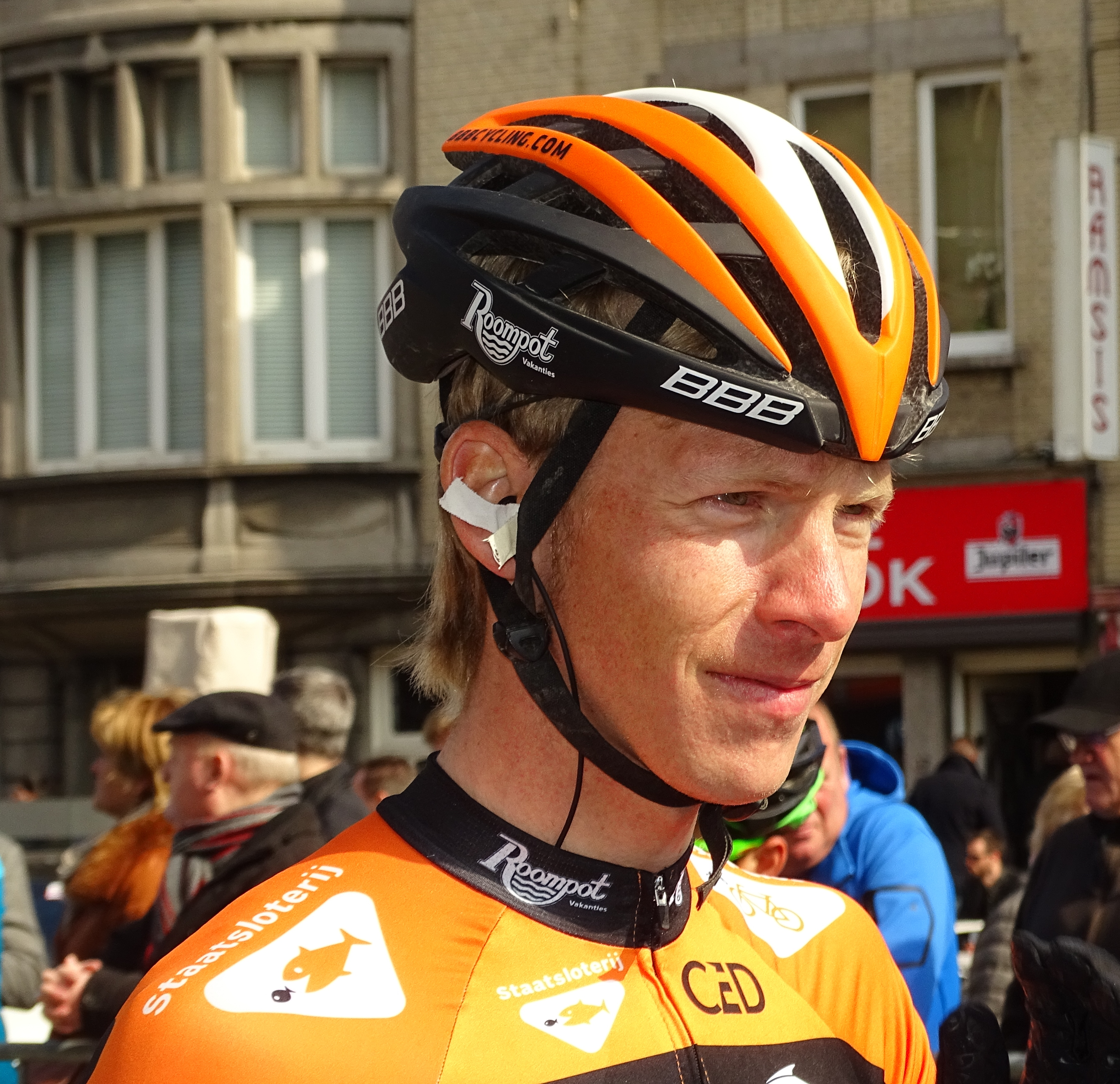
- Duyn in 2016.

Personal information
- Full name: Hubertus Martinus Duyn
- Nickname: Huub
- Born: 1 September 1984 (age 42) Onderdijk, the Netherlands
- Height: 1.84 m (6 ft 0 in)
- Weight: 73 kg (161 lb)

Cycling career
- Sport: Cycling
- Current team: Team Picnic–PostNL (women)
- Discipline: Road
- Role: Rider (retired); Directeur sportif

Amateur teams
- 2003: Cycling Team Bert Story–Piels
- 2004: Palmans–Collstrop
- 2005: Team Moser–AH–Trentino

Professional teams
- 2006: Rabobank Continental Team
- 2007–2009: Slipstream–Chipotle
- 2010: Team NetApp
- 2011: Donckers Koffie–Jelly Belly
- 2012–2014: Cycling Team De Rijke
- 2015–2016: Team Roompot
- 2017–2018: Vérandas Willems–Crelan
- 2019: Roompot–Charles

Managerial teams
- 2020–2021: NXTG Racing
- 2021–: Team DSM (women)
- 2021: Development Team DSM

Hubertus Martinus "Huub" Duyn (Dutch: Hubertus Martinus Duijn; born 1 September 1984 in Onderdijk, North Holland) is a Dutch former racing cyclist, who rode professionally between 2006 and 2019 for the Rabobank Continental Team, Garmin–Slipstream, Team NetApp, Donckers Koffie–Jelly Belly, Cyclingteam de Rijke, Vérandas Willems–Crelan and Roompot–Charles teams. His best result in his career was winning the Paris–Tours Espoirs in 2006. He currently works as a directeur sportif for UCI Women's WorldTeam Team Picnic–PostNL.

== Major results ==
2006
1st Paris–Tours Espoirs
1st Stage 1 Ronde van Vlaams-Brabant
2nd Memorial Van Coningsloo
3rd Overall Le Triptyque des Monts et Châteaux

1st Stage 1

3rd Overall Triptyque des Barrages

1st Stage 1

3rd Grand Prix de Waregem
2007
6th Overall Tour du Poitou-Charentes
2009
1st Stage 1 (TTT) Tour of Qatar
2010
4th Ronde Pévéloise
5th Halle–Ingooigem
2011
1st Stage 8 Crocodile Trophy (MTB)
2nd Omloop Het Nieuwsblad Espoirs
2nd Dwars door het Hageland
4th Grote 1-MeiPrijs
8th Internationale Wielertrofee Jong Maar Moedig
9th Circuit de Wallonie
10th Halle–Ingooigem
2012
2nd Overall Ronde van Overijssel
5th Grote Prijs Jef Scherens
6th Grand Prix Criquielion
7th Dwars door het Hageland
10th Zellik–Galmaarden
2013
1st Prologue (TTT) Volta a Portugal
3rd Ronde van Limburg
4th Grote Prijs Stad Geel
6th Ringerike GP
9th Overall Circuit des Ardennes
2014
4th Arno Wallaard Memorial
5th Overall Flèche du Sud
5th Overall Tour Alsace
6th Grote Prijs Stad Zottegem
7th Overall Tour de Normandie
2015
3rd Overall Tour de Luxembourg
7th Grote Prijs Jef Scherens
9th Overall Tour de Yorkshire
9th Overall Tour of Belgium
10th Druivenkoers Overijse
2016
2nd Druivenkoers Overijse
4th Grand Prix de Wallonie
6th Volta Limburg Classic
8th Overall Tour de Luxembourg
10th Overall Tour des Fjords
2017
1st Rad am Ring
2nd Omloop Mandel-Leie-Schelde
5th Overall Tour de Luxembourg
5th Druivenkoers Overijse
2018
2nd Primus Classic
6th Grand Prix de Wallonie
7th Overall Tour de Luxembourg
8th Brabantse Pijl
8th Grote Prijs Stad Zottegem
2019
9th Druivenkoers Overijse
