= Anthony Perez (cyclist) =

French cyclist

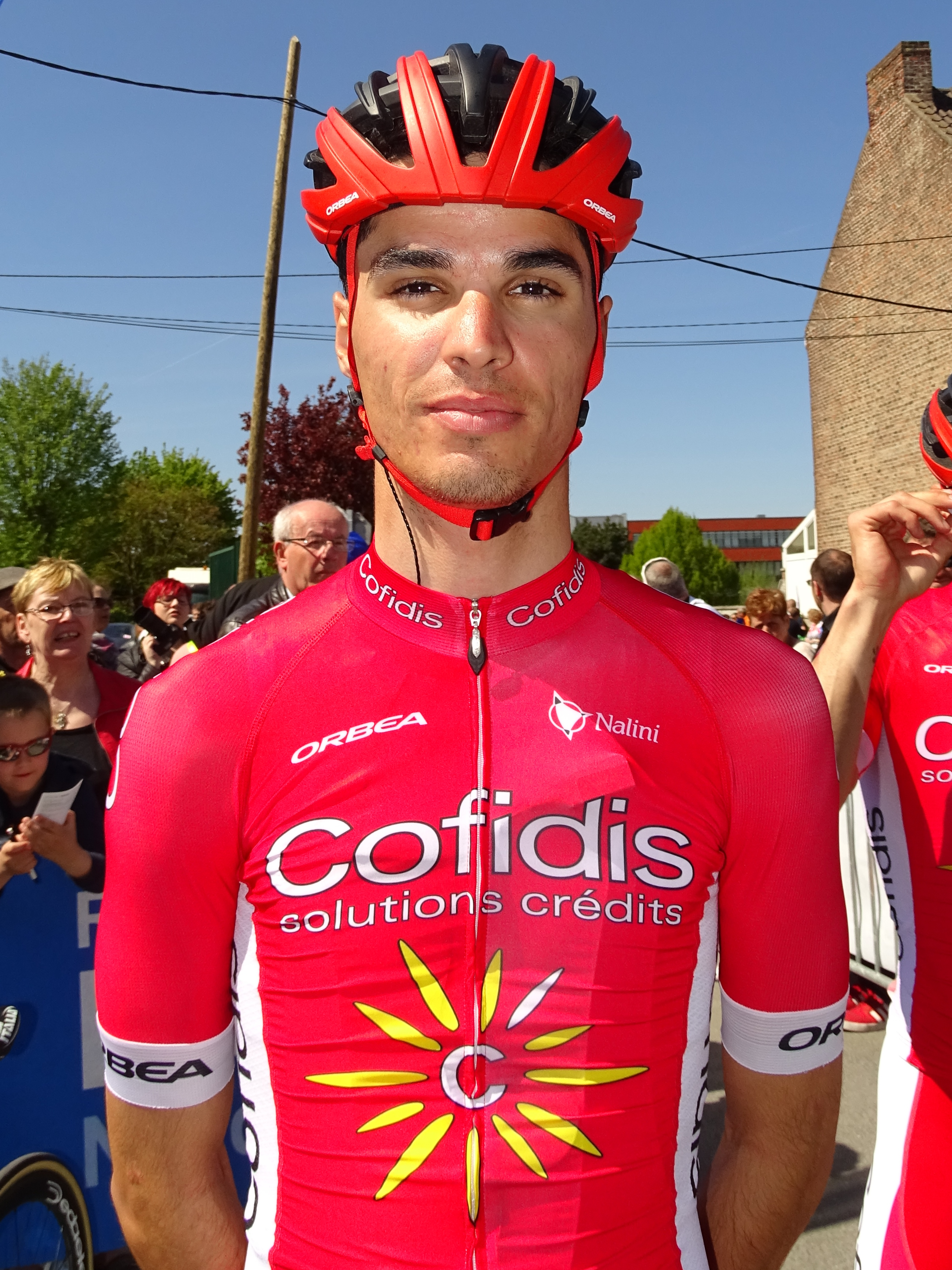
- Perez in 2016

Personal information
- Full name: Anthony Perez
- Born: 22 April 1991 (age 35) Toulouse, France
- Height: 1.90 m (6 ft 3 in)
- Weight: 70 kg (154 lb; 11 st 0 lb)

Cycling career
- Sport: Cycling
- Current team: Cofidis
- Discipline: Road
- Role: Rider (retired)

Amateur teams
- 2010: Albi VS
- 2011: GSC Blagnac
- 2011: La Pomme Marseille (stagiaire)
- 2012–2015: AVC Aix-en-Provence

Professional team
- 2016–2025: Cofidis

Major wins
- One-day races and Classics La Drôme Classic (2023)

Anthony Perez (born 22 April 1991) is a French retired professional cyclist, who spent his entire professional career riding for UCI WorldTeam Cofidis. He was named in the startlist for the 2017 Vuelta a España. In July 2018, he was named in the start list for the Tour de France.

== Major results ==
2012
5th Time trial, National Under-23 Road Championships
2013
4th Road race, Jeux de la Francophonie
2015
1st Sprints classification, Tour des Pays de Savoie
2017 (1 pro win)
Tour du Gévaudan Languedoc-Roussillon

1st Points classification
1st Stage 2

3rd Overall Tour de Luxembourg

1st Stage 3

2018 (1)
1st Mountains classification, Route d'Occitanie
7th Overall Tour de Yorkshire
9th Overall Tour de Luxembourg

1st Stage 4

10th Overall Tour de l'Ain
2019
2nd Duo Normand (with Christophe Laporte)
2020 (1)
1st Stage 1 Tour des Alpes-Maritimes et du Var
2021
1st Mountains classification, Paris–Nice
3rd Polynormande
4th Mercan'Tour Classic
Combativity award Stage 17 Tour de France
2022 (1)
1st Classic Loire Atlantique
5th Route Adélie
Combativity award Stage 4 Tour de France
2023 (1)
1st La Drôme Classic
2nd Cholet-Pays de la Loire
5th Overall Tour Poitou-Charentes en Nouvelle-Aquitaine
5th La Roue Tourangelle
9th Overall Étoile de Bessèges
9th Overall Tour des Alpes-Maritimes et du Var
2024
6th Classic Loire Atlantique

=== Grand Tour general classification results timeline ===
Grand Tour	2017	2018	2019	2020	2021	2022	2023	2024	2025
Giro d'Italia	—	—	—	—	—	88	—	—	124
Tour de France	—	85	87	DNF	86	84	DNF	—	—
Vuelta a España	80	—	—	—	—	—	—	—	—

Legend
—	Did not compete
DNF	Did not finish
IP	In progress
