= 2011 Crocodile Trophy =

Race details
- Dates: 18 – 27 October
- Stages: 10
- Distance: 1,211 km (752.5 mi)

Results
	Winner	Jeroen Boelen (NED)	(Milka-Trek)
	Second	Wolfgang Krenn (AUT)	
	Third	Josef Benedseder (AUT)	
	Points	Jeroen Boelen (NED)	(Milka-Trek)

The 2011 Crocodile Trophy was the 17th edition of the Crocodile trophy Mountain Bike stage race. The race was held from 18 October to 27 October. The race covered 1,211 kilometres (752 mi) divided over 10 stages.

Pre race favourites were the winner of last two events: Urs Huber, runner-up of the last two events and former olympic champion: Bart Brentjens and number three of the last two events: Mike Mulkens. Huber aimed to be the first rider in history to win the trophy three times in a row.

== Race Overview ==
Only two of the pre race favourites would eventually start the race. Bart Brentjens pulled out of the event before the first stage due to an illness. On the first day of the Trophy it started to rain in North Queensland. The organisation decided that it was not safe for the riders to race in the heavy rain and decided to neutralize the stage. One rider, Danish cyclist Jakob Steen-Petersen, broke his collarbone because took risks in a descent despite the neutralization of the stage.

The rain hadn't stopped but the race started on the second day. Swiss Marathon champion en defending champion Urs Huber took the stage with an advantage of 4 minutes to Brentjens' team-mate Jeroen Boelen to become the first race leader. During the third stage it became clear that Huber and Boelen would be the riders for the overall victory. Huber won the stage, but the gap to the Dutchman was much smaller than on stage two.

Boelen then took three consecutive stages, the first by winning the sprint of a four-man break away. Boelen outsprinted Huber on stage 5 for the second stage win. The Dutchman took both the stage and the leaders jersey on the next day. Huber punctured but also ran out of energy on the longest stage of the 2011 event, resulting in a loss of more than ten minutes to Boelen.

Huber managed to take a few seconds back on the seventh stage, a stage which was compared to Paris–Roubaix by former Austrian road race champion René Haselbacher: "Today was really like a Paris–Roubaix stage. Relatively flat but hard, and you just needed to keep on going." His fellow Austrian road race cyclist Christoph Sokoll won the seventh stage after his break-away companion Mike Mulkens punctured in the last kilometer. Dutch road race cyclist Huub Duyn claimed the eight stage while only riding the Crocodile Trophy for the fun.

Urs Huber withdrew from the race before the start of stage 9. Huber, second overall at that moment, got ill during the night between stage 8 and 9 and was not able to continue the event. Boelen won both the 9th and 10th stage and sealed the overall victory.

== Stages ==
Stage	Route	Distance	Date	Winner	Race Leader Men	Race Leader Women
1	Cairns - Lake Tinaroo	98 km	18 October	Stage Neutralized	Stage Neutralized	Stage Neutralized
2	Lake Tinaroo - Koombooloomba	106 km	19 October	(Switzerland) Urs Huber	(Switzerland) Urs Huber	(Australia) Jessica Douglas
3	Koombooloomba - Irvinebank	115 km	20 October	(Switzerland) Urs Huber	(Switzerland) Urs Huber	(Australia) Jessica Douglas
4	Gunnawarra Lagoon - Irvinebank	106 km	21 October	(Netherlands) Jeroen Boelen	(Switzerland) Urs Huber	(Australia) Jessica Douglas
5	Irvinebank - Mt. Mulligan	110 km	22 October	(Netherlands) Jeroen Boelen	(Switzerland) Urs Huber	(Australia) Jessica Douglas
6	Mt. Mulligan - Mt. Mulgrave	189 km	23 October	(Netherlands) Jeroen Boelen	(Netherlands) Jeroen Boelen	(Australia) Jessica Douglas
7	Mt. Mulgrave - Laura	151 km	24 October	(Austria) Christoph Sokoll	(Netherlands) Jeroen Boelen	(Australia) Jessica Douglas
8	Laura - Kalpowar	89 km	25 October	(Netherlands) Huub Duyn	(Netherlands) Jeroen Boelen	(Australia) Jessica Douglas
9	Kalpowar - Munburra	148 km	26 October	(Netherlands) Jeroen Boelen	(Netherlands) Jeroen Boelen	(Australia) Jessica Douglas
10	Munburra - Cooktown	99 km	27 October	(Netherlands) Jeroen Boelen	(Netherlands) Jeroen Boelen	(Australia) Jessica Douglas
