= Richard Brookins =

American WWII soldier

Richard W. Brookins
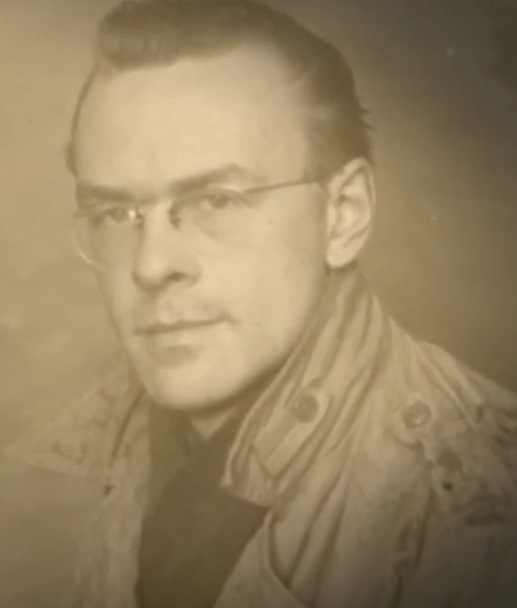
- Born: February 25, 1922; Rochester, New York, USA
- Died: October 11, 2018 (aged 96)
- Burial place: White Haven Memorial Park Pittsford, Monroe County, New York
- Military career
- Rank: Corporal
- Unit: 28th Infantry Division

Richard W. Brookins (February 25, 1922 – October 11, 2018) was an American man who, as a soldier during World War II, was chosen to portray Saint Nicholas for the children of Wiltz, Luxembourg. He then became known as "The American St. Nick" and came to represent all of the Americans who helped defend Luxembourg from German forces.

== Personal life ==
Brookins was born in Rochester, New York, on February 25, 1922, and returned there after the war. Before the war, he worked at Ritter Dental; after the war, he worked for Rochester Telephone.

== Background ==
In 1944, the village of Wiltz had been under German occupation for about four years; among the many negative effects of the occupation, they had been forbidden from holding their traditional Saint Nicholas Day celebrations. After landing at Normandy on June 6, 1944, Allied forces were pushing the Germans back, and American troops arrived in Wiltz in the fall. Members of the 28th Infantry Division decided to do what they could for the children of Wiltz and organized a holiday celebration to lift their spirits.

Corporal Harry Stutz came up with the idea of a Christmas party, sought permission up the chain of command, and was finally given approval by commanding General Norman Cota. Soldiers pooled their rations to provide candy and chocolate for the children. The Signal Company's cooks were asked to prepare cakes and donuts for the children. Stutz recruited his buddy Corporal Richard Brookins, a tall encryptionist and projectionist assigned to the 28th Signal Company Message Center, to portray St. Nicholas himself (Kleeschen in Luxembourgish).

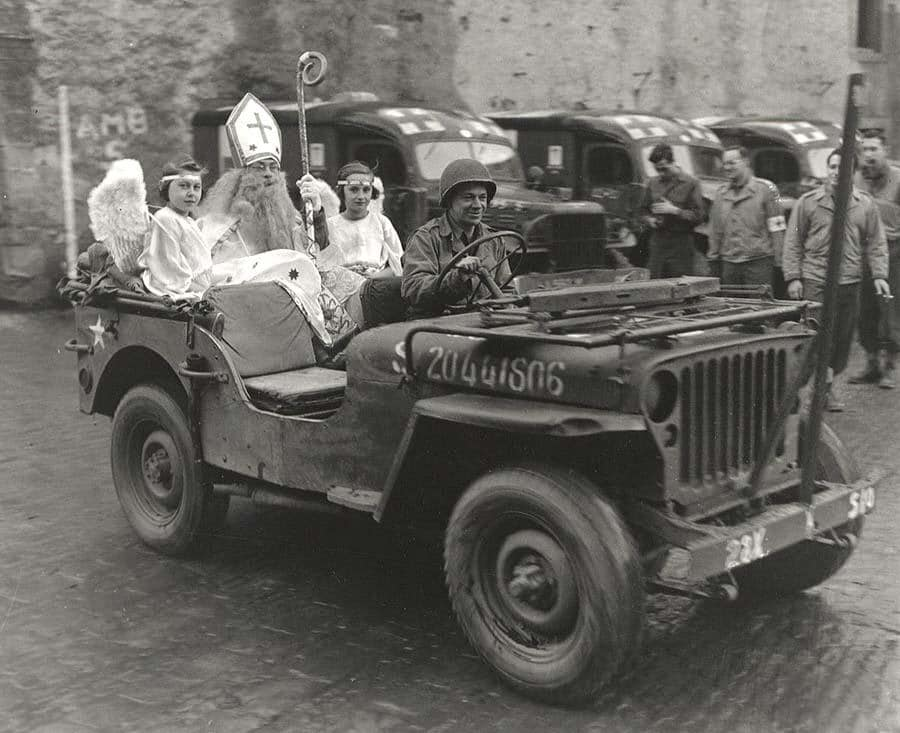
US Saint Nick with his little angels

On December 5, 1944, at the local church, the nuns helped Brookins put on his disguise making use of the local priest's vestments, a beard of rope, and a bishop's miter constructed by the nuns. "St. Nick" and two young girls dressed as angels were driven through town in a jeep, rather than the traditional carriage, and brought to the party at the local castle where St. Nick gave out candy to the children.

The role only lasted a few hours, and in less than two weeks the German forces had pushed back into Wiltz as part of the Battle of the Bulge. But the people of Wiltz did not forget what the Americans had done for them.

== After the war ==
In 1947, Wiltz reinstated their Saint Nicholas Day celebrations, but the goal was not just to honor St. Nicholas, but also to honor the "American St. Nick", as a representative of all of the American forces who had fought to liberate Luxembourg. His identity remained a mystery until 1977, when Brookins's fellow infantryman Frank McClelland tracked him down and delivered a handwritten message from the people of Wiltz inviting him back to town. Brookins had had no idea his brief role had been remembered after all that time.

Brookins returned to Wiltz six times, the last in 2014. He was granted honorary citizenship of Wiltz, and in 2009 they erected a monument in his honor. In 2016, the government of Luxembourg awarded him the Luxembourg Military Honor Medal.
