= Pieter Vanspeybrouck =

Belgian road bicycle racer

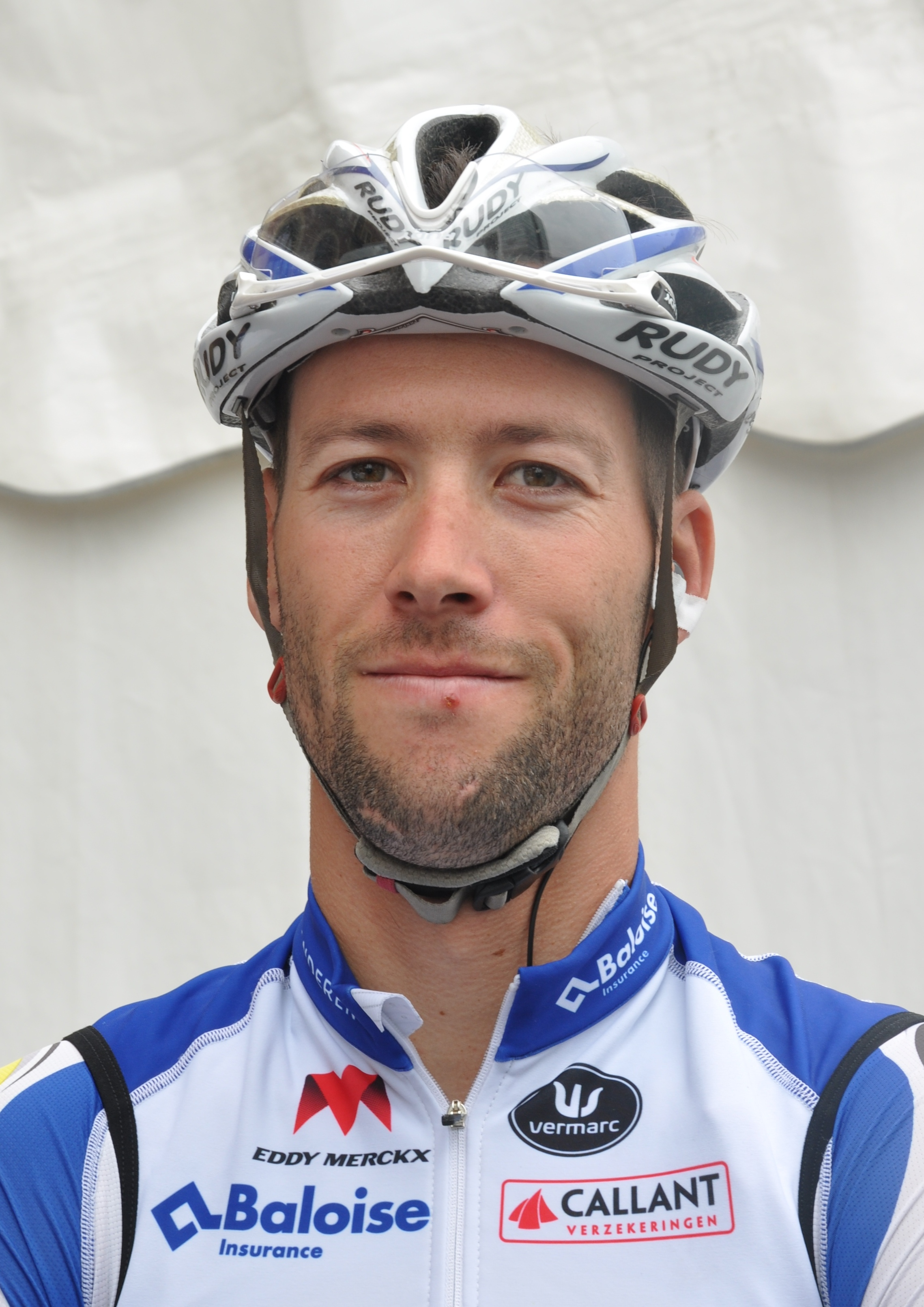
- Vanspeybrouck in 2016.

Personal information
- Full name: Pieter Vanspeybrouck
- Born: 10 February 1987 (age 39) Tielt, Belgium

Cycling career
- Sport: Cycling
- Current team: Intermarché–Wanty
- Discipline: Road
- Role: Rider (retired); Directeur sportif

Amateur teams
- 2005: Avia Waasland
- 2006–2007: Beveren 2000

Professional teams
- 2008–2016: Topsport Vlaanderen
- 2017–2021: Wanty–Groupe Gobert

Managerial team
- 2022–: Intermarché–Wanty–Gobert Matériaux

Pieter Vanspeybrouck (born 10 February 1987 in Tielt) is a Belgian former professional road bicycle racer, who now works as a directeur sportif for UCI WorldTeam Intermarché–Wanty.

In June 2017, he was named in the startlist for the Tour de France.

== Major results ==
2006
3rd Road race, National Under-23 Road Championships
3rd Paris–Roubaix Espoirs
2007
3rd Kattekoers
3rd Circuit de Wallonie
5th De Vlaamse Pijl
10th Ronde van Vlaanderen Beloften
10th Vlaamse Havenpijl
2008
3rd De Vlaamse Pijl
2009
9th GP Triberg-Schwarzwald
10th Sparkassen Giro Bochum
2010
6th Dutch Food Valley Classic
7th Ronde van het Groene Hart
2011
1st Sparkassen Giro Bochum
5th Road race, National Road Championships
6th Halle–Ingooigem
2012
7th Nokere Koerse
2013
4th Grote Prijs Stad Zottegem
7th Châteauroux Classic
10th Grand Prix d'Ouverture La Marseillaise
2014
5th De Kustpijl
2015
10th Halle–Ingooigem
2016
1st Omloop Mandel-Leie-Schelde
4th Eschborn–Frankfurt – Rund um den Finanzplatz
6th Overall Tour de Luxembourg
6th Dorpenomloop Rucphen
6th Classic Loire Atlantique
6th Brussels Cycling Classic
7th Overall Tour of Belgium
7th Cholet-Pays de Loire
9th Rund um Köln
2018
10th Vuelta a Murcia
10th Grand Prix Criquielion
2019
10th Clásica de Almería

=== Grand Tour general classification results timeline ===
Grand Tour	2017
Giro d'Italia	—
Tour de France	100
Vuelta a España	—

Legend
—	Did not compete
DNF	Did not finish
