= 2012 Grote Prijs Jef Scherens =

Race details
- Dates: 2 September 2012
- Stages: 1
- Distance: 183.3 km (113.9 mi)
- Winning time: 4h 13' 27"

Results
	Winner	Steven Caethoven (BEL)
	Second	Stijn Neirynck (BEL)
	Third	Frédéric Amorison (BEL)

The 2012 Grote Prijs Jef Scherens was the 46th edition of the Grote Prijs Jef Scherens cycle race and was held on 2 September 2012. The race started and finished in Leuven. The race was won by Steven Caethoven.

== General classification ==
Final general classification

Rank	Rider	Time
1	Steven Caethoven (BEL)	4h 13' 27"
2	Stijn Neirynck (BEL)	+ 0"
3	Frédéric Amorison (BEL)	+ 0"
4	Björn Leukemans (BEL)	+ 0"
5	Huub Duyn (NED)	+ 0"
6	Dries Devenyns (BEL)	+ 0"
7	Jelle Wallays (BEL)	+ 3"
8	Damien Gaudin (FRA)	+ 9"
9	Matteo Trentin (ITA)	+ 13"
10	Jelle Vanendert (BEL)	+ 13"
