= Wiltz Castle =

Castle in Wiltz, Luxembourg

Coordinates: 49°57′59″N 5°56′14″E

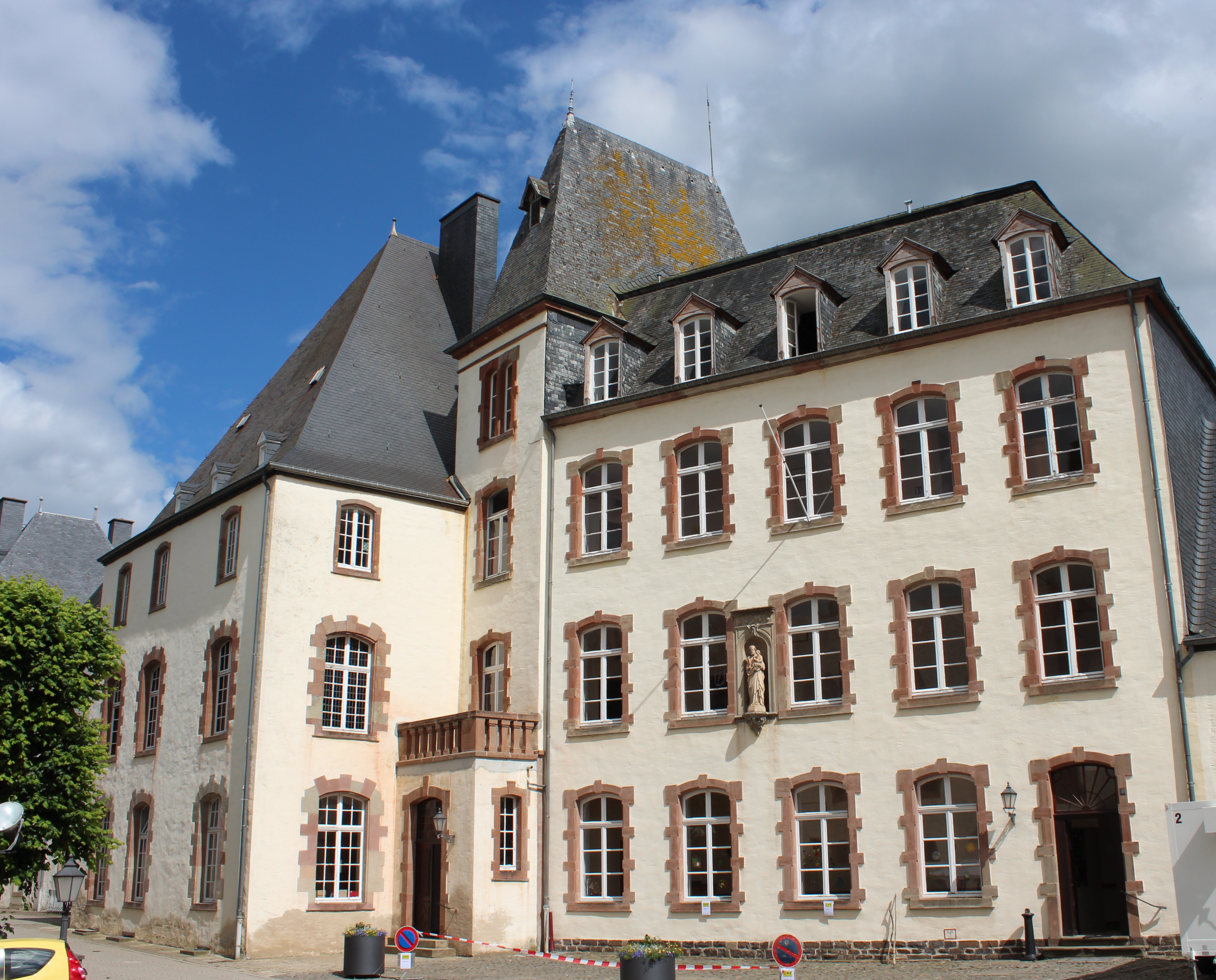
Wiltz castle

Wiltz Castle (French: Château de Wiltz, German: Schloss Wiltz Luxembourgish: Schlass Wolz), located in Wiltz in the north of Luxembourg, dates back to 1573.

It is now known above all for hosting an annual music festival. Part of the castle now serves as the campus of European Business Institute, United Business Institutes and of Brookins Business Institute Academy for Applied Science.

== History ==
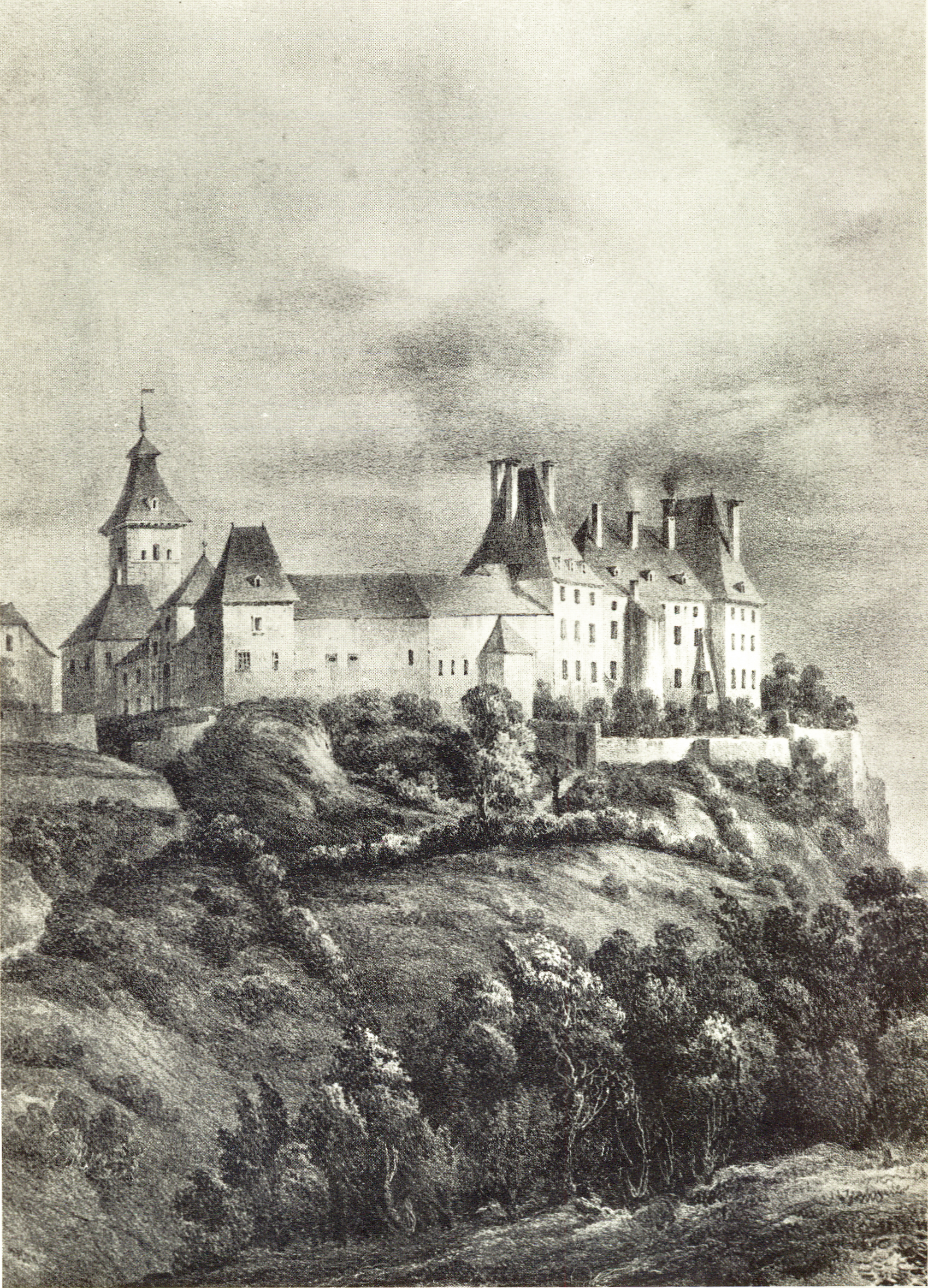
Wiltz Castle: historical drawing by Nicolas Liez (1834)

In the 13th century, the Lords of Wiltz built a fortified castle on a rocky promontory, initiating the development of the upper town of Wiltz. In 1388, the French attacked the town and burnt the castle down but it was soon repaired. In 1453, Wiltz was again attacked, this time by the troops of Philip of Burgundy. The round Witches' Tower to the east of the gardens is the oldest part of today's castle. Under Count John VI of Wiltz, the construction of today's Renaissiance style castle was begun in 1631. After delays caused by the Thirty Years War, the main building was not completed until about 1720. The old chapel was finished in 1722 and the monumental staircase leading down to the gardens was completed in 1727. The castle premises were acquired by the State of Luxembourg in 1951 for use as an old people's home.

== The music festival ==
Since 1953, Wiltz Castle has been the venue of an international music festival attracting artists and orchestras of international repute. Not only classical music but also jazz and rock is included in the festival which runs for three weeks from late June to mid-July. In 1991, a removable roof was installed, covering most of the stage and sheltering the hundreds of spectators who would otherwise have been bothered by bad weather.

== Brewing and tanning museums ==
Since 1999, the castle's stables have housed the National Museum of Brewing (Musée National d'Art Brassicole). The museum traces the history of beer production over the past 6,000 years, especially more recent developments in Luxembourg. It is open on weekdays from 9 am to noon and from 2 pm to 5 pm and on Saturdays from 10 am to noon, except in July and August when it is open every day from 10 am to 6 pm.

The little tanning museum (Musée de la Tannerie) presents the history of the leather industry in Wiltz which dates from 1644. In 1887, the town had 28 tanneries. The two largest producers closed in 1953 and 1961.

== See also ==
- List of castles in Luxembourg
- List of museums in Luxembourg
