= Weidingen =

Village in Luxembourg

Coordinates: 49°58′N 5°57′E

Weidingen (German pronunciation: [ˈvaɪdɪŋən]; Luxembourgish: Wegdichen) is a village in the commune of Wiltz, in north-western Luxembourg. It is believed to be the only village in Luxembourg without a church. As of September 2026, the village has a population of 877.

It is the location of the FC Wiltz 71 football stadium, Stade Am Pëtz, since they moved there from the now demolished Stade Géitz.
