= 2010 Crocodile Trophy =

Race details
- Dates: 18 – 28 October
- Stages: 10
- Distance: 1,162 km (722.0 mi)

Results
	Winner	Urs Huber (SUI)	
	Second	Bart Brentjens (NED)	(Trek Brentjens)
	Third	Mike Mulkens (BEL)	
	Points	Bart Brentjens (NED)	(Trek Brentjens)

The 2010 Crocodile Trophy was the 16th edition of the Crocodile trophy Mountain Bike stage race. The race was held from 19 October to 28 October. The race covered 1,162 kilometres (722 mi) divided over 10 stages.

The favourites for the overall victory all finished on the podium in the 2009 edition: Urs Huber, Bart Brentjens and Mike Mulkens. The three cyclist would finish in the same order on the podium of the 2010 edition. Among the competitors was also Jaan Kirsipuu, a former Tour de France yellow jersey wearer and multiple stage winner. Kirispuu would eventually win the general classification in the M2 class.

== Race overview ==
Stage 6 was neutralized due to the death of Dutch cyclist Weit Heuker. The 59-year-old died during the night of October 23–24. Out of respect the stage was neutralized and no changes were made in the general classification.

== Stages ==
Stage	Route	Distance	Date	Winner	Race Leader Men	Race Leader Women
1	Cairns - Lake Tinaroo	98 km	19 October	(Switzerland) Urs Huber	(Switzerland) Urs Huber	(Australia) Abby McLennan
2	Lake Tinaroo - Granite Gorge	71 km	20 October	(Netherlands) Bart Brentjens	(Switzerland) Urs Huber	(Australia) Abby McLennan
3	Granite Gorge - Irvinebank	144 km	21 October	(Netherlands) Bart Brentjens	(Switzerland) Urs Huber	(Australia) Abby McLennan
4	Irvinebank - Chillagoe	157 km	22 October	(Estonia) Jaan Kirsipuu	(Switzerland) Urs Huber	(Australia) Abby McLennan
5	Chillagoe	100 km	23 October	(Austria) Christoph Tschellnig	(Switzerland) Urs Huber	(Australia) Abby McLennan
6	Chillagoe - Mt. Mulgrave	137 km	24 October	Stage neutralized	(Switzerland) Urs Huber	(Australia) Abby McLennan
7	Mt. Mulgrave - Laura	151 km	25 October	(Netherlands) Bart Brentjens	(Switzerland) Urs Huber	(Australia) Abby McLennan
8	Laura - Cooktown	142 km	26 October	(Estonia) Allan Oras	(Switzerland) Urs Huber	(Australia) Abby McLennan
9	Cooktown - Ayton	124 km	27 October	(Austria) Philipp Ludescher	(Switzerland) Urs Huber	(Australia) Abby McLennan
10	Ayton - Cape Tribulation	38 km	28 October	(Switzerland) Urs Huber	(Switzerland) Urs Huber	(Australia) Abby McLennan
