= Elodie Kuijper =

Dutch cyclist (born 2000)

Personal information
- Born: 2 March 2000 (age 26)

Cycling career
- Sport: Cycling
- Discipline: Road
- Role: Rider

Professional team
- 2019: Health Mate–Cyclelive Team

Elodie Kuijper (born 2 March 2000) is a Dutch professional racing cyclist, who rode for the UCI Women's Team Health Mate–Cyclelive Team. In May 2019, she signed with Health Mate–Cyclelive Team for the 2019 women's road cycling season.
