= Maurits Lammertink =

Dutch cyclist (born 1990)

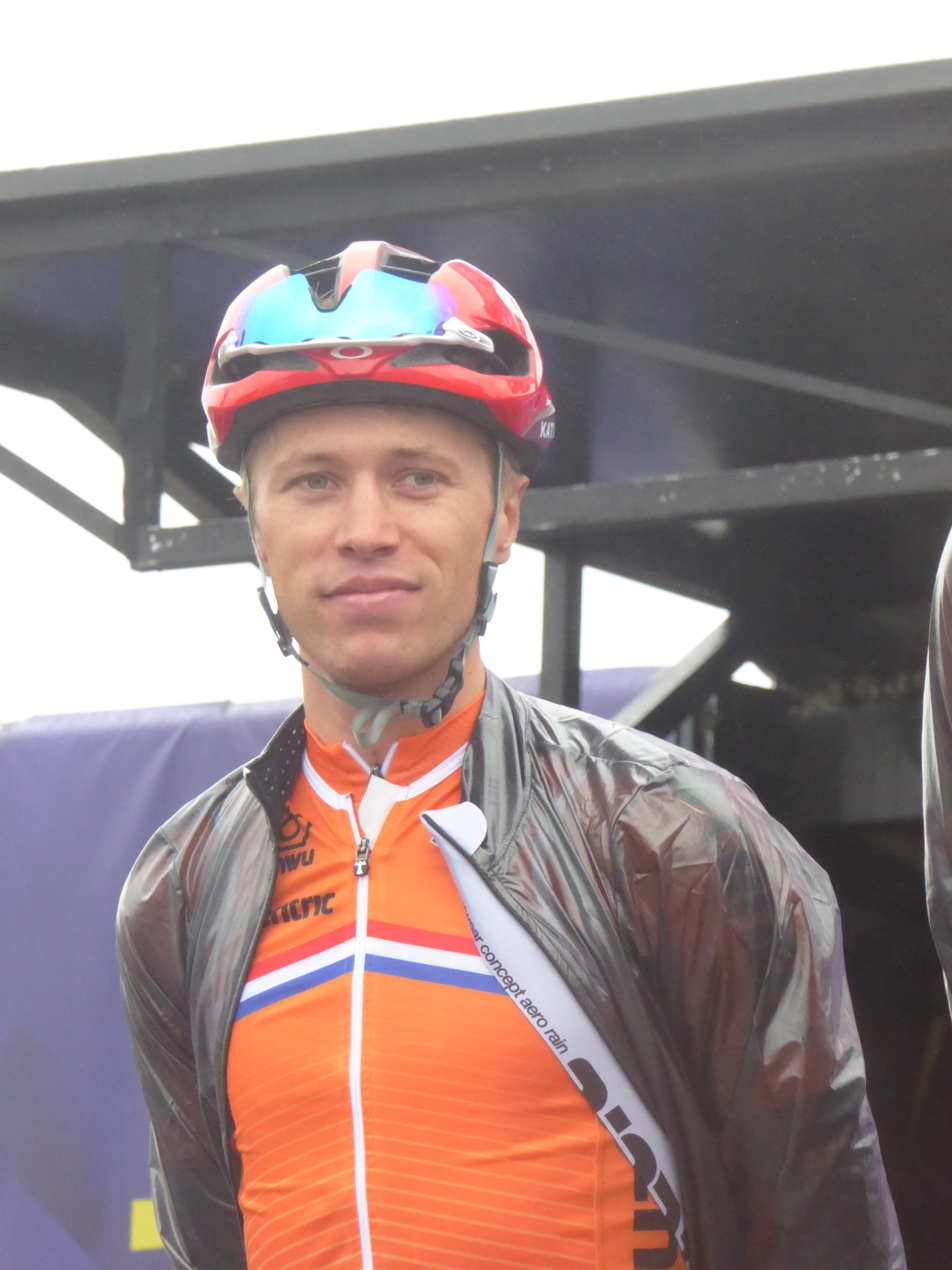
- Lammertink at the 2018 European Road Cycling Championships

Personal information
- Full name: Maurits Lammertink
- Born: 31 August 1990 (age 36) Enter, Netherlands
- Height: 1.70 m (5 ft 7 in)
- Weight: 59 kg (130 lb)

Cycling career
- Sport: Cycling
- Disciplines: Cyclo-cross; Road
- Role: Rider

Amateur team
- 2009: Asito-Craft Cycling Team

Professional teams
- 2011–2012: Cycling Team Jo Piels
- 2012–2013: Vacansoleil–DCM
- 2014: Cycling Team Jo Piels
- 2015–2016: Team Roompot
- 2017–2018: Team Katusha–Alpecin
- 2019: Roompot–Charles
- 2020–2021: Circus–Wanty Gobert (road)
- 2020–2021: Tormans (cyclo-cross)

Major wins
- Stage races Tour de Luxembourg (2016)

Maurits Lammertink (born 31 August 1990) is a Dutch former cyclist, who rode professionally in road bicycle racing and cyclo-cross between 2011 and 2021. During his professional career, Lammertink took three victories – he won a stage of the 2015 Tour du Limousin, the general classification of the 2016 Tour de Luxembourg, and a stage of the 2017 Tour of Belgium. He also contested four Grand Tours between 2013 and 2018.

In June 2021, Lammertink was struck by a scooter while with family members near his home in Hengelo, suffering a brain haemorrhage and multiple other injuries. When interviewed by Algemeen Dagblad in 2024, Lammertink stated that he had been left with permanent brain damage as a result of the incident.

== Personal life ==
His younger brother Steven Lammertink also competed professionally as a cyclist, until retiring in 2019.

== Major results ==
2011
1st Stage 4 Czech Cycling Tour
2nd Road race, National Under-23 Road Championships
3rd Eschborn-Frankfurt City Loop U23
9th Arno Wallaard Memorial
2012
1st Overall Carpathia Couriers Path

1st Points classification
1st Stage 1

1st Mountains classification Oberösterreich Rundfahrt
3rd Eschborn-Frankfurt City Loop U23
7th Rund um Köln
2013
5th Overall Ster ZLM Toer
8th Eschborn-Frankfurt – Rund um den Finanzplatz
9th Ronde van Drenthe
2014
1st Circuit de Wallonie
3rd Overall Dookoła Mazowsza

1st Points classification
1st Stage 5

3rd Ronde van Overijssel
4th Rabo Baronie Breda Classic
5th Overall Czech Cycling Tour

1st Stage 4

9th Grand Prix des Marbriers
2015
2nd Coppa Sabatini
4th Druivenkoers Overijse
5th Overall Tour du Limousin

1st Stage 4

8th Brabantse Pijl
8th Gran Premio Bruno Beghelli
2016
1st Overall Tour de Luxembourg

1st Young rider classification

7th Brabantse Pijl
8th Eschborn–Frankfurt – Rund um den Finanzplatz
2017
6th Overall Tour of Belgium

1st Stage 4

6th Overall Tour de Yorkshire
2018
8th Cadel Evans Great Ocean Road Race
10th Road race, UEC European Road Championships
2019
2nd Overall Tour de Luxembourg
6th Overall ZLM Tour
8th Famenne Ardenne Classic
10th Brabantse Pijl
2020
2nd Paris–Camembert
6th Giro dell'Appennino
9th Paris–Tours
2021
9th Trofeo Calvia

=== Grand Tour general classification results timeline ===
Grand Tour	2013	2014	2015	2016	2017	2018
Giro d'Italia	154	—	—	—	—	41
Tour de France	—	—	—	—	75	—
Vuelta a España	—	—	—	—	—	DNF

Legend
—	Did not compete
DNF	Did not finish
