= Eschweiler, Wiltz =

Eschweiler
- Former commune
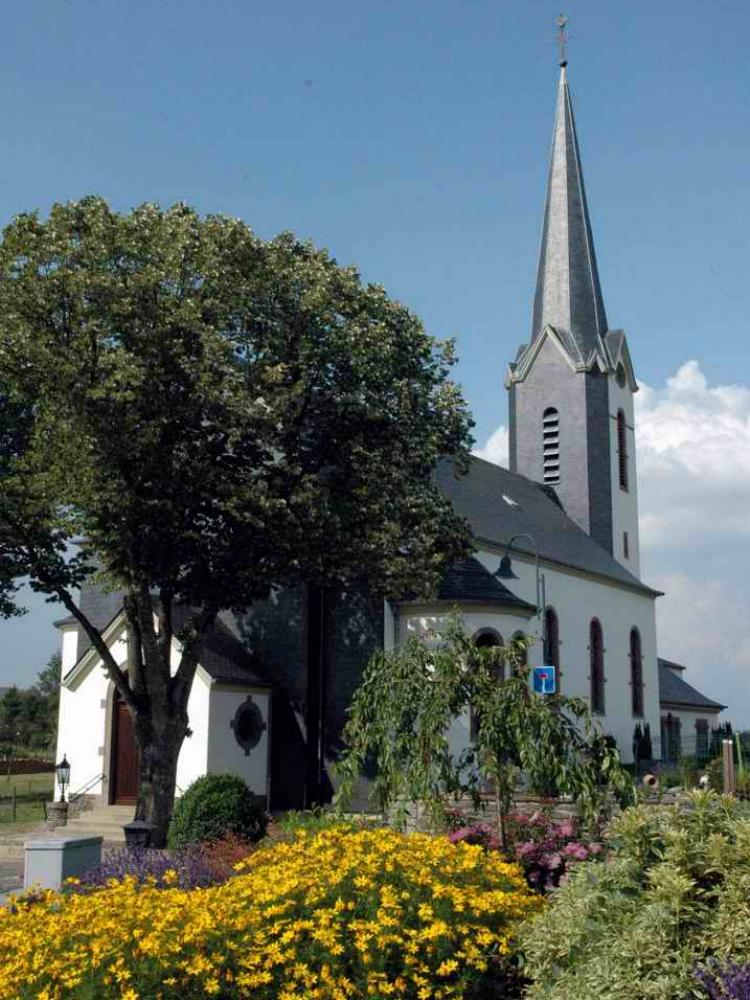
- Eschweiler church

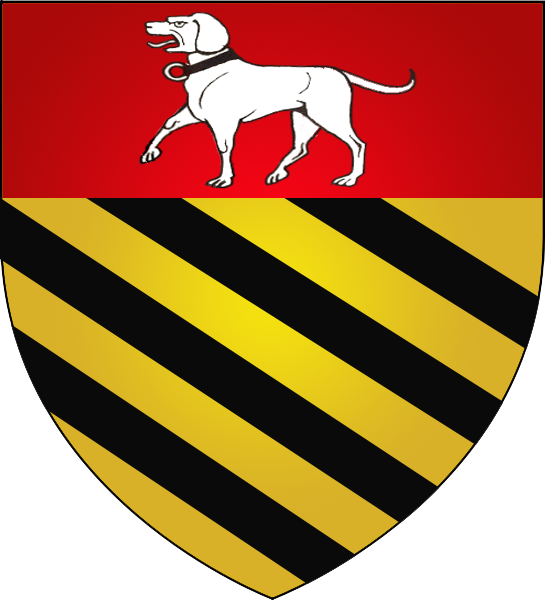
- Coat of arms

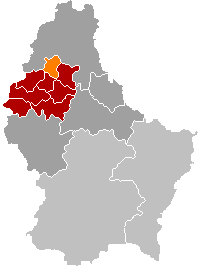
- Map of Luxembourg with Eschweiler highlighted in orange, and the canton in dark red
- Coordinates: 49.9972°N 5.9472°E
- Country: Luxembourg
- Canton: Wiltz
- commune: Wiltz
  - Rank: ? of 102
  - Rank: ? of 102
  - Rank: ? of 102
- Time zone: UTC+1 (CET)
  - Summer (DST): UTC+2 (CEST)
- LAU 2: LU00005003
- Website: eschweiler.lu

Eschweiler (German pronunciation: [ˈɛʃvaɪlɐ]) is a small town in northern Luxembourg. It is located in the canton of Wiltz, which is part of the district of Diekirch.

It was formerly a commune, but was merged with the commune of Wiltz in 2015.

As of September 2026, the town of Eschweiler has a population of 388.

== Former commune ==
The former commune consisted of the villages:

- Eschweiler
- Erpeldange
- Knaphoscheid
- Selscheid
- Eschweiler-Halte (lieu-dit)
- Klenghouschent (lieu-dit)
