= Knaphoscheid =

Coordinates: 50°01′N 5°58′E

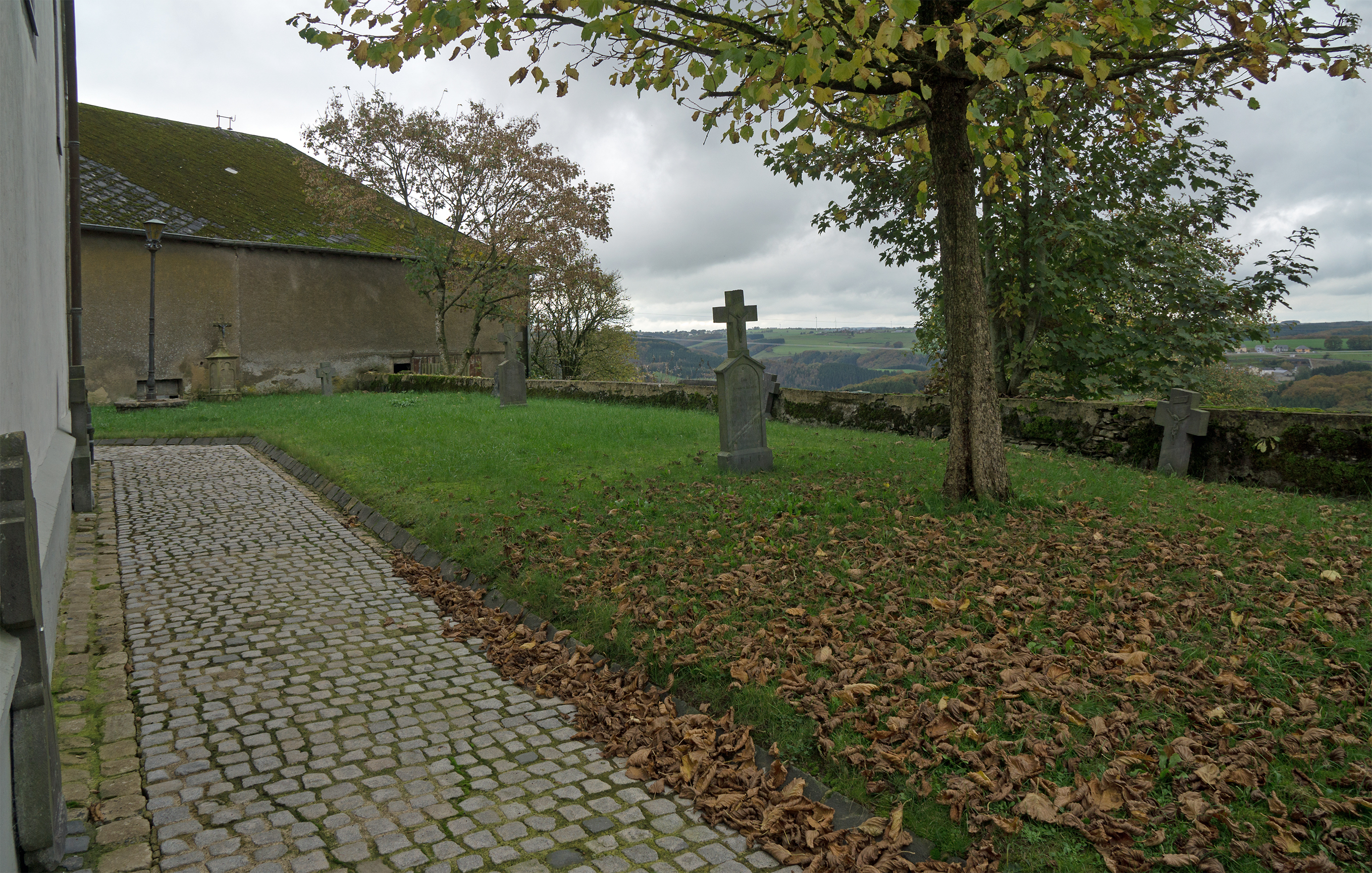
Old cemetery of Knaphoscheid

Knaphoscheid (Luxembourgish: Knapphouschent) is a village in the commune of Wiltz, in northern Luxembourg. As of September 2026, the village had a population of 308.
