= Raphael Freienstein =

German cyclist (born 1991)

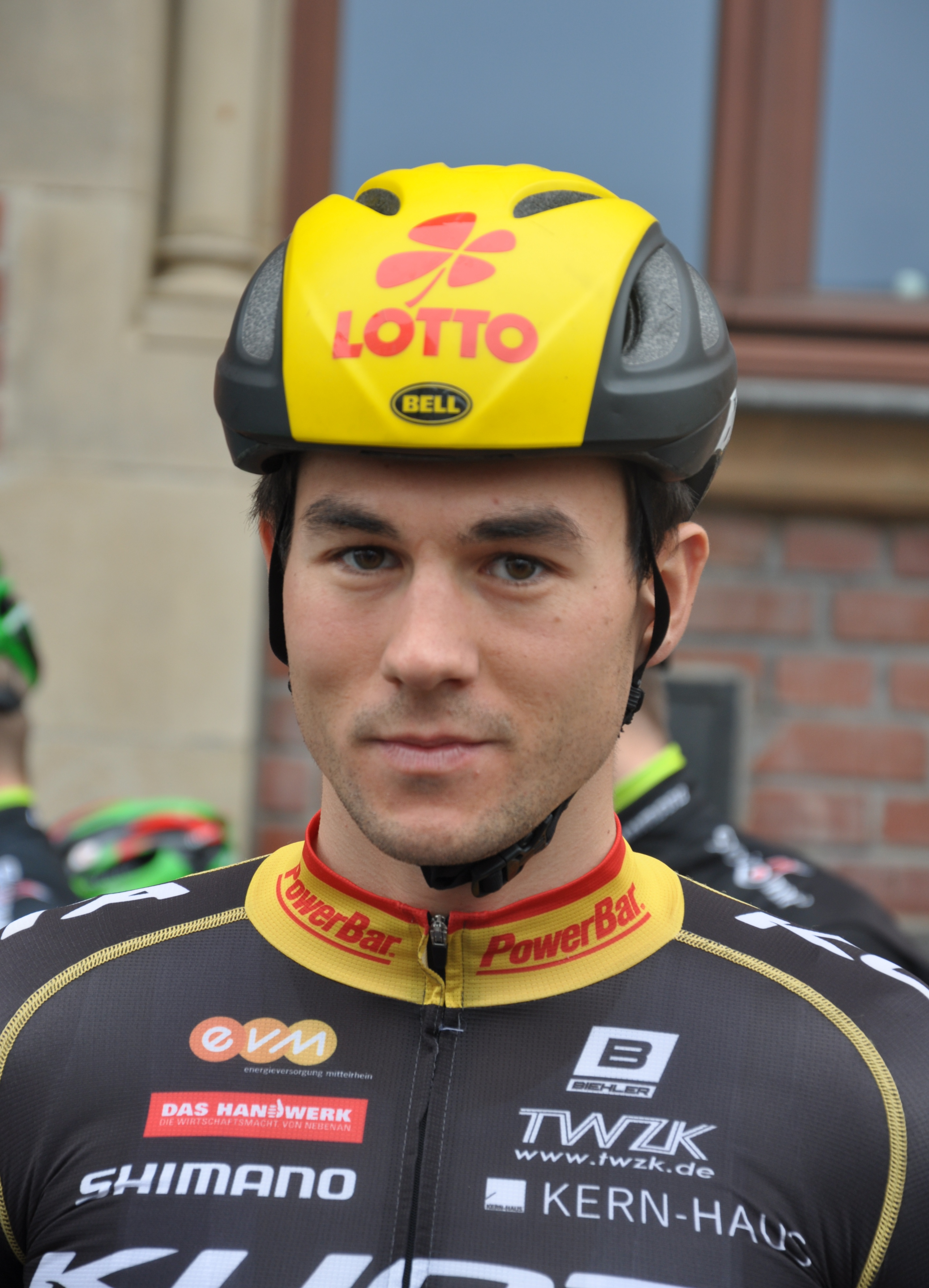
- Freienstein in 2016

Personal information
- Full name: Raphael Freienstein
- Born: 8 April 1991 (age 35) Marburg, Germany

Cycling career
- Sport: Cycling
- Current team: Retired
- Discipline: Road
- Role: Rider

Amateur teams
- 2004–2008: RV 1906 Bann
- 2009: RSC Felsenland
- 2009: Radsportverband Rheinland Pfalz
- 2010–2011: Athletik Club 1892 Weinheim
- 2010–2011: RG Team Bergstraße
- 2014: FV Olympia Ramstein
- 2018: Cycling Team Bochum
- 2018: Embrace The World/Olympia Bünde

Professional teams
- 2012–2013: Team Heizomat
- 2015: Charter Mason–Giant Racing Team
- 2016–2017: Team Kuota–Lotto

Raphael Freienstein (born 8 April 1991) is a German former professional cyclist.

== Major results ==
2013
3rd Road race, National Under-23 Road Championships
9th Road race, National Road Championships
2016
6th Time trial, National Road Championships
8th Rad am Ring
2017
2nd Overall Flèche du Sud

1st Stage 2

6th Overall CCC Tour-Grodów Piastowskich
8th Road race, National Road Championships
8th Overall Tour of Rhodes
