= Wiltz =

Town in Luxembourg

Wiltz Wolz, Wooltz
- Commune
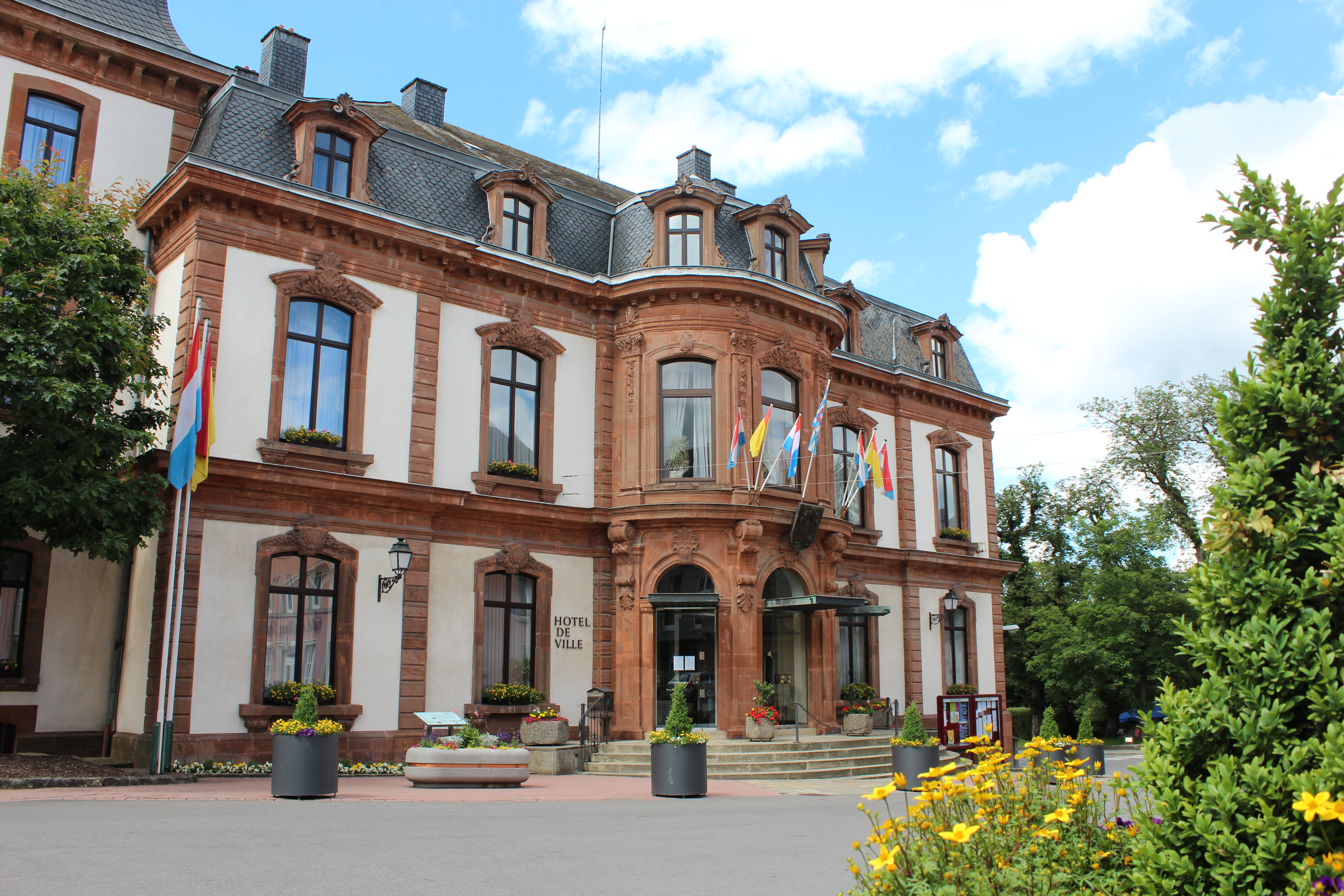
- Town hall

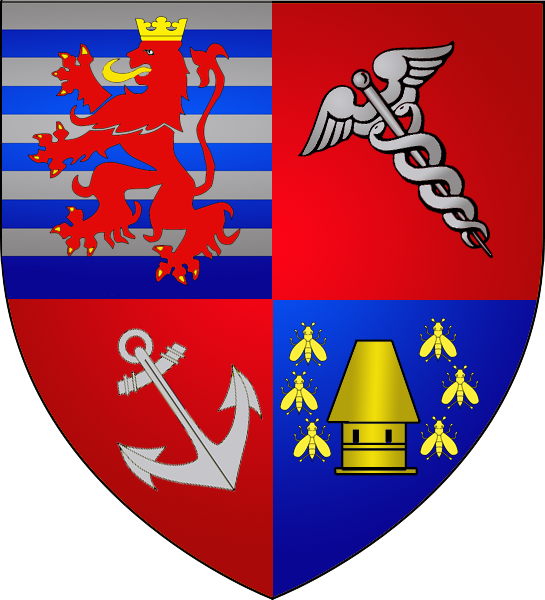
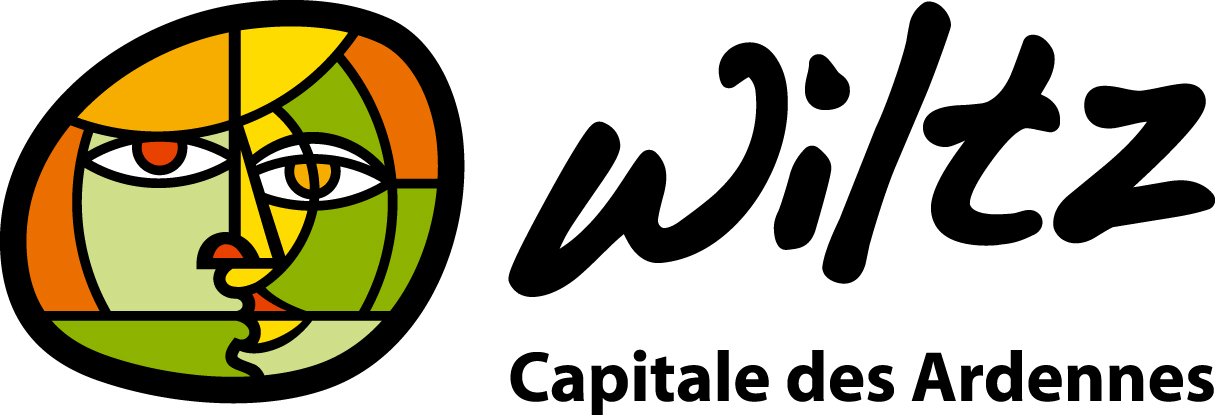
- Coat of arms Brandmark

- Map of Luxembourg with Wiltz highlighted in orange, and the canton in dark red
- Coordinates: 49.9661°N 5.9325°E
- Country: Luxembourg
- Canton: Wiltz

Government
  - Mayor: Patrick Comes (LSAP)

Area
  - Total: 39.25 km^{2} (15.15 sq mi)
  - Rank: 14th of 100
- Highest elevation: 518 m (1,699 ft)
  - Rank: 14th of 100
- Lowest elevation: 285 m (935 ft)
  - Rank: 87th of 100

Population (2026)
  - Total: 8,609
  - Rank: 19th of 100
  - Density: 219.3/km^{2} (568.1/sq mi)
  - Rank: 41st of 100
- Time zone: UTC+1 (CET)
  - Summer (DST): UTC+2 (CEST)
- LAU 2: LU0000807
- Website: wiltz.lu

Wiltz (German pronunciation: [ˈvɪlts]; Luxembourgish: Wolz [ˈvolts] or (locally) Wooltz [ˈvoːlts]) is a commune with city status in north-western Luxembourg, situated in the canton of the same name. Wiltz is situated on the banks of the river Wiltz. It was also a battleground in the Battle of the Bulge, near the end of World War II. A local airfield (near the village of Noertrange) was used by both sides of the conflict, depending on the location of the Front.

As of September 2026, the town of Wiltz, which lies in the south of the commune, has a population of 6,234.

== Populated places ==
The commune consists of the following villages:

Wiltz Section:

- Roullingen
- Weidingen
- Wiltz
- Batzendellt (lieu-dit)
- Kautenbach (lieu-dit)
- Lameschmillen (lieu-dit)
- Niederwiltz (lieu-dit)
- Nocher-Route (lieu-dit)

Eschweiler Section:

- Eschweiler
- Erpeldange
- Knaphoscheid
- Selscheid
- Eschweiler-Halte (lieu-dit)
- Klenghouschent (lieu-dit)

== History ==
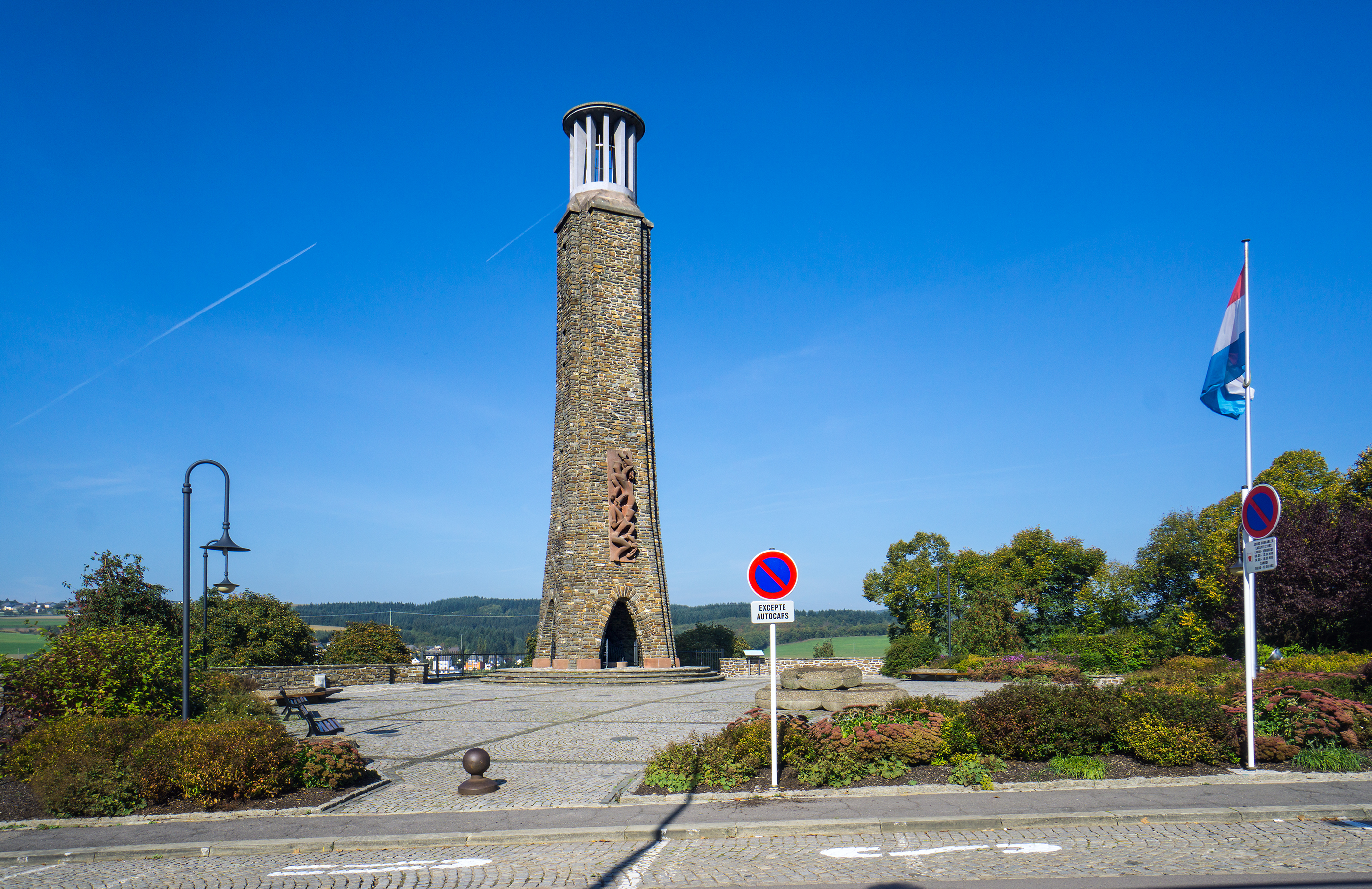
The Strike Monument

The name "Wiltz" comes from a Celtic word meaning "on the creek." Wiltz was originally inhabited by the Celts, and was first documented in 764AD. It received its town rights in 1240. The counts of Wiltz are among the oldest in Luxembourg.

One of the main features of the town is Wiltz Castle which belonged to the former Counts of Wiltz. This castle, which is situated on 600 acres (2.4 km^{2}) of lawns and gardens, contains hundreds of rooms. It was completed in 1727, and the final Count died in 1793. It served as a private girls school from 1851 until 1950, and became a retirement home after that. The industrialisation of Wiltz was advanced in the late 19th and early 20th century by the leather industry, namely by IDÉAL Tannerie de Wiltz S.A. belonging to the Adler & Oppenheimer trust.

During World War II, Luxembourg was occupied 10 May 1940 (the first day of the Battle of France). On 31 August 1942, a general strike was initiated in Wiltz, that spread throughout the country.

On 16 December 1944, the Wehrmacht surprisingly began the Ardennes Offensive. Norman Cota, the commander of the 28th Infantry Division and his staff left Wiltz when the Germans came nearer. In the evening of 19 December, after some combat, the last Americans left Wiltz.

In January 1945, Wiltz was again liberated by American troops after intensive combats during the days before.

Wiltz was named Martyr Town after the war. A monument representing a lighthouse was erected to commemorate the victims of the repression following the 1942 General Strike.

In 2015, Wiltz absorbed the neighbouring commune of Eschweiler.

=== Wiltz' "American Saint Nicholas" ===
In 1944, Wiltz had been under German occupation for about four years; among the many negative effects of the occupation, they had been unable to hold their traditional Saint Nicholas Day celebrations. After American troops arrived in Wiltz in the fall. Members of the 28th Infantry Division decided to do what they could for the children of Wiltz and organized a holiday celebration to lift their spirits.

Soldiers pooled their rations to provide candy and chocolate for the children. Corporal Richard Brookins, a tall encryptionist and projectionist, was recruited to portray St. Nicholas himself (Kleeschen in Luxembourgish), making use of the local priest's vestments, a beard of rope, and a bishop's miter constructed by the local nuns. On December 5, 1944, he was driven through town in a jeep, rather than the traditional carriage, and gave out candy to the children. The role only lasted a few hours, and in less than two weeks the German forces had pushed back into Wiltz as part of the Battle of the Bulge. But the people of Wiltz didn't forget what the Americans had done for them.

In 1947, Wiltz reinstated their Saint Nicholas Day celebrations, but the goal was not just to honor Saint Nicholas, but also to honor the "American St. Nick", as a representative of all of the American forces who had fought to liberate Luxembourg. His identity remained a mystery until 1977, when Brookins' fellow infantryman Frank McClelland tracked him down and delivered a handwritten message from the people of Wiltz inviting Brookins back to town. Brookins had had no idea his brief role had been remembered after all that time. Brookins would return to Wiltz six times, the last in 2014. He was granted honorary citizenship of Wiltz, and in 2009 they erected a monument in his honor. In 2016, the government of Luxembourg awarded him the Luxembourg Military Honor Medal; he died in 2018, aged 96.

== Town centre ==
Wiltz has a quiet town centre. There is an outdoor musical hall with bands and classical musical shows held typically every fortnight. Looking out from the hill on the music hall one will see the largest lake in the country at Esch-sur-Sure, located around 20 km away. A local multi-carriage tourist "road-train" takes visitors around the village and its surroundings on the hour.

There is also an international soccer training pitch. In the heart of Wiltz, there is a World War II tank parked in the main plaza. One of the most popular nights out is the summer rave held 10 km in the wilderness.

=== Attractions ===
Wiltz is a major centre for the international scouting movement. There are many scout campsites and buildings surrounding the town. The International Scouting One Penny Monument, dedicated to Robert Baden-Powell, is located in Wiltz.

Nearby Wiltz, on a hill overlooking the town, the Sanctuary of Our Lady of Fatima is the site of an annual pilgrimage on Ascension Day. In particular it attracts many of the Portuguese people who form a sizeable proportion of the population of Luxembourg.

The Festival of Wiltz, a music and performing arts festival, takes place every summer.

== Population ==
Historical population

Year	Pop.	±%
1821	2,735	—
1851	4,105	+50.1%
1900	3,918	−4.6%
1910	3,969	+1.3%
1922	4,025	+1.4%
1935	4,794	+19.1%

Year	Pop.	±%
1947	4,649	−3.0%
1960	4,365	−6.1%
1970	4,320	−1.0%
1981	4,191	−3.0%
1990	4,267	+1.8%
2000	5,155	+20.8%

Year	Pop.	±%
2005	5,305	+2.9%
2010	5,702	+7.5%
2015	6,387	+12.0%
2020	7,273	+13.9%
2021	7,533	+3.6%

Source data

== Tourism ==
In 2015 it was the venue for the Linuxbierwanderung.

== Notable people ==
- Richard Brookins (1922–2018), soldier and honorary citizen
- Steve Jans (born 1988), racing driver
- Kevin Malget (born 1991), footballer
- Guy de Muyser (1926−2024), diplomat and economist
- Romain Schneider (born 1962), politician
- Paul Wilwertz (1905–1979), politician

== See also ==
- FC Wiltz 71
- Wiltz Castle
- Wiltz railway station
