= Roompot–Charles =

Dutch cycling team

Team information
- UCI code: ROC
- Registered: The Netherlands
- Founded: 2015
- Disbanded: 2019
- Discipline: Road
- Status: UCI Professional Continental
- Bicycles: Isaac (2015–2018); Factor Bikes (2019)
- Website: Team home page

Key personnel
- General manager: Erik Breukink

Team name history
- 2015 2016 2017–2018 2019: Team Roompot; Roompot–Oranje Peloton; Team Roompot–Nederlandse Loterij; Roompot–Charles
Roompot–Charles jersey
Jersey

Roompot–Charles (UCI team code: ROC) was a Dutch UCI Professional Continental men's cycling team. The team's principal sponsor was Roompot Vakanties, a Dutch holiday company. The team's first season was the 2015 cycling season, during which the team was invited to participate in UCI World Tour races including the 2015 Eneco Tour and the 2015 Tour of Flanders, as well as various other spring classics races. The team only hired Dutch cyclists, the most prominent of whom was Johnny Hoogerland. Roompot's debut race was the 2015 Vuelta a Mallorca stage race. The team's first win came in August 2015 in the Tour du Limousin, where Maurits Lammertink won a bunch sprint.

== History ==
Roompot's beginnings came in the spring of 2014, when Erik Breukink, who was formerly the manager of the Dutch team Rabobank, announced that he was seeking to create a new Dutch squad to ride at the UCI Professional Continental level. There were Dutch teams riding at UCI World Tour and UCI Continental levels, but none in the middle tier of professional cycling. Breukink announced his hope that the team would support the development of young Dutch riders. Other people involved in the development of the team included Michael Boogerd, Jean-Paul van Poppel and Michael Zijlaard.

While the team was under development, it was known as Orange Cycling in reference to the national colour of the Netherlands. The team sought sponsorship from several companies, but most prominently from Roompot Vakanties. Another Dutch team, WorldTour team Belkin Pro Cycling, were also seeking a new title sponsor and were seen as in direct competition with Orange Cycling for the Roompot sponsorship.

On 13 August 2014, it was announced that Roompot had decided to sponsor the Orange Cycling project, apparently in part because the intention only to sign Dutch riders matched Roompot's marketing strategy. The following day, the team announced its first rider, Johnny Hoogerland, who had previously ridden for another Dutch team, Vacansoleil–DCM.

The team was launched on 2 January 2015, at the Six Days of Rotterdam. The launch gave prominence to the squad's Dutch identity, including the return of orange cycling jerseys, traditionally the colour of the Rabobank team. Breukink announced that the team would race for the first time at the Vuelta a Mallorca, and was considering the possibility of applying to participate in the 2015 Vuelta a España.

The team made its debut at the 2015 Trofeo Santanyi-Ses Salines-Campos, part of the Vuelta a Mallorca. Raymond Kreder finished in sixth place. He also took the team's next top 10 result: ninth place in the 2015 Kuurne–Brussels–Kuurne. Kreder finished in third place on the final stage of the 2015 Volta ao Algarve, but he was relegated to the back of the group for improper sprinting.

Roompot's first top-ten results of the spring classics season came in Drenthe, with fourth place for Jesper Asselman in the Ronde van Drenthe and ninth place for Wesley Kreder the following day in the Dwars door Drenthe. André Looij also finished fourth in the Handzame Classic.

In the 2015 Eneco Tour, Asselman spent two days in the breakaway and picked up bonus seconds that put him in the race lead. This was the first time that any Roompot rider had led any UCI-ranked race. The following week, the team won its first ever victory: Maurits Lammertink won a bunch sprint on the final stage of the Tour du Limousin. This was followed the same day by the team's second victory through Dylan Groenewegen in the Arnhem–Veenendaal Classic.

For the 2016 season, Roompot signed Pieter Weening from Orica–GreenEDGE, a rider who had won three grand tour stages in the past. He attributed his decision to sign for the team to its Dutch identity; it was also suggested that the team may receive a wildcard entry for the 2016 Giro d'Italia, which starts in the Netherlands.

In August 2018 it was announced that the team would merge with the Vérandas Willems–Crelan team for the 2019 season under the name Roompot–Crelan, which later became Roompot–Charles.

== Final team roster ==
As of 24 January 2019.

Rider	Date of birth
Jesper Asselman (NED)	12 March 1990 (age 36)
Lars Boom (NED)	30 December 1985 (age 40)
Sean De Bie (BEL)	3 October 1991 (age 34)
Mathias De Witte (BEL)	29 March 1993 (age 33)
Huub Duyn (NED)	1 September 1984 (age 42)
Maurits Lammertink (NED)	31 August 1990 (age 36)
Senne Leysen (BEL)	18 March 1996 (age 30)
Arjen Livyns (BEL)	1 September 1994 (age 32)
Elmar Reinders (NED)	14 March 1992 (age 34)

Rider	Date of birth
Oscar Riesebeek (NED)	23 December 1992 (age 33)
Stijn Steels (BEL)	21 August 1989 (age 37)
Justin Timmermans (NED)	25 September 1996 (age 29)
Nick van der Lijke (NED)	23 September 1991 (age 34)
Sjoerd van Ginneken (NED)	6 November 1992 (age 33)
Boy van Poppel (NED)	18 January 1988 (age 38)
Jan-Willem van Schip (NED)	20 August 1994 (age 32)
Michael Van Staeyen (BEL)	13 August 1988 (age 38)
Pieter Weening (NED)	5 April 1981 (age 45)

== Major wins ==
2015
Stage 4 Tour du Limousin, Maurits Lammertink
Arnhem–Veenendaal Classic, Dylan Groenewegen
Brussels Cycling Classic, Dylan Groenewegen
2016
Ronde van Drenthe, Jesper Asselman
Overall Tour of Norway, Pieter Weening

Stage 2, Pieter Weening

Overall Tour de Luxembourg Maurits Lammertink

Young rider Classification

Stage 6 Tour de Suisse, Pieter Weening
2017
Stage 3 Tour of Norway, Pieter Weening
Schaal Sels, Taco van der Hoorn
2018
Stage 3 Tour of Austria, Pieter Weening
KOGA Slag om Norg, Jan-Willem van Schip
Stage 3 Binck Bank Tour, Taco van der Hoorn
Omloop Mandel-Leie-Schelde Meulebeke, Wouter Wippert
Primus Classic, Taco van der Hoorn
2019
Points race, UCI Track World Championships, Jan-Willem van Schip
Stage 1 Tour de Yorkshire, Jesper Asselman
Mountains classification Tour of Norway Elmar Reinders
Stage 2 Tour de Luxembourg, Pieter Weening
Stage 1 Tour of Belgium, Jan-Willem van Schip
GP Briek Schotte, Arjen Livyns
