= Luxembourgish National Cyclo-cross Championships =

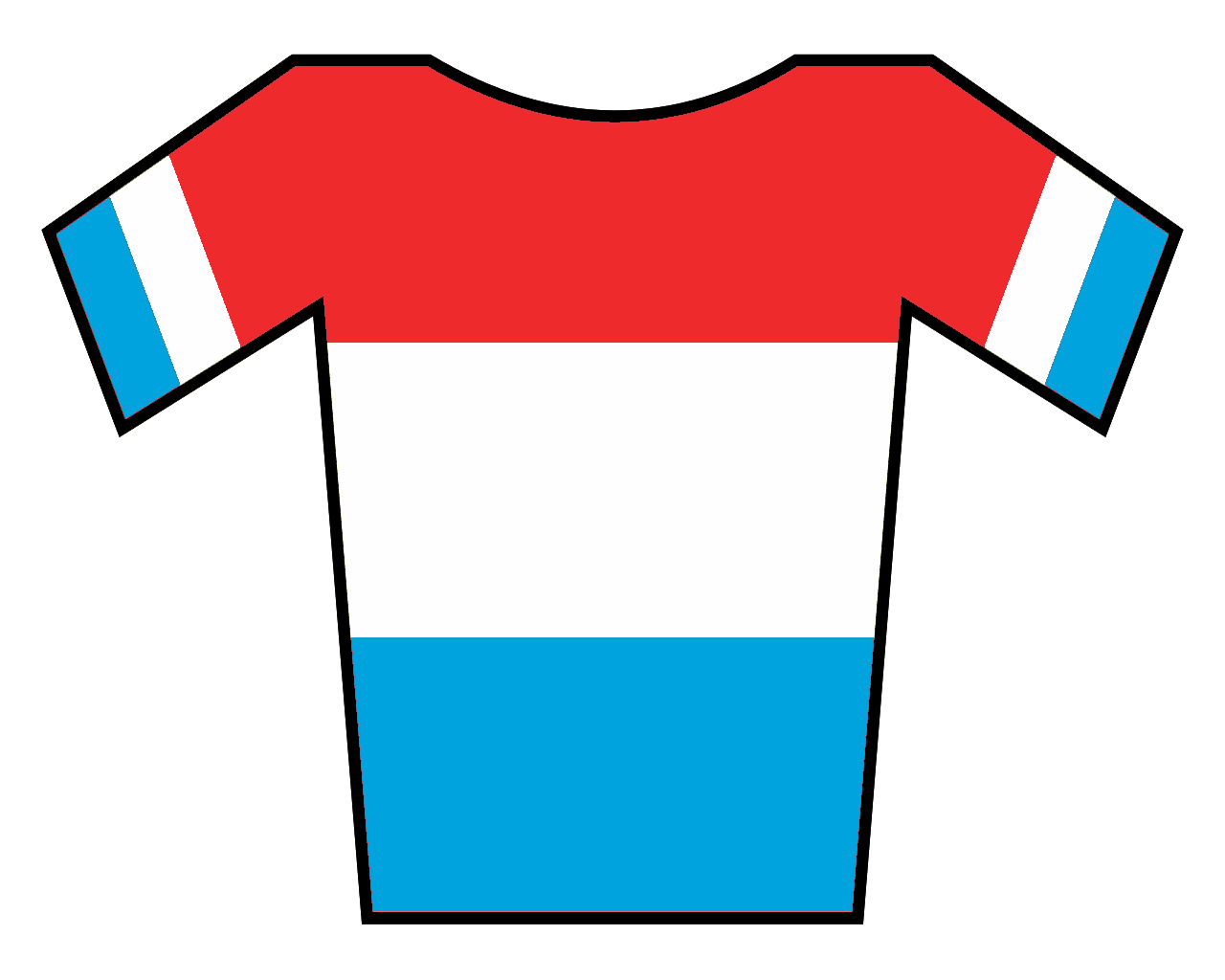
- The champion's jersey

Race details
- Region: Luxembourg
- Discipline: Cyclo-cross
- Type: National championship
- Organiser: Luxembourg Cycling Federation

History
- First edition: 1920
- First winner: Felix Neyen
- Most wins: Claude Michely (12 wins)
- Most recent: Loïc Bettendorff

The Luxembourgish National Cyclo-cross Championships are held annually to decide the Luxembourgish cycling champions in the cyclo-cross discipline, across various categories.

== Men ==
=== Elite ===
Year	Winner	Second	Third
1920	Félix Neyen	Nicolas Marso	Michel Wolff
1921	Michel Wolff	Nicolas Marso	Nicolas Neu
1922	Joseph Rasqui	Michel Wolff	Jean-Pierre Engel
1923	Nicolas Frantz	Michel Wolff	Joseph Rasqui
1924	Nicolas Frantz	Jean-Pierre Engel	Charles Krier
1925	Jean-Pierre Engel	Charles Krier	Joseph Rasqui
1926	Jean-Pierre Engel	Nicolas Frantz	Charles Krier
1928	Josy Kraus	Justin Goedert	Norbert Sinner
1929	Charles Krier	Josy Kraus	Jean-Pierre Muller
1930	Josy Kraus	Jean-Pierre Muller	Charles Krier
1931	Josy Kraus	Jean-Pierre Muller	Jean Ferrari
1932	Jean-Pierre Muller	Arnold Schaack	
1933	Josy Mersch	Jean-Pierre Muller	Arsène Mersch
1934	Josy Mersch	Arsène Mersch	Marcel Schneider
1935	Josy Mersch	Arsène Mersch	Mathias Clemens
1936	Arsène Mersch	Josy Mersch	Pierre Clemens
1937	Josy Mersch	Arsène Mersch	Abramo Dall'Agnol
1938	Arsène Mersch	Abramo Dall'Agnol	
1939	Arsène Mersch	Abramo Dall'Agnol	Joseph Bintener
1940	Mathias Clemens	Lucien Bidinger	Abramo Dall'Agnol
1947	Jean Goldschmit	Jean Diederich	Mathias Clemens
1948	Jean Kirchen	Abramo Dall'Agnol	Marcel Poire
1949	Roger Jacobs	Jean Igel	Abramo Dall'Agnol
1950	Roger Jacobs	Pitty Scheer	Jean Igel
1951	Roger Jacobs	Jean Kirchen	Pitty Scheer
1952	Jean Kirchen	Roger Ludwig	Marco Thewes
1953	Johny Goedert	Marco Thewes	Pity Scher
1954	Charly Gaul	Johny Goedert	Pitty Scheer
1955	Jean Schmit	Pitty Scheer	Marco Thewes
1956	Jean Schmit	Johny Goedert	Pitty Scheer
1957	Jean Schmit	Marco Thewes	Raymond Kramp
1958	Jean Schmit	Marco Thewes	Schwarz
1959	Marco Thewes	Jean Schmit	Gilbert Schmartz
1960	Jean Schmit	Marco Thewes	Gilbert Schmartz
1961	Jean Schmit	Georges Richartz	Robert Houdremont
1962	Charly Gaul	Raymond Jacobs	Marco Thewes
1963	Jean Schmit	Nicolas Morn	Jean-Pierre Witry
1964	Nicolas Morn	Gilbert Schmartz	Marco Thewes
1965	Jean Schmit	Gilbert Schmartz	Marco Thewes
1966	Gilbert Schmartz	Marco Thewes	Roger Gilson
1967	Nicolas Morn	Georges Richartz	Joseph Johanns
1968	Nicolas Morn	Johny Michely	Marco Thewes
1969	Johny Michely	Georges Richartz	Lucien Zeimes
1970	Lucien Zeimes	Johny Michely	Roger Gilson
1971	Lucien Zeimes	Johny Michely	Nicolas Morn
1972	Lucien Zeimes	Lucien Didier	Johny Michely
1973	Johny Michely	Lucien Didier	Lucien Zeimes
1974	Lucien Didier	Johny Michely	Georges Schranz
1975	Johny Michely	Lucien Zeimes	Georges Schranz
1976	Lucien Zeimes	Johny Michely	L. Laurens
1977	Roger Gilson	Lucien Zeimes	Nico Ney
1978	Unawarded	Lucien Zeimes	Jean Becker
1979	Claude Michely	Roger Gilson	Lucien Zeimes
1980	Claude Michely	Roger Gilson	Lucien Zeimes
1981	Claude Michely	Lucien Zeimes	Nico Ney
1982	Claude Michely	Lucien Zeimes	Nico Ney
1983	Claude Michely	Lucien Zeimes	Jean-Pierre Drucker senior
1984	Claude Michely	Nico Ney	André Heuertz
1985	Claude Michely	Henri Schnadt	Pascal Triebel
1986	Claude Michely	Nico Ney	Daniel Wirth
1987	Claude Michely	Jean-Pierre Drucker senior	Olivier Triebel
1988	Claude Michely	Jean-Pierre Drucker senior	Olivier Triebel
1989	Claude Michely	Jean-Pierre Drucker senior	Pascal Meyers
1990	Claude Michely	Olivier Triebel	Pascal Triebel
1991	Jean-Pierre Drucker senior	Claude Michely	Olivier Triebel
1992	Jean-Pierre Drucker senior	Claude Michely	Pascal Meyers
1993	Pascal Meyers	Jean-Pierre Drucker senior	Laurent Wack
1994	Pascal Triebel	Pascal Meyers	Virgile Maus
1995	Pascal Triebel	Claude Michely	Pascal Meyers
1996	Pascal Triebel	Pascal Meyers	Virgile Maus
1997	Pascal Triebel	Claude Michely	Max Becker
1998	Pascal Triebel	Daniel Bintz	Marco Lux
1999	Daniel Bintz	Jerome Junker	Jean-Pierre Serafini
2000	Pascal Triebel	Joel Schwinninger	Jean-Pierre Serafini
2001	Pascal Triebel	Gusty Bausch	Steve Fogen
2002	Pascal Triebel	Christian Poos	Jean-Pierre Serafini
2003	Gusty Bausch	Pascal Triebel	Jerome Junker
2004	Tom Flammang	Pascal Triebel	Gusty Bausch
2005	Gusty Bausch	Tom Flammang	Pascal Triebel
2006	Jempy Drucker	Gusty Bausch	Pascal Triebel
2007	Gusty Bausch	Pascal Triebel	Jempy Drucker
2008	Jempy Drucker	Gusty Bausch	Pascal Triebel
2009	Gusty Bausch	Pit Schlechter	Tom Flammang
2010	Jempy Drucker	Gusty Bausch	Pit Schlechter
2011	Jempy Drucker	Gusty Bausch	Pascal Triebel
2012	Gusty Bausch	Christian Helmig	Pascal Triebel
2013	Christian Helmig	Massimo Morabito	Scott Thiltges
2014	Christian Helmig	Massimo Morabito	Tom Flammang
2015	Christian Helmig	Gusty Bausch	Vincent Dias Dos Santos
2016	Christian Helmig	Gusty Bausch	Massimo Morabito
2017	Scott Thiltges	Pit Schlechter	Gusty Bausch
2018	Søren Nissen	Gusty Bausch	Vincent Dias Dos Santos
2019	Vincent Dias Dos Santos	Gusty Bausch	Scott Thiltges
2020	Lex Reichling	Scott Thiltges	Vincent Dias Dos Santos
2022	Scott Thiltges	Raphaël Kockelman	Ken Conter
2023	Raphaël Kockelman	Ken Conter	Cédric Pries
2024	Loïc Bettendorff	Raphaël Kockelman	Ken Conter
2025	Loïc Bettendorff	Raphaël Kockelman	Ken Conter
2026	Loïc Bettendorff	Raphaël Kockelman	Ken Conter

=== Under-23 ===
- 1999 : Kim Kirchen
- 2000 : Steve Fogen
- 2001 : Gusty Bausch
- 2002 : Gusty Bausch
- 2003 : Marc Ernster
- 2004 : Marc Ernster
- 2005 : Jempy Drucker
- 2006 : Jempy Drucker
- 2007 : Jempy Drucker
- 2008 : David Claerebout
- 2010 : Pit Schlechter
- 2011 : Pit Schlechter
- 2014 : Massimo Morabito
- 2017 : Luc Turchi
- 2018 : Félix Schreiber
- 2019 : Nicolas Kess
- 2020 : Loïc Bettendorff
- 2022 : Loïc Bettendorff
- 2023 : Mats Wenzel
- 2024 : Mats Wenzel

=== Junior ===
- 1996 : Max Becker
- 1997 : Steve Fogen
- 1998 : Gusty Bausch
- 1999 : Marc Bastian
- 2000 : Marc Ernster
- 2001 : Marc Ernster
- 2002 : Andy Schleck
- 2003 : Jempy Drucker
- 2004 : Jempy Drucker
- 2005 : Kim Michely
- 2006 : David Schloesser
- 2007 : Tom Thill
- 2008 : Vincent Dias dos Santos
- 2009 : Bob Jungels
- 2010 : Bob Jungels
- 2011 : Tom Schwarmes
- 2012 : Sven Fritsch
- 2013 : Ken Mueller
- 2014 : Ken Mueller
- 2015 : Kevin Geniets
- 2016 : Michel Ries
- 2017 : Tristan Parrotta
- 2018 : Nicolas Kess
- 2019 : Loïc Bettendorff
- 2020 : Mats Wenzel
- 2022 : Mathieu Kockelmann
- 2023 : Noa Berton
- 2024 : Rick Meylender

== Women ==
=== Elite ===
Year	Winner	Second	Third
1997	Suzie Godart		
1998	Suzie Godart	Veronique Raach	Vanessa Junker
1999	Suzie Godart	Claude Hermann	
2001	Suzie Godart		
2002	Suzie Godart		
2003	Suzie Godart	Samantha Toschi	
2004	Suzie Godart	Nathalie Lamborelle	
2006	Isabelle Hoffmann	Suzie Godart	
2007	Nathalie Lamborelle	Suzie Godart	Christine Majerus
2008	Nathalie Lamborelle	Suzie Godart	Christine Majerus
2009	Suzie Godart	Christine Majerus	Nathalie Lamborelle
2010	Christine Majerus	Anne-Marie Schmitt	Alessia Merten
2011	Christine Majerus	Nathalie Lamborelle	Suzie Godart
2012	Christine Majerus	Suzie Godart	Alessia Merten
2013	Christine Majerus	Suzie Godart	Edie Antonia Rees
2014	Christine Majerus	Suzie Godart	Beatrice Godart
2015	Christine Majerus	Suzie Godart	Beatrice Godart
2016	Christine Majerus	Edie Antonia Rees	Suzie Godart
2017	Christine Majerus	Nathalie Lamborelle	Suzie Godart
2018	Christine Majerus	Nathalie Lamborelle	Elise Maes
2019	Christine Majerus	Elise Maes	Suzie Godart
2020	Christine Majerus	Elise Maes	Pia Wiltgen
2022	Christine Majerus	Isabelle Klein	Suzie Godart
2023	Marie Schreiber	Isabelle Klein	Suzie Godart
2024	Marie Schreiber	Christine Majerus	Isabelle Klein

== See also ==
- Luxembourgish National Road Race Championships
- Luxembourgish National Time Trial Championships
