= List of teams and cyclists in the 1951 Tour de France =

List of cyclists

As was the custom since 1930, the 1951 Tour de France was contested by national and regional teams. The three major cycling countries in 1951, Italy, Belgium and France, each sent a team of 12 cyclists. Other countries sent teams of 8 cyclists: Switzerland, Luxembourg, Netherlands and Spain. The French regional cyclists were divided into four teams of 12 cyclists: Paris, Ile de France–North West, East–South East and West–South West. The last team of eight cyclists was made up out of cyclists from the French North African colonies. In the end, Luxembourg only sent 7 cyclists, so altogether this made 123 cyclists.

There were 68 French cyclists (of which 1 French-Moroccan and 7 French-Algerian), 12 Italian, 12 Belgian, 8 Dutch, 8 Spanish, 8 Swiss and 7 Luxembourgian cyclists.

== Start list ==
=== By team ===
Switzerland
No.	Rider	Pos.
1	Georges Aeschlimann (SUI)	24
2	Marcel Huber (SUI)	35
3	Hugo Koblet (SUI)	1
4	Walter Reiser (SUI)	DNF
5	Giovanni Rossi (SUI)	DNF
6	Hans Sommer (SUI)	28
7	Gottfried Weilenmann (SUI)	50
8	Leo Weilenmann (SUI)	60

Italy
No.	Rider	Pos.
13	Gino Bartali (ITA)	4
14	Serafino Biagioni (ITA)	15
15	Fausto Coppi (ITA)	10
16	Andrea Carrea (ITA)	38
17	Franco Franchi (ITA)	29
18	Attilio Lambertini (ITA)	DNF
19	Fiorenzo Magni (ITA)	7
20	Ettore Milano (ITA)	52
21	Silvio Pedroni (ITA)	DNF
22	Luciano Pezzi (ITA)	48
23	Virgilio Salimbeni (ITA)	54
24	Renzo Zanazzi (ITA)	DNF

Belgium
No.	Rider	Pos.
25	Armand Baeyens (BEL)	40
26	Hilaire Couvreur (BEL)	42
27	Roger Decock (BEL)	17
28	Alois De Hertog (BEL)	22
29	Marcel De Mulder (BEL)	13
30	Isidore De Rijck (BEL)	DNF
31	Germain Derycke (BEL)	43
32	Stan Ockers (BEL)	5
33	André Rosseel (BEL)	25
34	Edward Van Ende (BEL)	14
35	Alois Vansteenkiste (BEL)	62
36	Marcel Verschueren (BEL)	18

France
No.	Rider	Pos.
37	Jean Baldassari (FRA)	56
38	Pierre Barbotin (FRA)	6
39	Louison Bobet (FRA)	20
40	Bernard Gauthier (FRA)	26
41	Raphaël Géminiani (FRA)	2
42	Jean Guéguen (FRA)	61
43	Nello Lauredi (FRA)	11
44	Apo Lazaridès (FRA)	DNF
45	Lucien Lazaridès (FRA)	3
46	Édouard Muller (FRA)	41
47	Raoul Rémy (FRA)	DNF
48	Lucien Teisseire (FRA)	31

Luxembourg
No.	Rider	Pos.
49	Robert Bintz (LUX)	DNF
50	Bim Diederich (LUX)	12
51	René Biver (LUX)	DNF
52	Jean Goldschmit (LUX)	DNF
53	Henri Kass (LUX)	DNF
54	Willy Kemp (LUX)	55
56	Josy Polfer (LUX)	DNF

Netherlands
No.	Rider	Pos.
57	Hans Dekkers (NED)	DNF
58	Wim Dielissen (NED)	DNF
59	Henk Faanhof (NED)	DNF
60	Gerard Peters (NED)	DNF
61	Harry Schoenmakers (NED)	DNF
62	Wim van Est (NED)	DNF
63	Gerrit Voorting (NED)	DNF
64	Wout Wagtmans (NED)	DNF

Spain
No.	Rider	Pos.
65	Vittorio Ruiz (ESP)	DNF
66	Miguel Gual (ESP)	DNF
67	Dalmacio Langarica (ESP)	58
68	Francisco Masip (ESP)	59
69	Emilio Rodríguez (ESP)	DNF
70	Manuel Rodríguez Barros (ESP)	44
71	Bernardo Ruiz (ESP)	9
72	José Serra (ESP)	DNF

France - Paris
No.	Rider	Pos.
73	Serge Blusson (FRA)	DNF
74	Robert Bonnaventure (FRA)	DNF
75	Louis Caput (FRA)	45
76	Jean-Louis Carle (FRA)	63
77	Robert Chapatte (FRA)	DNF
78	Jean Chateau (FRA)	DNF
79	Maurice Diot (FRA)	DNF
80	Dominique Forlini (FRA)	DNF
81	Marcel Michel (FRA)	DNF
82	Roger Piel (FRA)	DNF
83	Jacques Renaud (FRA)	DNF
84	Jean Robic (FRA)	27

France - Île-de-France/North-West
No.	Rider	Pos.
85	José Beyaert (FRA)	DNF
86	Roger Creton (FRA)	DNF
87	Jean Delahaye (FRA)	DNF
88	Louis Déprez (FRA)	37
89	André Labeylie (FRA)	46
90	Guy Lintilhac (FRA)	DNF
91	Lucien Maelfait (FRA)	DNF
92	Jacques Marinelli (FRA)	DNF
93	Maurice Quentin (FRA)	DNF
94	Roger Queugnet (FRA)	DNF
95	Attilio Redolfi (FRA)	DNF
96	Gino Sciardis (FRA)	51

France - East/South-East
No.	Rider	Pos.
97	Emile Baffert (FRA)	64
98	Gilbert Bauvin (FRA)	8
99	Pierre Brambilla (FRA)	36
100	Roger Buchonnet (FRA)	39
101	Robert Castellin (FRA)	DNF
102	Angelo Colinelli (FRA)	53
103	Adolphe Deledda (FRA)	32
104	Jean Dotto (FRA)	23
105	Paul Giguet (FRA)	34
106	Joseph Mirando (FRA)	47
107	Pierre Molineris (FRA)	DNF
108	Vincent Vitetta (FRA)	33

France - West/South-West
No.	Rider	Pos.
109	Armand Audaire (FRA)	DNF
110	Jean-Marie Cieleska (FRA)	DNF
111	Pierre Cogan (FRA)	19
112	Robert Desbats (FRA)	DNF
113	Jean-Marie Goasmat (FRA)	21
114	Raymond Guégan (FRA)	DNF
115	Roger Leveque (FRA)	30
116	André Mahe (FRA)	DNF
117	Georges Meunier (FRA)	16
118	Joseph Morvan (FRA)	49
119	André Ruffet (FRA)	DNF
120	Roger Walkowiak (FRA)	57

North Africa
No.	Rider	Pos.
121	Abdel-Kader Abbes (FRA)	DNF
122	Max Charroin (FRA)	DNF
123	Marcel Fernandez (FRA)	DNF
124	Ahmed Kebaili (FRA)	DNF
125	Manuel Mayen (FRA)	65
126	Vincent Soler (FRA)	DNF
127	Abdel-Kader Zaaf (FRA)	66
128	Marcel Zelasco (FRA)	DNF

=== By rider ===
Legend
No.	Starting number worn by the rider during the Tour
Pos.	Position in the general classification
DNF	Denotes a rider who did not finish

No.	Name	Nationality	Team	Pos.	Ref
1	Georges Aeschlimann	Switzerland	Switzerland	24	
2	Marcel Huber	Switzerland	Switzerland	35	
3	Hugo Koblet	Switzerland	Switzerland	1	
4	Walter Reiser	Switzerland	Switzerland	DNF	
5	Giovanni Rossi	Switzerland	Switzerland	DNF	
6	Hans Sommer	Switzerland	Switzerland	28	
7	Gottfried Weilenmann	Switzerland	Switzerland	50	
8	Leo Weilenmann	Switzerland	Switzerland	60	
13	Gino Bartali	Italy	Italy	4	
14	Serafino Biagioni	Italy	Italy	15	
15	Fausto Coppi	Italy	Italy	10	
16	Andrea Carrea	Italy	Italy	38	
17	Franco Franchi	Italy	Italy	29	
18	Attilio Lambertini	Italy	Italy	DNF	
19	Fiorenzo Magni	Italy	Italy	7	
20	Ettore Milano	Italy	Italy	52	
21	Silvio Pedroni	Italy	Italy	DNF	
22	Luciano Pezzi	Italy	Italy	48	
23	Virgilio Salimbeni	Italy	Italy	54	
24	Renzo Zanazzi	Italy	Italy	DNF	
25	Armand Baeyens	Belgium	Belgium	40	
26	Hilaire Couvreur	Belgium	Belgium	42	
27	Roger Decock	Belgium	Belgium	17	
28	Alois De Hertog	Belgium	Belgium	22	
29	Marcel De Mulder	Belgium	Belgium	13	
30	Isidore De Rijck	Belgium	Belgium	DNF	
31	Germain Derycke	Belgium	Belgium	43	
32	Stan Ockers	Belgium	Belgium	5	
33	André Rosseel	Belgium	Belgium	25	
34	Edward Van Ende	Belgium	Belgium	14	
35	Alois Vansteenkiste	Belgium	Belgium	62	
36	Marcel Verschueren	Belgium	Belgium	18	
37	Jean Baldassari	France	France	56	
38	Pierre Barbotin	France	France	6	
39	Louison Bobet	France	France	20	
40	Bernard Gauthier	France	France	26	
41	Raphaël Géminiani	France	France	2	
42	Jean Guéguen	France	France	61	
43	Nello Lauredi	France	France	11	
44	Apo Lazaridès	France	France	DNF	
45	Lucien Lazaridès	France	France	3	
46	Édouard Muller	France	France	41	
47	Raoul Rémy	France	France	DNF	
48	Lucien Teisseire	France	France	31	
49	Robert Bintz	Luxembourg	Luxembourg	DNF	
50	Bim Diederich	Luxembourg	Luxembourg	12	
51	René Biever	Luxembourg	Luxembourg	DNF	
52	Jean Goldschmit	Luxembourg	Luxembourg	DNF	
53	Henri Kass	Luxembourg	Luxembourg	DNF	
54	Willy Kemp	Luxembourg	Luxembourg	55	
56	Josy Polfer	Luxembourg	Luxembourg	DNF	
57	Hans Dekkers	Netherlands	Netherlands	DNF	
58	Wim Dielissen	Netherlands	Netherlands	DNF	
59	Henk Faanhof	Netherlands	Netherlands	DNF	
60	Gerard Peters	Netherlands	Netherlands	DNF	
61	Harrie Schoenmakers	Netherlands	Netherlands	DNF	
62	Wim van Est	Netherlands	Netherlands	DNF	
63	Gerrit Voorting	Netherlands	Netherlands	DNF	
64	Wout Wagtmans	Netherlands	Netherlands	DNF	
65	Victorio Ruiz García	Spain	Spain	DNF	
66	Miguel Gual	Spain	Spain	DNF	
67	Dalmacio Langarica	Spain	Spain	58	
68	Francisco Masip	Spain	Spain	59	
69	Emilio Rodríguez	Spain	Spain	DNF	
70	Manuel Rodríguez Barros	Spain	Spain	44	
71	Bernardo Ruiz	Spain	Spain	9	
72	José Serra	Spain	Spain	DNF	
73	Serge Blusson	France	France - Paris	DNF	
74	Robert Bonnaventure	France	France - Paris	DNF	
75	Louis Caput	France	France - Paris	45	
76	Jean-Louis Carle	France	France - Paris	63	
77	Robert Chapatte	France	France - Paris	DNF	
78	Jean Chateau	France	France - Paris	DNF	
79	Maurice Diot	France	France - Paris	DNF	
80	Dominique Forlini	France	France - Paris	DNF	
81	Marcel Michel	France	France - Paris	DNF	
82	Roger Piel	France	France - Paris	DNF	
83	Jacques Renaud	France	France - Paris	DNF	
84	Jean Robic	France	France - Paris	27	
85	José Beyaert	France	France - Île-de-France/North-West	DNF	
86	Roger Creton	France	France - Île-de-France/North-West	DNF	
87	Jean Delahaye	France	France - Île-de-France/North-West	DNF	
88	Louis Déprez	France	France - Île-de-France/North-West	37	
89	André Labeylie	France	France - Île-de-France/North-West	46	
90	Guy Lintilhac	France	France - Île-de-France/North-West	DNF	
91	Lucien Maelfait	France	France - Île-de-France/North-West	DNF	
92	Jacques Marinelli	France	France - Île-de-France/North-West	DNF	
93	Maurice Quentin	France	France - Île-de-France/North-West	DNF	
94	Roger Queugnet	France	France - Île-de-France/North-West	DNF	
95	Attilio Redolfi	France	France - Île-de-France/North-West	DNF	
96	Gino Sciardis	France	France - Île-de-France/North-West	51	
97	Emile Baffert	France	France - East/South-East	64	
98	Gilbert Bauvin	France	France - East/South-East	8	
99	Pierre Brambilla	France	France - East/South-East	36	
100	Roger Buchonnet	France	France - East/South-East	39	
101	Robert Castellin	France	France - East/South-East	DNF	
102	Angelo Colinelli	France	France - East/South-East	53	
103	Adolphe Deledda	France	France - East/South-East	32	
104	Jean Dotto	France	France - East/South-East	23	
105	Paul Giguet	France	France - East/South-East	34	
106	Joseph Mirando	France	France - East/South-East	47	
107	Pierre Molineris	France	France - East/South-East	DNF	
108	Vincent Vitetta	France	France - East/South-East	33	
109	Armand Audaire	France	France - West/South-West	DNF	
110	Jean-Marie Cieliczka	France	France - West/South-West	DNF	
111	Pierre Cogan	France	France - West/South-West	19	
112	Robert Desbats	France	France - West/South-West	DNF	
113	Jean-Marie Goasmat	France	France - West/South-West	21	
114	Raymond Guégan	France	France - West/South-West	DNF	
115	Roger Leveque	France	France - West/South-West	30	
116	André Mahe	France	France - West/South-West	DNF	
117	Georges Meunier	France	France - West/South-West	16	
118	Joseph Morvan	France	France - West/South-West	49	
119	André Ruffet	France	France - West/South-West	DNF	
120	Roger Walkowiak	France	France - West/South-West	57	
121	Abdel-Kader Abbes	France	North Africa	DNF	
122	Max Charroin	France	North Africa	DNF	
123	Marcel Fernandez	France	North Africa	DNF	
124	Ahmed Kebaili	France	North Africa	DNF	
125	Jean Manuel Mayen	France	North Africa	65	
126	Vincent Soler	France	North Africa	DNF	
127	Abdel-Kader Zaaf	France	North Africa	66	
128	Marcel Zelasco	France	North Africa	DNF	
