= Grand Prix François Faber =

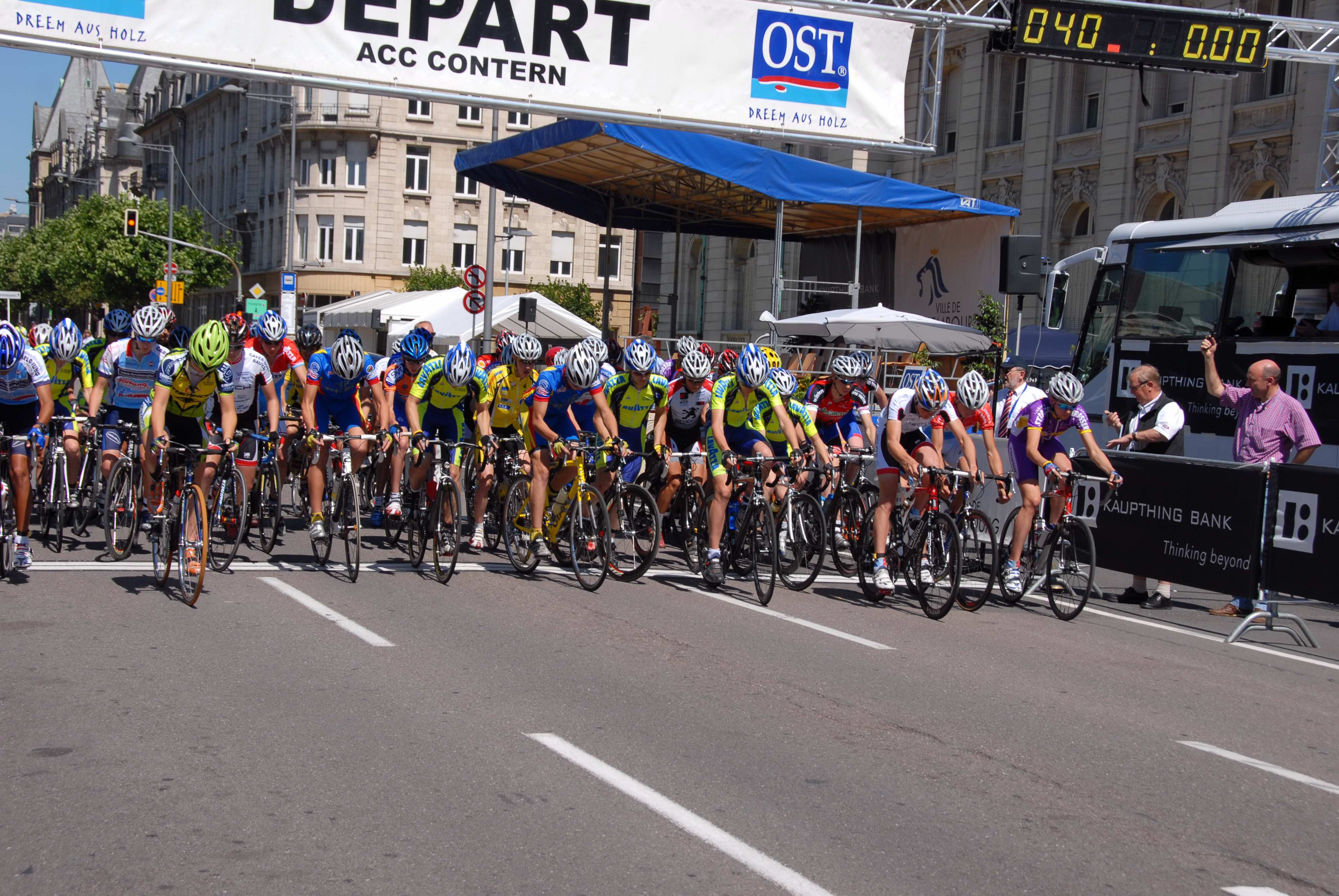
- The start of the 2007 edition

Race details
- Region: Luxembourg
- Discipline: Road
- Competition: National calendar
- Type: One-day
- Organiser: ACC Contern
- Web site: acccontern.lu

History
- First edition: 1918
- Editions: 96 (as of 2019)
- First winner: Joseph Rasqui (LUX)
- Most wins: Nicolas Frantz (LUX); Lucien Didier (LUX); (3 wins)
- Most recent: Loïc Bettendorff (LUX)

The Grand Prix François Faber is a one-day road cycling race held annually in Luxembourg since 1918. Originally held as a stage race, it was created in honor of the Luxembourg cyclist François Faber who was killed during World War I.

== Winners ==
Year	Winner	Second	Third
1918	(Luxembourg) Jos Rasqui	(Luxembourg) Mathias Thill	(Luxembourg) Felix Melchior
1919	(Belgium) Noël Hubert	(Belgium) René Vermandel	(Belgium) Charles Rosssart
1920	(Belgium) Benoit Adelin	(Belgium) Guillaume Nyssen	(Belgium) Pierre Castermans
1921	(Belgium) Maurice Depauw	(France) Pierre Corini	(Belgium) Gaston Carels
1922	(Luxembourg) Nicolas Frantz	(Belgium) Alfred Mottard	(Belgium) Maurice De Waele
1923	(Luxembourg) Nicolas Frantz	(Belgium) Marcel Clausse	(Belgium) Alfred Mottard
1924	(Belgium) Léon Briscot	(Belgium) Robert Doyen	(Luxembourg) Jempy Engel
1925	(Belgium) Charles Mondelaers	(Switzerland) Hans Kaspar	(Switzerland) Louis Krauss
1926	(Belgium) Léon Briscot	(Luxembourg) Jempy Engel	(Luxembourg) Auguste Schleck
1927	(Belgium) Constant Dyzers	(Belgium) Norbert Collin	(Luxembourg) Auguste Schleck
1928	(Belgium) Émile Joly	(Belgium) Georges Lemaire	(Belgium) Jean Hans
1929	(Luxembourg) Marcel Pesch	(Luxembourg) Gianni Graglia	(Luxembourg) Jean-Pierre Muller
1930	(Luxembourg) Nicolas Frantz	(Belgium) Gaston Rebry	(Belgium) Romain Gijssels
1931	(Italy) Carlo Zandona	(Luxembourg) Arnold Schaack	(Luxembourg) Marcel Schneider
1932	(Luxembourg) Ferd Hein	(Luxembourg) Laurent Graglia	(Luxembourg) Josy Mersch
1933	(Luxembourg) Jean Majerus	(Luxembourg) Laurent Graglia	(Luxembourg) Josy Mersch
1934	(Luxembourg) Arsène Mersch	(Luxembourg) Arnold Schaack	(Luxembourg) Jean Ferrari
1935	(Luxembourg) Paul Frantz	(Luxembourg) Auguste Moneta	(France) Jean-Paul Thilges
1936	No race		
1937	(Luxembourg) Aloyse Klensch	(Luxembourg) Christophe Didier	(Belgium) Léon Drossart
1938–1944	No race		
1945	(France) Louis Thiétard	(Luxembourg) Jeng Kirchen	(Belgium) Joseph Somers
1946	(Luxembourg) Jos Bintener	(Luxembourg) Mathias Clemens	(Luxembourg) Henri Kass
1947	(Luxembourg) Willy Kemp	(Luxembourg) Lull Gillen	–
1948	(Luxembourg) Henri Kellen	(Luxembourg) Robert Bintz	–
1949	(Luxembourg) Robert Bintz	–	–
1950	(Luxembourg) Robert Bintz	(Luxembourg) Johny Goedert	–
1951	(Luxembourg) Edy Hein	–	–
1952	(Belgium) Richard Van Genechten	–	–
1953	(Belgium) René Van Meenen	–	(Luxembourg) François Gelhausen
1954	(Netherlands) Flor Van de Weijden	–	–
1955	(Socialist Federal Republic of Yugoslavia) Riezzeri Jonjic	–	–
1956	(Luxembourg) Gaston Dumont	–	–
1957	(Belgium) Robert Seneca	–	–
1958	(Belgium) Roland Jubé	(Belgium) Émile Daems	–
1959	(Netherlands) Jan Hugens	–	–
1960	(Belgium) Achiel Van de Weyer	(Germany) Dieter Puschel	(Netherlands) Jan Hugens
1961	(Netherlands) Kees De Jongh	(Luxembourg) Raymond Jacobs	–
1962	(Belgium) Joseph Mathy		(Netherlands) Cor Schuuring
1963	(Netherlands) Gerrit De Wit	(Netherlands) Jan Pieterse	(Netherlands) Arie den Hartog
1964	(Belgium) Benoît Van Roy	(Belgium) Paul Somers	–
1965	(Netherlands) Gerard Vianen	(Luxembourg) Edy Schütz	–
1966	(Netherlands) Willy Geraeds	–	–
1967	(Belgium) Jean-Pierre Meyhi	(Luxembourg) Roger Gilson	(Netherlands) Jan Spetgens
1968	(Netherlands) Théo Van der Leeuw	(Belgium) Marc Sohet	(Belgium) Herman Vrijders
1969	(Belgium) Marc Sohet	(Netherlands) Chris Popels	(Netherlands) Théo van der Leeuw
1970	(Soviet Union) Valeri Iardy	(Soviet Union) Anatoli Starkov	(Soviet Union) Vladimir Sokolov
1971	(Soviet Union) Nikolai Dmitruk	(Soviet Union) Alexandre Gussiatnikov	(Soviet Union) Valeri Likatchev
1972	(Netherlands) Willie Wilms	(Italy) J. Clavatone	(Netherlands) Ben Koken
1973	(Luxembourg) Lucien Didier	(Luxembourg) Erny Kirchen	–
1974	(Luxembourg) Lucien Didier	–	–
1975	(Luxembourg) Lucien Didier	(Luxembourg) Marcel Thull	–
1976	(Netherlands) Huub Neven	–	–
1977	(Belgium) Dirk Heirweg	(Belgium) René Martens	(Belgium) Daniel Willems
1978	(Belgium) Etienne De Wilde	(Belgium) Claude Criquielion	(Belgium) Alfons De Wolf
1979	(Luxembourg) Eugène Urbany	–	–
1980	(Luxembourg) Francis Da Silva	(Belgium) Patrick Hermans	–
1981	(Luxembourg) Nico Ney	–	–
1982	(Netherlands) Leo Nevels	(Netherlands) Nico Verhoeven	(Netherlands) Jean-Paul van Poppel
1983	(United Kingdom) Joey McLoughlin	–	–
1984	(Denmark) Jack Olsen	(Denmark) Brian Holm	(Denmark) Jørgen Vagn Pedersen
1985	(Sweden) Roul Fahlin		(Czech Republic) Roman Kreuziger Sr.
1986	(Sweden) Lars Wahlqvist	(Germany) Hartmut Bölts	(Netherlands) Eddy Schurer
1987	(Netherlands) Gerrit de Vries	(Czechoslovakia) Josef Regec	(Netherlands) Arjan Jagt
1988	(Netherlands) Tom Cordes	(Netherlands) Arjan Jagt	(Germany) Raimund Lehnert
1989	(United Kingdom) Mark Gornall	(Luxembourg) Gerard Kramer	–
1990	(Germany) Kai Hundertmarck	(Soviet Union) Vladimir Chevtchenko	(Denmark) Bo Hamburger
1991	(Germany) Jörg Paffrath	(United States) Jim Copeland	(Germany) Kai Hundertmarck
1992	(Czechoslovakia) Vaclav Toman	(Czechoslovakia) Josef Regec	(Belgium) Olivier Vanconingsloo
1993	(Denmark) Alex Pedersen	(Netherlands) Casper vun der Meer	(France) Gilles Casadei
1994	(Latvia) Arvis Piziks	(Denmark) Michael Rosborg	(Germany) Danilo Klaar
1995	(Latvia) Juris Silovs	(Luxembourg) Pascal Triebel	(Latvia) Raivis Belohvoščiks
1996	(Poland) Dariusz Baranowski	(Latvia) Romāns Vainšteins	(Denmark) Michael Rosborg
1997	(Belgium) Erwin Vervecken	(Belgium) Rudy Verdonck	(Netherlands) Jimmy Biesmeijer
1998	(France) Gilles Riffel	(Poland) Michał Krawczyk	(Luxembourg) Fränk Schleck
1999	(Luxembourg) Kim Kirchen	(Belgium) Nico Strynckx	(Belgium) Danny Swinnen
2000	(Luxembourg) Christian Theis	(Italy) Fabio Emili	(Luxembourg) Gérard Schalk
2001	(Denmark) Jesper Agergaard	(Luxembourg) Claude Degano	(Luxembourg) Vincenzo Centrone
2002	(Luxembourg) Vincenzo Centrone	(Belgium) Frédéric Noiset	(Luxembourg) Christian Elsen
2003	(Belgium) Julien Goossens	(Luxembourg) Marc Vanacker	(Belgium) Philip Monsieur
2004	(Belgium) William Grosdent	(Luxembourg) Daniel Bintz	(Luxembourg) Christian Poos
2005	(Luxembourg) Pascal Triebel	–	–
2006	(Denmark) Morten Knudsen	(Luxembourg) Ben Gastauer	(Sweden) Fredrik Johansson
2007	(Luxembourg) Pascal Kess	(Luxembourg) Oliver Wies	(Luxembourg) Suzie Godart
2008	(Luxembourg) Pit Schlechter	–	–
2009	(Luxembourg) Christian Poos	(Luxembourg) Vincenzo Centrone	(Netherlands) Tjarco Cuppens
2010	(Luxembourg) Christian Poos	(Netherlands) Tjarco Cuppens	(Germany) Benjamin Höber
2011	(Luxembourg) Bob Jungels	(Belgium) Quentin Borcy	(Luxembourg) Tom Kohn
2012	No race		
2013	(Luxembourg) Massimo Morabito	(Belgium) Glenn Waerzeggers	(Luxembourg) Luc Turchi
2014	(Luxembourg) Kevin Geniets	(Luxembourg) Tom Wirtgen	(Luxembourg) Maxime Weyrich
2015	(Luxembourg) Kevin Geniets	(Luxembourg) Michel Ries	(France) Dylan Guinet
2016	(Luxembourg) Colin Heiderscheid	(Luxembourg) Michel Ries	(Luxembourg) Tristan Parotta
2017	(Luxembourg) Arthur Kluckers	(Luxembourg) Nicolas Kess	(Luxembourg) Gilles Kirsch
2018	(Luxembourg) Gilles Kirsch	(Luxembourg) Arthur Kluckers	(Luxembourg) Cédric Pries
2019	(Luxembourg) Loïc Bettendorff	(Belgium) Tom Paquot	(Luxembourg) Joé Michotte
