= Grand Prix Général Patton =

Race details
- Date: July
- Region: Luxembourg
- Discipline: Road race
- Competition: UCI Junior Nations' Cup
- Type: Stage race (until 2019); One-day race (2019–)

History
- First edition: 1947
- Editions: 74 (as of 2023)
- First winner: Johny Goedert (LUX)
- Most wins: Marcel Ernzer (LUX); Charly Gaul (LUX); Jukka Vastaranta (FIN); (2 wins)
- Most recent: William Graff (BEL)

The Grand Prix Général Patton is a junior (ages 17–18) road cycling race held annually in Luxembourg. It was part of the UCI Junior Nations' Cup between 2008 and 2019. Until 2019, the race was held as a stage race before being shortened to one day. The race on the second day is eversince known as Grand Prix Luxembourg.

== Winners ==
Year	Category	Winner	Second	Third
1947	Cadets	(Luxembourg) Johny Goedert	(Luxembourg) Jean-Paul Maret	(Luxembourg) Roby Bintz
1947	Cadets	(Luxembourg) Josy Besch	(Luxembourg) Albert Kirchen	(Luxembourg) Lull Gillen
1947	Amateurs	(Luxembourg) Marcel Ernzer	(Luxembourg) Willy Kemp	(Luxembourg) André Hoffmann
1947	Independent	(Luxembourg) Marcel Wang	(Luxembourg) Henri Ackermann	(Luxembourg) Roger Jacobs
1948	Débutants	(Luxembourg) Jengy Schmit	(Luxembourg) Guy Kirsch	(Luxembourg) Gusty Feyder
1948	Amateurs	(Luxembourg) Marcel Ernzer	(Luxembourg) Josy Didier	(Luxembourg) Henri Kellen
1949	Amateurs	(Luxembourg) Henri Kass	(Luxembourg) Roby Bintz	(Luxembourg) André Hoffmann
1950	Amateurs	(Luxembourg) Charly Gaul	(Luxembourg) Josy Lamesch	(Luxembourg) Jempy Schmitz
1951	Amateurs	(Luxembourg) Charly Gaul	(Italy) Renzo Accordi	(Luxembourg) Roger Ludwig
1952	Cadets	(Luxembourg) Théo Lamesch	(Luxembourg) Nico Ferrari	(Luxembourg) Nic. Kirsch
1953	Cancelled			
1954	Amateurs	(Luxembourg) Théo Simon	(Luxembourg) Norbert Jeblick	(Luxembourg) Dominique Zago
1955	Amateurs	(Luxembourg) Aldo Bolzan	(Luxembourg) Antoine Roderes	(Luxembourg) Erny Jost
1956	Amateurs	(Luxembourg) Edmond Jacobs	(Luxembourg) Théo Simon	(Luxembourg) Louis Grisius
1957	Amateurs	(Luxembourg) Erny Jost	(Luxembourg) Bruno Martinato	(Belgium) Eudore Messens
1958	Amateurs	(Belgium) Emile Daems	(Netherlands) Arie van Houwelingen	(Netherlands) Jan Hugens
1959	Amateurs	(Luxembourg) Louis Grisius	(Luxembourg) Dominique Zago	(Luxembourg) René Andring
1960	Cadets	(Luxembourg) Léon Chaussy	(Luxembourg) Jeff Bruck	(Luxembourg) Josy Mersch
1961	Cadets	(Luxembourg) Ferdy Reuland	(Luxembourg) Pierre Philippe	(Luxembourg) Léon Chaussy
1962	Cadets	(Luxembourg) Nicky Sassel	(Luxembourg) Aloyse Eischen	(Belgium) Arthur Remacle
1963	Juniors	(Belgium) Willy Day	(Luxembourg) Aloyse Eischen	(Luxembourg) Jean Sauveur
1964	Juniors	(Luxembourg) Roger Gilson	(Luxembourg) Nico Langehegermann	(Luxembourg) Nico Igel
1965	Juniors	(Luxembourg) Roland Smaniotto	(Luxembourg) Nico Folschette	(Luxembourg) Nico Christen
1966	Juniors	(Luxembourg) Robert Bischel	(Germany) Jürgen Siegel	(Belgium) René Dernoeden
1967	Juniors	(Germany) Heribert Ferring	(Luxembourg) Erny Kirchen	(Germany) Jochen Werner
1968	Juniors	(France) Michel Thouvenin	(Germany) Josef Dziuk	(Luxembourg) Nico Neyer
1969	Juniors	(Belgium) André Beullens	(Luxembourg) Nico Neyer	(Belgium) Robert Michot
1970	Juniors	(Luxembourg) Raymond Uhres	(Sweden) Bo Carlson	(Luxembourg) Nico Neyer
1971	Juniors	(Sweden) Rudi Scheler	(France) Bernard Vallet	(Belgium) René Habeaux
1972	Juniors	(Belgium) René Habeaux	(Sweden) Tommy Prim	(Sweden) Paul Wieland
1973	Juniors	(Belgium) Livio Ravagnan	(Sweden) Roland Nihlen	(Luxembourg) Fernand Jucken
1974	Juniors	(Sweden) Bengt Nymann	(Netherlands) Peter Tijssen	(Germany) Peter Billigmann
1975	Juniors	(Luxembourg) Roby Godart	(Belgium) Daniel Plummer	(Netherlands) Jos Bellemakers
1976	Juniors	(Luxembourg) Guy Greis	(Luxembourg) Pierre Everard	(Netherlands) Jos Bellemakers
1978	Juniors	(Belgium) Thierry Septon	(Luxembourg) Claude Michely	(Luxembourg) Josy Allegrini
1979	Juniors	(Netherlands) Johan Van Asten	(Germany) Hans-Werner Theisen	(Portugal) Acácio da Silva
1980	Juniors	(Sweden) Peter Stigson	(Belgium) Marc Schefers	(Belgium) Alain Mat
1981	Juniors	(Belgium) Corneille Daems	(France) Eric Stoecklin	(Netherlands) Gino Meex
1982	Juniors	(France) Michel Friedmann	(Luxembourg) Henri Schnadt	(Luxembourg) Guy Schaltz
1983	Juniors	(Germany) Andreas Merkle	(Belgium) Bruno Bruyère	(Germany) Axel Rust
1984	Juniors	(Luxembourg) Pascal Triebel	(France) Jean-Michel Lance	(Luxembourg) Olivier Triebel
1985	Juniors	(Luxembourg) Adriano Tempesta	(Luxembourg) Christian Elsen	(Germany) Udo Thimm
1986	Juniors	(Belgium) Johan Cuypers	(Republic of Ireland) Andrew Moss	(Netherlands) Gino Jansen
1987	Juniors	(Belgium) Patrick Evenepoel	(Belgium) Igor Van den Berghe	(Republic of Ireland) Andrew Moss
1988	Juniors	(Belgium) Philip Vandevelde	(Belgium) Marc Partry	(Luxembourg) Aly Weber
1989	Juniors	(Belgium) Philippe Wirtgen	(France) Vincent Spitaleri	(France) Daniel Martinez
1990	Juniors	(Netherlands) Eric Van de Boom	(Belgium) Frédéric Noiset	(Germany) Johannes Thiel
1991	Juniors	(Belgium) Philippe Diederen	(Italy) Mauro Zanella	(Germany) Michael Bier
1992	Juniors	(Belgium) Steven Persoon	(Belgium) Rolf Verhaegen	(Italy) Eddy Dalmas
1993	Juniors	(Netherlands) Roger Van de Wal	(Netherlands) Ivan Peeters	(Netherlands) Arno Bouten
1994	Juniors	(Belgium) Jan D'Hooghe	(Belgium) Kris de Coen	(Luxembourg) Claude Entringer
1995	Juniors	(Luxembourg) Christian Poos	(Luxembourg) Claude Entringer	(Netherlands) Jos Lucassen
1996	Juniors	(Luxembourg) Kim Kirchen	(Belgium) Mike Guilliams	(Belgium) Sven Gees
1997	Juniors	(Netherlands) Vincent Van der Kooij	(Belgium) Sven Gees	(Austria) Christian Hoelzl
1998	Juniors	(Germany) Eric Baumann	(Germany) Christian Knees	(Netherlands) Jele Van Groezen
1999	Juniors	(Russia) Igor Abakoumov	(France) Samuel Ardouin	(Belgium) Frederik Pieters
2000	Juniors	(Belgium) Wim De Vocht	(Netherlands) Stefan Cohnen	(Belgium) Kevin De Weert
2001	Juniors	(Finland) Jukka Vastaranta	(Netherlands) Niels Scheuneman	(Netherlands) Johnny Hoogerland
2002	Juniors	(Finland) Jukka Vastaranta	(Slovakia) Matej Jurčo	(France) Mathieu Perget
2003	Juniors	(France) Mikaël Cherel	(Switzerland) Michael Schär	(Belgium) Pieter Jacobs
2004	Juniors	(Slovenia) Simon Špilak	(Netherlands) Sjoerd Commandeur	(Belgium) Wim Van Hoolst
2005	Juniors	(Denmark) Thomas Vedel Kvist	(Denmark) André Steensen	(Denmark) Thomas Guldhammer
2006	Juniors	(Belgium) Gert Dockx	(Germany) David Hesselbarth	(Denmark) Rasmus Guldhammer
2007	Juniors	(France) Dimitri Le Boulch	(Norway) Ole Haavardsholm	(France) Thomas Bonnin
2008	Juniors	(Denmark) Sebastian Lander	(Australia) Michael Matthews	(Belgium) Thomas Sprengers
2009	Juniors	(Czech Republic) Jan Hirt	(Netherlands) Barry Markus	(Denmark) Michael Valgren
2010	Juniors	(France) Olivier Le Gac	(Australia) Jay McCarthy	(Australia) Damien Howson
2011	Juniors	(France) Adrien Legros	(Netherlands) Ivar Slik	(Slovenia) Matej Mohorič
2012	Juniors	(France) Quentin Jaurégui	(Germany) Silvio Herklotz	(Netherlands) Lennard Hofstede
2013	Juniors	(Denmark) Christoffer Lisson	(Netherlands) Mathieu van der Poel	(Austria) Alexander Wachter
2014	Juniors	(Russia) Aleksandr Vlasov	(France) Valentin Madouas	(Italy) Lorenzo Fortunato
2015	Juniors	(Switzerland) Marc Hirschi	(Germany) Georg Zimmermann	(Belgium) Bjorg Lambrecht
2016	Juniors	(Denmark) Andreas Kron	(France) Tanguy Turgis	(Switzerland) Marc Hirschi
2017	Juniors	(Italy) Michele Gazzoli	(Slovakia) Matej Blasko	(Switzerland) Mauro Schmid
2018	Juniors	(Belgium) Remco Evenepoel	(Italy) Mattia Petrucci	(Belgium) Xandres Vervloesem
2019	Juniors	(Germany) Marco Brenner	(France) Hugo Toumire	(Germany) Maurice Ballerstedt
2020–2021	Cancelled			
2022	Juniors	(Belgium) Jarno Widar	(Denmark) Kevin Biehl	(Belgium) Tyson Borremans
2023	Juniors	(Belgium) William Graff	(Australia) Joshua Cranage	(Belgium) Lars Vanden Heede
