= Lintilhac =

Lintilhac is a surname. Notable people with the surname include:

- Guy Lintilhac (1927–2014), French racing cyclist
- Philip M. Lintilhac (born 1940), American botanist
