= 1949 UCI Road World Championships =

- Venue: Copenhagen, Denmark
- Date: 20–21 August 1949
- Coordinates: 55°40′N 12°34′E
- Events: 2

The 1949 UCI Road World Championships was the 22nd edition of the UCI Road World Championships.

It took place in Copenhagen, Denmark between 20–21 August 1949.

Dutchman Henk Faanhof became world champion among the amateurs on Saturday. He defeated his fellow escapee Henri Kass from Luxembourg in the sprint.

Belgian Rik Van Steenbergen won his first world title among the professionals. He defeated the Swiss Ferdi Kübler and the Italian Fausto Coppi in a sprint with three.

Following the road world championships, the 1949 UCI Track Cycling World Championships took place in the Ordrup velodrome, near Copenhagen, from 22 to 28 August 1949.

== Events Summary ==
Event	Gold		Silver		Bronze	
Men's Events
Professional Road Race	Rik Van Steenbergen; Belgium	7h 34' 44"	Ferdinand Kübler; Switzerland	s.t.	Fausto Coppi; Italy	s.t.
Amateur Road Race	Henk Faanhof; Netherlands	-	Henri Kass; Luxembourg	-	Hub Vinken; Netherlands	-

== See also ==
- 1949 UCI Track Cycling World Championships
