= Ronde van Limburg =

The Tour of Limburg may refer to:

- Ronde van Limburg (Belgium), a cycling race in Limburg, Belgium
- Ronde van Limburg (Netherlands), a cycling race in South Limburg, Netherlands
