= Polfer =

Polfer is a surname. Notable people with the surname include:

- Camille Polfer (1924–1983), Luxembourgish politician and teacher
- Josy Polfer (1929–1976), Luxembourgish racing cyclist
- Lydie Polfer (born 1952), Luxembourgish politician
