= Tom Flammang =

Luxembourgish cyclist and sports administrator

Personal information
- Born: 12 January 1978 (age 48) Esch-sur-Alzette, Luxembourg

Cycling career
- Sport: Cycling
- Disciplines: Road; Cyclo-cross
- Role: Rider; Directeur sportif

Amateur teams
- 2009: UC Dippach
- 2010–?: LG Bertrange

Professional teams
- 2000–2003: Cofidis
- 2006: Team Sparkasse

Managerial team
- 2014–2018: Leopard Development Team

Tom Flammang (born 12 January 1978) is a Luxembourgish former cyclist, who competed as a professional from 2000 to 2003 and in 2006. He also worked as a directeur sportif for the UCI Continental team Leopard Development Team from 2014 to 2018.

== Major results ==
1998
1st Road race, National Road Championships
1999
3rd Overall Arden Challenge

1st Stage 2

2000
5th Grand Prix de la Ville de Lillers
2001
8th Kampioenschap van Vlaanderen
10th Overall Guldensporentweedaagse
2005
1st Stage 4 Flèche du Sud
2nd Road race, Games of the Small States of Europe
2006
6th Overall Flèche du Sud

1st Stage 1

2008
1st Stage 3 Flèche du Sud

=== Cyclo-cross ===
1995–1996
2nd National Junior Championships
1998–1999
3rd National Under-23 Championships
2003–2004
1st National Championships
2004–2005
1st Cyclo-cross de Cessange
2nd National Championships
2008–2009
3rd National Championships
2013–2014
2nd National Championships
