= Thomas Bonnin =

French cyclist

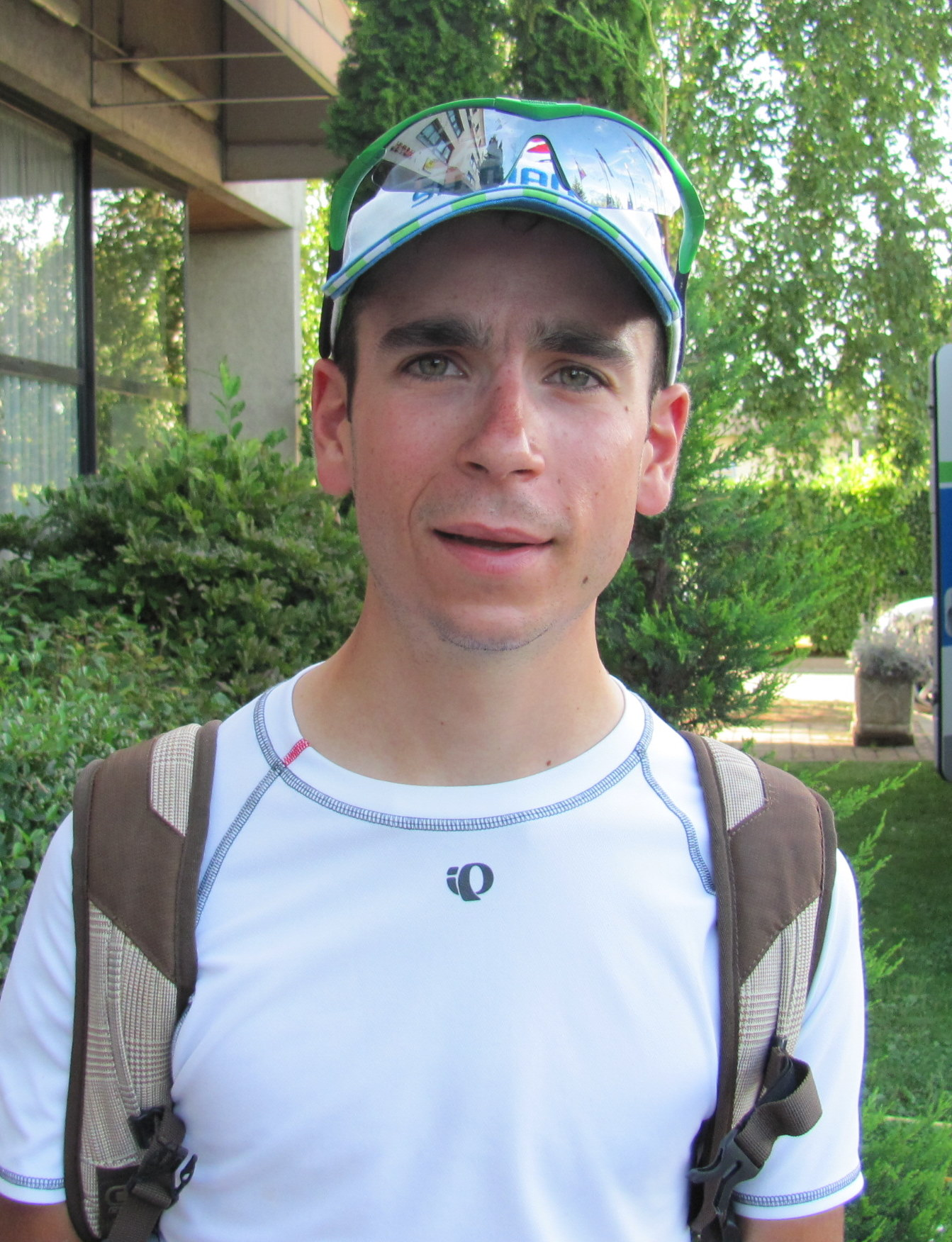

Personal information
- Born: 10 May 1989 (age 37) Orléans, France

Cycling career
- Sport: Cycling
- Current team: Retired
- Discipline: Road
- Role: Rider

Professional teams
- 2010: AG2r–La Mondiale (stagiaire)
- 2011–2012: Skil–Shimano
- 2013: Team NSP–Ghost

Thomas Bonnin (born 10 May 1989 in Orléans) is a French racing cyclist.

== Palmares ==
2006
3rd La Bernaudeau Juniors
2007
2nd La Bernaudeau Juniors
3rd Overall GP Général Patton
3rd Overall La Coupe du Président de la Ville de Grudziądz
9th Overall Route de l'Avenir-Souvenir Louis Caput
2008
4th Overall Ronde de l'Isard
2010
1st Stage 4 Giro della Valle d'Aosta
2nd Overall Tour des Pays de Savoie
7th Overall Tour de l'Avenir
