= Ronde van Limburg (Netherlands) =

Dutch single-day bicycle road race

Race details
- Date: Mid-June
- Region: South Limburg, Netherlands
- English name: Tour of Limburg
- Local name: Ronde van Limburg (in Dutch)
- Discipline: Road
- Type: Single-day
- Web site: www.rondevanlimburg.nl

History
- First edition: 1948; 78 years ago
- Editions: 71 (as of 2024)
- First winner: Evert Grift (NED)
- Most wins: 2 riders (2 wins)
- Most recent: Jarno Widar (BEL)

The Ronde van Limburg is a single-day bicycle road race held annually in and around Stein, in the Dutch region of South Limburg.

== Winners ==
Year	Country	Rider	Team
1948	Netherlands	Evert Grift	
1949	No race		
1950	Netherlands	Wim Dielissen	
1951	Netherlands	Fons Jacobs	
1952	Netherlands	Hein Gelissen	
1953	Netherlands	Frans Mahn	
1954	Netherlands	Martin van den Borgh	
1955	Netherlands	Michel Stolker	
1956	Netherlands	Gerard Vergooszen	
1957	Netherlands	Wim Gramser	
1958	Netherlands	Piet Rentmeester	
1959	Germany	Rolf Wolfshohl	
1960	Netherlands	Lex van Kreuningen	
1961	Netherlands	Jan Janssen	
1962	Netherlands	Gerben Karstens	
1963	Netherlands	Leo van Dongen	
1964	Netherlands	Jan Tummers	
1965	Netherlands	Eef Dolman	
1966	Netherlands	Harrie Steevens	
1967	Netherlands	Henk Nieuwkamp	
1968	Netherlands	Jan Krekels	
1969	Netherlands	Chris Pepels	
1970	Netherlands	Fedor den Hertog	
1971	Netherlands	Henk Poppe	
1972	Netherlands	Piet van Katwijk	
1973	Netherlands	Mathieu Dohmen	
1974	Netherlands	Mathieu Dohmen	
1975	Netherlands	Henk Lubberding	
1976	Netherlands	Piet van Kollenburg	
1977	Netherlands	Leo van Vliet	
1978	Netherlands	Toon van der Steen	
1979	Netherlands	Jacques van Meer	
1980	Netherlands	Peter Damen	
1981	Netherlands	Jos Hannen	
1982	Netherlands	Johan Lammerts	
1983	Netherlands	Gert Jakobs	
1984	Netherlands	Han Vaanhold	
1985	Netherlands	René Beuker	
1986	Netherlands	Stephan Räkers	
1987	Netherlands	Arjan Jagt	
1988	Netherlands	Louis de Koning	
1989	Netherlands	Richard Luppes	
1990	Netherlands	Erik Knuvers	
1991	Netherlands	Rinus Ansems	
1992	Netherlands	Marcel van de Vliet	
1993	Netherlands	Kestitus Stakenas	
1994	Belgium	Raymond Thebes	
1995	Netherlands	Niels van de Steen	
1996	Netherlands	Louis de Koning	
1997	Netherlands	John van den Akker	
1998	Netherlands	Matthé Pronk	
1999	Germany	Michael Schlickau	
2000	Belgium	Erwin Thijs	
2001	Netherlands	Cees Jeurissen	
2002	Netherlands	David Orvalho	
2003	No race		
2004	Netherlands	Sebastian Langeveld	
2005	Netherlands	Thom van Dulmen	
2006	Netherlands	Joost van Leijen	
2007	Netherlands	Wim Botman	
2008	Netherlands	Johnny Hoogerland	
2009	Netherlands	Thijs Al	
2010	Netherlands	Maarten De Jonge	
2011	Netherlands	Ramon Sinkeldam	
2012	Netherlands	Bart van Haren	
2013	No race		
2014	Netherlands	Peter Schulting	
2015	Netherlands	Jochem Hoekstra	
2016	Netherlands	Martijn Budding	Rabobank Development Team
2017	Netherlands	Jarno Gmelich Meijling	Metec–TKH
2018	Netherlands	Rick Ottema	
2019	Belgium	Brecht Stas	Home Solutions–Soenens
2020–2021	No race		
2022	Netherlands	Jaap Roelen	Metec–Solarwatt p/b Mantel
2023	No race		
2024	Belgium	Jarno Widar	Lotto–Dstny Development Team
