= Gusty Bausch =

Luxembourgish cyclist

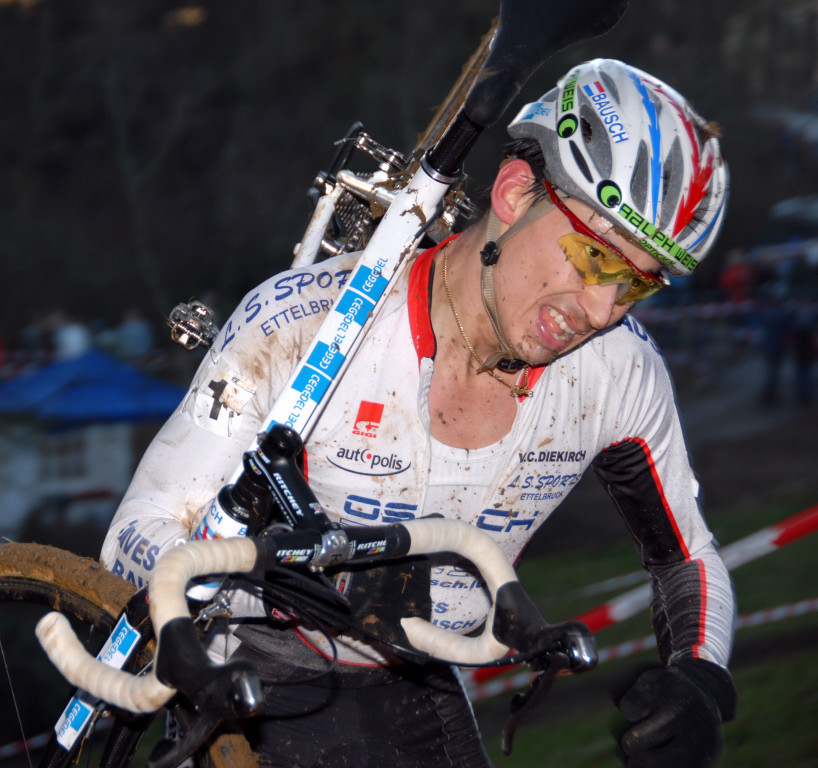
- Gusty Bausch, 2008

Personal information
- Full name: Gustave Pierre Nicolas Bausch
- Born: 25 February 1980 (age 46) Brouch, Boevange-sur-Attert, Luxembourg

Cycling career
- Sport: Cycling
- Disciplines: Cyclo-cross; Road
- Role: Rider

Gusty Bausch (born 25 February 1980) is a Luxembourgish cyclo-cross cyclist. He represented his nation in the men's elite event at the 2016 UCI Cyclo-cross World Championships in Heusden-Zolder.

== Major results ==
1997–1998
1st National Junior Championships
2000–2001
1st National Under-23 Championships
2nd National Championships
2001–2002
1st National Under-23 Championships
2002–2003
1st National Championships
2004–2005
1st National Championships
3rd Grand Prix Max Point
2005–2006
2nd National Championships
2006–2007
1st National Championships
2007–2008
2nd National Championships
3rd G.P. GEBA Sarl
2008–2009
1st National Championships
2009–2010
2nd National Championships
3rd Grand Prix DAF
2010–2011
2nd National Championships
2011–2012
1st National Championships
2014–2015
2nd National Championships
2015–2016
2nd National Championships
2016–2017
3rd National Championships
2017–2018
2nd National Championships
2018–2019
2nd National Championships
