= Mats Wenzel =

Luxembourgish cyclist (born 2002)

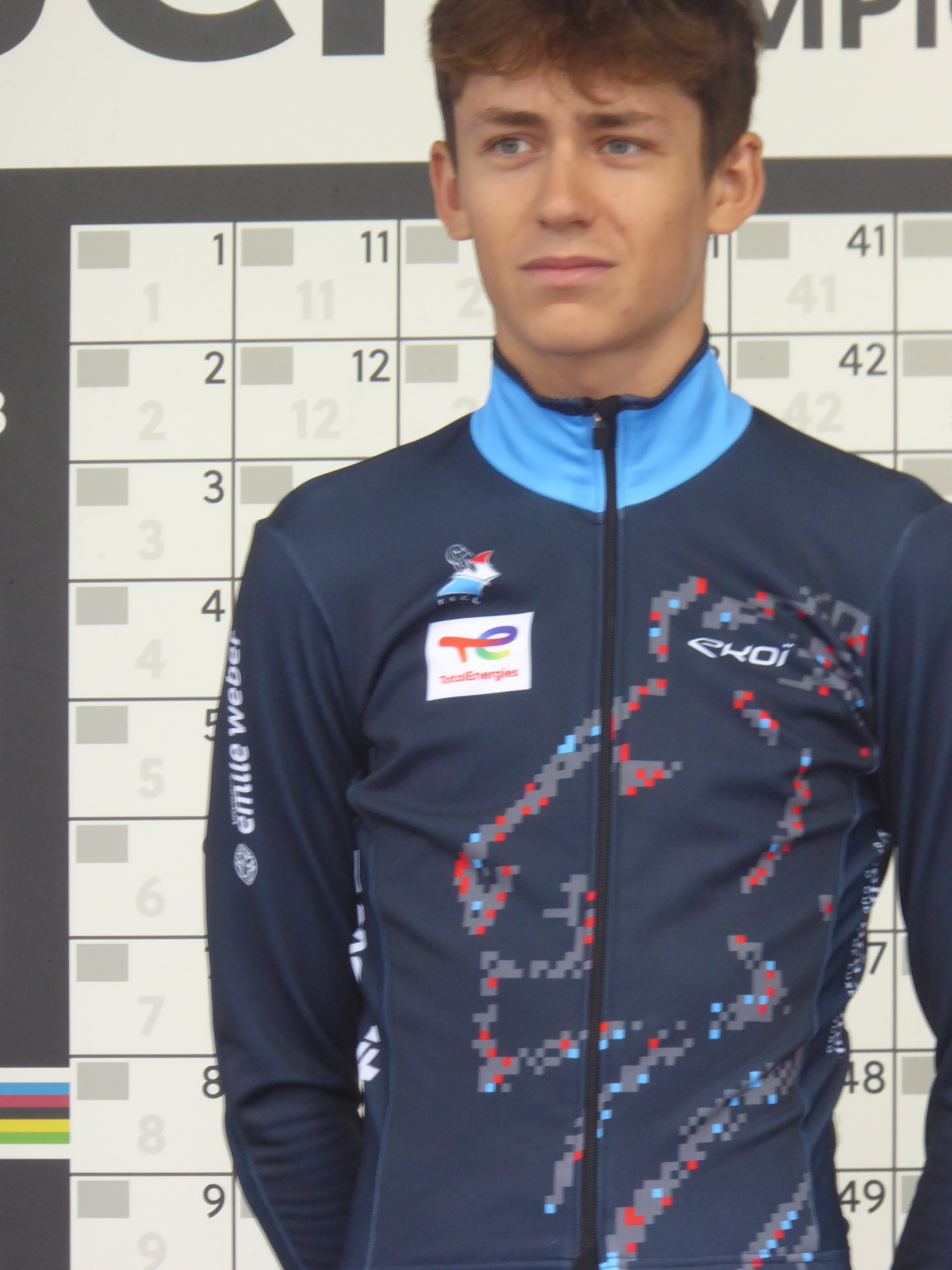
- Wenzel in 2023

Personal information
- Born: 19 December 2002 (age 23) Luxembourg

Cycling career
- Sport: Cycling
- Current team: Equipo Kern Pharma
- Disciplines: Road; Cyclo-cross
- Role: Rider

Professional teams
- 2021–2023: Leopard Pro Cycling
- 2024: Lidl–Trek Future Racing
- 2025–: Equipo Kern Pharma
Medal record
Representing Luxembourg
Men's road cycling
Games of the Small States of Europe
Gold medal – first place	Andorra la Vella 2025	Road race
Gold medal – first place	Andorra la Vella 2025	Team road race
Bronze medal – third place	Andorra la Vella 2025	Time trial

Mats Wenzel (born 19 December 2002) is a Luxembourgish road and cyclo-cross cyclist, who currently rides for UCI ProTeam Equipo Kern Pharma.

== Major results ==
=== Road ===
2019
National Junior Championships

3rd Road race
4th Time trial

2020
National Junior Championships

1st Time trial
4th Road race

2021
National Under-23 Championships

4th Time trial
5th Road race

2022
National Under-23 Championships

2nd Time trial
3rd Road race

5th Road race, National Championships
2023
1st Mountains classification, Tour de Luxembourg
National Under-23 Championships

2nd Time trial
3rd Road race

3rd Road race, National Championships
2024
National Under-23 Championships

1st Time trial
1st Road race

2nd Road race, National Championships
4th Road race, European Under-23 Championships
8th Overall Flèche du Sud
8th Overall Giro Next Gen
9th Overall Tour de l'Avenir
10th Overall Tour de Luxembourg
2025
3rd Flèche Ardennaise
National Championships

9th Time trial
9th Road race

10th Overall Arctic Race of Norway
2026
1st Clásica de Pascua
2nd Overall Flèche du Sud
National Championships

3rd Road race
4th Time trial

=== Cyclo-cross ===
2018–2019
3rd National Junior Championships
2019–2020
1st National Junior Championships
2021–2022
2nd National Under-23 Championships
2022–2023
1st National Championships
2023–2024
1st National Under-23 Championships
