= Hub Vinken =

Dutch cyclist

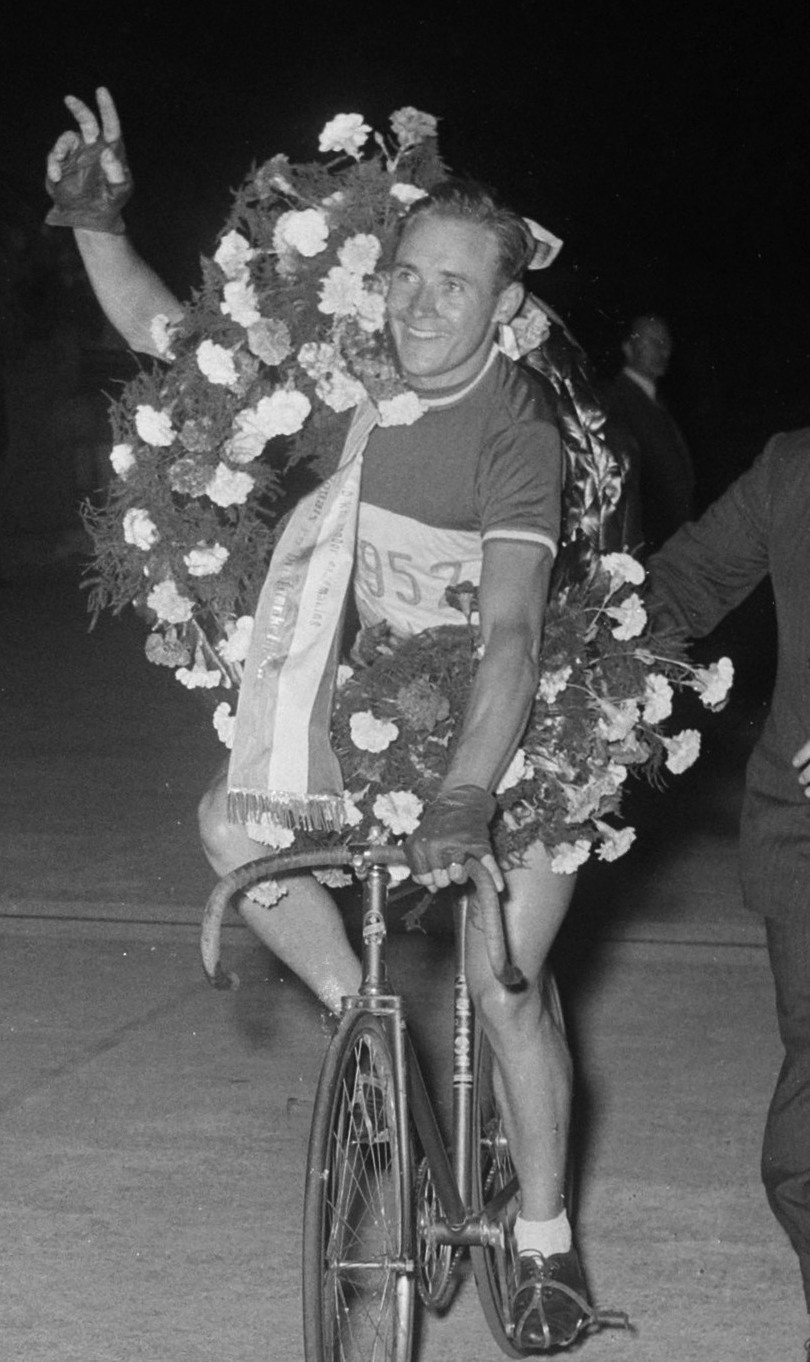
- Hub Vinken in 1952

Personal information
- Born: 16 April 1926 Heerlen, the Netherlands
- Died: 30 March 2010 (aged 83) Sittard-Geleen, the Netherlands

Sport
- Sport: Cycling
Medal record
Representing the Netherlands
Road World Championships
Bronze medal – third place	1949 Copenhagen	Road race, amateurs

Hub Vinken (16 April 1926 – 30 March 2010) was a Dutch road cyclist. He won a bronze medal in the road race at the 1949 UCI Road World Championships. Next year he turned professional and won one stage of the Ronde van Nederland in 1951. He retired in 1953.
