= Joop Harmans =

Dutch cyclist (1921–2015)

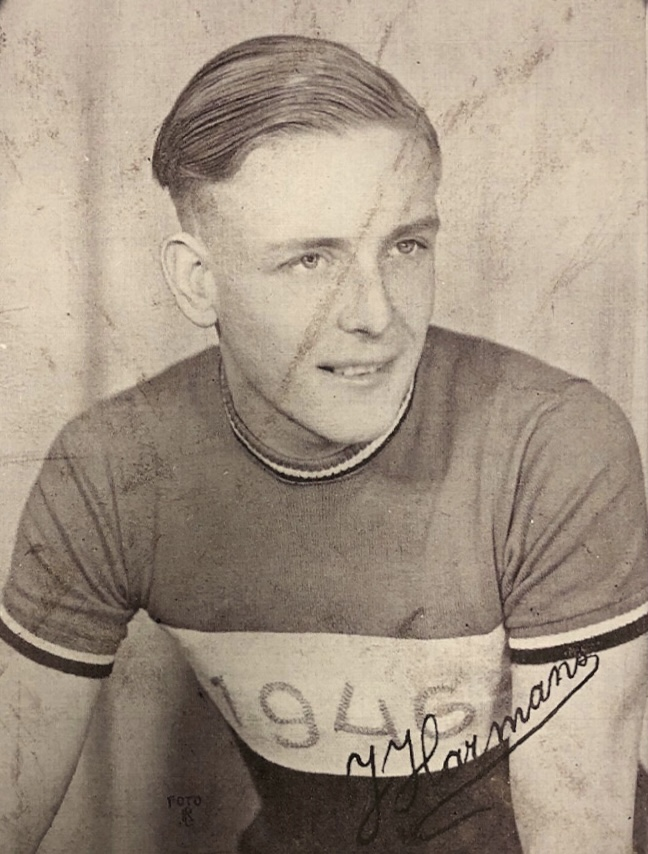

Personal information
- Born: 29 October 1921 Amsterdam, Netherlands
- Died: 2 February 2015 (aged 93) Amsterdam, Netherlands

Cycling career
- Sport: Cycling

Johannes Jozephus Franciscus "Joop" Harmans (29 October 1921 – 2 February 2015) was a Dutch cyclist who competed at the 1948 Summer Olympics in London, where he was eliminated alongside his national squad in the first round of the men's team pursuit. He was born in Amsterdam and became Dutch national champion in the 50 km event in 1946. Following his Olympic appearance he worked as the manager of a bicycle factory and later opened his own shop in Amsterdam. He died on 2 February 2015, within a week of two other members of the Dutch men's team pursuit squad, Henk Faanhof and Gerrit Voorting.

== See also ==
- List of Dutch Olympic cyclists
