= Josy Kraus =

Luxembourgish cyclist

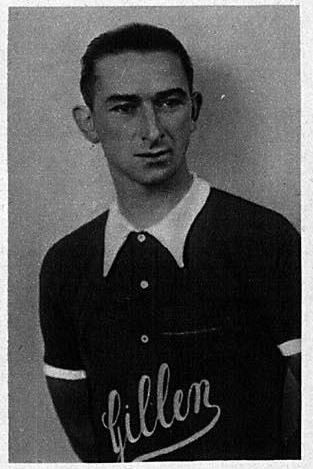

Personal information
- Born: 11 December 1908
- Died: 8 December 2001 (aged 92)

Cycling career
- Sport: Cycling
- Discipline: Road
- Role: Rider

Josy Kraus (11 December 1908 – 8 December 2001) was a Luxembourgish racing cyclist. He rode in the 1936 Tour de France.
