= Abdel-Kader Abbes =

Algerian cyclist (1914–1995)

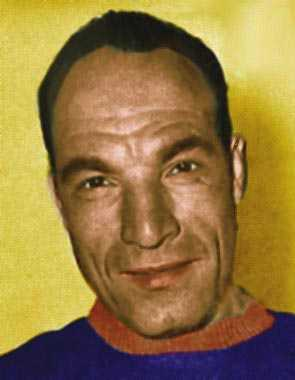

Personal information
- Born: 14 March 1914 Aïn Defla, Algeria
- Died: 22 March 1995 (aged 81)

Cycling career
- Sport: Cycling
- Role: Rider

Abdel-Kader Abbes (14 March 1914 – 22 March 1995) was an Algerian racing cyclist. He rode in the 1951 Tour de France.
