= Christian Helmig =

Luxembourgish cyclo-cross cyclist

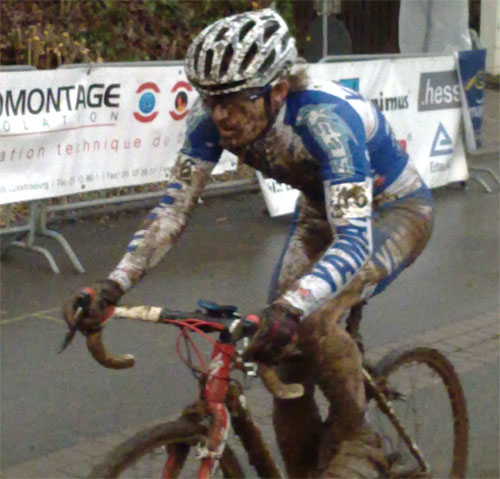
- Helmig in 2012

Personal information
- Born: 17 May 1981 (age 45)

Cycling career
- Sport: Cycling
- Disciplines: Cyclo-cross, Road, Mountain bike
- Role: Rider

Amateur team
- 2016: LC Tétange

Professional team
- 2013–2015: Differdange–Losch

Christian Helmig (born 17 May 1981) is a Luxembourgish cyclo-cross cyclist. He competed in the men's elite event at the 2016 UCI Cyclo-cross World Championships.

== Major results ==
=== Cyclo-cross ===
2011–2012
2nd National Cyclo-cross Championships
2012–2013
1st National Cyclo-cross Championships
1st Grand Prix GEBA
2013–2014
1st National Cyclo-cross Championships
1st Grand Prix GEBA
2014–2015
1st National Cyclo-cross Championships
2015–2016
1st National Cyclo-cross Championships

=== Road ===
2010
4th Overall Vuelta Independencia Nacional
2011
4th National Road Race Championships
2012
3rd National Time Trial Championships
2013
3rd Time trial, Games of the Small States of Europe

=== Mountain Bike ===
2013
1st Cross-country, Games of the Small States of Europe
1st National Cross-country Championships
2014
1st National Cross-country Championships
1st National Cross-country Marathon Championships
2015
1st National Cross-country Championships
1st National Cross-country Marathon Championships
2016
1st National Cross-country Eliminator Championships
1st National Enduro Championships
