= Harrie Schoenmakers =

Dutch cyclist

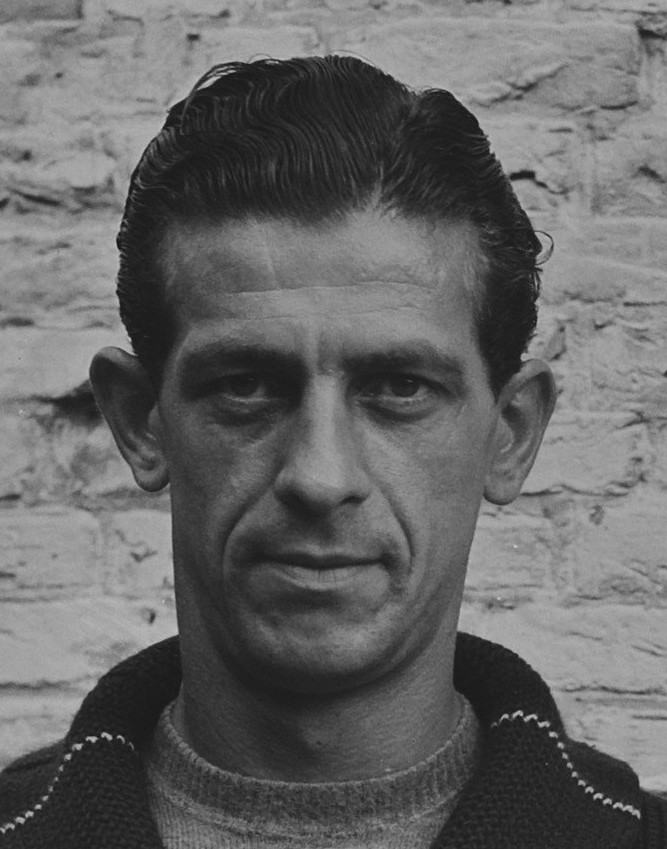

Personal information
- Born: 18 January 1916
- Died: 18 January 1999 (aged 83)

Cycling career
- Sport: Cycling
- Role: Rider

Harrie Schoenmakers (18 January 1916 – 18 January 1999) was a Dutch racing cyclist. He rode in the 1951 Tour de France.
