= Charles Krier =

Luxembourgish cyclist

Personal information
- Born: 16 September 1902
- Died: 14 December 1942 (aged 40)

Cycling career
- Sport: Cycling
- Discipline: Road
- Role: Rider

Charles Krier (16 September 1902 – 14 December 1942) was a Luxembourgish racing cyclist. He rode in the 1925 Tour de France.
