= Marcel Michel =

French cyclist

Personal information
- Born: 18 April 1926
- Died: 9 May 1981 (aged 55)

Cycling career
- Sport: Cycling
- Role: Rider

Marcel Michel (18 April 1926 – 9 May 1981) was a French racing cyclist. He rode in the 1951 Tour de France.
