= Philip M. Lintilhac =

American botanist

- Born: Shanghai, China
- Education: University of Vermont; University of California, Berkeley
- Known for: Cell biology Cell biophysics Plant morphology
- Awards: Botanical Society of America Centennial Award (2006)
- Scientific career
- Fields: Botany
- Workplaces: University of Vermont

Philip Malcolm Lintilhac (born March 12, 1940) is an American botanist and cell biologist currently serving as a research associate professor at the University of Vermont. He is known for his research on plant developmental biomechanics and plant tissue architecture.

In 2006, Lintilhac received the Centennial Award from the Botanical Society of America.

== Early life and education ==
Lintilhac was born in 1940 in Shanghai, China. He spent his early life in New York and China.

Lintilhac studied at the University of Vermont, where he earned a Bachelor of Science in botany in 1963. Later, he received his PhD from the University of California, Berkeley in 1971.

== Career ==
Lintilhac joined the University of Vermont in 1976 as a faculty member and has been working as a research professor since then. He is also the leader of the Lintilhac Foundation, which was founded by his mother, Claire Lintilhac.

== Research ==
Lintilhac's research focuses on plant cell biology, specifically cell and tissue growth and differentiation. He investigates the biophysics of cell wall extension, demonstrating that plant growth primarily occurs through cell enlargement driven by cycles of turgor pressure, wall tension, and stress relaxation, rather than by cell division. Along with Chunfang Wei, he developed a new framework to better understand this growth mechanism, improving upon existing models.

Lintilhac's early research focused on the microscopic ultrastructure of photosynthetic chloroplasts. He found that chlorophyll is bound to the chloroplast membranes rather than being dissolved in solution. This observation suggested that the light-harvesting reactions of photosynthesis occur through solid-state energy transfer instead of an unidentified solution chemistry process.

In studying cell wall stability, Lintilhac proposes a model that likens cell growth to thin-walled pressure vessels. The model suggests that as internal pressure increases, the cell wall reaches a critical tension and yields, facilitating growth. This approach explains the abrupt cessation of growth when turgor pressure decreases slightly and offers insights into the growth patterns of multicellular tissues. Lintilhac has also investigated the origin of the reproductive germ line in land plants. His research suggests that the inducing stimulus for reproductive differentiation in land plants is based on the structure and mechanics of the sporangia, rather than on biochemical signaling through morphogens.

Additionally, Lintilhac studies how plants differentiate reproductive cells from somatic cells without a maintained germ line. His research suggests that the mechanical and structural properties of plant tissues trigger reproductive cell differentiation. He focuses on the sporangium in plant reproductive development, using microscopy to map its early development in the water fern Ceratopteris.

== Personal life ==
Philip married Crea Lintilhac in 1983 at the Stowe Community Church. They have three children.

== Selected publications ==
- Philip M. Lintilhac and R. B. Park (1 March 1966). "Localization of chlorophyll in spinach chloroplast lamellae by fluorescence microscopy". Journal of Cell Biology. 28 (3): 582–585. doi:10.1083/jcb.28.3.582. PMC 2106946. PMID 5960813.
- Lintilhac, Philip M.; Wei, Chunfang; Tanguay, Jason J.; Outwater, John O. (March 2000). "Ball Tonometry: A Rapid, Nondestructive Method for Measuring Cell Turgor Pressure in Thin-Walled Plant Cells". Journal of Plant Growth Regulation. 19 (1): 90–97. doi:10.1007/s003440000009. PMID 11010995.
- Wei, Chunfang; Lintilhac, Philip M. (October 2003). "Loss of stability—a new model for stress relaxation in plant cell walls". Journal of Theoretical Biology. 224 (3): 305–312. Bibcode:2003JThBi.224..305W. doi:10.1016/S0022-5193(03)00167-X. PMID 12941589.
- Grasso, Matthew S.; Lintilhac, Philip M. (May 13, 2016). "Microbead encapsulation of living plant protoplasts: A new tool for the handling of single plant cells". Applications in Plant Sciences. 4 (5). doi:10.3732/apps.1500140. PMC 4873273. PMID 27213126.
- Lintilhac, Philip M. (October 14, 2024). "Mechanics of reproductive differentiation in the land plants: a paradigm shift?". Frontiers in Plant Science. 15. doi:10.3389/fpls.2024.1445582. PMC 11513301. PMID 39469058.
