= Roger Gilson =

Luxembourgish cyclist

Personal information
- Born: 19 September 1947 Dudelange, Luxembourg
- Died: 18 January 1995 (aged 47) Schouweiler, Luxembourg

Cycling career
- Sport: Cycling
- Discipline: Road
- Role: Rider

Professional teams
- 1969: Sonolor–Lejeune
- 1969: Frimatic–Viva–de Gribaldy
- 1972–1975: Rokado–Colders
- 1976: Frisol–Gazelle
- 1977: Gios–Torino
- 1978: Dom Kolsch
- 1980: Rauler–Gipiemme

Major wins
- Grand Tours Vuelta a España 1 individual stage (1976) One-day races and Classics National Road Race Championships (1972, 1974–1976)

Roger Gilson (19 September 1947 – 18 January 1995) was a Luxembourgish cyclist. He competed in the individual road race at the 1968 Summer Olympics.

== Major results ==
1964
1st Overall Grand Prix Général Patton
1965
1st Road race, National Junior Road Championships
1966
1st Stage 2 Grand Prix François Faber
1967
1st Overall Flèche du Sud

1st Stage 2

2nd Overall Grand Prix François Faber
1968
3rd Overall Flèche du Sud
9th Overall Tour de l'Avenir
1969
1st Overall Flèche du Sud
2nd Road race, National Road Championships
4th Overall Tour de Luxembourg
1970
1st Stage 1 Route de France
9th Overall Tour de Luxembourg
1972
1st Road race, National Road Championships
8th Overall Tour du Nord
1973
2nd Road race, National Road Championships
6th Overall Tour de Luxembourg
7th Rund um den Henninger Turm
8th Züri-Metzgete
1974
1st Road race, National Road Championships
1975
1st Road race, National Road Championships
6th Overall Tour de Luxembourg
1976
1st Road race, National Road Championships
1st Stage 2 Vuelta a España
10th Overall Tour de Luxembourg
1977
3rd Overall Tour d'Indre-et-Loire
