= Pitty Scheer =

Luxembourgish cyclist

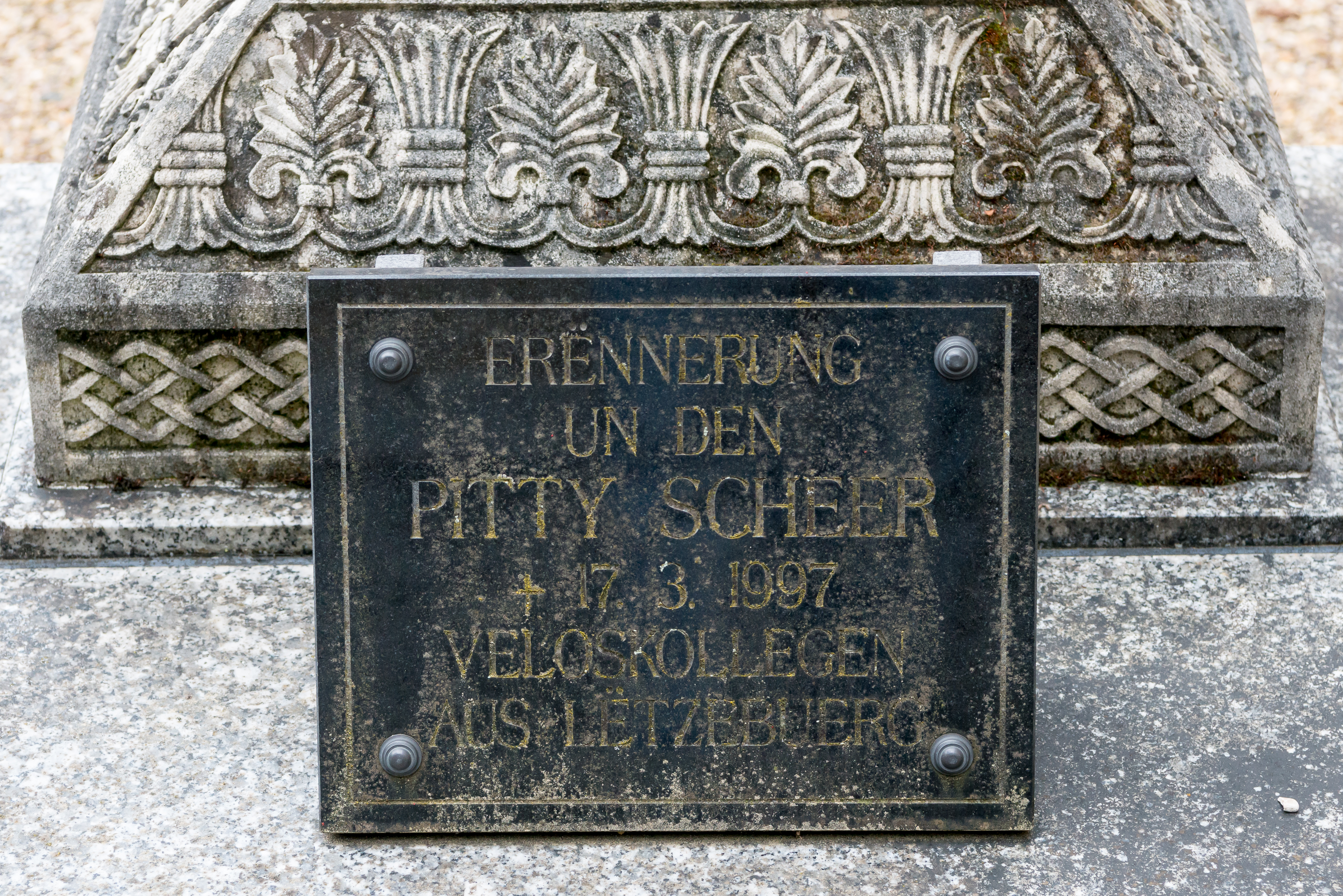
- A memorial to Pitty Scheer at the cemetery in Weimeschkierch.

Personal information
- Born: 7 December 1925
- Died: 17 March 1997 (aged 71)

Cycling career
- Sport: Cycling

Pitty Scheer (7 December 1925 – 17 March 1997) was a Luxembourgish cyclist. He competed in the individual and team road race events at the 1948 Summer Olympics.
