= Jean Schmit (cyclist) =

Luxembourgish cyclist (1931–2010)

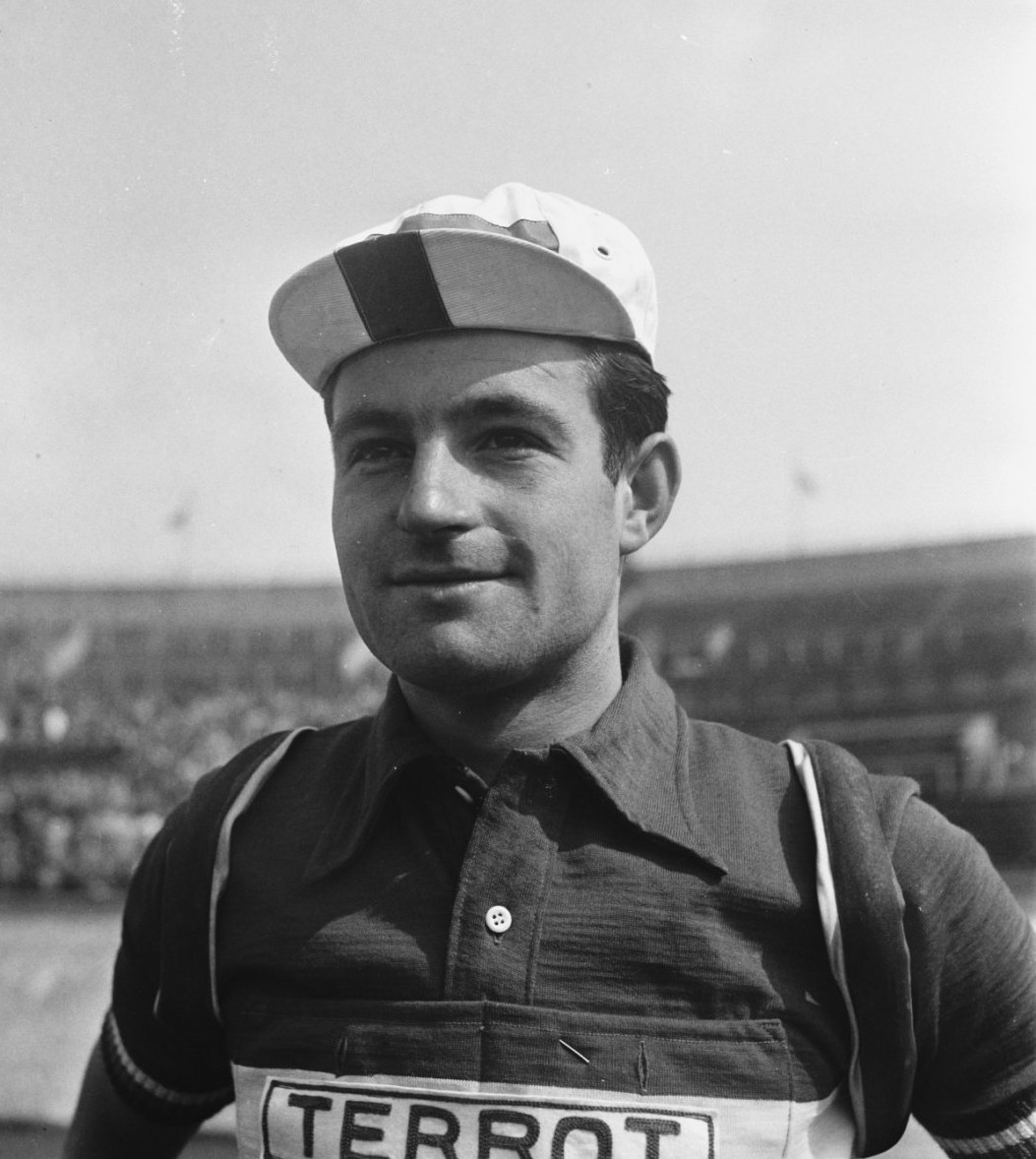
- Schmit in 1954

Personal information
- Born: 9 August 1931 Dudelange, Luxembourg
- Died: 28 October 2010 (aged 79) Dudelange, Luxembourg

Cycling career
- Sport: Cycling

Jean Schmit (9 August 1931 – 28 October 2010) was a Luxembourgish cyclist. He competed in the individual and team road race events at the 1952 Summer Olympics.
