= Jean Chateau =

French cyclist

Personal information
- Born: 11 December 1926 Paris, France
- Died: 26 May 2018 (aged 91)

Cycling career
- Sport: Cycling
- Role: Rider

Jean Chateau (11 December 1926 – 26 May 2018) was a French racing cyclist. He rode in the 1951 Tour de France.
