= Vincent Dias dos Santos =

Luxembourgish cyclist

Vincent Dias Dos Santos
Personal information
- Born: 18 December 1990 (age 35)

Cycling career
- Sport: Cycling
- Current team: LC Tétange
- Discipline: Cyclo-cross
- Role: Rider

Amateur team
- LC Tétange

Vincent Dias Dos Santos (born 18 December 1990) is a Luxembourgish cyclo-cross cyclist. He represented his nation in the men's elite event at the 2016 UCI Cyclo-cross World Championships.

== Major results ==
2007–2008
1st Junior National Cyclo-cross Championships
2014–2015
3rd National Cyclo-cross Championships
2017–2018
3rd National Cyclo-cross Championships
2018–2019
1st National Cyclo-cross Championships
