= Angelo Colinelli =

French cyclist

Personal information
- Born: 31 January 1925
- Died: 29 April 2011 (aged 86)

Cycling career
- Sport: Cycling
- Role: Rider

Angelo Colinelli (31 January 1925 – 29 April 2011) was a French racing cyclist. He rode in the 1951 Tour de France.
