= Pierre Corini =

Italian cyclist

Personal information
- Born: 14 February 1887

Cycling career
- Sport: Cycling
- Discipline: Road
- Role: Rider

Pierre Corini (born 14 February 1887, date of death unknown) was an Italian racing cyclist. He rode in the 1926 Tour de France.
