= Alfred Mottard =

Belgian cyclist

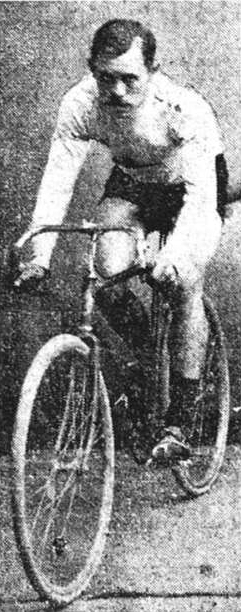

Personal information
- Born: 11 August 1892 Jemelle, Belgium
- Died: 24 January 1945 (aged 52) near Nordhausen, Nazi Germany

Cycling career
- Sport: Cycling
- Discipline: Road
- Role: Rider

Alfred Mottard (11 August 1892 – 24 January 1945) was a Belgian racing cyclist. He rode in the 1920 Tour de France. He was arrested by the Gestapo and imprisoned in Fort Breendonk and Buchenwald concentration camp before dying in Mittelbau-Dora concentration camp in 1945.
