= Jean-Louis Carle =

French cyclist

Personal information
- Born: 7 October 1925
- Died: 3 January 1975 (aged 49)

Cycling career
- Sport: Cycling
- Role: Rider

Jean-Louis Carle (7 October 1925 – 3 January 1975) was a French racing cyclist. He rode in the 1951 Tour de France.
