= Claude Michely =

Luxembourgish cyclist (1959–2023)

Personal information
- Born: 8 October 1959 Esch-sur-Alzette, Luxembourg
- Died: 1 November 2023 (aged 64)

Cycling career
- Sport: Cycling
- Current team: Retired
- Disciplines: Road; Cyclo-cross
- Role: Rider

Professional teams
- 1982–1983: Gios
- 1984: Gianni Motta–Linea M.D. Italia
- 1985: Xerox–Philadelphia Lasers
- 1986–1988: Blacky–Adia–Jelmoli
- 1989–1991: Bleiker
- 1992: Peters Sport
Medal record
Representing Luxembourg
Men's cyclo-cross
World Championships
| Bronze medal – third place | 1985 Munich | Elite race |

Claude Michely (8 October 1959 – 1 November 2023) was a Luxembourgish cyclist, who competed as a professional from 1982 to 1992. He won the Luxembourgish National Road Race Championships in 1984 and 1985, and was also a 12-time national cyclo-cross champion, having held the title continuously from 1979 to 1990. He competed in the 1985 Vuelta a España and the 1984 Giro d'Italia, but did not finish either race. He also finished third at the 1985 UCI Cyclo-cross World Championships. Michely died from a heart attack on 1 November 2023, at the age of 64.

== Major results ==
1977
2nd Road race, National Junior Road Championships
1978
1st Road race, National Junior Road Championships
1984
1st Road race, National Road Championships
1985
1st Road race, National Road Championships
1987
2nd Road race, National Road Championships
1988
2nd Road race, National Road Championships

=== Cyclo-cross ===
1979
1st National Championships
1980
1st National Championships
1981
1st National Championships
1982
1st National Championships
1983
1st National Championships
1984
1st National Championships
1985
1st National Championships
3rd UCI World Championships
1986
1st National Championships
1987
1st National Championships
1988
1st National Championships
1989
1st National Championships
1990
1st National Championships
