= Jean-Pierre Muller (cyclist) =

Luxembourgish cyclist

Personal information
- Born: 23 March 1910 Rodange, Luxembourg
- Died: 8 November 1948 (aged 38) Diekirch, Luxembourg

Cycling career
- Sport: Cycling

Jean-Pierre Muller (23 March 1910 – 8 November 1948) was a Luxembourgish cyclist. He competed in the individual and team road race events at the 1928 Summer Olympics held in Amsterdam.
