= Guy Lintilhac =

French cyclist

Personal information
- Born: 10 July 1927
- Died: 8 July 2014 (aged 86)

Cycling career
- Sport: Cycling
- Role: Rider

Guy Lintilhac (10 July 1927 – 8 July 2014) was a French racing cyclist. He rode in the 1951 Tour de France.
