= Lucien Didier =

Luxembourgish cyclist (born 1950)

Personal information
- Born: 5 August 1950 (age 76) Luxembourg, Luxembourg
- Height: 5 ft 10 in (1.78 m)
- Weight: 148 lb (67 kg)

Cycling career
- Sport: Cycling

Lucien Didier (born 5 August 1950) is a former Luxembourgish cyclist. He competed at the 1972 Summer Olympics and the 1976 Summer Olympics. He rode in ten Grand Tours between 1978 and 1984, including six Tours de France. In each of his Tour starts he completed the race and helped his team leader to overall victory - Bernard Hinault four times and Laurent Fignon twice. He was the son-in law of racing cyclist Bim Diederich and is the father of racing cyclist Laurent Didier.
