= Joseph Rasqui =

Luxembourgish cyclist

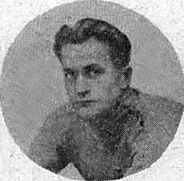

Personal information
- Born: 14 March 1895
- Died: 16 May 1966 (aged 71)

Cycling career
- Sport: Cycling
- Role: Rider

Joseph Rasqui (14 March 1895 – 16 May 1966) was a Luxembourgish racing cyclist. He rode in the 1922 Tour de France.
