= Josy Polfer =

Luxembourgish cyclist

Personal information
- Born: 9 May 1929
- Died: 21 January 1976 (aged 47)

Cycling career
- Sport: Cycling
- Role: Rider

Josy Polfer (9 May 1929 – 21 January 1976) was a Luxembourgish racing cyclist. He rode in the 1951 Tour de France.
