= Wim Dielissen =

Dutch cyclist

Personal information
- Born: 17 June 1926
- Died: 7 January 2002 (aged 75)

Cycling career
- Sport: Cycling
- Role: Rider

Wim Dielissen (17 June 1926 – 7 January 2002) was a Dutch racing cyclist. He rode in the 1951 Tour de France.
