= Pascal Triebel =

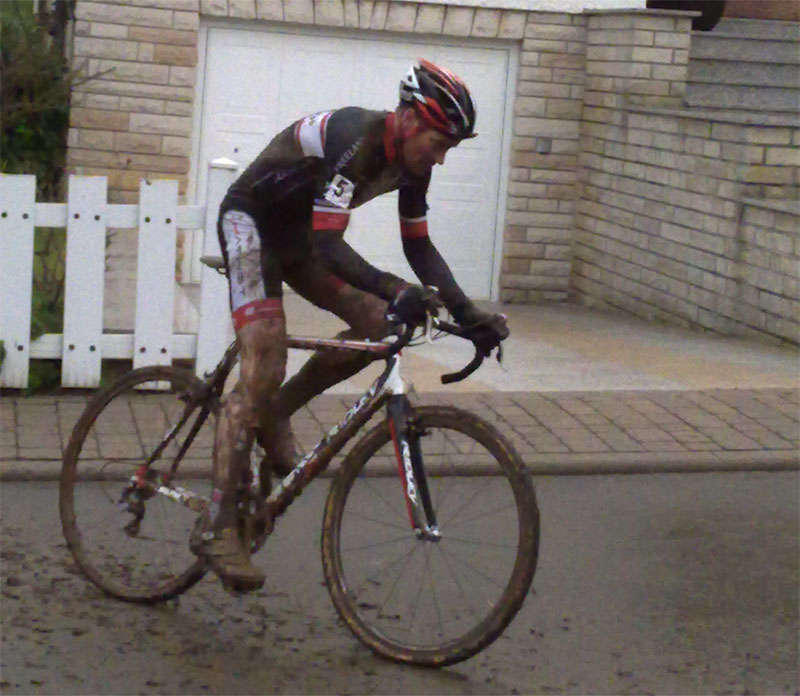

Personal information
- Born: 9 June 1966 (age 60) Luxembourg City

Cycling career
- Sport: Cycling
- Disciplines: Road, Cyclo-Cross
- Role: Rider

Amateur teams
- 2013: LC Tetange
- 2014: UC Munnerëfer Velosfrënn

Professional team
- 1989–1990: Hitachi

Pascal Triebel (born 9 June 1966 in Luxembourg City) is a Luxembourgish cyclist.

== Major results ==
=== Road ===
1987
2nd Flèche du Sud
1989
National Road Race Championships
1993
3rd Flèche du Sud
1995
1st Memorial Van Coningsloo
2nd Grand Prix François-Faber
1996
2nd Flèche du Sud

1st Stage 3b

2003
2nd National Time Trial Championships
2004
2nd National Time Trial Championships
2005
1st Grand Prix François-Faber
2nd Games of the Small States of Europe Road Race
2nd National Time Trial Championships

=== Cyclo-Cross ===
1984-1985
3rd National Cyclo-Cross Championships
1989-1990
3rd National Cyclo-Cross Championships
1992-1993
3rd National Cyclo-Cross Championships
1993-1994
National Cyclo-Cross Champion
1994-1995
National Cyclo-Cross Champion
1995-1996
National Cyclo-Cross Champion
1996-1997
National Cyclo-Cross Champion
1997-1998
National Cyclo-Cross Champion
1999-2000
National Cyclo-Cross Champion
2000-2001
National Cyclo-Cross Champion
2001-2002
National Cyclo-Cross Champion
2002-2003
2nd National Cyclo-Cross Championships
2003-2004
2nd National Cyclo-Cross Championships
2004-2005
3rd National Cyclo-Cross Championships
2005-2006
3rd National Cyclo-Cross Championships
2006-2007
2nd National Cyclo-Cross Championships
2007-2008
3rd National Cyclo-Cross Championships
2011-2012
3rd National Cyclo-Cross Championships
