= Henri Kass =

Luxembourgish cyclist

Personal information
- Born: 13 October 1919
- Died: 7 September 1982 (aged 62)

Cycling career
- Sport: Cycling
- Role: Rider

Henri Kass (13 October 1919 – 7 September 1982) was a Luxembourgish racing cyclist. He rode in the 1951 Tour de France.
