= 2016 UCI Road World Championships – Men's road race =

Men's road race
2016 UCI Road World Championships
- Rainbow jersey

Race details
- Dates: 16 October 2016
- Stages: 1
- Distance: 257.3 km (159.9 mi)
- Winning time: 5h 40' 43"

Medalists
	Gold	Peter Sagan (SVK)
	Silver	Mark Cavendish (GBR)
	Bronze	Tom Boonen (BEL)

The Men's road race of the 2016 UCI Road World Championships was a cycling event that took place on 16 October 2016 in Doha, Qatar. It was the 83rd edition of the championship, and Slovakia's Peter Sagan was the defending champion.

Sagan became the first rider since Paolo Bettini in 2006 and 2007 to retain the rainbow jersey, after winning the sprint finish from a select group of riders that had made a break from the rest of the field in the opening half of the race, in the desert crosswinds. The silver medal went to 2011 world champion Mark Cavendish from Great Britain, a bike length in arrears of Sagan, with the bronze medal going to Belgium's Tom Boonen, the 2005 world champion. It was the first time that all three medallists were previous world title winners.

== Course ==
The race was due to start and finish in the capital city of Doha, the home base for the Tour of Qatar. The route for the Worlds road races was presented in February 2015, which was made up of a loop of 80 kilometres (50 miles) through the desert and a finishing circuit in Doha city centre, including 1.2 kilometres (0.75 miles) of cobblestones. The finishing circuit of 15.2 kilometres (9.4 miles) on The Pearl Island was used for a stage of February's Tour of Qatar: riders noted that the course was highly technical, going through 24 roundabouts, with stage winner Alexander Kristoff comparing it to a criterium. However it was also noted that the lack of long straight sections meant that the effect of the crosswinds frequently occurring in Qatar would be significantly lessened, reducing the race's unpredictability.

Subsequently, in August 2016 it was reported that the UCI had made changes to the course, increasing the amount of riding through the desert to 151 kilometres (94 miles) and reducing the number of laps of the finishing circuit from eleven down to seven. The start of the men's race was also moved to the Aspire Zone, with the riders heading out northwards towards Al Khor and returning to Doha.

== Qualification ==
Qualification was based on performances on the UCI run tours and UCI World Ranking during 2016. Results from January to the middle of August counted towards the qualification criteria on both the UCI World Ranking and the UCI Continental Circuits across the world, with the rankings being determined upon the release of the numerous rankings on 22 August 2016.

The following nations qualified.

Number of riders	Nations
14 to enter, 9 to start	Australia, Belgium, Colombia, France, Great Britain, Italy, Netherlands, Norway, Spain, Switzerland
9 to enter, 6 to start	Canada, Czech Republic, Denmark, Eritrea, Germany, Iran, Poland, Russia, Ukraine, United States
5 to enter, 3 to start	Algeria, Argentina, Austria, Belarus, Chile, Estonia, Ireland, Japan, Kazakhstan, Lithuania, Luxembourg, Morocco, New Zealand, Portugal, Slovakia, Slovenia, South Africa, South Korea, Venezuela
3 to enter, 2 to start	Bulgaria, Costa Rica, Croatia, Ecuador, Hong Kong, Latvia
2 to enter, 1 to start	Azerbaijan, Chinese Taipei, Ethiopia, Finland, Greece, Guatemala, Mexico, Mongolia, Romania, Rwanda, Sweden, Tunisia, Turkey, Uruguay

== Schedule ==
All times are in Arabia Standard Time (UTC+03:00).

Date	Time	Event
16 October 2016	10:30–16:35	Men's road race

== Participating nations ==
199 cyclists from 48 nations were entered in the men's road race, with 197 riders taking the start. The numbers of cyclists per nation are shown in parentheses.

- Algeria (3)
- Argentina (3)
- Australia (9)
- Austria (2)
- Azerbaijan (1)
- Belarus (3)
- Belgium (9)
- Canada (6)
- Colombia (7)
- Czech Republic (6)
- Denmark (6)
- Eritrea (6)
- Estonia (3)
- Ethiopia (1)
- Finland (1)
- France (9)
- Germany (6)
- Great Britain (9)
- Greece (1)
- Hong Kong (1)
- Ireland (3)
- Italy (9)
- Japan (2)
- Kazakhstan (3)
- Latvia (2)
- Lithuania (3)
- Luxembourg (2)
- Mexico (1)
- Mongolia (1)
- Morocco (3)
- Netherlands (9)
- New Zealand (2)
- Norway (9)
- Poland (6)
- Portugal (3)
- Romania (1)
- Russia (6)
- Rwanda (1)
- Slovakia (3)
- Slovenia (3)
- South Africa (3)
- Spain (9)
- Sweden (1)
- Switzerland (8)
- Tunisia (1)
- Ukraine (6)
- United States (6)
- Uruguay (1)

== Results ==
=== Final classification ===
Of the race's 199 entrants, 53 riders completed the full distance of 257.3 km (159.9 mi).

Rank	Rider	Country	Time
1	Peter Sagan	Slovakia	5h 40' 43"
2	Mark Cavendish	Great Britain	s.t.
3	Tom Boonen	Belgium	s.t.
4	Michael Matthews	Australia	s.t.
5	Giacomo Nizzolo	Italy	s.t.
6	Edvald Boasson Hagen	Norway	s.t.
7	Alexander Kristoff	Norway	s.t.
8	William Bonnet	France	s.t.
9	Niki Terpstra	Netherlands	s.t.
10	Greg Van Avermaet	Belgium	s.t.
11	Jacopo Guarnieri	Italy	s.t.
12	Adam Blythe	Great Britain	s.t.
13	Natnael Berhane	Eritrea	+ 4"
14	Jürgen Roelandts	Belgium	+ 9"
15	Ryan Roth	Canada	+ 9"
16	Truls Engen Korsæth	Norway	+ 9"
17	Tom Leezer	Netherlands	+ 9"
18	Nicolas Dougall	South Africa	+ 9"
19	Michael Kolář	Slovakia	+ 13"
20	Elia Viviani	Italy	+ 14"
21	Mathew Hayman	Australia	+ 21"
22	Anass Aït El Abdia	Morocco	+ 2' 48"
23	Oliver Naesen	Belgium	+ 4' 00"
24	Jasper Stuyven	Belgium	+ 4' 00"
25	Daniele Bennati	Italy	+ 4' 00"
26	Alexander Porsev	Russia	+ 5' 26"
27	Aidis Kruopis	Lithuania	+ 5' 26"
28	Maximiliano Richeze	Argentina	+ 5' 26"
29	Magnus Cort	Denmark	+ 5' 26"
30	Sven Erik Bystrøm	Norway	+ 5' 26"
31	Yauheni Hutarovich	Belarus	+ 5' 26"
32	Nacer Bouhanni	France	+ 5' 26"
33	Imanol Erviti	Spain	+ 5' 26"
34	Marco Haller	Austria	+ 5' 26"
35	Yukiya Arashiro	Japan	+ 5' 26"
36	Michael Schär	Switzerland	+ 5' 26"
37	Dylan Groenewegen	Netherlands	+ 5' 26"
38	Stefan Küng	Switzerland	+ 5' 26"
39	Juraj Sagan	Slovakia	+ 5' 26"
40	Maciej Bodnar	Poland	+ 5' 26"
41	Iljo Keisse	Belgium	+ 5' 26"
42	André Greipel	Germany	+ 5' 26"
43	Taylor Phinney	United States	+ 5' 26"
44	Koen de Kort	Netherlands	+ 5' 26"
45	Zdeněk Štybar	Czech Republic	+ 5' 26"
46	Manuel Quinziato	Italy	+ 5' 26"
47	Jens Debusschere	Belgium	+ 5' 26"
48	Dylan van Baarle	Netherlands	+ 5' 26"
49	Ben Swift	Great Britain	+ 5' 26"
50	Mitchell Docker	Australia	+ 5' 26"
51	Zak Dempster	Australia	+ 5' 33"
52	Scott Thwaites	Great Britain	+ 5' 33"
53	Robin Carpenter	United States	+ 6' 03"

=== Failed to finish ===
144 riders failed to finish, while Colombia's Rigoberto Urán and Norway's Vegard Breen failed to start.

Rider	Country
Jens Keukeleire	Belgium
Mauro Richeze	Argentina
Mekseb Debesay	Eritrea
Ryan Mullen	Ireland
Marc Sarreau	France
Arnaud Démare	France
Hugo Houle	Canada
Gediminas Bagdonas	Lithuania
Dmitriy Gruzdev	Kazakhstan
David de la Cruz	Spain
Jack Bauer	New Zealand
Francisco Ventoso	Spain
Luis Ángel Maté	Spain
Reto Hollenstein	Switzerland
Alexey Lutsenko	Kazakhstan
Youcef Reguigui	Algeria
Fumiyuki Beppu	Japan
Nikolas Maes	Belgium
Joey Rosskopf	United States
Fabian Lienhard	Switzerland
Carlos Barbero	Spain
Omar Fraile	Spain
Bernhard Eisel	Austria
Dion Smith	New Zealand
Matt Brammeier	Ireland
Łukasz Wiśniowski	Poland
Antoine Duchesne	Canada
Vegard Stake Laengen	Norway
Daniel Hoelgaard	Norway
Michael Mørkøv	Denmark
Lars Bak	Denmark
Guillaume Boivin	Canada
Jos van Emden	Netherlands
Matti Breschel	Denmark
Christopher Juul-Jensen	Denmark
John Degenkolb	Germany
Vyacheslav Kuznetsov	Russia
Marcel Kittel	Germany
Sonny Colbrelli	Italy
Jasha Sütterlin	Germany
Jempy Drucker	Luxembourg
Christophe Laporte	France
Nelson Oliveira	Portugal
Tony Martin	Germany
Grégory Rast	Switzerland
Bob Jungels	Luxembourg
Nils Politt	Germany
Sam Bennett	Ireland

Rider	Country
Heinrich Haussler	Australia
Sergiy Lagkuti	Ukraine
Søren Kragh Andersen	Denmark
Soufiane Haddi	Morocco
Azzedine Lagab	Algeria
Alexey Vermeulen	United States
Chad Haga	United States
Clint Hendricks	South Africa
Ryan Gibbons	South Africa
Daniel Turek	Czech Republic
Andriy Vasylyuk	Ukraine
Mihkel Räim	Estonia
Vitaliy Buts	Ukraine
Edwin Ávila	Colombia
Omar Mendoza	Colombia
Ian Stannard	Great Britain
Maksym Averin	Azerbaijan
Łukasz Owsian	Poland
Maciej Paterski	Poland
Matti Manninen	Finland
Geraint Thomas	Great Britain
Danny van Poppel	Netherlands
Mark Renshaw	Australia
Adrian Banaszek	Poland
Steve Cummings	Great Britain
Sebastian Langeveld	Netherlands
Luka Pibernik	Slovenia
Jiří Polnický	Czech Republic
Tom Dumoulin	Netherlands
Fabio Sabatini	Italy
Carlos Alzate	Colombia
Adam de Vos	Canada
Brayan Ramírez	Colombia
Ruslan Tleubayev	Kazakhstan
Daniel Oss	Italy
Andžs Flaksis	Latvia
Yoann Offredo	France
Ioannis Tamouridis	Greece
Cyril Lemoine	France
Anton Vorobyev	Russia
Karol Domagalski	Poland
Maxim Belkov	Russia
Fabricio Ferrari	Uruguay
Silvan Dillier	Switzerland
Sergey Lagutin	Russia
Andrei Nechita	Romania
Martin Elmiger	Switzerland
Pirmin Lang	Switzerland

Rider	Country
Juan José Lobato	Spain
Kristoffer Skjerping	Norway
Diego Rubio	Spain
Andriy Kulyk	Ukraine
Jonathan Castroviejo	Spain
Ramūnas Navardauskas	Lithuania
Luke Rowe	Great Britain
Fernando Gaviria	Colombia
Walter Vargas	Colombia
Daniel McLay	Great Britain
Adrien Petit	France
Geoffrey Soupe	France
Luke Durbridge	Australia
Caleb Ewan	Australia
Steele Von Hoff	Australia
Matteo Trentin	Italy
Sondre Holst Enger	Norway
Roman Maikin	Russia
Eric Marcotte	United States
Vojtěch Hačecký	Czech Republic
Alois Kaňkovský	Czech Republic
František Sisr	Czech Republic
Andrii Bratashchuk	Ukraine
Mykhaylo Kononenko	Ukraine
José Goncalves	Portugal
Sérgio Paulinho	Portugal
Grega Bole	Slovenia
Luka Mezgec	Slovenia
Metkel Eyob	Eritrea
Daniel Teklehaimanot	Eritrea
Tesfom Okubamariam	Eritrea
Meron Teshome	Eritrea
Alo Jakin	Estonia
Gert Jõeäär	Estonia
Salah Eddine Mraouni	Morocco
Abderrahmane Mehdi Hamza	Algeria
Ryan Anderson	Canada
Siarhei Papok	Belarus
Kanstantsin Sivtsov	Belarus
Francisco Chamorro	Argentina
Māris Bogdanovičs	Latvia
Ho Burr	Hong Kong
Bonaventure Uwizeyimana	Rwanda
René Corella	Mexico
Hassen Ben Nasser	Tunisia
Tedros Redae	Ethiopia
Jonas Ahlstrand	Sweden
Myagmarsuren Baasankhuu	Mongolia
