= 2021 UCI Road World Championships – Men's road race =

Cycling race

Men's road race
2021 UCI Road World Championships
- Rainbow jersey

Race details
- Dates: 26 September 2021
- Stages: 1 in Leuven, Belgium
- Distance: 268.3 km (166.7 mi)
- Winning time: 5h 56' 34"

Medalists
	Gold	(France) Julian Alaphilippe (FRA)
	Silver	(Netherlands) Dylan van Baarle (NED)
	Bronze	(Denmark) Michael Valgren (DEN)

The men's road race of the 2021 UCI Road World Championships was a cycling event that took place on 26 September 2021 from Antwerp to Leuven, Belgium. Defending champion Julian Alaphilippe of France won the event in a solo victory.

== Qualification ==
Qualification was based mainly on the UCI World Ranking by nations as of 17 August 2021.

=== UCI World Rankings ===
The following nations qualified.

Criterium	Rank	Number of riders		Nations
Criterium	Rank	To enter	To start	Nations
UCI World Ranking by Nations	1–10	13	8	Belgium; Slovenia; France; Netherlands; Great Britain; Italy; Spain; Denmark; Australia; Colombia
UCI World Ranking by Nations	11–20	9	6	Germany; Ecuador; Switzerland; Portugal; Russian Cycling Federation; Norway; Ireland; Poland; United States; Canada
UCI World Ranking by Nations	21–30	7	4	New Zealand; South Africa; Austria; Kazakhstan; Czech Republic; Estonia; Slovakia; Ukraine; Eritrea; Latvia
UCI World Ranking by Nations	31–50	2	1	Luxembourg; Belarus; Sweden; Algeria; Panama; Romania; Lithuania; Hungary; Greece; Mexico; Thailand; Guatemala; Mongolia; Japan; Uruguay; Chile; Finland; Venezuela; Puerto Rico; Albania
UCI World Ranking by Individuals (if not already qualified)	1–200	2	1	—N/a

=== Continental champions ===
Name	Country	Reason
Richard Carapaz	Ecuador	Olympic Champion
Julian Alaphilippe	France	Outgoing World Champion
Ryan Gibbons	South Africa	African Champion

=== Participating nations ===
194 cyclists from 45 nations competed in the event. The number of cyclists per nation is shown in parentheses.

- Albania (1)
- Australia (8)
- Austria (4)
- Belarus (1)
- Belgium (8)
- Canada (6)
- Colombia (8)
- Czech Republic (4)
- Denmark (8)
- Ecuador (6)
- Eritrea (4)
- Estonia (4)
- France (9)
- Germany (6)
- Great Britain (8)
- Greece (1)
- Hungary (1)
- Ireland (3)
- Italy (8)
- Japan (1)
- Kazakhstan (4)
- Latvia (4)
- Lithuania (1)
- Luxembourg (2)
- Mexico (1)
- Mongolia (1)
- Netherlands (8)
- New Zealand (4)
- Norway (6)
- Panama (1)
- Poland (6)
- Portugal (5)
- Romania (1)
- Russian Cycling Federation (6)
- Slovakia (4)
- Slovenia (8)
- South Africa (4)
- Spain (8)
- Sweden (2)
- Switzerland (6)
- Thailand (1)
- Ukraine (4)
- Uruguay (1)
- United States (6)
- Venezuela (1)

== Final classification ==
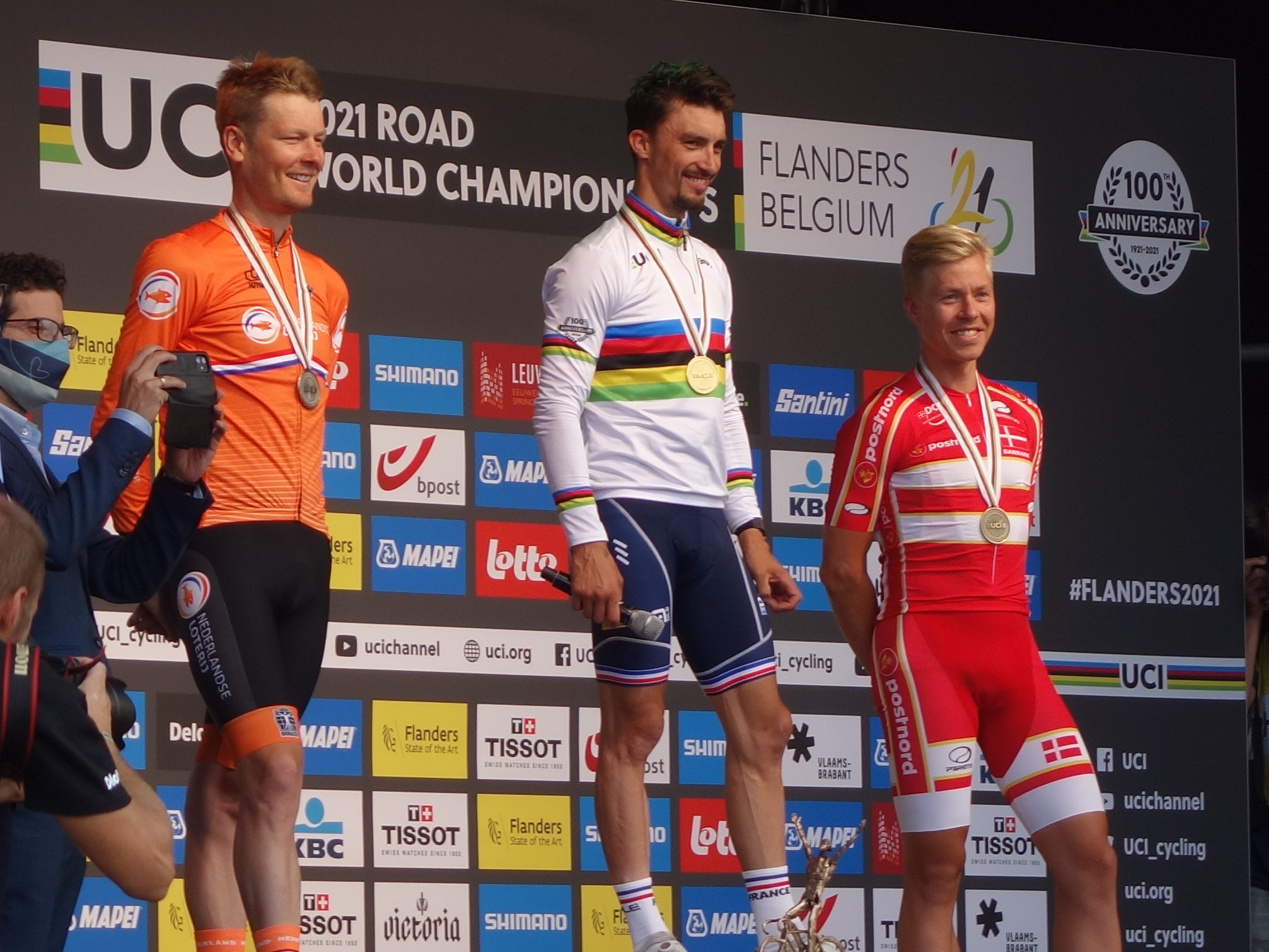
Podium of the men's elite road race

Of the race's 194 entrants, 68 riders completed the full distance of 268.3 kilometres (166.7 mi).

Rank	Rider	Country	Time
1	Julian Alaphilippe	France	5h 56' 34"
2	Dylan van Baarle	Netherlands	+ 32"
3	Michael Valgren	Denmark	+ 32"
4	Jasper Stuyven	Belgium	+ 32"
5	Neilson Powless	United States	+ 32"
6	Tom Pidcock	Great Britain	+ 49"
7	Zdeněk Štybar	Czech Republic	+ 1' 06"
8	Mathieu van der Poel	Netherlands	+ 1' 18"
9	Florian Sénéchal	France	+ 1' 18"
10	Sonny Colbrelli	Italy	+ 1' 18"
11	Wout van Aert	Belgium	+ 1' 18"
12	Markus Hoelgaard	Norway	+ 1' 18"
13	Valentin Madouas	France	+ 1' 18"
14	Matej Mohorič	Slovenia	+ 4' 00"
15	Giacomo Nizzolo	Italy	+ 4' 05"
16	Nils Politt	Germany	+ 5' 25"
17	Guillaume Boivin	Canada	+ 5' 25"
18	Jan Polanc	Slovenia	+ 5' 25"
19	Benoît Cosnefroy	France	+ 5' 30"
20	Victor Campenaerts	Belgium	+ 5' 30"
21	Alexander Kristoff	Norway	+ 6' 27"
22	Mike Teunissen	Netherlands	+ 6' 27"
23	Iván García Cortina	Spain	+ 6' 27"
24	Diego Ulissi	Italy	+ 6' 27"
25	Michael Matthews	Australia	+ 6' 27"
26	Peter Sagan	Slovakia	+ 6' 27"
27	Dylan Teuns	Belgium	+ 6' 27"
28	Sebastian Schönberger	Austria	+ 6' 27"
29	Bauke Mollema	Netherlands	+ 6' 27"
30	Luka Mezgec	Slovenia	+ 6' 27"
31	Tiesj Benoot	Belgium	+ 6' 27"
32	Petr Vakoč	Czech Republic	+ 6' 27"
33	Sven Erik Bystrøm	Norway	+ 6' 27"
34	Vegard Stake Laengen	Norway	+ 6' 27"
35	Ethan Hayter	Great Britain	+ 6' 27"
36	Michał Kwiatkowski	Poland	+ 6' 27"
37	Tadej Pogačar	Slovenia	+ 6' 27"
38	Patrick Gamper	Austria	+ 6' 27"
39	Rui Oliveira	Portugal	+ 6' 27"
40	Artem Nych	Russian Cycling Federation	+ 6' 31"
41	Stefan Küng	Switzerland	+ 6' 31"
42	Gorka Izagirre	Spain	+ 6' 31"
43	Imanol Erviti	Spain	+ 6' 31"
44	Gonzalo Serrano	Spain	+ 6' 31"
45	Silvan Dillier	Switzerland	+ 6' 31"
46	Cesare Benedetti	Poland	+ 6' 31"
47	João Almeida	Portugal	+ 6' 31"
48	Primož Roglič	Slovenia	+ 6' 31"
49	Yukiya Arashiro	Japan	+ 6' 31"
50	Merhawi Kudus	Eritrea	+ 6' 31"
51	Rasmus Tiller	Norway	+ 6' 31"
52	Emīls Liepiņš	Latvia	+ 6' 31"
53	Carlos Rodríguez	Spain	+ 6' 39"
54	Michael Gogl	Austria	+ 6' 40"
55	Nelson Oliveira	Portugal	+ 6' 40"
56	Arnaud Démare	France	+ 6' 48"
57	Lawson Craddock	United States	+ 6' 49"
58	Gianni Moscon	Italy	+ 6' 52"
59	Roger Adrià	Spain	+ 7' 04"
60	Toms Skujiņš	Latvia	+ 7' 07"
61	Yves Lampaert	Belgium	+ 7' 22"
62	Remco Evenepoel	Belgium	+ 7' 22"
63	Fabian Lienhard	Switzerland	+ 15' 43"
64	Esteban Chaves	Colombia	+ 15' 43"
65	Nelson Soto	Colombia	+ 17' 18"
66	Pascal Eenkhoorn	Netherlands	+ 17' 18"
67	Nikias Arndt	Germany	+ 17' 18"
68	Georg Zimmermann	Germany	+ 17' 18"

Rider	Country	Time
Anthony Turgis	France	DNF
Danny van Poppel	Netherlands	DNF
Tim Declercq	Belgium	DNF
Dmitry Strakhov	Russian Cycling Federation	DNF
Jake Stewart	Great Britain	DNF
Natnael Berhane	Eritrea	DNF
Caleb Ewan	Australia	DNF
Alex Aranburu	Spain	DNF
Sergey Chernetskiy	Russian Cycling Federation	DNF
Rigoberto Urán	Colombia	DNF
Łukasz Owsian	Poland	DNF
Hugo Houle	Canada	DNF
Antoine Duchesne	Canada	DNF
Yevgeniy Gidich	Kazakhstan	DNF
Barnabás Peák	Hungary	DNF
Metkel Eyob	Eritrea	DNF
Nickolas Zukowsky	Canada	DNF
Jayde Julius	South Africa	DNF
Igor Boev	Russian Cycling Federation	DNF
Byron Guamá	Ecuador	DNF
Fernando Gaviria	Colombia	DNF
Andreas Kron	Denmark	DNF
Mikkel Frølich Honoré	Denmark	DNF
Mads Pedersen	Denmark	DNF
Nathan Haas	Australia	DNF
Alex Kirsch	Luxembourg	DNF
Marco Haller	Austria	DNF
Joel Levi Burbano	Ecuador	DNF
Brandon McNulty	United States	DNF
Rafael Reis	Portugal	DNF
Harry Sweeny	Australia	DNF
Eduard-Michael Grosu	Romania	DNF
Kim Magnusson	Sweden	DNF
Eric Antonio Fagundez	Uruguay	DNF
Juraj Sagan	Slovakia	DNF
Andriy Kulyk	Ukraine	DNF
Pascal Ackermann	Germany	DNF
Mykhaylo Kononenko	Ukraine	DNF
Juan Sebastián Molano	Colombia	DNF
Daniil Fominykh	Kazakhstan	DNF
Yuriy Natarov	Kazakhstan	DNF
Kevin Geniets	Luxembourg	DNF
Clément Russo	France	DNF
Reinardt Janse van Rensburg	South Africa	DNF
David Per	Slovenia	DNF
Lluís Mas	Spain	DNF
Ryan Mullen	Ireland	DNF
Pier-André Côté	Canada	DNF
Krists Neilands	Latvia	DNF
André Carvalho	Portugal	DNF
Quinn Simmons	United States	DNF
Oscar Riesebeek	Netherlands	DNF
Ben Perry	Canada	DNF
Andrea Bagioli	Italy	DNF
Domen Novak	Slovenia	DNF
Connor Swift	Great Britain	DNF
Patrik Tybor	Slovakia	DNF
Jan Tratnik	Slovenia	DNF
Mārtiņš Pluto	Latvia	DNF
Michał Gołaś	Poland	DNF
Matteo Trentin	Italy	DNF
Alessandro De Marchi	Italy	DNF
Marc Hirschi	Switzerland	DNF
Ryan Gibbons	South Africa	DNF
Maciej Bodnar	Poland	DNF
Luke Durbridge	Australia	DNF
Mads Würtz Schmidt	Denmark	DNF
Connor Brown	New Zealand	DNF
Ben Swift	Great Britain	DNF
Mark Cavendish	Great Britain	DNF
Magnus Cort	Denmark	DNF
Eddie Dunbar	Ireland	DNF
Mikkel Bjerg	Denmark	DNF
Erik Baška	Slovakia	DNF
Pavel Kochetkov	Russian Cycling Federation	DNF
Oleksandr Prevar	Ukraine	DNF
Petr Rikunov	Russian Cycling Federation	DNF
Odd Christian Eiking	Norway	DNF
Jambaljamts Sainbayar	Mongolia	DNF
Sergio Higuita	Colombia	DNF
Jack Bauer	New Zealand	DNF
Leonidas Sebastián Novoa	Ecuador	DNF
Michael Schär	Switzerland	DNF
Miles Scotson	Australia	DNF
Lucas Eriksson	Sweden	DNF
Ylber Sefa	Albania	DNF
Oskar Nisu	Estonia	DNF
Max Schachmann	Germany	DNF
Stefan Bissegger	Switzerland	DNF
Tom Scully	New Zealand	DNF
Evaldas Šiškevičius	Lithuania	DNF
Orluis Aular	Venezuela	DNF
Matteo Jorgenson	United States	DNF
Wilson Haro	Ecuador	DNF
Fred Wright	Great Britain	DNF
Cristian Pita	Ecuador	DNF
Josef Černý	Czech Republic	DNF
Norman Vahtra	Estonia	DNF
Karl Patrick Lauk	Estonia	DNF
Dmitriy Gruzdev	Kazakhstan	DNF
Sebastian Langeveld	Netherlands	DNF
Gustav Basson	South Africa	DNF
Álvaro Hodeg	Colombia	DNF
Sarawut Sirironnachai	Thailand	DNF
Rory Townsend	Ireland	DNF
Polychronis Tzortzakis	Greece	DNF
Stanisław Aniołkowski	Poland	DNF
Luke Rowe	Great Britain	DNF
Eder Frayre	Mexico	DNF
Robin Carpenter	United States	DNF
Martin Laas	Estonia	DNF
José Tito Hernández	Colombia	DNF
John Degenkolb	Germany	DNF
Anatoliy Budyak	Ukraine	DNF
Franklin Archibold	Panama	DNF
Aleksandr Riabushenko	Belarus	DNF
Nick Schultz	New Zealand	DNF
Michael Kukrle	Czech Republic	DNF
Rémi Cavagna	France	DNF
Dawit Yemane	Eritrea	DNF
Kasper Asgreen	Denmark	DNF
Shane Archbold	New Zealand	DNF
Robert Stannard	Australia	DNF
Davide Ballerini	Italy	DNF
Christophe Laporte	France	DNF
Benjamín Quinteros	Ecuador	DNS
