= 2017 UCI Africa Tour =

- Thirteenth edition of the UCI Africa Tour

Details
- Dates: 28 October 2016–15 October 2017
- Location: Africa
- Races: 20

The 2017 UCI Africa Tour was the 13th season of the UCI Africa Tour. The season began on 28 October 2016 with the Tour du Faso and ended on 15 October 2017.

The points leader, based on the cumulative results of previous races, wears the UCI Africa Tour cycling jersey.

Throughout the season, points are awarded to the top finishers of stages within stage races and the final general classification standings of each of the stages races and one-day events. The quality and complexity of a race also determines how many points are awarded to the top finishers, the higher the UCI rating of a race, the more points are awarded. The UCI ratings from highest to lowest are as follows:

- Multi-day events: 2.HC, 2.1 and 2.2
- One-day events: 1.HC, 1.1 and 1.2

== Events ==
=== 2016 ===
Date	Race Name	Location	UCI Rating	Winner	Team
28 Oct–6 Nov	Tour du Faso	Burkina Faso	2.2	Harouna Ilboudo (BUR)	
13–20 November	Tour of Rwanda	Rwanda	2.2	Valens Ndayisenga (RWA)	Dimension Data for Qhubeka

=== 2017 ===
Date	Race Name	Location	UCI Rating	Winner	Team
3 February	GP Sakia El Hamra	Morocco	1.2	Ahmed Galdoune (MAR)	Delio Gallina Colosio Eurofeed
5 February	GP Oued Eddahab	Morocco	1.2	Ivan Balykin (RUS)	Torku Şekerspor
6 February	GP Al Massira	Morocco	1.2	Ahmet Örken (TUR)	Torku Şekerspor
9 February	Trophée Princier	Morocco	1.2	Thomas Vaubourzeix (FRA)	Nice Cycling Team
11 February	Trophée de l'Anniversaire	Morocco	1.2	Umberto Marengo (ITA)	Delio Gallina Colosio Eurofeed
12 February	Trophée de la Maison Royale	Morocco	1.2	Ahmed Galdoune (MAR)	Delio Gallina Colosio Eurofeed
14 February	African Continental Championships – TTT	Egypt	CC	Meron Berhane (ERI); Amanuel Gebrezgabihier (ERI); Awet Habtom (ERI); Meron Teshome (ERI)	Eritrea (national team)
16 February	African Continental Championships – ITT	Egypt	CC	Meron Teshome (ERI)	Eritrea (national team)
19 February	African Continental Championships – RR	Egypt	CC	Willie Smit (RSA)	South Africa (national team)
27 February–5 March	La Tropicale Amissa Bongo	Gabon	2.1	Yohann Gène (FRA)	Direct Énergie
10–18 March	Tour du Cameroun	Cameroon	2.2	Nikodemus Holler (GER)	Bike Aid
7–16 April	Tour du Maroc	Morocco	2.2	Anass Aït El Abdia (MAR)	Morocco (national team)
15 April	Fenkil Northern Red Sea Challenge	Eritrea	1.2	Pierpaolo Ficara (ITA)	Amore & Vita–Selle SMP
16 April	Massawa Circuit	Eritrea	1.2	Simon Musie (ERI)	Eritrea (national team)
18–22 April	Tour of Eritrea	Eritrea	2.2	Zemenfes Solomon (ERI)	Eritrea (national team)
22–29 April	Tour du Sénégal	Senegal	2.2	Islam Mansouri (ALG)	Vélo Club Sovac
23 April	Asmara Circuit	Eritrea	1.2	Mikiel Habtom (ERI)	EriTel
10–14 May	Tour de Tunisie	Tunisia	2.2	Matthias Legley (BEL)	Naturablue
28 August–2 September	Tour Meles Zenawi	Ethiopia	2.2	Willie Smit (RSA)	South Africa (national team)
8–14 September	Tour de Côte d'Ivoire	Ivory Coast	2.2	Dieter Bouvry (BEL)	Flanders (regional team)
11–15 October	Grand Prix Chantal Biya	Cameroon	2.2	Clovis Kamzong (CMR)	SNH Vélo Club
