= 2017 in cycle sport =

The 2017 in cycling results is given as follows:

== Cycle ball ==
=== 2017 Continental and World Cycle-ball events ===
- May 20: 2017 UEC Elite Cycle Ball European Championships in (Germany) Darmstadt
  - Winners: Austria (Patrick Schnetzer & Markus Bröll)
- May 26 & 27: 2017 UEC Juniors Indoor Cycling European Championships in (Czech Republic) Prague
  - Elite single artistic cycling winners: (Germany) Tim Weber (m) / (Austria) Lorena Schneider (f)
  - Mixed single artistic cycling winners: Germany (Julia Dörner, Pia Pollinger, Annamaria Milo, & Anna-Lena Vollbrecht)
  - Elite women's pair artistic cycling winners: Germany (Pia Seidel & Lea Marie Andexlinger)
  - Mixed pair artistic cycling winners: Germany (Matthias & Michael Quecke)
  - Junior men's cycle ball winners: Germany (Max Rückschloß & Eric Haedicke)
- September 16: 2017 UEC U23 Cycle Ball European Championships in (France) Dorlisheim
  - Winners: Austria (Stefan Feurstein & Kevin Bachmann)
- November 24–26: 2017 UCI Indoor Cycling World Championships in (Austria) Dornbirn
  - Elite Single Artistic Cycling winners: (Germany) Lukas Kohl (m) / (Germany) Milena Slupina (f)
  - Women's Pair Artistic Cycling winners: Germany (Julia Thürmer & Nadja Thürmer)
  - Mixed Elite Artistic Cycling winners: Switzerland (Céline Burlet, Flavia Zuber, Jennifer Schmid, & Melanie Schmid)
  - Mixed Elite Pair Artistic Cycling winners: Germany (Max Hanselmann & Serafin Schefold)
  - Men's Cycle-ball winners: Germany (Bernd Mlady & Gerhard Mlady)

=== 2017 UCI Cycle-ball World Cup ===
- May 6: CBWC #1 in (Belgium) Beringen
  - Winners: Germany (André Kopp & Manuel Kopp)
- August 26: CBWC #2 in Altdorf
  - Winners: Switzerland (Dominik Planzer & Roman Schneider)
- September 2: CBWC #3 in (Austria) Sankt Pölten
  - Winners: Germany (Gerhard Mlady & Bernd Mlady)
- October 14: CBWC #4 in (Switzerland) St. Gallen
  - Winners: Austria (Patrick Schnetzer & Markus Bröll)
- November 4: CBWC #5 in (Switzerland) Liestal
  - Winners: Austria (Patrick Schnetzer & Markus Bröll)
- December 2: CBWC #6 (final) in (Germany) Willich
  - Winners: Austria (Patrick Schnetzer & Markus Bröll)

== Cycling – BMX ==
=== 2017 Continental and World BMX events ===
- March 4: 2017 Oceania BMX Continental Championships in (Australia) Bathurst
  - Elite winners: (Australia) Kai Sakakibara (m) / (Australia) Leanna Curtis (f)
  - Junior winners: (New Zealand) Maynard Peel (m) / (Australia) Saya Sakakibara (f)
- May 28 & 29: 2017 Asian BMX Continental Championships in (Thailand) Suphan Buri
  - Elite winners: (Japan) Jukia Yoshimura (m) / (China) LU Yan (f)
  - Junior winners: (Japan) Taichi Ikegami (m) / (Japan) Sae Hatakeyama (f)
- June 3: 2017 Pan American BMX Continental Championships in (Argentina) Santiago del Estero
  - Elite winners: (Argentina) Exequiel Torres (m) / (Argentina) Gabriela Díaz (f)
  - Junior winners: (Colombia) Samuel Zuleta Vasco (m) / (Brazil) Paola Reis (f)
- July 14–16: 2017 European BMX Continental Championships in (France) Bordeaux
  - Elite winners: (France) Joris Daudet (m) / (Netherlands) Laura Smulders (f)
  - Junior winners: (Switzerland) Cédric Butti (m) / (United Kingdom) Blaine Ridge-Davis (f)
- July 25–29: 2017 UCI BMX World Championships in (United States) Rock Hill, South Carolina
  - Elite winners: (United States) Corben Sharrah (m) / (United States) Alise Post (f)
  - Junior winners: (Switzerland) Cédric Butti (m) / (United Kingdom) Bethany Shriever (f)

=== 2017 UCI BMX Supercross World Cup ===
- May 6 & 7: BMXWC #1 & #2 in (Netherlands) Papendal
  - Men's Elite winners: (France) Sylvain André (#1) / (France) Joris Daudet (#2)
  - Women's Elite winner: (Netherlands) Laura Smulders (2 times)
- May 13 & 14: BMXWC #3 & #4 in (Belgium) Heusden-Zolder
  - Men's Elite winners: (United States) Connor Fields (#1) / (Netherlands) Twan van Gendt (#2)
  - Women's Elite winners: (Colombia) Mariana Pajón (#1) / (Netherlands) Laura Smulders (#2)
- September 16 & 17: BMXWC #5 & #6 (final) in (Argentina) Santiago del Estero
  - Men's Elite winners: (Argentina) Exequiel Torres (#1) / (United States) Connor Fields (#2)
  - Women's Elite winner: (Colombia) Mariana Pajón (2 times)

=== 2017 UEC BMX European Cup ===
- April 1 & 2: UEC BMX European Cup #1 & #2 in (Belgium) Heusden-Zolder
  - Elite winners: (Switzerland) David Graf (m; 2 times) / (Netherlands) Laura Smulders (f; 2 times)
  - Men's Junior winners: (Germany) Kay Stindl (#1) / (Switzerland) Cédric Butti (#2)
  - Women's Junior winner: (United Kingdom) Bethany Shriever (2 times)
- April 28 – 30: UEC BMX European Cup #3 & #4 in (Netherlands) Erp
  - Men's Elite winner: (Netherlands) Niek Kimmann (2 times)
  - Women's Elite winners: (Netherlands) Laura Smulders (#1) / (Russia) Natalia Afremova (#2)
  - Men's Junior winners: (Switzerland) Cédric Butti (#1) / (New Zealand) Maynard Peel (#2)
  - Women's Junior winner (United Kingdom) Bethany Shriever (2 times)
- May 19 – 21: UEC BMX European Cup #5 & #6 in (Czech Republic) Prague
  - Elite winners: (Netherlands) Joris Harmsen (m; 2 times) / (Netherlands) Laura Smulders (f; 2 times)
  - Men's Junior winner: (Latvia) Mikus Strazdins (2 times)
  - Women's Junior winners: (Latvia) Vineta Petersone (#1) / (United Kingdom) Blaine Ridge-Davis (#2)
- June 2–4: UEC BMX European Cup #7 & #8 in (Italy) Verona
  - Men's Elite winners: (United Kingdom) Kyle Evans (#1) / (Norway) Tore Navrestad (#2)
  - Women's Elite winners: (Colombia) Mariana Pajón (#1) / (Netherlands) Laura Smulders (#2)
  - Men's Junior winners: (Switzerland) Cédric Butti (#1) / (United Kingdom) Kye Whyte (#2)
  - Women's Junior winners: (Japan) Sae Hatakeyama (#1) / (United Kingdom) Bethany Shriever (#2)
- June 16–18: UEC BMX European Cup #9 & #10 (finals) in (Norway) Sandness
  - Men's Elite winners: (United Kingdom) Kyle Evans (#1) / (Norway) Tore Navrestad (#2)
  - Women's Elite winners: (Denmark) Simone Christensen (#1) / (Russia) Yaroslava Bondarenko (#2)
  - Men's Junior winner: (Netherlands) Kevin van de Groenendaal (2 times)
  - Women's Junior winners: (Latvia) Vineta Petersone (#1) / (Norway) Silje Gloslie Fiskbekk (#2)

== Cycling – Cyclo-cross ==
=== 2016–17 International Cyclo-cross events ===
- October 29, 2016: 2016 UCI Pan-American Cyclo-cross Continental Championships in (United States) Covington, Kentucky (debut event)
  - Elite winners: (United States) Stephen Hyde (m) / (United States) Katie Compton (f)
  - U23 winners: (United States) Curtis White (m) / (United States) Ellen Noble (f)
  - Men's Junior winner: (United States) Denzel Stephenson
- October 29 & 30, 2016: 2016 UEC Cyclo-cross European Championships in (France) Pontchâteau
  - Elite winners: (Belgium) Toon Aerts (m) / (Netherlands) Thalita de Jong (f)
  - U23 winners: (Belgium) Quinten Hermans (m) / (Italy) Chiara Teocchi (f)
  - Men's Junior winner: (United Kingdom) Tom Pidcock
- December 2 & 3, 2016: 2016 UCI Masters Cyclo-cross World Championships in Mol, Belgium
  - For results, click here.
- January 28 & 29: 2017 UCI Cyclo-cross World Championships in (Luxembourg) Bieles
  - Elite winners: (Belgium) Wout van Aert (m) / (Belgium) Sanne Cant (f)
  - U23 winners: (Netherlands) Joris Nieuwenhuis (m) / (Netherlands) Annemarie Worst (f)
  - Men's Junior winner: (United Kingdom) Tom Pidcock

=== 2016–17 UCI Cyclo-cross World Cup ===
- September 21, 2016: #1 in (United States) Las Vegas
  - Elite winners: (Belgium) Wout van Aert (m) / (Netherlands) Sophie de Boer (f)
- September 24, 2016: #2 in (United States) Iowa City, Iowa
  - Elite winners: (Belgium) Wout van Aert (m) / (United States) Katie Compton (f)
- October 23, 2016: #3 in (Netherlands) Valkenburg aan de Geul
  - Elite winners: (Netherlands) Mathieu van der Poel (m) / (Netherlands) Thalita de Jong (f)
- November 20, 2016: #4 in (Belgium) Koksijde
  - Event cancelled, due to safety issues.
- November 26, 2016: #5 in (Germany) Zeven
  - Elite winners: (Netherlands) Mathieu van der Poel (m) / (Belgium) Sanne Cant (f)
- December 18, 2016: #6 in (Belgium) Namur
  - Elite winners: (Netherlands) Mathieu van der Poel (m) / (Czech Republic) Kateřina Nash (f)
- December 26, 2016: #7 in (Belgium) Heusden-Zolder
  - Elite winners: (Belgium) Wout van Aert (m) / (Netherlands) Marianne Vos (f)
- January 15: #8 in (Italy) Fiuggi
  - Elite winners: (Belgium) Wout van Aert (m) / (Netherlands) Marianne Vos (f)
- January 22: #9 (final) in (Netherlands) Hoogerheide
  - Elite winners: (Netherlands) Lars van der Haar (m) / (Netherlands) Marianne Vos (f)

=== 2016–17 Cyclo-cross Superprestige ===
- October 2, 2016: #1 in (Netherlands) Gieten
  - Elite winners: (Netherlands) Mathieu van der Poel (m) / (Belgium) Sanne Cant (f)
  - U–23 winner: (Netherlands) Joris Nieuwenhuis
  - Junior winner: (Belgium) Jelle Camps
- October 16, 2016: #2 in (Belgium) Zonhoven
  - Elite winners: (Netherlands) Mathieu van der Poel (m) / (Belgium) Sanne Cant (f)
  - U–23 winner: (Belgium) Quinten Hermans
  - Junior winner: (United Kingdom) Thomas Pidcock
- November 6, 2016: #3 in (Belgium) Oostkamp
  - Elite winners: (Netherlands) Mathieu van der Poel (m) / (Netherlands) Sophie de Boer (f)
  - U–23 winner: (Belgium) Quinten Hermans
  - Junior winner: (Belgium) Toon Vandebosch
- November 13, 2016: #4 in (Belgium) Gavere
  - Elite winners: (Netherlands) Mathieu van der Poel (m) / (Belgium) Sanne Cant (f)
  - U-23 winner: (Belgium) Eli Iserbyt
  - Junior winner: (Belgium) Toon Vandebosch
- December 3, 2016: #5 in (Belgium) Spa-Francorchamps
  - Elite winners: (Belgium) Wout van Aert (m) / (Netherlands) Thalita de Jong (f)
  - U-23 winner: (Belgium) Quinten Hermans
  - Junior winner: (Belgium) Toon Vandebosch
- December 23, 2016: #6 in (Belgium) Diegem
  - Elite winners: (Netherlands) Mathieu van der Poel (m) / (Netherlands) Marianne Vos (f)
  - U-23 winner: (Belgium) Quinten Hermans
  - Junior winner: (Belgium) Jelle Camps
- February 5: #7 in (Belgium) Hoogstraten
  - Elite winners: (Netherlands) Mathieu van der Poel (m) / (Netherlands) Sophie de Boer (f)
  - U–23 winner: (Netherlands) Joris Nieuwenhuis
  - Junior winner: (Belgium) Jelle Camps
- February 11: #8 (final) in (Belgium) Middelkerke
  - Elite winners: (Netherlands) Mathieu van der Poel (m) / (Belgium) Sanne Cant (f)
  - U–23 winner: (Netherlands) Joris Nieuwenhuis
  - Junior winner: (Belgium) Jelle Camps

=== 2016–17 DVV Trophy ===
- October 9, 2016: #1 in (Belgium) Ronse
  - Elite winners: (Belgium) Wout van Aert (m) / (Netherlands) Thalita de Jong (f)
  - U-23 winner: (Netherlands) Joris Nieuwenhuis
  - Junior winner: (Belgium) Yentl Bekaert
- November 1, 2016: #2 in (Belgium) Oudenaarde
  - Elite winners: (Belgium) Wout van Aert (m) / (Belgium) Jolien Verschueren (f)
  - U-23 winner: (Belgium) Eli Iserbyt
  - Junior winner: (United Kingdom) Thomas Mein
- November 27, 2016: #3 in (Belgium) Hamme
  - Elite winners: (Netherlands) Mathieu van der Poel (m) / (Belgium) Sanne Cant (f)
  - U-23 winner: (Belgium) Quinten Hermans
  - Junior winner: (United Kingdom) Thomas Pidcock
- December 10, 2016: #4 in (Germany) Essen
  - Elite winners: (Belgium) Wout van Aert (m) / (Belgium) Sanne Cant (f)
  - U-23 winner: (Belgium) Eli Iserbyt
  - Junior winner: (Belgium) Jelle Camps
- December 17, 2016: #5 in (Belgium) Antwerp
  - Elite winners: (Netherlands) Mathieu van der Poel (m) / (Belgium) Sanne Cant (f)
  - U-23 winner: (Belgium) Quinten Hermans
  - Junior winner: (Belgium) Arne Vrachten
- December 29, 2016: #6 in (Belgium) Loenhout
  - Elite winners: (Netherlands) Mathieu van der Poel (m) / (Belgium) Sanne Cant (f)
  - U-23 winner: (Belgium) Eli Iserbyt
  - Junior winner: (Belgium) Toon Vandebosch
- January 1: #7 in (Belgium) Baal
  - Elite winners: (Belgium) Toon Aerts (m) / (Netherlands) Marianne Vos (f)
  - U-23 winner: (Belgium) Eli Iserbyt
  - Junior winner: (Belgium) Jelle Camps
- February 4: #8 (final) in (Belgium) Lille
  - Elite winners: (Netherlands) Mathieu van der Poel (m) / (Netherlands) Maud Kaptheijns (f)
  - U-23 winner: (Belgium) Quinten Hermans
  - Junior winner: (Belgium) Florian Vermeersch

== Cycling – Mountain Bike ==
=== World mountain biking events ===
- June 24 & 25: 2017 UCI Mountain Bike Marathon World Championships in (Germany) Singen
  - Elite winners: (Austria) Alban Lakata (m) / (Denmark) Annika Langvad (f)
- September 5–10: 2017 UCI Mountain Bike World Championships in (Australia) Cairns
  - Switzerland won the gold medal tally. Switzerland and France won 8 overall medals each.

=== Continental mountain biking events ===
- March 10–12: 2017 Oceania Continental Championships in (Australia) Toowoomba
  - Elite XCO winners: (New Zealand) Anton Cooper (m) / (New Zealand) Samara Sheppard (f)
  - U23 XCO winners: (Australia) Ben Bradley (m) / (Australia) Megan Williams (f)
  - Juniors XCO winners: (Australia) Sam Fox (m) / (New Zealand) Jessica Manchester (f)
  - Elite Downhill winners: (Australia) Josh Button (m) / (Australia) Danielle Beecroft (f)
  - Juniors Downhill winners: (Australia) Joshua Clark (m) / (New Zealand) Shania Rawson (f)
- March 29 – April 2: 2017 American Continental Championships in (Colombia) Paipa–Boyacá
  - Elite XCO winners: (Argentina) Catriel Soto (m) / (United States) Erin Huck (f)
  - U23 XCO winners: (Mexico) Gerardo Ulloa (m) / (Argentina) Luciana Roland (f)
  - Juniors XCO winners: (Chile) Martin Vidaurre Kossman (m) / (Mexico) Mónica Rodríguez (f)
  - XCE winners: (Colombia) Santiago Mesa Pietralunga (m) / (Ecuador) Michela Molina (f)
  - Elite Downhill winners: (Colombia) Rafael Gutiérrez Villegas (m) / (Mexico) Lorena Dromundo (f)
  - Juniors Downhill winners: (Brazil) Maicon Jesus Pradella (m) / (Colombia) Maria Sánchez Gómez (f)
  - XCR winners: Mexico (Gerardo Ulloa, Rafael Escárcega, Daniela Campuzano, Monserrath Rodríguez Suárez, Fernando Islas López)
- May 9 – 14: 2017 African Mountain Bike Continental Championships in Mauritius
  - Elite XCO winners: (South Africa) Alan Hatherly (m) / (Namibia) Michelle Vorster (f)
  - Men's Junior XCO winner: (South Africa) Rossouw Bekker
  - U23 XCO winners: (Namibia) Tristan de Lange (m) / (Zimbabwe) Skye Davidson (f)
  - Women's Elite XCM winner: (Mauritius) Aurelie Halbwachs
- May 13 & 14: 2017 Asian Continental Championships in Xuancheng
  - Men's Elite XCO winner: (China) LYU Xianjing
  - Junior XCO winners: (South Korea) KIM Mi-no (m) / (Japan) Urara Kawaguchi (f)
  - Elite Downhill winners: (Japan) Yuki Kushima (m) / (Thailand) Vipavee Deekaballes (f)
  - Mixed Elite XCR winners: China (MA Hao, Bieken Nazaerbieke, XU Duibing, WEI Qianqian, WANG Zhen)
- May 27 & 28: 2017 European Continental Championships (DHI only) in (Italy) Sestola
  - Elite Downhill winners: (France) Florent Payet (m) / (Italy) Eleonora Farina (f)
- July 27–30: 2017 European Continental Championships (XCO, XCE, & XCR only) in (Turkey) Istanbul
  - Elite XCO winners: (Switzerland) Florian Vogel (m) / (Ukraine) Yana Belomoyna (f)
  - Junior XCO winners: (Spain) Jofre Cullell Estape (m) / (Austria) Laura Stigger (f)
  - U23 XCO winners: (Italy) Gioele Bertolini (m) / (Switzerland) Sina Frei (f)
  - Elite XCE winners: (France) Titouan Perrin Ganier (m) / (Switzerland) Kathrin Stirnemann (f)
  - Mixed Elite XCR winners: Switzerland (Joel Roth, Linda Indergand, Filippo Colombo, Alessandra Keller, Andri Frischknecht)
- August 27 & 28: 2017 Masters DHI MTB European Championships in (Italy) Sestola
  - Masters winners: (Poland) Micha Sliwa (m) / (Switzerland) Alice Kuhne (f)
- December 10: 2017 MTB Beachrace European Championships in (Netherlands) Scheveningen
  - Elite winners: (Netherlands) Jasper Ockeloen (m) / (Netherlands) Riejanne Markus (f)

=== 2017 UCI Mountain Bike World Cup ===
- April 29 & 30: #1 in (France) Lourdes
  - Elite downhill winners: (France) Alexandre Fayolle (m) / (United Kingdom) Rachel Atherton (f)
  - Junior downhill winners: (Canada) Finnley Iles (m) / (France) Mélanie Chappaz (f)
- May 20 & 21: #2 in (Czech Republic) Nové Město na Moravě
  - Elite XCO winners: (Switzerland) Nino Schurter (m) / (Denmark) Annika Langvad (f)
  - U23 XCO winners: (Norway) Petter Fagerhaug (m) / (United States) Kate Courtney (f)
- May 27 & 28: #3 in (Germany) Albstadt
  - Elite XCO winners: (Switzerland) Nino Schurter (m) / (Ukraine) Yana Belomoyna (f)
  - U23 XCO winners: (Italy) Nadir Colledani (m) / (United Kingdom) Evie Richards (f)
- June 3 & 4: #4 in (United Kingdom) Fort William
  - Elite downhill winners: (South Africa) Greg Minnaar (m) / (Australia) Tracey Hannah (f)
  - Junior downhill winners: (United Kingdom) Matt Walker (m) / (United Kingdom) Megan James (f)
- June 10 & 11: #5 in (Austria) Leogang
  - Elite downhill winners: (United States) Aaron Gwin (m) / (United Kingdom) Tahnee Seagrave (f)
  - Junior downhill winners: (Canada) Finnley Iles (m) / (Latvia) Paula Zibasa (f)
- July 1 & 2: #6 in (Andorra) Vallnord
  - Elite XCO winners: (Switzerland) Nino Schurter (m) / (Ukraine) Yana Belomoyna (f)
  - U23 XCO winners: (Denmark) Simon Andreassen (m) / (Switzerland) Sina Frei (f)
  - Elite downhill winners: (Australia) Troy Brosnan (m) / (France) Myriam Nicole (f)
  - Junior downhill winners: (Canada) Finnley Iles (m) / (United Kingdom) Megan James (f)
- July 8 & 9: #7 in (Switzerland) Lenzerheide
  - Elite downhill winners: (South Africa) Greg Minnaar (m) / (France) Myriam Nicole (f)
  - Junior downhill winners: (Canada) Finnley Iles (m) / (Latvia) Paula Zibasa (f)
- August 5 & 6: #8 in (Canada) Mont-Sainte-Anne
  - Elite XCO winners: (Switzerland) Nino Schurter (m) / (Ukraine) Yana Belomoyna (f)
  - U23 XCO winners: (Latvia) Martins Blums (m) / (United States) Kate Courtney (f)
  - Elite downhill winners: (United States) Aaron Gwin (m) / (United Kingdom) Tahnee Seagrave (f)
  - Junior downhill winners: (Canada) Finnley Iles (m) / (France) Mélanie Chappaz (f)
- August 26 & 27: #9 (final) in (Italy) Val di Sole
  - Elite XCO winners: (Switzerland) Nino Schurter (m) / (Switzerland) Jolanda Neff (f)
  - U23 XCO winners: (Italy) Nadir Colledani (m) / (United States) Kate Courtney (f)
  - Elite downhill winners: (United States) Aaron Gwin (m) / (United Kingdom) Tahnee Seagrave (f)
  - Junior downhill winners: (Canada) Finnley Iles (m) / (France) Mélanie Chappaz (f)

== Cycling – Para-cycling ==
=== Para-cycling Road World Championships ===
- August 31 – September 3: 2017 UCI Para-cycling Road World Championships in (South Africa) Pietermaritzburg
  - For results, click here.

=== 2017 UCI Para-cycling Road World Cup ===
- May 11 – 14: PARAWC #1 in (Italy) Maniago
- May 19 – 21: PARAWC #2 in (Belgium) Ostend
- June 30 – July 2: PARAWC #3 (final) in (Netherlands) Emmen
- Note: The results for all three events mentioned above, click here.

=== 2017 Para-cycling European Cup ===
- April 8 & 9: PARAEC #1 in (Serbia) Šid
  - For full results click, here.
- July 15 & 16: PARAEC #2 in (Germany) Elzach
- September 16 & 17: PARAEC #3 in (Serbia) Belgrade
- September 30 & October 1: PARAEC #4 (final) in (Czech Republic) Prague

== Cycling – Road ==
=== UCI Road World Championships ===
- September 16–24: 2017 UCI Road World Championships in (Norway) Bergen
  - The Netherlands won the gold medal tally. Italy won the overall medal tally.

=== Continental cycling championships ===
- February 13 – 19: 2017 African Continental Cycling Championships in Egypt
  - Elite Road Race winners: (South Africa) Willie Smit (m) / (Mauritius) Aurelie Halbwachs (f)
  - Juniors Road Race winners: (Algeria) Hamza Mansouri (m) / (Ethiopia) Haftu Hailu Zayd (f)
  - Elite ITT winners: (Eritrea) Meron Teshome (m) / (Mauritius) Aurelie Halbwachs (f)
  - Elite TTT winners: Eritrea (m) / Eritrea (f)
  - Juniors ITT winners: (Algeria) Hamza Mansouri (m) / (Ethiopia) Kasahun Tsadkan Gebremedhn (f)
  - Juniors TTT winners: Algeria (m) / Egypt (f)
- February 25 – March 2: 2017 Asian Cycling Championships in Bahrain
  - Elite Road Race winners: (South Korea) Park Sang-hong (m) / (Hong Kong) Yang Qianyu (f)
  - U23 Road Race winners: (Japan) Hayato Okamoto (m) / (Chinese Taipei) Chiayun Li (f)
  - Juniors Road Race winners: (Kazakhstan) Daniil Marukhin (m) / (China) Chang Yue (f)
  - Elite ITT winners: (Kazakhstan) Dmitriy Gruzdev (m) / (China) Liang Hongyu (f)
  - U23 ITT winners: (Japan) Rei Onodera (m) / (Kazakhstan) Yekaterina Yuraitis (f)
  - Juniors ITT winners: (Kazakhstan) Igor Chzhan (m) / (China) Qiao Kang (f)
  - Elite TTT winners: Kazakhstan
- March 9–11: 2017 Oceanian Cycling Championships in Australia
  - Elite Road Race winners: (Australia) Sean Lake (m) / (Australia) Lisen Hockings (f)
  - Juniors Road Race winners: (Australia) Sebastian Berwick (m) / (Australia) Madeleine Fasnacht (f)
  - Men's U23 Road Race winner: (Australia) Lucas Hamilton
  - Elite ITT winners: (Australia) Sean Lake (m) / (Australia) Lucy Kennedy (f)
  - U23 ITT winners: (Australia) Liam Magennis (m) / (Australia) Jaime Gunning (f)
- May 4 – 7: 2017 Pan American Road and Track Championships in the Dominican Republic
  - Women's Elite Road Race winner: (Chile) Paola Muñoz
  - Men's U23 Road Race winner: (Chile) Matias Muñoz
  - Men's U23 ITT winner: (Costa Rica) Jose Alexis Roderiguez Villalobos
  - Elite ITT winners: (Chile) José Luis Rodríguez Aguilar (m) / (United States) Chloé Dygert (f)
- August 2–6: 2017 European Road Championships in Denmark
  - Elite Road Race winners: (Norway) Alexander Kristoff (m) / (Netherlands) Marianne Vos (f)
  - Junior Road Race winners: (Italy) Michele Gazzoli (m) / (Netherlands) Lorena Wiebes (f)
  - U23 Road Race winners: (Denmark) Casper Pedersen (m) / (Denmark) Pernille Mathiesen (f)
  - Elite ITT winners: (Belgium) Victor Campenaerts (m) / (Netherlands) Ellen van Dijk (f)
  - Junior ITT winners: (Norway) Andreas Leknessund (m) / (Italy) Elena Pirrone (f)
  - U23 ITT winners: (Denmark) Kasper Asgreen (m) / (Denmark) Pernille Mathiesen (f)

=== Grand Tours ===
- May 5 – 28: 2017 Giro d'Italia
  - Winner: (Netherlands) Tom Dumoulin (Team Sunweb) (first Grand Tour win)
- July 1–23: 2017 Tour de France
  - Winner: (United Kingdom) Chris Froome (Team Sky) (fourth Grand Tour win)
- August 19 – September 10: 2017 Vuelta a España
  - Winner: (United Kingdom) Chris Froome (Team Sky) (first Vuelta a España win; fifth Grand Tour win)

=== UCI World Tour ===
- Overall winner: (Belgium) Greg Van Avermaet (BMC Racing Team)

=== UCI Women's WorldTour ===
- Overall winner: (Netherlands) Anna van der Breggen (Boels–Dolmans)

=== UCI Continental Tours ===
- October 22, 2016 – October 22, 2017: 2017 UCI Asia Tour Overall winner: (Spain) Benjamín Prades (Team UKYO)
- October 24, 2016 – November 5: 2017 UCI America Tour Overall winner: (Romania) Serghei Țvetcov (Jelly Belly–Maxxis)
- October 28, 2016 – November 5: 2017 UCI Africa Tour Overall winner: (South Africa) Willie Smit (Team UC Nantes Atlantique)
- January 22 – March 11: 2017 UCI Oceania Tour Overall winner: (Australia) Lucas Hamilton (Mitchelton Scott)
- January 26 – October 17: 2017 UCI Europe Tour Overall winner: (France) Nacer Bouhanni (Cofidis)

== Cycling – Track ==
=== International track cycling events ===
- February 6 – 10: 2017 Asian Cycling Championships in (India) New Delhi
  - Hong Kong won the gold medal tally. South Korea won the overall medal tally.
- March 20–24: 2017 African Track Cycling Championships in Durban
  - South Africa won both the gold and overall medal tallies.
- April 12 – 16: 2017 UCI Track Cycling World Championships in Hong Kong
  - Australia, France, and Russia won 3 gold medals each. Australia won the overall medal tally.
- October 19–22: 2017 UEC European Track Championships in Berlin
  - Germany and France won 5 gold medals each. Germany won the overall medal tally.

=== 2016–17 UCI Track Cycling World Cup ===
- November 4–6, 2016: #1 in (United Kingdom) Glasgow
  - Keirin winners: (Czech Republic) Tomáš Bábek (m) / (Lithuania) Simona Krupeckaitė (f)
  - Madison winners: Spain (m) / Great Britain (f)
  - Sprint winners: (Poland) Kamil Kuczyński (m) / (Lithuania) Simona Krupeckaitė (f)
  - Team pursuit winners: Great Britain (m) / Great Britain (f)
  - Team sprint winners: Great Britain (m) / Spain (f)
  - Men's Points race: (Australia) Cameron Meyer
  - Men's 4 km individual pursuit: (France) Sylvain Chavanel
  - Women's Scratch winner: (France) Élise Delzenne
- November 11–13, 2016: #2 in (Netherlands) Apeldoorn
  - Keirin winners: (Czech Republic) Tomáš Bábek (m) / (Ukraine) Lyubov Shulika (f)
  - Sprint winners: (Ukraine) Andriy Vynokurov (m) / (Hong Kong) Lee Wai Sze (f)
  - Team sprint winners: Great Britain (m) / Spain (f)
  - Men's Madison winners: Belgium
  - Men's Omnium winner: (Poland) Szymon Sajnok
  - Men's Scratch winner: (Belarus) Raman Ramanau
  - Men's team pursuit winners: Canada
  - Women's 500 m time trial winner: (Germany) Pauline Grabosch
  - Women's Points race: (United Kingdom) Elinor Barker
- February 17 – 19: #3 in (Colombia) Cali
  - Keirin winners: (Colombia) Fabián Puerta (m) / (Germany) Kristina Vogel (f)
  - Omnium winners: (Australia) Sam Welsford (m) / (Belgium) Lotte Kopecky (f)
  - Points race winners: (Republic of Ireland) Mark Downey (m) / (Australia) Amy Cure (f)
  - Sprint winners: (Russia) Denis Dmitriev (m) / (Germany) Kristina Vogel
  - Team pursuit winners: Denmark (m) / Australia (f)
  - Team sprint winners: Germany (m) / Germany (f)
  - Men's 1 km Time Trial winner: (Poland) Krzysztof Maksel
  - Men's Madison winners: Denmark
  - Women's Scratch winner: (United States) Sarah Hammer
- February 25 & 26: #4 (final) in Los Angeles
  - Keirin winners: (Colombia) Fabián Puerta (m) / (Germany) Kristina Vogel (f)
  - Madison winners: Ireland (m) / Australia (f)
  - Scratch Winners: (Belarus) Yauheni Karaliok (m) / (Ukraine) Tetyana Klimchenko (f)
  - Sprint winners: (Russia) Denis Dmitriev (m) / (Germany) Kristina Vogel (f)
  - Team sprint winners: New Zealand (m) / Russia (f)
  - Men's Omnium winner: (Poland) Szymon Sajnok
  - Women's Pursuit winner: (United States) Chloé Dygert
  - Women's team pursuit winners: The United States

== Cycling – Trials ==
=== 2017 UCI Trials World Cup ===
- May 20 & 21: Trials WC #1 in (Belgium) Aalter
  - 20" winners: (Spain) Abel Mustieles Garcia (m) / (Germany) Nina Reichenbach (f)
  - 26" winner: (France) Gilles Coustellier
- July 8 & 9: Trials WC #2 in (Austria) Vöcklabruck
  - 20" winners: (Spain) Abel Mustieles Garcia (m) / (Germany) Nina Reichenbach (f)
  - 26" winner: (United Kingdom) Jack Carthy
- July 29 & 30: Trials WC #3 in (France) Les Menuires
  - 20" winners: (Spain) Benito Jose Ros Charral (m) / (France) Manon Basseville (f)
  - 26" winner: (France) Nicolas Vallee
- August 26 & 27: Trials WC #4 in (France) Albertville
  - 20" winners: (Spain) Abel Mustieles Garcia (m) / (Germany) Nina Reichenbach (f)
  - 26" winner: (France) Gilles Coustellier
- September 23 & 24: Trials WC #5 (final) in (Belgium) Antwerp
  - 20" winners: (Spain) Abel Mustieles Garcia (m) / (Germany) Nina Reichenbach (f)
  - 26" winner: (United Kingdom) Jack Carthy
