= Eritrean National Time Trial Championships =

National road cycling championship in Eritrea

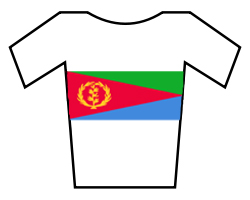
The champion's jersey

The Eritrean National Time Trial Championships are held annually to decide the cycling champions in the individual time trial discipline, across various categories.

== Men ==
=== Elite ===
Year	Gold	Silver	Bronze
2011	Daniel Teklehaimanot	Ferekalsi Debesay	Jani Tewelde
2012	Daniel Teklehaimanot	Meron Russom	Jani Tewelde
2013	Metkel Kiflay	Meron Russom	Tesfom Okubamariam
2014	Natnael Berhane	Mekseb Debesay	Meron Teshome
2015	Daniel Teklehaimanot	Meron Teshome	Natnael Berhane
2016	Daniel Teklehaimanot	Meron Teshome	Merhawi Kudus
2017	Mekseb Debesay	Natnael Berhane	Daniel Teklehaimanot
2018	Daniel Teklehaimanot	Zemenfes Solomon	Aron Debretsion
2019	Amanuel Ghebreigzabhier	Sirak Tesfom	Merhawi Kudus
2020	Not held due to the COVID-19 pandemic in Eritrea		
2021	Merhawi Kudus	Mekseb Debesay	Dawit Yemane
2022	Biniam Girmay	Merhawi Kudus	Amanuel Ghebreigzabhier
2023	Amanuel Ghebreigzabhier	Merhawi Kudus	Aklilu Arefayne
2024	Amanuel Ghebreigzabhier	Henok Mulubrhan	Biniam Girmay

=== U23 ===
Year	Gold	Silver	Bronze
2015	Merhawi Kudus	Metkel Eyob	Yonas Tekeste
2016	Merhawi Kudus	Amanuel Ghebreigzabhier	Robel Tewolde
2017	Meron Abraham	Zemenfes Solomon	Saymon Musie
2018	Zemenfes Solomon	Awet Habtom	Saymon Musie
2019	Biniam Girmay	Yakob Debesay	Daniel Habtemichael
2020	Not held due to the COVID-19 pandemic in Eritrea		
2021	Mengis Petros	Sela Weldemicael	Mehari Tewelde
2022	Biniam Girmay	Mengis Petros	Nahom Kifle
2023	Aklilu Arefayne	Petros Mengis	Hebron Berhene
2024	Nahom Efriem		

== Women ==
Year	Gold	Silver	Bronze
2013	Wehazit Kidane	Tsehainesh Fitsum	Senait Mengistab
2014	Wehazit Kidane	Mossana Debesai	Tsehaynesh Fitsum
2015	Mossana Debesai	Wegaheta Gebrihiwt	Yohana Fetwi
2016	Mossana Debesai	Yohana Dawit Mengis	Wegaheta Gebrihiwt
2017	Mossana Debesai	Wegaheta Gebrihiwt	Wehazit Kidane
2018	Not held		
2019	Desiet Kidane	Adiam Tesfalem	Mossana Debesai
2020	Not held due to the COVID-19 pandemic in Eritrea		
2021	Adyam Tesfalem	Danait Fitsum	Birihit Fissaye
2022	Danait Fitsum	Adiam Dawit	Milena Gebrekrstos
2023	Adiam Dawit	Berikti Fesehaye	Monaliza Araya
2024	Adiam Dawit	Milena Yafet	Suzana Fesehaye

== See also ==
- Eritrean National Road Race Championships
- National road cycling championships
