= Henok Mulubrhan =

Eritrean cyclist (born 1999)

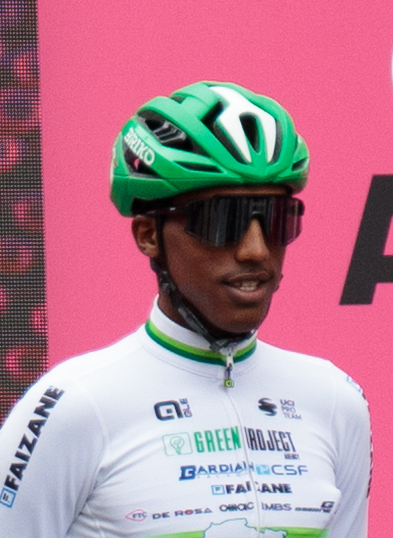
- Mulubrhan at the 2023 Giro d'Italia

Personal information
- Born: 11 November 1999 (age 26) Asmara, Eritrea
- Height: 1.76 m (5 ft 9 in)
- Weight: 60 kg (132 lb)

Cycling career
- Sport: Cycling
- Current team: XDS Astana Team
- Discipline: Road
- Role: Rider
- Rider type: Puncheur

Amateur team
- 2018–2019: World Cycling Centre

Professional teams
- 2020–2021: NTT Continental Cycling Team
- 2022: Bike Aid
- 2022–2023: Bardiani–CSF–Faizanè
- 2024–: Astana Qazaqstan Team

Major wins
- Stage races Tour of Qinghai Lake (2023, 2025) One-day races and Classics African Road Race Championships (2022, 2023, 2024)

Henok Mulubrhan (born 11 November 1999) is an Eritrean cyclist, who currently rides for UCI WorldTeam XDS Astana Team.

== Career ==
Originally from Asmara, Henok started cycling with mountain biking. He entered his first competitions in 2014. In 2016, he represented his country at the UCI World Junior Championships in Doha. During the 2018 season, he placed in the top 10 on four stages of the La Tropicale Amissa Bongo. He then won the fourth stage of the Tour de l'Espoir followed by being crowned the Eritrean national under-23 road race champion. He also won the silver medal in the road race at the African under-23 road championships. In July 2018, he joined the World Cycling Centre program based in Switzerland. The following season, he was crowned the African under-23 road race champion.

In 2020, Henok joined UCI Continental team NTT Continental Cycling Team, which acted as the development squad for UCI WorldTeam NTT Pro Cycling. With this team, he achieved top ten overall finishes in the La Tropicale Amissa Bongo and the Tour du Rwanda. He stayed with the team in 2021, and saw some success on the Italian circuit, including a second place finish at the Giro del Medio Brenta.

He was then signed to step up to the UCI WorldTeam, Team Qhubeka Assos for the 2022 season. However, the team folded at the end of 2021, leaving him without a contract. He ended up joining Bike Aid until the end of March, before being signed by UCI ProTeam Bardiani–CSF–Faizanè in April. This season, he notably won the elite road race at the African road championships. He ended the season at the Giro di Lombardia, which was both the first UCI WorldTour race and Monument that he had competed in.

For the 2023 season, Henok continued to ride for Green Project–Bardiani–CSF–Faizanè. He started the season at the La Tropicale Amissa Bongo in January, earning two top three stage finishes. The following month, he defended his title of African champion and won a silver medal in the time trial followed by two stage wins and the overall victory at the Tour du Rwanda. In May, he competed in his first Grand Tour: the Giro d'Italia, where he was given the combativity award on stage 7 after being a part of the breakway for most of the stage. He ultimately finished the race 87th overall. The next month, he placed third in the Giro dell'Appennino one-day race. In July, he won a stage and the overall classification at the Tour of Qinghai Lake, an eight-day stage race on the UCI ProSeries calendar. He was selected to compete in the road race at the 2023 UCI Road World Championships, but did not finish the race.

In August 2023, it was announced he would join UCI WorldTeam Astana Qazaqstan Team in 2024 on a two-year contract.

== Major results ==
2018
1st Road race, National Under-23 Road Championships
Tour de l'Espoir

1st Mountains classification
1st Stage 4

Africa Cup

1st Team time trial
4th Time trial
6th Road race

2nd Road race, African Under-23 Road Championships
4th Road race, National Road Championships
7th Road race, African Road Championships
2019
1st Road race, African Under-23 Road Championships
2nd Tour de Berne
5th Road race, African Road Championships
10th Overall La Tropicale Amissa Bongo
2020
5th Overall La Tropicale Amissa Bongo
7th Trofeo Città di San Vendemiano
9th Overall Tour du Rwanda
2021
2nd Giro del Medio Brenta
6th Giro dell'Appennino
7th Overall Giro della Valle d'Aosta
9th Trofeo Piva
9th Giro del Belvedere
2022 (1 pro win)
African Road Championships

1st Road race
1st Team time trial
2nd Time trial

4th Time trial, National Road Championships
5th Overall Tour du Rwanda
6th Overall Tour of Antalya
2023 (6)
African Road Championships

1st Road race
2nd Team time trial
3rd Time trial

1st Overall Tour of Qinghai Lake

1st Points classification
1st Stage 7

1st Overall Tour du Rwanda

1st Stages 3 & 8

3rd Giro dell'Appennino
Combativity award Stage 7 Giro d'Italia
2024 (1)
1st Road race, African Road Championships
2nd Time trial, National Road Championships
2nd Overall Tour of Hainan
4th Overall Tour of Qinghai Lake

1st Points classification

2025 (3)
1st Overall Tour of Magnificent Qinghai

1st Points classification
1st Stage 6

National Road Championships

2nd Time trial
4th Road race

2nd Overall Tour du Rwanda

1st Stage 1

3rd Muscat Classic
4th Overall Tour of Hainan
5th Overall Tour de Kyushu

1st Points classification
1st Stage 3

2026 (2)
National Road Championships

2nd Road race
2nd Time trial

2nd Overall Baku-Khankendi Azerbaijan Cycling Rrace

1st Points classification

3rd Overall Tour of Magnificent Qinghai

1st Points classification
1st Stage 3

8th Overall Tour of Turkiye
8th Muscat Classic
10th Overall Tour du Rwanda

1st Points classification
1st Stage 8

=== Grand Tour general classification results timeline ===
Grand Tour	2023	2024	2026
Giro d'Italia	87	47	
Tour de France	—	—	
Vuelta a España		43	—
