= Eritrean National Road Race Championships =

National road cycling championship in Eritrea

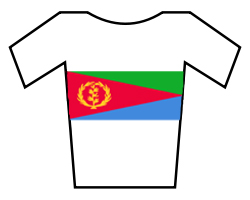
The champion's jersey

The Eritrean National Road Race Championships are held annually to decide the cycling champions in the road race discipline, across various categories.

== Men ==
=== Elite ===
Year	Gold	Silver	Bronze
2008	Daniel Teklehaimanot	Bereket Yemane	Meron Russom
2011	Ferekalsi Debesay	Henok Abraha	Semere Mengis
2012	Daniel Teklehaimanot	Tesfom Okubamariam	Arha Debesay
2013	Meron Teshome	Meron Amanuel	Kindishih Debesay
2014	Amanuel Ghebreigzabhier	Aron Debretsion	Yonas Tekeste
2015	Natnael Berhane	Tesfom Okubamariam	Amanuel Ghebreigzabhier
2016	Daniel Teklehaimanot	Metkel Eyob	Mikiel Habtom
2017	Meron Abraham	Elias Afewerki	Merhawi Kudus
2018	Merhawi Kudus	Amanuel Ghebreigzabhier	Metkel Eyob
2019	Natnael Berhane	Natnael Tesfatsion	Robel Tewelde
2020	Race not held due to the COVID-19 pandemic in Eritrea		
2021	Dawit Yemane	Merhawi Kudus	Metkel Eyob
2026	Milkias Maekele	Henok Mulubrhan	Natnael Tesfatsion
2022	Merhawi Kudus	Natnael Tesfatsion	Niyat Russom

=== U23 ===
Year	Gold	Silver	Bronze
2012	Arha Debesay	Merhawi Kudus	Meron Amanuel
2022	Niyat Russom	Milkias Kudus	Samsom Habte

== Women ==
Year	Gold	Silver	Bronze
2013	Wehazit Kidane	Tsehainesh Fitsum	Yorsalem Ghebru
2014	Wehazit Kidane	Yorsalem Ghebru	Mossana Debesai
2015	Mossana Debesai	Yohana Dawit	Wogahta Gebrehiwet
2016	Yohana Dawit	Alem Beyene	Bisrat Gebremeskel
2017	Wogahta Gebrehiwet	Tigisti Gebrehiwet	Bisrat Gebremeskel
2018	Race not held		
2019	Shama Fitsum	Desiet Kidane	Mossana Debesai
2020	Race not held due to the COVID-19 pandemic in Eritrea		
2021	Bisrat Ghebremeskel	Adiam Dawit	Adyam Tesfalem
2022	Monalisa Araya	Kisanet Weldemichael	Adiam Dawit

== See also ==
- Eritrean National Time Trial Championships
- National road cycling championships
