= Merhawi Kudus =

Eritrean cyclist (born 1994)

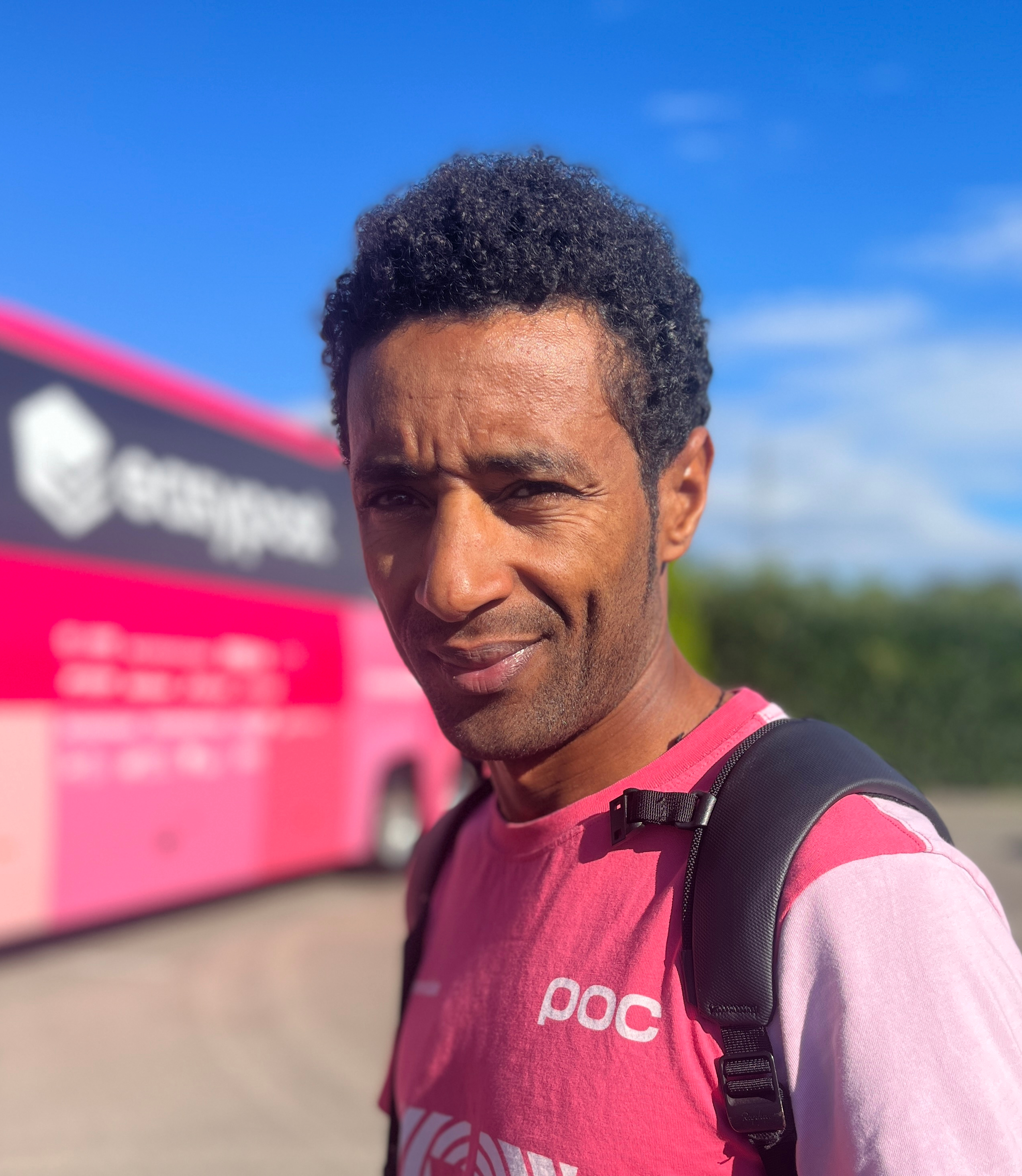
- Kudus at the 2023 Tour de l'Ain

Personal information
- Full name: Merhawi Kudus Ghebremedhin
- Born: 23 January 1994 (age 32) Asmara, Eritrea
- Height: 1.73 m (5 ft 8 in)
- Weight: 58 kg (128 lb; 9.1 st)

Cycling career
- Sport: Cycling
- Current team: Burgos Burpellet BH
- Discipline: Road
- Role: Rider
- Rider type: Climbing specialist

Amateur teams
- 2013: World Cycling Centre
- 2013: Bretagne–Séché Environnement (stagiaire)

Professional teams
- 2014–2018: MTN–Qhubeka
- 2019–2021: Astana
- 2022–2023: EF Education–EasyPost
- 2024: Terengganu Cycling Team
- 2025–: Burgos Burpellet BH

Major wins
- One-day races and Classics African Road Race Championships (2025) National Road Race Championships (2018, 2022) National Time Trial Championships (2021)
Medal record
Men's road cycling
Representing Eritrea
African Road Championships
| Gold medal – first place | 2015 Wartburg | Team time trial |
| Gold medal – first place | 2025 Kwale | Road race |

Merhawi Kudus Ghebremedhin (Tigrinya: መርሃዊ ቕዱስ ገብረመድኅን; born 23 January 1994) is an Eritrean professional cyclist, who currently rides for UCI ProTeam Burgos Burpellet BH. During his professional career, Merhawi has taken seven victories including the African road race championship, three national titles across the road race and time trial, and the general classification at the 2019 Tour du Rwanda.

== Career ==
Born in Asmara, Merhawi was named in the start list for the 2015 Tour de France, becoming one of the first two black Africans to start the Tour alongside teammate and countryman Daniel Teklehaimanot. At the age of 21 Merhawi was the youngest rider in the race. He was named in the start list for the 2016 Giro d'Italia.

He competed in the men's road race at the 2020 Summer Olympics.

Merhawi won the road race at the 2025 African Road Championships, finishing 1-2 with fellow countryman Awet Aman.

== Personal life ==
One of six children, Merhawi's younger brother Milkias has also competed professionally in cycling.

== Major results ==
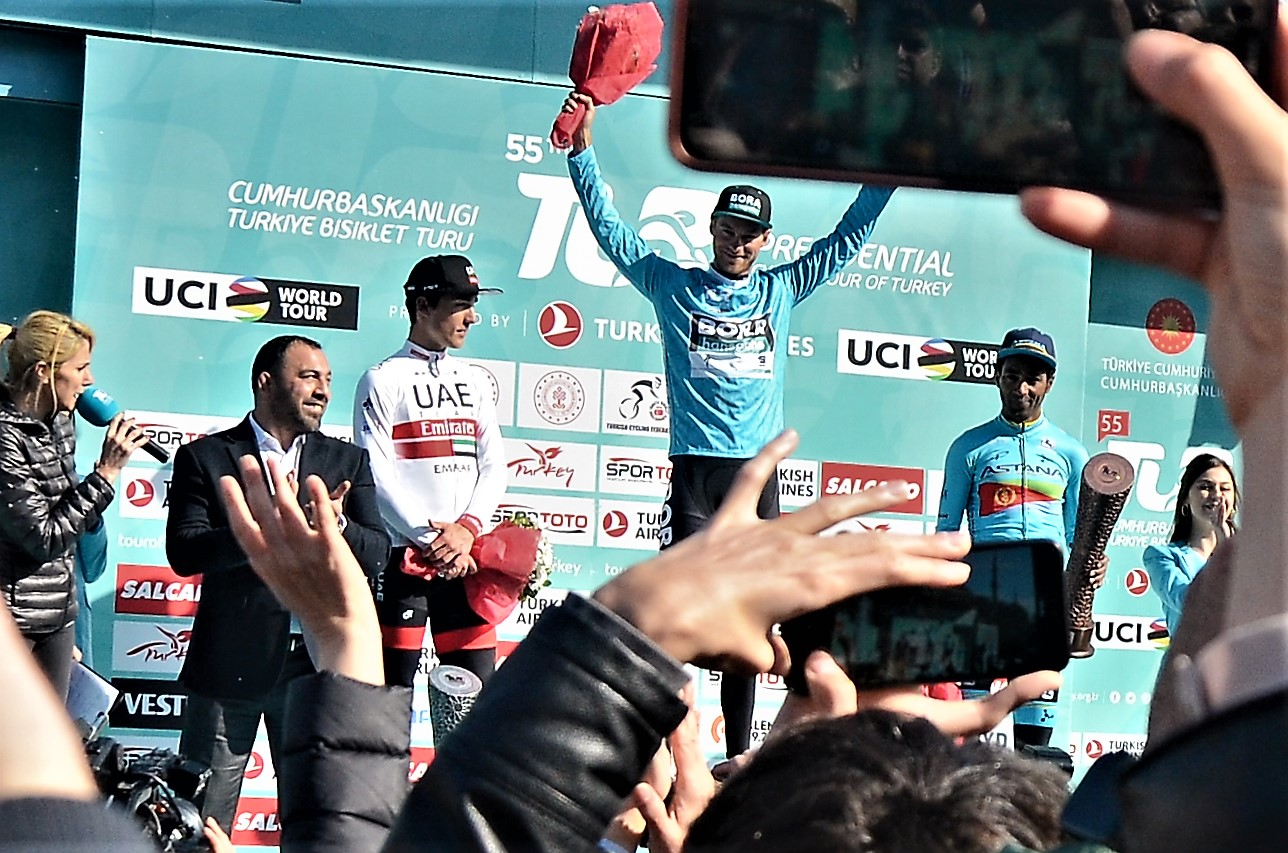
Kudus (right) on the final podium of the 2019 Presidential Tour of Turkey, having finished third overall

2012
6th Overall Tour du Rwanda

1st Stage 1

2013
1st Mountains classification, La Tropicale Amissa Bongo
African Road Championships

2nd Under-23 road race
3rd Road race

2nd Overall Tour of Eritrea

1st Stage 4

2nd Overall Vuelta Ciclista a León

1st Young rider classification

6th Asmara Circuit
8th Overall Fenkil Northern Red Sea Challenge
2014
2nd Overall Tour de Langkawi
3rd Overall Mzansi Tour
5th Overall Route du Sud

1st Young rider classification

2015
African Road Championships

1st Team time trial
1st Under-23 time trial
2nd Under-23 road race
5th Time trial
9th Road race

10th Giro dell'Emilia
10th Trofeo Serra de Tramuntana
2016
3rd Time trial, National Road Championships
6th Trofeo Serra de Tramuntana
9th Overall Tour of Oman
2017
3rd Road race, National Road Championships
4th Overall Tour of Oman

1st Young rider classification

9th Overall Vuelta a Burgos
9th Overall Volta a la Comunitat Valenciana
2018 (1 pro win)
1st Road race, National Road Championships
7th Overall Vuelta a Burgos
9th Overall Tour of Oman
2019 (3)
1st Overall Tour du Rwanda

1st Stages 2 & 3

3rd Time trial, National Road Championships
3rd Overall Presidential Tour of Turkey
6th Road race, African Road Championships
8th Giro della Toscana
2020
8th Overall Settimana Internazionale di Coppi e Bartali
2021 (1)
National Road Championships

1st Time trial
2nd Road race

2nd Overall Adriatica Ionica Race
5th Overall Presidential Tour of Turkey
8th Overall Route d'Occitanie
2022 (1)
National Road Championships

1st Road race
2nd Time trial

2023
2nd Time trial, National Road Championships
5th Overall Tour de l'Ain
2024
African Games

1st Team time trial
2nd Criterium
3rd Road race
3rd Mixed relay
4th Time trial

1st Overall Tour de Banyuwangi Ijen

1st Mountains classification
1st Stage 4

2nd Overall Tour of Turkey
2nd Overall Tour de Kumano
2nd Overall Tour of Japan
5th Road race, National Road Championships
9th Muscat Classic
10th Overall AlUla Tour
2025
African Road Championships

1st Road race
6th Time trial

7th Clàssica Camp de Morvedre
2026
5th Time trial, National Road Championships
7th Overall Pune Grand Tour

=== Grand Tour general classification results timeline ===
| Grand Tour | 2014 | 2015 | 2016 | 2017 | 2018 | 2019 | 2020 | 2021 | 2022 |
|---|---|---|---|---|---|---|---|---|---|
| Giro d'Italia | — | — | 37 | — | — | — | — | — | 61 |
| Tour de France | — | 84 | — | — | — | — | — | — | — |
| Vuelta a España | 92 | — | 38 | DNF | 31 | — | 58 | — | 79 |

Legend
| — | Did not compete |
| DNF | Did not finish |
