= Meron Amanuel =

Eritrean bicycle racer (born 1990)

Personal information
- Full name: Meron Amanuel Mengstab
- Born: 6 November 1990 (age 35) Ethiopia
- Height: 1.78 m (5 ft 10 in)
- Weight: 63 kg (139 lb)

Cycling career
- Sport: Cycling
- Discipline: Road
- Role: Rider
- Rider type: Sprinter

Amateur teams
- 2013: MTN Qhubeka–WCC
- 2017: Sembel

Professional team
- 2014–2016: Bike Aid–Ride for Help

Meron Amanuel Mengstab (born 6 November 1990) is an Eritrean former cyclist.

== Major results ==
2012
Tour of Rwanda

1st Stages 2 & 6

2013
2nd Road race, National Road Championships
3rd Overall Tour of Eritrea

1st Points classification

2016
5th Fenkil Northern Red Sea Challenge
8th Overall Tour Eritrea

1st Points classification
