= Tesfom Okubamariam =

Eritrean cyclist

Personal information
- Full name: Issak Tesfom Okubamariam
- Born: 28 February 1991 (age 35) Mendefera, Ethiopia
- Height: 1.72 m (5 ft 8 in)
- Weight: 60 kg (132 lb)

Cycling career
- Sport: Cycling
- Current team: Yasi Team
- Discipline: Road
- Role: Rider

Amateur teams
- 2015: WCCA Feeder Team
- 2019: Pédale Pilotine
- 2022–: Yasi Cycling Team

Professional teams
- 2016: Sharjah Team
- 2017–2018: Interpro Cycling Academy

Issak Tesfom Okubamariam (born 28 February 1991) is an Eritrean cyclist, who rides for Emirati amateur team Yasi Team.

== Major results ==
2011
1st Stage 4 Tour of Eritrea
2012
Tour d'Algérie

1st Mountains classification
1st Stage 4

National Road Championships

2nd Road race
4th Time trial

4th Overall Tour of Eritrea

1st Stage 3

2013 (1 pro win)
African Road Championships

1st Road race
1st Under-23 road race

National Road Championships

3rd Time trial
6th Road race

5th Overall Tour of Eritrea
7th Circuit of Asmara
7th Fenkel Northern Redsea
2014
6th Time trial, National Road Championships
2015
National Road Championships

2nd Road race
7th Time trial

6th Mayday Classic, KZN Autumn Series
2016 (1)
1st Overall UCI Africa Tour
African Road Championships

1st Road race
1st Team time trial (with Elyas Afewerki, Mekseb Debesay and Amanuel Ghebreigzabhier)

1st Massawa Circuit
3rd Overall Tour du Rwanda

1st Stage 7

3rd Critérium International de Blida
3rd Critérium International d'Alger
4th Overall La Tropicale Amissa Bongo
4th Overall Sharjah International Cycling Tour

1st Mountains classification

6th Overall Tour de Blida
6th Circuit de Constantine
7th Asmara Circuit
9th Overall Tour d'Oranie

1st Mountains classification

9th Overall Tour International de Sétif
9th Fenkil Northern Red Sea Challenge
10th Overall Tour of Eritrea
10th Grand Prix d'Oran
2017
2nd Overall La Tropicale Amissa Bongo
4th Overall Tour of Eritrea
5th Massawa Circuit
9th Overall Tour du Rwanda
9th Fenkil Northern Red Sea Challenge
2018
1st Mountains classification, La Tropicale Amissa Bongo
