= Meron Teshome =

Eritrean cyclist

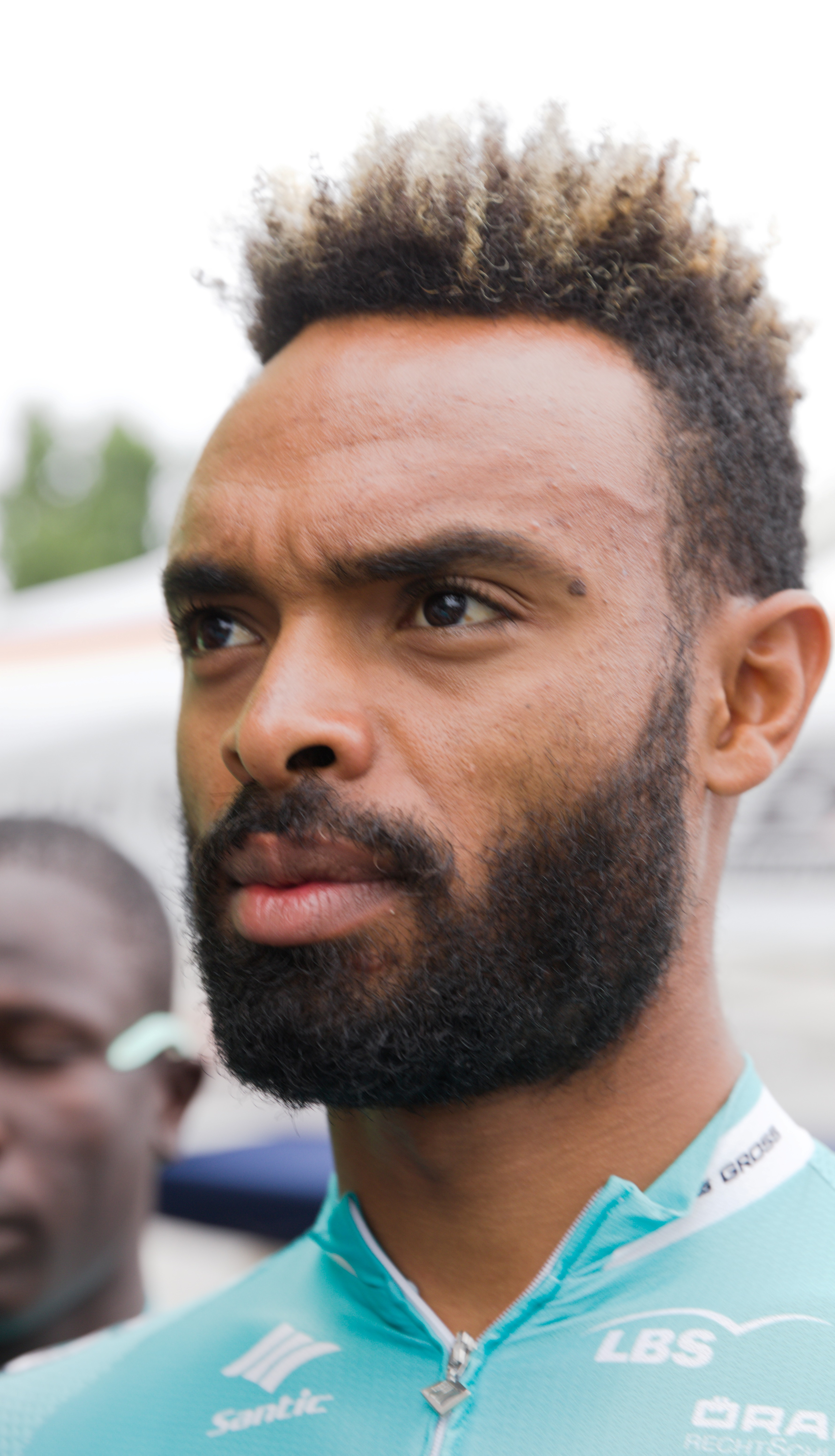
- Meron Teshome (2018)

Personal information
- Full name: Meron Teshome Hagos
- Born: 13 July 1992 (age 34) Asmara, Ethiopia

Cycling career
- Sport: Cycling
- Discipline: Road
- Role: Rider

Professional team
- 2016–2018: Stradalli–Bike Aid
Medal record
Men's cycling
Representing Eritrea
African Games
Gold medal – first place	2015 Brazzaville	Time trial

Meron Teshome Hagos (born 13 July 1992) is an Eritrean cyclist who most recently rode for Bike Aid.

He is the cousin of fellow professional cyclist Biniam Girmay.

== Major results ==
2013 (1 pro win)
African Road Championships

1st Team time trial (with Natnael Berhane, Meron Russom and Daniel Teklehaimanot)
8th Time trial

1st Road race, National Road Championships
4th Overall Tour of Eritrea

1st Stage 1

6th Overall Fenkil Northern Red Sea Challenge
9th Overall La Tropicale Amissa Bongo
2014
National Road Championships

1st Under-23 time trial
3rd Time trial

2015 (1)
African Games

1st Time trial
4th Road race

1st Stage 5 Tour du Rwanda
2nd Time trial, National Road Championships
3rd Hibiscus Cycle Classic, KZN Autumn Series
2016
1st Stage 2 Tour of Eritrea
2nd Time trial, National Road Championships
3rd Massawa Circuit
5th Asmara Circuit
2017 (1)
African Road Championships

1st Time trial
1st Team time trial

2nd Massawa Circuit
4th Asmara Circuit
6th Overall Tour du Cameroun

1st Stages 3 & 5

7th Overall La Tropicale Amissa Bongo
9th Overall Tour of Eritrea

1st Points classification
1st Stages 1 & 3

2019
1st Team time trial, African Road Championships
2023
2nd Grand Prix de la Ville d'Alger
4th Road race, National Road Championships
2024
7th Overall Tour d'Algérie
2025
2nd Road race, National Road Championships
