= Wogahta Gebrehiwet =

Eritrean cyclist

Personal information
- Born: 11 December 1996 (age 29)

Cycling career
- Sport: Cycling
- Current team: Retired
- Discipline: Road
- Role: Rider

Wogahta Gebrehiwet (born 11 December 1996) is an Eritrean former racing cyclist. She rode in the women's road race at the 2016 UCI Road World Championships, but she did not finish the race.

== Major results ==
2015
National Road Championships

2nd Time trial
3rd Road race

2016
African Road Championships

3rd Team time trial
4th Time trial

3rd Time trial, National Road Championships
2017
African Road Championships

1st Team time trial
9th Road race

National Road Championships

1st Road race
2nd Time trial
