= Mossana Debesai =

Eritrean cyclist

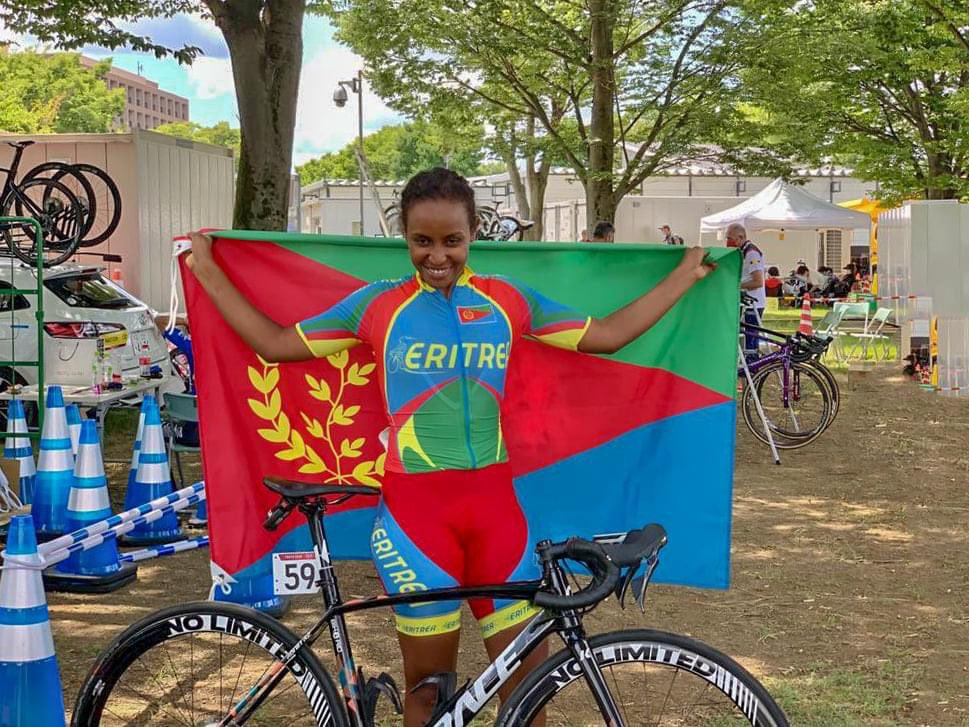

Personal information
- Full name: Mossana Debesai
- Born: 25 November 1993 (age 32) Asmara, Eritrea

Cycling career
- Sport: Cycling
- Discipline: Road
- Role: Rider

Professional team
- 2018–2019: Servetto–Stradalli Cycle–Alurecycling

Mossana Debesai (born 25 November 1993) is an Eritrean professional racing cyclist, who last rode for UCI Women's Team Servetto–Piumate–Beltrami TSA. She competed in the women's road race event at the 2020 Summer Olympics.

She rode in the women's road race at the 2016 UCI Road World Championships. In 2019, she won the African Road Championships road race and in 2018 and the African Road Championships individual time trial. She is the younger sister of Mekseb Debesay who won the men's competition in both events.

== Major results ==
2014
National Road Championships

2nd Time trial
3rd Road race

2015
African Games

1st Time trial
5th Road race

1st Time trial, National Road Championships
African Road Championships

3rd Team time trial
7th Time trial
10th Road race

2016
1st Time trial, National Road Championships
African Road Championships

3rd Team time trial
5th Time trial

2017
African Road Championships

1st Team time trial
2nd Time trial
7th Road race

1st Time trial, National Road Championships
2018
African Road Championships

1st Time trial
2nd Team time trial
3rd Road race

2019
African Road Championships

1st Road race
2nd Team time trial
4th Time trial

African Games

2nd Team time trial
7th Time trial

National Road Championships

3rd Time trial
3rd Road race
