= Dawit Yemane =

Eritrean cyclist (born 1998)

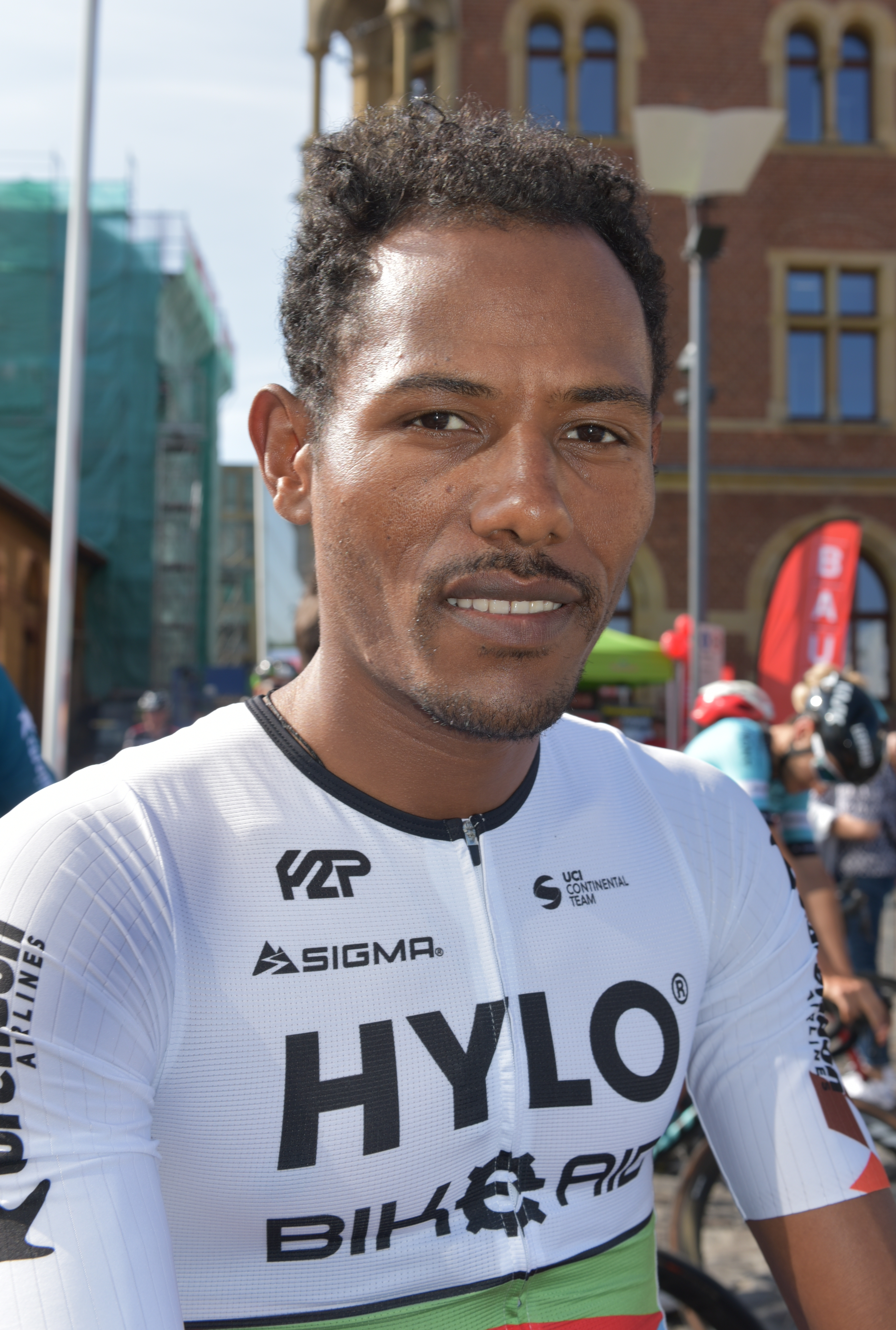
- Dawit Yemane (2022)

Personal information
- Born: 1998 (age 27–28)

Cycling career
- Sport: Cycling
- Current team: Bike Aid
- Discipline: Road
- Role: Rider

Amateur team
- 2018: AS.BE.CO

Professional team
- 2021–: Bike Aid

Major wins
- One-day races and classics National Road Race Championships (2021)

Dawit Yemane (born 1998) is an Eritrean cyclist, who currently rides for UCI Continental team Bike Aid. In 2021, he won the Eritrean National Road Race Championships, and later competed in the road race at the 2021 UCI Road World Championships.

== Major results ==
2017
3rd Overall Tour of Quanzhou Bay

1st Mountains classification

7th Overall Tour Eritrea
2018
2nd Africa Cup
2019
8th Road race, African Games
2020
1st Mountains classification, La Tropicale Amissa Bongo
2021 (1 pro win)
National Road Championships

1st Road race
3rd Time trial

2022
African Road Championships

1st Team time trial
2nd Mixed Relay TTT
4th Time trial

1st Overall Tour de Serbie

1st Stage 3

3rd Overall Tour of Azerbaijan (Iran)
7th Overall Tour of Turkey
8th Flèche Ardennaise
2023
1st Mountains classification, Tour d'Algérie
2nd Classique de l'île Maurice
5th Overall La Tropicale Amissa Bongo
6th Overall Tour de Maurice
7th Overall Tour du Rwanda
8th Overall Tour of Poyang Lake
8th Paris–Troyes
2024
African Games

1st Team time trial
3rd Mixed relay
5th Road race
7th Criterium

1st Stage 1 Tour of Mersin
10th Overall Tour du Rwanda
