= Wehazit Kidane =

Eritrean cyclist

Personal information
- Born: 8 January 1992 (age 34) Ethiopia

Cycling career
- Sport: Cycling
- Discipline: Road
- Role: Rider
Medal record
Women's cycling
Representing Eritrea
African Games
| Silver medal – second place | 2015 Brazzaville | Time trial |

Wehazit Kidane (born 8 January 1992) is a road cyclist from Eritrea. She became Eritrean national road race and time trial champion in 2013 and 2014. She also rode in the women's road race at the 2016 UCI Road World Championships, finishing in 96th place.

== Major results ==
2011
African Road Championships

4th Time trial
5th Road race

2013
National Road Championships

1st Time trial
1st Road race

African Road Championships

2nd Team time trial
2nd Time trial
3rd Road race

2014
National Road Championships

1st Time trial
1st Road race

2015
African Games

2nd Time trial
10th Road race

3rd Team time trial, African Road Championships
2016
African Road Championships

3rd Team time trial
6th Road race

2017
African Road Championships

1st Team time trial
5th Time trial
6th Road race

3rd Time trial, National Road Championships
2018
African Road Championships

2nd Team time trial
6th Road race
