= World Cycling Centre =

Cycling venue in Aigle, Switzerland

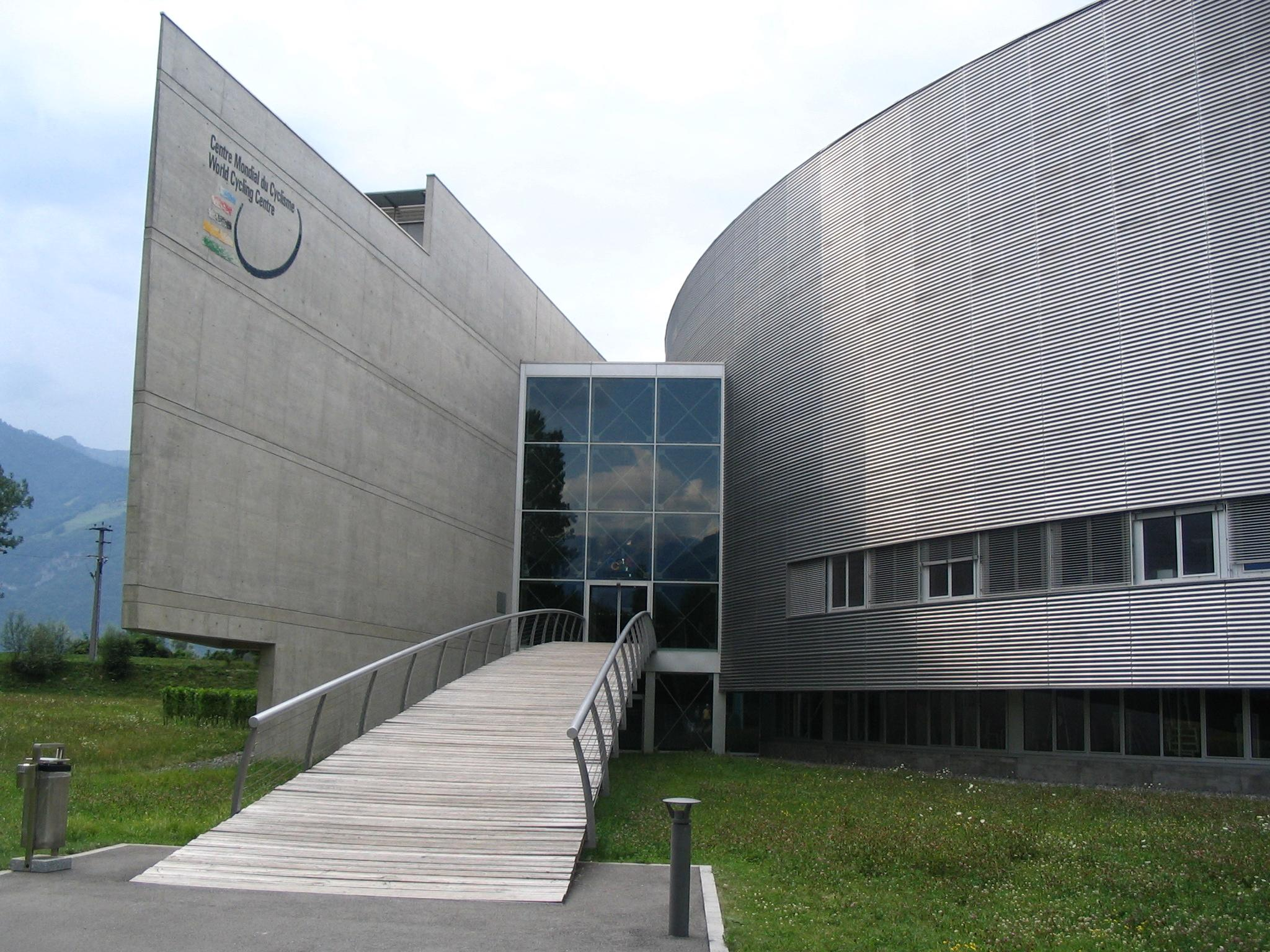
- The main entrance to the World Cycling Centre
- Interactive map of World Cycling Centre
- Location: Aigle, Switzerland
- Coordinates: 46°19′7.24″N 6°56′0.63″E
- Owner: Union Cycliste Internationale

Construction
- Groundbreaking: 2000
- Opened: 2002

The World Cycling Centre (WCC, French: Centre Mondial du Cyclisme) is a coaching and training centre in Aigle, Switzerland. It contains a 200 m (660 ft) indoor velodrome, a BMX racing track and other non-cycling facilities. It was built in 2002 to celebrate the 100th anniversary of the Union Cycliste Internationale (UCI), the world governing body for sports cycling, whose headquarters is located in the main building.

Since its opening over 1,000 training camps have taken place at the centre. In 2015, Rwandan cyclist Jeanne D'arc Girubuntu became the thousandth trainee at the centre – previous graduates include 2015 BMX World Champion Stefany Hernández, Daniel Teklehaimanot, the first black African rider to wear the polka dot jersey at the Tour de France, multiple Tour winner Chris Froome, multiple Olympic and World Champion Victoria Pendleton, World Championship medallists Ross Edgar, Ramūnas Navardauskas and Guo Shuang, and multiple African champion Natnael Berhane. A total of fourteen trainee riders from the WCC were selected to compete for their nations at the 2016 Summer Olympics in Rio de Janeiro. The Centre sometimes fields teams in Under-23 races.

== See also ==
- List of cycling tracks and velodromes
- WCC Team – women's cycling team affiliated with the Centre
