= Zemenfes Solomon =

Eritrean cyclist

Personal information
- Born: 17 March 1997 (age 29) Adi Gombolo, Eritrea

Cycling career
- Sport: Cycling
- Current team: Eritel
- Discipline: Road
- Role: Rider

Amateur team
- 2016–: Eritel

Zemenfes Solomon (born 17 March 1997) is an Eritrean cyclist.

== Palmares ==
2015
1st Junior National Time Trial Championships
2016
3rd Overall Tour du Faso

1st Stages 2, 3,5 & 9
1st Points Classification

2017
2nd Fenkil Northern Red Sea Challenge
