= Istanbul Cycling Team =

Turkish cycling team

Team information
- UCI code: IBB
- Registered: Turkey
- Founded: 2023
- Discipline: Road
- Status: UCI Continental Team

Key personnel
- General manager: Pelin Merve Bayram

Team name history
- 2023 2024–2025 2026–: Beykoz Belediyesi Spor Kulübü; Istanbul Büyükșehir Belediye Spor Türkiye; Istanbul Cycling Team

Istanbul Cycling Team (UCI team code: BGS) is a Turkish UCI Continental cycling team founded in 2023.

== Team roster ==
As of 12 July 2024.

Rider	Date of birth
Natnael Berhane (ERI)	5 January 1991 (age 35)
Samet Bulut (TUR)	18 August 2002 (age 24)
Ali Egin (TUR)	3 May 2003 (age 23)
Muhammed Erkan (TUR)	31 August 2001 (age 25)
Veysel Karani̇ Kaya (TUR)	7 June 1997 (age 29)
Zeki Kaygısız (TUR)	23 April 1998 (age 28)

Rider	Date of birth
Mengis Petros (ERI)	10 March 2002 (age 24)
Batuhan Özgür (TUR)	1 February 1998 (age 28)
Timur Oztoprak (TUR)	24 August 2004 (age 22)
Max Stedman (GBR)	22 March 1996 (age 30)
Arda Tekirdag (TUR)	10 June 2005 (age 21)

== Major wins ==
2023
Grand Prix Apollon Temple, Sergey Rostovtsev
Stage 3 Tour de Maurice, Natnael Berhane
Stage 4 Tour de Maurice, Sergey Rostovtsev
Grand Prix Erciyes - Mimar Sinan, Max Stedman
100th Anniversary Tour of The Republic Mengis Petros

Stage 3 Yaroslav Parashchak

Tour of Yigido Max Stedman

Prologue Tour of Yigido Max Stedman
Stage 2 Tour of Yigido Max Stedman
