= Amanuel Ghebreigzabhier =

Eritrean road cyclist

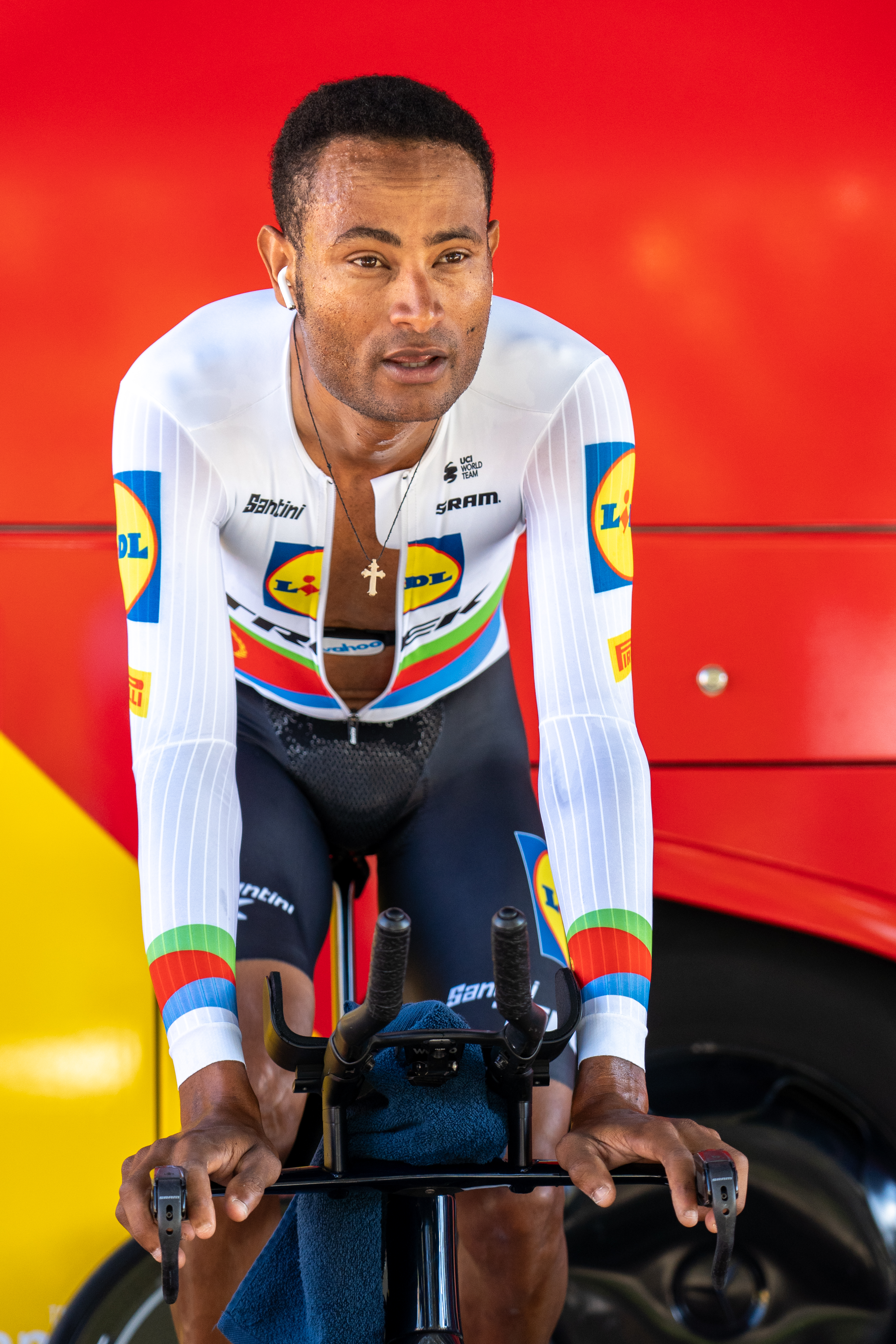
- Amanuel at the 2023 Vuelta a España

Personal information
- Full name: Amanuel Ghebreigzabhier Egerzeigzaarhka
- Nickname: Ema
- Born: 17 August 1994 (age 32) Addis Ababa, Ethiopia
- Height: 1.87 m (6 ft 2 in)
- Weight: 68 kg (150 lb)

Cycling career
- Sport: Cycling
- Current team: Lidl–Trek
- Discipline: Road
- Role: Rider

Amateur team
- 2012–2015: AS.BE.CO

Professional teams
- 2016–2017: Dimension Data for Qhubeka
- 2016: Team Dimension Data (stagiaire)
- 2017: Team Dimension Data (stagiaire)
- 2018–2020: Team Dimension Data
- 2021–: Trek–Segafredo

Major wins
- One-day races and Classics National Road Race Championships (2014) National Time Trial Championships (2019, 2023, 2024)
Medal record
Men's road cycling
Representing Eritrea
African Road Championships
Gold medal – first place	2016 Benslimane	Team time trial
Gold medal – first place	2017 Luxor	Team time trial
Gold medal – first place	2018 Kigali	Road race
Gold medal – first place	2018 Kigali	Team time trial

Amanuel Ghebreigzabhier Egerzeigzaarhka (born 17 August 1994) is an Ethiopian-born Eritrean cyclist, who currently rides for UCI WorldTeam Lidl–Trek.

== Career ==
Amanuel started cycling at the age of 14, first with mountain biking. His first major success was winning the Eritrean national road race championships in 2014 while riding for a club team. In 2016, he joined Dimension Data for Qhubeka, the development team of UCI WorldTeam Team Dimension Data, and was selected to join the WorldTeam as a stagiaire in 2016 and 2017. He joined the team full time the following year, and competed in his first Grand Tour: the 2018 Vuelta a España where he finished 7th on stage 17 and 34th overall. That season, he also won the African road race championship. In 2019, he competed in his first Giro d'Italia and was crowned the national time trial champion.

After NTT Pro Cycling folded at the end of the 2020 season, he was signed by Trek–Segafredo with an initial contract lasting through 2022. In March 2022, he fell heavily during the last stage of the Volta a Catalunya. Hospitalized, he suffered serious contusions to the chest and abdomen, injuries to several organs and broken ribs and vertebrae.

Amanuel had a strong spring in 2023, finishing second in the GP Industria & Artigianato di Larciano before competing in the Giro d'Italia in May. At the Giro, he placed 6th on stage 4 and was presented the combativity award for the day. However, he ultimately abandoned the race after stage 15. In August, he competed in the Vuelta a España, attaining a 4th place finish on stage 9.

While getting a contract for the 2024 season was initially uncertain, Amanuel renewed his contract with Lidl–Trek. He had a strong performance in the Giro, doing important domestique work for Jonathan Milan's successful campaign for the points jersey, as well as making attempts in the breakaway. After his performance in the Giro, his contract was extended through the 2026 season.

== Major results ==
2014 (1 pro win)
National Road Championships

1st Road race
1st Under-23 road race
4th Time trial

1st Overall Tour de Blida

1st Young rider classification
1st Stage 3

1st Stage 4 Tour de Constantine
4th Circuit d'Alger
6th Overall Tour d'Algérie

1st Young rider classification

2015
National Road Championships

1st Under-23 road race
3rd Road race

1st Overall Tour de Constantine

1st Young rider classification

1st Mountains classification, Tour du Rwanda
3rd Grand Prix d'Oran
5th Overall Tour International de Sétif
8th Overall Tour de Blida
9th Circuit d'Alger
2016
African Road Championships

1st Team time trial
5th Road race
7th Time trial

3rd Gran Premio Palio del Recioto
National Road Championships

5th Road race
5th Time trial

5th Overall Tour du Rwanda
2017
1st Team time trial, African Road Championships
2nd Coppa della Pace
2nd Giro del Medio Brenta
6th Overall Tour de Hongrie

1st Mountains classification

7th Trofeo Alcide Degasperi
9th Overall Arctic Race of Norway
2018 (1)
African Road Championships

1st Road race
1st Team time trial

2nd Road race, National Road Championships
4th Overall Tour de Langkawi
2019 (1)
1st Time trial, National Road Championships
6th Overall Vuelta a Burgos
8th Overall Tour of Austria
2021
5th Road race, National Road Championships
9th Overall Settimana Internazionale di Coppi e Bartali
2022
3rd Time trial, National Road Championships
6th Overall Tour des Alpes-Maritimes et du Var
2023 (1)
1st Time trial, National Road Championships
2nd GP Industria & Artigianato di Larciano
Combativity award Stage 4 Giro d'Italia
2024 (1)
1st Time trial, National Road Championships
Combativity award Stage 1 Giro d'Italia
2025
1st Stage 1 (TTT) Volta a la Comunitat Valenciana

=== Grand Tour general classification results timeline ===
Grand Tour	2018	2019	2020	2021	2022	2023	2024	2025
Giro d'Italia	—	45	54	63	—	DNF	63	—
Tour de France	—	—	—	—	—	—	—	—
Vuelta a España	37	DNF	—	—	—	82	—	135

Legend
—	Did not compete
IP	In progress
DNF	Did not finish
