= COVID-19 pandemic in Eritrea =

- Disease: COVID-19
- Pathogen: SARS-CoV-2
- Location: Eritrea
- First outbreak: Wuhan, Hubei, China
- Index case: Asmara
- Arrival date: 21 March 2020
- Confirmed cases: 10,189 (updated 5 Aug 2026)
- Deaths: 103 (updated 5 Aug 2026)

The COVID-19 pandemic in Eritrea is part of the worldwide pandemic of coronavirus disease 2019 (COVID-19) caused by severe acute respiratory syndrome coronavirus 2 (SARS-CoV-2). The virus was confirmed to have reached Eritrea on 21 March 2020. The government introduced strict social distancing measures by end of March 2020 which was enforced until April 2021. In April 2021 the government relaxed restrictions and opened up schools, resumed commercial flights and public transportation.

== Background ==
On 12 January 2020, the World Health Organization (WHO) confirmed that a novel coronavirus was the cause of a respiratory illness in a cluster of people in Wuhan City, Hubei Province, China, which was reported to the WHO on 31 December 2019.

The case fatality rate for COVID-19 has been much lower than SARS of 2003, but the transmission has been significantly greater, with a significant total death toll.

== Timeline ==
=== March 2020 ===
- On 21 March, the first case in Eritrea was confirmed in Asmara; the index case was an Eritrean national arriving from Norway.

=== April to June 2020 ===
- Eritrea announced a 21-day lockdown beginning April 2. That lockdown was subsequently extended further.
- On 9 April, Eritrea recorded two new cases, two Eritreans aged 30 and 62, both of whom had returned to the country before the flight ban, thus bringing the country's total infections to 33.
- The total number of confirmed cases reached 39 in April, 24 more than in March. 26 of the 39 patients recovered in April, leaving 13 active cases at the end of the month.
- On 15 May, the Eritrean Health Ministry confirmed that the 39th and final case of COVID-19 in the country had fully recovered. For the rest of the month there were no active cases.
- On 13 June, a further 31 positive cases were confirmed, 30 of whom had returned from Sudan, and one from Ethiopia. During the month there were 164 positive cases, raising the total number of confirmed cases since the start of the outbreak to 203. 53 patients recovered in June, leaving 150 active cases at the end of the month.

=== July to December 2020 ===
- In July there were 76 new cases, in August 39, in September 57, in October 88, in November 114, and in December 743. The total number of cases stood at 279 in July, 318 in August, 375 in September, 468 in October, 577 in November, and 1320 in December.
- The number of recovered patients grew from 53 to 225 in July, 284 in August, 341 in September, 412 in October, 498 in November, and 676 in December, leaving 54 active cases at the end of July, 34 at the end of August as well as at the end of September, 51 at the end of October, 79 at the end of November, and 641 at the end of December.
- The country announced its first COVID-19-related death on 22 December, followed by two more deaths on 31 December.

=== January to December 2021 ===
- There were 815 new cases in January, 712 in February, 438 in March, 388 in April, 421 in May, 1015 in June, 538 in July, 95 in August, 80 in September, 112 in October, 524 in November, and 653 in December. The total number of cases stood at 2135 in January, 2847 in February, 3285 in March, 3673 in April, 4094 in May, 6009 in June, 6547 in July, 6642 in August, 6722 in September, 6834 in October, 7358 in November, and 8011 in December.
- The number of recovered patients increased to 1594 in January, 2253 in February, 3029 in March, 3496 in April, 3853 in May, 5512 in June, 6444 in July, 6590 in August, 6635 in September, 6732 in October, 7096 in November, and 7746 in December, leaving 534 active cases at the end of January, 587 at the end of February, 246 at the end of March, 165 at the end of April, 227 at the end of May, 474 at the end of June, 68 at the end of July, 14 at the end of August, 45 at the end of September, 57 at the end of October, 202 at the end of November, and 189 at the end of December.
- The death toll rose to 7 in January, 10 in March, 12 in April, 14 in May, 23 in June, 35 in July, 38 in August, 42 in September, 45 in October, 60 in November, and 76 in December.
- Modeling carried out by the WHO's Regional Office for Africa suggests that due to under-reporting, the true cumulative number of infections by the end of 2021 was around 1.6 million while the true number of COVID-19 was around 1130.

=== January to December 2022 ===
- There were 1525 new cases in January, 165 in February, 27 in March, 6 in April, 30 in May, 35 in June, 246 in July, 110 in August, 18 in September, and 16 in October. The total number of cases stood at 9536 in January, 9701 in February, 9728 in March, 9734 in April, 9764 in May, 9799 in June, 10045 in July, 10155 in August, 10173 in September, and 10189 in October.
- The number of recovered patients stood at 9216 in January, 9594 in February, 9623 in March, 9631 in April, 9652 in May, 9683 in June, 9804 in July, 10047 in August, 10065 in September, and 10082 in October, leaving 222 active cases at the end of January, 4 at the end of February, 2 at the end of March, none at end of April, 9 at the end of May, 13 at the end of June, 138 at the end of July, 5 at the end of August as well as at the end of September, and 4 at the end of October.
- The death toll rose to 98 in January and 103 in February.

== Preventive measures ==
As a precautionary measure, the government has urged people not to travel to or from the country, and as of 11 March 2020, was quarantining any incoming travellers who have recently been in Iran, Italy, China, or South Korea.

The government put in guidelines forbidding overcharging on goods during the lockdown. Enforcement of these measured has been reported in jurisdictions like Massawa.

As the pandemic became more serious, the government decreed a nationwide lockdown, banning on all non-essential local and international flights. During the international travel ban, returning Eritreans are subject to mandatory quarantine; as of June 16, 2020 there were 3,405 people still in quarantine across 47 quarantine centers in the country.

By May 2022, Eritrea was one of the last two countries that had yet to start a COVID vaccination program. When the North Korean vaccination program started in its border areas in late September, Eritrea was alone in having no mass vaccination program against COVID-19.

== Diaspora response ==
Diaspora communities have been sending large volumes of money to support relief efforts in the country. For example, Eritrean Americans had sent at least US$4 million by May 2022, according to the US embassy in Eritrea.

== See also ==
- COVID-19 pandemic in Africa
- COVID-19 pandemic by country and territory
