= Massawa Circuit =

Race details
- Date: April
- Discipline: Road
- Competition: UCI Africa Tour
- Type: One day race

History
- First edition: 2016
- Editions: 2 (as of 2017)
- First winner: Tesfom Okubamariam (ERI)
- Most wins: No repeat winners
- Most recent: Simon Musie (ERI)

The Massawa Circuit is a cycling race held annually in Massawa, Eritrea since 2016. It is rated 1.2 and is part of UCI Africa Tour.

== Winners ==
Year	Country	Rider	Team
2016	Eritrea	Tesfom Okubamariam	Eritrea (national team)
2017	Eritrea	Simon Musie	Eritrea (national team)
