= Metkel Eyob =

Eritrean cyclist

Personal information
- Full name: Metkel Eyob
- Born: 4 September 1993 (age 33) Asmara, Eritrea
- Height: 1.76 m (5 ft 9 in)
- Weight: 61 kg (134 lb)

Cycling career
- Sport: Cycling
- Current team: Istanbul Cycling Team
- Discipline: Road
- Role: Rider

Amateur teams
- 2012–2013: AS.BE.CO
- 2015: MTN–Qhubeka WCCA Feeder

Professional teams
- 2016–2017: Dimension Data for Qhubeka
- 2016: Team Dimension Data (stagiaire)
- 2017: Team Dimension Data (stagiaire)
- 2018–2025: Terengganu Cycling Team
- 2026–: Istanbul Cycling Team

Metkel Eyob (born 4 September 1993) is an Eritrean cyclist, who currently rides for UCI Continental team Istanbul Cycling Team.

Eyob were with Terengganu Cycling Team from 2018 to 2025. Prior to that, Asmara-born Eyob rode for two years with Dimension Data for Qhubeka, the development team of Team Dimension Data.

== Major results ==
2013
3rd Overall Tour du Rwanda

1st Mountains classification
1st Stage 6

2014
1st Young rider classification Tour do Rio
10th Overall Mzansi Tour
2015
KZN Autumn Series

1st Hibiscus Cycle Classic
3rd Mayday Classic

4th Overall Tour du Rwanda

1st Stage 7

2016
2nd Road race, National Road Championships
2nd Overall Tour du Rwanda

1st Stage 5

7th Road race, African Road Championships
2017
2nd Overall Tour du Rwanda

1st Stages 4 & 6

9th Overall Tour de Hongrie
2018
African Road Championships

1st Team time trial
2nd Road race

1st Stage 1 Tour de Lombok Mandalika
2nd Overall Tour de Filipinas

1st Mountains classification
1st Stage 4

3rd Road race, National Road Championships
2019 (1 pro win)
3rd Overall Tour of Peninsular
5th Road race, National Road Championships
6th Overall La Tropicale Amissa Bongo
6th Overall Tour de Indonesia

1st Stage 4

9th Overall Tour of Almaty
2021
2nd Grand Prix Gündoğmuş
2nd Kahramanmaraş Grand Prix Road Race
3rd Road race, National Road Championships
3rd Grand Prix Velo Alanya
3rd Grand Prix Kayseri
3rd Grand Prix Develi
6th Overall Tour of Mevlana
9th Grand Prix Erciyes
2022
2nd Grand Prix Gündoğmuş
2nd Grand Prix Kayseri
4th Overall Tour of Thailand
6th Grand Prix Mediterranean
8th Grand Prix Erciyes
10th Overall Tour of Antalya
2023
5th Overall Tour of Azerbaijan (Iran)
5th Tour of Kandovan
6th Overall Tour of Sharjah
2024
2nd Grand Prix de la Ville d'Alger
3rd Road race, National Road Championships
3rd Overall Tour d'Algérie
4th Overall Tour of Turkey
5th Grand Prix de la Ville d'Annaba
