= Daniel Teklehaimanot =

Eritrean racing cyclist (born 1988)

Daniel Teklehaimanot ዳንኤል ተክለሃይማኖት
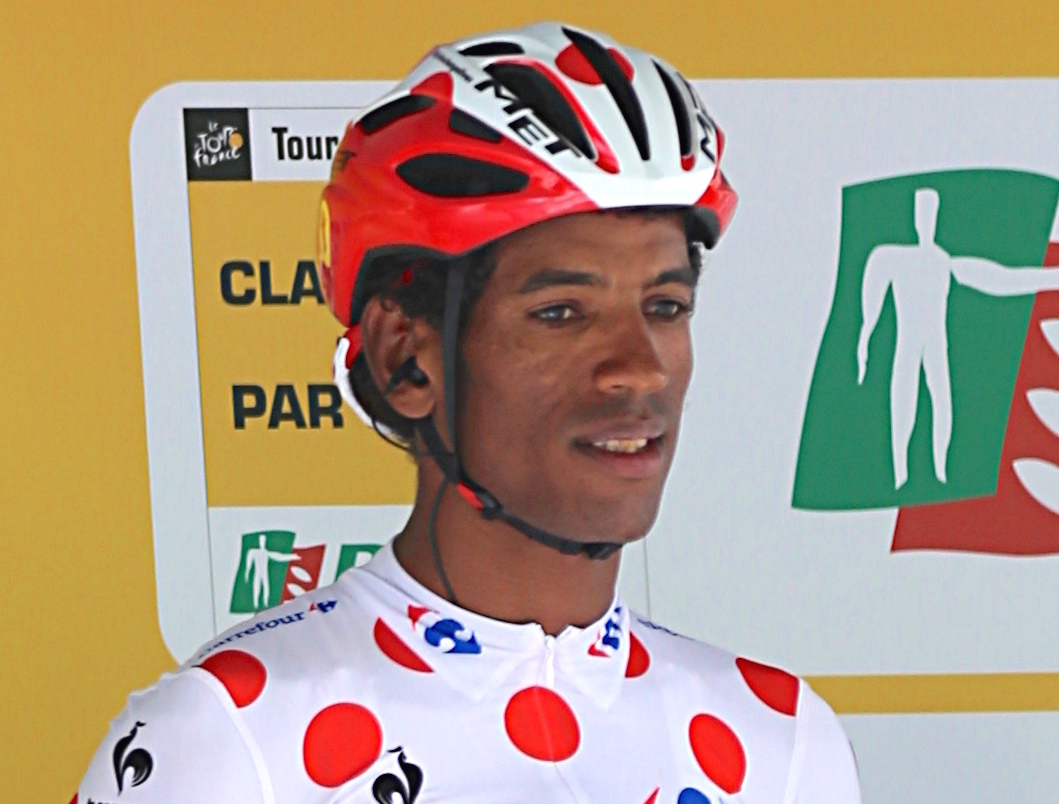
- Teklehaimanot at the 2015 Tour de France

Personal information
- Full name: Daniel Teklehaimanot Girmazion
- Born: 10 November 1988 (age 37) Geza Lamza, Ethiopia
- Height: 1.88 m (6 ft 2 in)
- Weight: 71 kg (157 lb)

Cycling career
- Sport: Cycling
- Discipline: Road
- Role: Rider
- Rider type: Breakaway specialist

Amateur team
- 2009–2011: World Cycling Centre

Professional teams
- 2008: Amore & Vita–McDonald's (stagiaire)
- 2010: Cervélo TestTeam (stagiaire)
- 2012–2013: GreenEDGE
- 2014–2017: MTN–Qhubeka
- 2018: Cofidis

Major wins
- One-day races and Classics National Road Race Championships (2008, 2012, 2016) National Time Trial Championships (2011–2012, 2015–2016, 2018)
Medal record
Men's road cycling
Representing Eritrea
CAC Road African Championships
| Gold medal – first place | 2010 Kigali | Road race |
| Gold medal – first place | 2010 Kigali | Individual time trial |
| Gold medal – first place | 2010 Kigali | Team time trial |
| Gold medal – first place | 2011 Asmara | Individual time trial |
| Gold medal – first place | 2011 Asmara | Team time trial |
| Gold medal – first place | 2012 Ouagadougou | Individual time trial |
| Gold medal – first place | 2012 Ouagadougou | Team time trial |
| Gold medal – first place | 2013 Sharm el-Sheikh | Individual time trial |
| Gold medal – first place | 2013 Sharm el-Sheikh | Team time trial |
| Gold medal – first place | 2015 Wartburg | Team time trial |
| Silver medal – second place | 2015 Wartburg | Individual time trial |

Daniel Teklehaimanot Girmazion (Tigrinya: ዳንኤል ተክለሃይማኖት ግርማጽዮን, Tigrinya pronunciation: [tɐklɐhaymanot]; born 10 November 1988) is a professional road racing cyclist, who last rode for UCI Professional Continental team Cofidis.

== Career ==
Daniel was a member of the UCI's World Cycling Centre training program before signing for the new Australian cycling team GreenEDGE in 2012. Whilst at the World Cycling Centre he was diagnosed with tachycardia, which was corrected by surgery in early 2009. He returned to riding in May of that year and went on to finish sixth overall in that year's Tour de l'Avenir. In 2010 he rode as a trainee for Cervélo TestTeam. The same year, he won the African Championships in the road race, individual time trial and team time trial, at both senior and under-23 levels. On the 2010–11 UCI Africa Tour, he won the Tour du Rwanda and the Kwita Izina Cycling Tour.

He participated in the 2012 Summer Olympics being the first Eritrean competing in a sport other than athletics; he finished the road race in the 73rd position. In 2012, he became the first Eritrean to ride in the Vuelta a España, one of the 3 grand tours; he finished the race 146th overall.

=== MTN–Qhubeka (2014–17) ===
Daniel joined MTN–Qhubeka for the 2014 season, on a two-year contract. In 2015, at the Critérium du Dauphiné, he won the first World Tour jersey in MTN–Qhubeka's history by taking the mountains competition. He was named in the start list for the 2015 Tour de France. In July of the year, Daniel also became the first rider from an African team to wear the polka dot jersey at the Tour de France. In 2016, he again won the mountains classification at the Critérium du Dauphiné.

He was named in the start list for the 2017 Giro d'Italia where he briefly held the Mountains Classification jersey. His final race with Dimension Data was the 2017 Tour of Guangxi.

== Major results ==
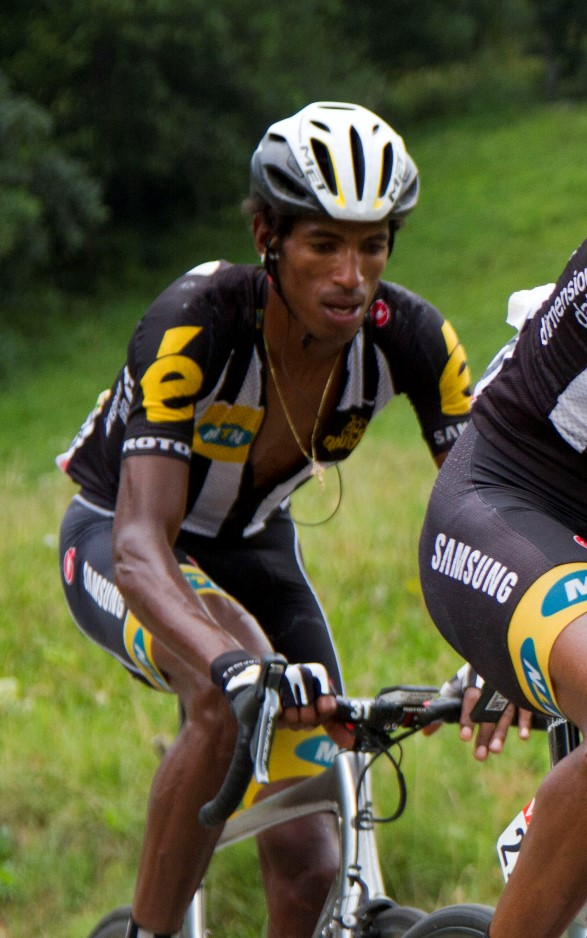
Teklehaimanot at the 2015 Tour de France

2007
8th Road race, All-Africa Games
9th Road race, African Road Championships
2008 (1 pro win)
1st Road race, National Road Championships
African Road Championships

5th Time trial
8th Road race

5th Overall Tour Ivoirien de la Paix
2009
2nd Overall Tour of Eritrea

1st Stages 1 & 3

6th Overall Tour de l'Avenir
2010 (2)
African Road Championships

1st Road race
1st Time trial
1st Team time trial

1st Overall Tour du Rwanda

1st Stage 2

1st Stage 2 Coupe des nations Ville Saguenay
2011 (3)
African Road Championships

1st Time trial
1st Team time trial

National Road Championships

1st Time trial
2nd Road race

1st Overall Kwita Izina Cycling Tour

1st Stages 1, 2 & 3

1st Stage 5 Tour d'Algérie
5th Overall La Tropicale Amissa Bongo

1st Stage 4

2012 (3)
African Road Championships

1st Time trial
1st Team time trial

National Road Championships

1st Road race
1st Time trial

2013 (2)
African Road Championships

1st Time trial
1st Team time trial

1st Prueba Villafranca de Ordizia
2014
4th Overall Mzansi Tour
2015 (1)
African Road Championships

1st Team time trial
2nd Time trial

1st Time trial, National Road Championships
1st Mountains classification, Critérium du Dauphiné
Tour de France

Held after Stages 6–9

2016 (2)
National Road Championships

1st Road race
1st Time trial

1st Mountains classification, Critérium du Dauphiné
3rd Time trial, African Road Championships
2017
3rd Time trial, National Road Championships
7th Overall Tour of Austria
Giro d'Italia

Held after Stages 2–3

2018 (1)
1st Time trial, National Road Championships
2019
9th Overall La Tropicale Amissa Bongo

=== Grand Tour general classification results timeline ===
| Grand Tour | 2012 | 2013 | 2014 | 2015 | 2016 | 2017 |
|---|---|---|---|---|---|---|
| Giro d'Italia | — | — | — | — | — | 111 |
| Tour de France | — | — | — | 49 | 85 | — |
| Vuelta a España | 146 | — | 47 | — | — | — |

Legend
| — | Did not compete |
| DNF | Did not finish |
