= Natnael Berhane =

Eritrean professional cyclist

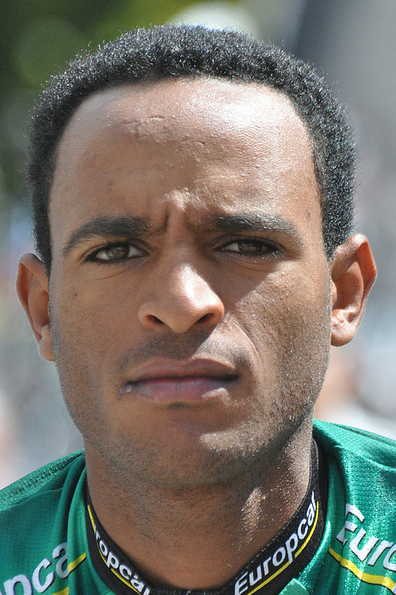
- Natnael at the 2013 Tour de l'Ain

Personal information
- Full name: Natnael Teweldemedhin Berhane
- Born: 5 January 1991 (age 35) Asmara, Ethiopia
- Height: 1.82 m (6 ft 0 in)
- Weight: 66 kg (146 lb)

Cycling career
- Sport: Cycling
- Current team: Istanbul Büyükșehir Belediye Spor Türkiye
- Discipline: Road
- Role: Rider
- Rider type: Puncheur

Amateur teams
- 2010–2012: Eritrea National Team
- 2022: AlShafar Jumeirah

Professional teams
- 2013–2014: Team Europcar
- 2015–2018: MTN–Qhubeka
- 2019–2021: Cofidis
- 2023–: Beykoz Belediyesi Spor Kulübü

Major wins
- Stage races Tour of Turkey (2013) One-Day Races and Classics National Time Trial Championships (2014) National Road Race Championships (2015, 2019)
Medal record
Men's road cycling
Representing Eritrea
African Games
Silver medal – second place	2019 Casablanca	Team time trial
African Road Championships
Gold medal – first place	2011 Asmara	Road race
Gold medal – first place	2011 Asmara	Team time trial
Gold medal – first place	2012 Ouagadougou	Road race
Gold medal – first place	2012 Ouagadougou	Team time trial
Gold medal – first place	2013 Sharm el-Sheikh	Team time trial
Gold medal – first place	2015 Wartburg	Team time trial

Natnael Teweldemedhin Berhane (Tigrinya: ናትናኤል ተወልደመድህን ብርሃነ; born 5 January 1991) is an Eritrean professional road bicycle racer, who rides for UCI Continental team Istanbul Büyükșehir Belediye Spor Türkiye. He is a two-time winner of the road race at the African Road Championships, in 2011 and 2012.

== Career ==
In 2013, Asmara-born Natnael joined Team Europcar. Natnael won the queen stage of the 2013 Tour of Turkey by powering away from the small lead group in the last 200 meters of a long, steep climb. With the provisional suspension of Mustafa Sayar for an earlier EPO positive in the Tour of Algeria, the first place on the General Classification was awarded to Natnael. In early 2014 Turkish Cycling Federation stripped Sayar of his victory and announced Natnael's victory. At the beginning of the season, Natnael won La Tropicale Amissa Bongo, thanks to the bonus seconds awarded during the intermediate sprints on the last stage. He was the first African winner of this race.

After two years with Europcar for his professional debut, Natnael joined African Pro-Continental cycling team MTN–Qhubeka for the 2015 cycling season. He was named in the start list for the 2016 Tour de France and the start list for the 2017 Giro d'Italia.

== Major results ==
2009
7th Overall Tour of Eritrea
2010
1st Overall Tour of Eritrea

1st Stage 1

2nd Overall Tour du Rwanda

1st Stage 7

9th Road race, African Road Championships
2011 (2 pro wins)
African Road Championships

1st Road race
1st Team time trial

1st Stage 6 La Tropicale Amissa Bongo
3rd Overall Tour d'Algérie

1st Stage 1

8th Circuit d'Alger
2012 (1)
African Road Championships

1st Road race
1st Team time trial
7th Time trial

1st Overall Tour d'Algérie

1st Young rider classification
1st Stage 3

2013 (2)
1st Team time trial, African Road Championships
1st Overall Tour of Turkey

1st Stage 3

2014 (2)
1st Time trial, National Road Championships
1st Overall La Tropicale Amissa Bongo

1st Sprints classification

5th Tour du Finistère
2015 (1)
African Road Championships

1st Team time trial
6th Road race

National Road Championships

1st Road race
3rd Time trial

5th Overall Tour of Austria
7th Overall Tour of Utah
2017
2nd Time trial, National Road Championships
2018
10th Overall Tour of Guangxi
2019 (1)
1st Road race, National Road Championships
African Games

2nd Team time trial
4th Road race
4th Time trial

Combativity award Stage 10 Tour de France
2023
1st Stage 3 Tour de Maurice
2nd Grand Prix Kültepe
3rd Classique de l'île Maurice
4th Overall La Tropicale Amissa Bongo
8th Overall Tour of Sakarya
2024
2nd Grand Prix Antalya Airport City
3rd Overall Tour du Maroc
4th Tour of Alanya

=== Grand Tour general classification results timeline ===
Grand Tour	2014	2015	2016	2017	2018	2019	2020	2021
Giro d'Italia	—	—	—	59	83	—	—	DNF
Tour de France	—	—	125	—	—	86	—	—
Vuelta a España	148	79	—	—	—	—	DNF	—

Legend
—	Did not compete
DNF	Did not finish
