= 2016 in men's road cycling =

2016 in men's road cycling is about the 2016 men's bicycle races governed by the UCI.

== UCI World Ranking ==
In 2016, the UCI launched a new ranking system for men's road racing.

=== Year-end ranking ===
UCI World Rankings (Individual), as of 23 October 2016
Rank	Rider	Team	Points
1	Peter Sagan (SVK)	Tinkoff	5359
2	Chris Froome (GBR)	Team Sky	3771
3	Greg Van Avermaet (BEL)	BMC Racing Team	3711.25
4	Nairo Quintana (COL)	Movistar Team	3568.25
5	Alejandro Valverde (ESP)	Movistar Team	2916
6	Romain Bardet (FRA)	AG2R La Mondiale	2552
7	Alexander Kristoff (NOR)	Team Katusha	2426
8	Alberto Contador (ESP)	Tinkoff	2419
9	Diego Ulissi (ITA)	Lampre–Merida	2415
10	Esteban Chaves (COL)	Orica–BikeExchange	2169

UCI World Rankings (Nations), as of 23 October 2016
Rank	Nation	Points
1	France	13007
2	Belgium	12483.25
3	Italy	11922
4	Colombia	11875.5
5	Spain	11330.25
6	Great Britain	10309
7	Netherlands	8455
8	Australia	7719.25
9	Slovakia	5990.5
10	Norway	5779

== World Championships ==
The World Road Championships is set to be held in Doha, Qatar, from 9 to 16 October 2016.

Events at the 2016 UCI Road World Championships
Race	Date	Winner	Second	Third	Ref
World Championship Team Time Trial	October 9	(Belgium) Etixx–Quick-Step	(United States) BMC Racing Team	(Australia) Orica–BikeExchange	
World Championship Time Trial	October 12	Tony Martin (GER)	Vasil Kiryienka (BLR)	Jonathan Castroviejo (ESP)	
World Championship Road Race	October 16	Peter Sagan (SVK)	Mark Cavendish (GBR)	Tom Boonen (BEL)	

== Olympic Games ==
Road cycling events at the 2016 Summer Olympics
Race	Date	Winner	Second	Third	Ref
(International Olympic Committee) Men's road race	August 6	Greg Van Avermaet (BEL)	Jakob Fuglsang (DEN)	Rafał Majka (POL)	
(International Olympic Committee) Men's time trial	August 10	Fabian Cancellara (SUI)	Tom Dumoulin (NED)	Chris Froome (GBR)	

== Grand Tours ==
Grand Tours in the 2016 season
Race	Date	Winner	Second	Third	Ref
(Italy) Giro d'Italia	May 6–29	Vincenzo Nibali (ITA)	Esteban Chaves (COL)	Alejandro Valverde (ESP)	
Tour de France	July 2–24	Chris Froome (GBR)	Romain Bardet (FRA)	Nairo Quintana (COL)	
(Spain) Vuelta a España	August 20 – September 11	Nairo Quintana (COL)	Chris Froome (GBR)	Esteban Chaves (COL)	

== UCI tours ==
Tour	Individual champion	Team champion	Nations champion
World Tour	Peter Sagan (SVK) (Tinkoff)	Movistar Team	Spain
UCI Africa Tour	Issak Tesfom Okubamariam (ERI) (Sharjah Team)	Al Nasr Pro Cycling Team–Dubai	Eritrea
UCI America Tour	Greg Van Avermaet (BEL) (BMC Racing Team)	Holowesko Citadel Racing Team	Colombia
UCI Asia Tour	Mark Cavendish (GBR) (Team Dimension Data)	Pishgaman–Giant	Iran
UCI Europe Tour	Baptiste Planckaert (BEL) (Wallonie-Bruxelles–Group Protect)	Wanty–Groupe Gobert	Belgium
UCI Oceania Tour	Sean Lake (AUS) (Avanti IsoWhey Sports)	Avanti IsoWhey Sports	Australia

== UCI World Tour ==
Race	Date	Winner	Second	Third	Ref
(Australia) Tour Down Under	19–24 January	Simon Gerrans (AUS)	Richie Porte (AUS)	Sergio Henao (COL)	
(France) Paris–Nice	6–13 March	Geraint Thomas (GBR)	Alberto Contador (ESP)	Richie Porte (AUS)	
(Italy) Tirreno–Adriatico	9–15 March	Greg Van Avermaet (BEL)	Peter Sagan (SVK)	Bob Jungels (LUX)	
(Italy) Milan–San Remo	19 March	Arnaud Démare (FRA)	Ben Swift (GBR)	Jürgen Roelandts (BEL)	
(Spain) Volta a Catalunya	21–27 March	Nairo Quintana (COL)	Alberto Contador (ESP)	Dan Martin (IRL)	
(Belgium) E3 Harelbeke	25 March	Michał Kwiatkowski (POL)	Peter Sagan (SVK)	Ian Stannard (GBR)	
(Belgium) Gent–Wevelgem	27 March	Peter Sagan (SVK)	Sep Vanmarcke (BEL)	Vyacheslav Kuznetsov (RUS)	
(Belgium) Tour of Flanders	3 April	Peter Sagan (SVK)	Fabian Cancellara (SUI)	Sep Vanmarcke (BEL)	
(Spain) Tour of the Basque Country	4–9 April	Alberto Contador (ESP)	Sergio Henao (COL)	Nairo Quintana (COL)	
(France) Paris–Roubaix	10 April	Mathew Hayman (AUS)	Tom Boonen (BEL)	Ian Stannard (GBR)	
(Netherlands) Amstel Gold Race	17 April	Enrico Gasparotto (ITA)	Michael Valgren (DEN)	Sonny Colbrelli (ITA)	
(Belgium) La Flèche Wallonne	20 April	Alejandro Valverde (ESP)	Julian Alaphilippe (FRA)	Dan Martin (IRL)	
(Belgium) Liège–Bastogne–Liège	24 April	Wout Poels (NED)	Michael Albasini (SUI)	Rui Costa (POR)	
(Switzerland) Tour de Romandie	26 April – 1 May	Nairo Quintana (COL)	Thibaut Pinot (FRA)	Jon Izagirre (ESP)	
(France) Critérium du Dauphiné	5–12 June	Chris Froome (GBR)	Romain Bardet (FRA)	Dan Martin (IRL)	
(Switzerland) Tour de Suisse	11–19 June	Miguel Ángel López (COL)	Jon Izagirre (ESP)	Warren Barguil (FRA)	
(Poland) Tour de Pologne	12–18 July	Tim Wellens (BEL)	Fabio Felline (ITA)	Alberto Bettiol (ITA)	
(Spain) Clásica de San Sebastián	30 July	Bauke Mollema (NED)	Tony Gallopin (FRA)	Alejandro Valverde (ESP)	
(Germany) Hamburg Cyclassics	21 August	Caleb Ewan (AUS)	John Degenkolb (GER)	Giacomo Nizzolo (ITA)	
GP Ouest-France	28 August	Oliver Naesen (BEL)	Alberto Bettiol (ITA)	Alexander Kristoff (NOR)	
(Canada) GP de Québec	9 September	Peter Sagan (SVK)	Greg Van Avermaet (BEL)	Anthony Roux (FRA)	
(Canada) GP de Montréal	11 September	Greg Van Avermaet (BEL)	Peter Sagan (SVK)	Diego Ulissi (ITA)	
(Belgium) / (Netherlands) Eneco Tour	19–25 September	Niki Terpstra (NED)	Oliver Naesen (BEL)	Peter Sagan (SVK)	
(Italy) Il Lombardia	1 October	Esteban Chaves (COL)	Diego Rosa (ITA)	Rigoberto Urán (COL)	

== 2.HC Category ==
Race	Date	Winner	Second	Third	Ref
(United Arab Emirates) Dubai Tour	February 3–6	Marcel Kittel (GER)	Giacomo Nizzolo (ITA)	Juan José Lobato (ESP)	
Tour of Qatar	February 8–12	Mark Cavendish (GBR)	Alexander Kristoff (NOR)	Greg Van Avermaet (BEL)	
Tour of Oman	February 16–21	Vincenzo Nibali (ITA)	Romain Bardet (FRA)	Jakob Fuglsang (DEN)	
(Malaysia) Tour de Langkawi	February 24 – March 2	Reinardt Janse van Rensburg (RSA)	Daniel Jaramillo (COL)	Miguel Ángel López (COL)	
(France) Critérium International	March 26–27	Thibaut Pinot (FRA)	Pierre Latour (FRA)	Sam Oomen (NED)	
(Belgium) Three Days of De Panne	March 29–31	Lieuwe Westra (NED)	Alexander Kristoff (NOR)	Alexey Lutsenko (KAZ)	
(Italy) Giro del Trentino	April 19–22	Mikel Landa (ESP)	Tanel Kangert (EST)	Jakob Fuglsang (DEN)	
Presidential Tour of Turkey	April 24 – May 1	José Gonçalves (POR)	David Arroyo (ESP)	Nikita Stalnov (KAZ)	
(France) Four Days of Dunkirk	May 4–8	Bryan Coquard (FRA)	Marco Frapporti (ITA)	Xandro Meurisse (BEL)	
(United States) Tour of California	May 15–22	Julian Alaphilippe (FRA)	Rohan Dennis (AUS)	Brent Bookwalter (USA)	
Tour of Norway	May 18–22	Pieter Weening (NED)	Edvald Boasson Hagen (NOR)	Sondre Holst Enger (NOR)	
Tour of Belgium	May 25–29	Dries Devenyns (BEL)	Reto Hollenstein (SUI)	Stijn Vandenbergh (BEL)	
Tour de Luxembourg	June 1–5	Maurits Lammertink (NED)	Philippe Gilbert (BEL)	Alex Kirsch (LUX)	
(China) Tour of Qinghai Lake	July 17–30	Sergiy Lagkuti (UKR)	Matej Mugerli (SLO)	Vitaliy Buts (UKR)	
(Belgium) Tour de Wallonie	July 23–27	Dries Devenyns (BEL)	Gianni Meersman (BEL)	Vyacheslav Kuznetsov (RUS)	
(Denmark) Danmark Rundt	July 27–31	Michael Valgren (DEN)	Magnus Cort (DEN)	Mads Würtz Schmidt (DEN)	
(United States) Tour of Utah	August 1–7	Lachlan Morton (AUS)	Adrien Costa (USA)	Andrew Talansky (USA)	
(Spain) Vuelta a Burgos	August 2–6	Alberto Contador (ESP)	Ben Hermans (BEL)	Sergio Pardilla (ESP)	
Arctic Race of Norway	August 10–14	Gianni Moscon (ITA)	Stef Clement (NED)	Oscar Gatto (ITA)	
(United Kingdom) Tour of Britain	September 4–11	Stephen Cummings (GBR)	Rohan Dennis (AUS)	Tom Dumoulin (NED)	
(United Arab Emirates) Abu Dhabi Tour	October 20–23	Tanel Kangert (EST)	Nicolas Roche (IRL)	Diego Ulissi (ITA)	
(China) Tour of Hainan	October 22–30	Alexey Lutsenko (KAZ)	Przemysław Niemiec (POL)	Matej Mohorič (SLO)	

== 1.HC Category Races ==
Race	Date	Winner	Second	Third	Ref
(Australia) Cadel Evans Great Ocean Road Race	January 31	Peter Kennaugh (GBR)	Leigh Howard (AUS)	Niccolò Bonifazio (ITA)	
(Italy) Trofeo Laigueglia	February 14	Andrea Fedi (ITA)	Sonny Colbrelli (ITA)	Grega Bole (SLO)	
(Belgium) Omloop Het Nieuwsblad	February 27	Greg Van Avermaet (BEL)	Peter Sagan (SVK)	Tiesj Benoot (BEL)	
(Belgium) Kuurne–Brussels–Kuurne	February 28	Jasper Stuyven (BEL)	Alexander Kristoff (NOR)	Nacer Bouhanni (FRA)	
(Switzerland) Gran Premio di Lugano	February 28	Sonny Colbrelli (ITA)	Diego Ulissi (ITA)	Roberto Ferrari (ITA)	
(Italy) Strade Bianche	March 5	Fabian Cancellara (SUI)	Zdeněk Štybar (CZE)	Gianluca Brambilla (ITA)	
(Belgium) Nokere Koerse	March 16	Timothy Dupont (BEL)	Kristoffer Halvorsen (NOR)	Dylan Groenewegen (NED)	
(Belgium) Dwars door Vlaanderen	March 23	Jens Debusschere (BEL)	Bryan Coquard (FRA)	Edward Theuns (BEL)	
(Belgium) Scheldeprijs	April 6	Marcel Kittel (GER)	Mark Cavendish (GBR)	André Greipel (GER)	
(Belgium) Brabantse Pijl	April 13	Petr Vakoč (CZE)	Enrico Gasparotto (ITA)	Tony Gallopin (FRA)	
(France) Grand Prix de Denain	April 14	Daniel McLay (GBR)	Thomas Boudat (FRA)	Kenny Dehaes (BEL)	
(Germany) Eschborn–Frankfurt City Loop	May 1	Alexander Kristoff (NOR)	Maximiliano Richeze (ARG)	Sam Bennett (IRL)	
(Switzerland) Grosser Preis des Kantons Aargau	June 9	Giacomo Nizzolo (ITA)	Andrea Pasqualon (ITA)	David Tanner (AUS)	
(United Kingdom) London–Surrey Classic	July 31	Tom Boonen (BEL)	Mark Renshaw (AUS)	Michael Matthews (AUS)	
(Belgium) Brussels Cycling Classic	September 3	Tom Boonen (BEL)	Arnaud Démare (FRA)	Nacer Bouhanni (FRA)	
(France) Grand Prix de Fourmies	September 4	Marcel Kittel (GER)	Nacer Bouhanni (FRA)	Bryan Coquard (FRA)	
(Belgium) GP Impanis–Van Petegem	September 17	Fernando Gaviria (COL)	Timothy Dupont (BEL)	Maximiliano Richeze (ARG)	
(Italy) Giro dell'Emilia	September 24	Esteban Chaves (COL)	Romain Bardet (FRA)	Rigoberto Urán (COL)	
(Italy) Gran Premio Bruno Beghelli	September 25	Nicola Ruffoni (ITA)	Filippo Pozzato (ITA)	Jens Keukeleire (BEL)	
(Italy) Tre Valli Varesine	September 27	Sonny Colbrelli (ITA)	Diego Ulissi (ITA)	Francesco Gavazzi (ITA)	
(Italy) Milano–Torino	September 28	Miguel Ángel López (COL)	Michael Woods (CAN)	Rigoberto Urán (COL)	
(Italy) Giro del Piemonte	September 29	Giacomo Nizzolo (ITA)	Fernando Gaviria (COL)	Daniele Bennati (ITA)	
(Germany) Münsterland Giro	October 3	John Degenkolb (GER)	Roy Jans (BEL)	Pascal Ackermann (GER)	
(France) Paris–Tours	October 9	Fernando Gaviria (COL)	Arnaud Démare (FRA)	Jonas Vangenechten (BEL)	
Japan Cup	October 23	Davide Villella (ITA)	Christopher Juul-Jensen (DEN)	Robert Power (AUS)	

== Championships ==
=== Continental Championships ===
Championships	Race	Date	Winner	Second	Third	Ref
African Championships; Morocco	Road race	February 26	Issak Tesfom Okubamariam (ERI)	Youcef Reguigui (ALG)	Mekseb Debesay (ERI)	
African Championships; Morocco	Individual time trial	February 24	Mouhssine Lahsaini (MAR)	Tsgabu Grmay (ETH)	Daniel Teklehaimanot (ERI)	
African Championships; Morocco	Team time trial	February 22	Eritrea	Algeria	Morocco	
Pan American Championships; Venezuela	Road race	May 22	Jonathan Caicedo (ECU)	Brayan Ramírez (COL)	Jonathan Monsalve (VEN)	
Pan American Championships; Venezuela	Individual time trial	May 19	Walter Vargas (COL)	Laureano Rosas (ARG)	Cristian Serrano (COL)	
Asian Championships; Japan	Road race	January 24	Cheung King Lok (HKG)	Yukiya Arashiro (JPN)	Fumiyuki Beppu (JPN)	
Asian Championships; Japan	Individual time trial	January 21	Cheung King Lok (HKG)	Choe Hyeong-min (KOR)	Alireza Haghi (IRI)	
European Championships; France	Road race	September 18	Peter Sagan (SVK)	Julian Alaphilippe (FRA)	Daniel Moreno (ESP)	
European Championships; France	Individual time trial	September 15	Jonathan Castroviejo (ESP)	Victor Campenaerts (BEL)	Moreno Moser (ITA)	
Oceanian Championships; Australia	Road race	March 5	Sean Lake (AUS)	Brendan Canty (AUS)	Mark O'Brien (AUS)	
Oceanian Championships; Australia	Individual time trial	March 3	Sean Lake (AUS)	Joseph Cooper (NZL)	Benjamin Dyball (AUS)	

== UCI Teams ==
=== UCI WorldTeams ===
2016 UCI WorldTeams
Code	Official team name	Licence holder	Country	Groupset	Bicycles
ALM	AG2R La Mondiale (2016 season)	EUSRL France Cyclisme	France	SRAM	Focus
AST	Astana (2016 season)	Abacanto SA	Kazakhstan	Campagnolo	Specialized
BMC	BMC Racing Team (2016 season)	Continuum Sports LLC	United States	Shimano	BMC
CPT	Cannondale–Drapac (2016 season)	Slipstream Sports, LLC	United States	Shimano	Cannondale
DDD	Team Dimension Data (2016 season)		South Africa	Shimano	Cervélo
EQS	Etixx–Quick-Step (2016 season)	Esperanza bvba	Belgium	Shimano	Specialized
FDJ	FDJ (2016 season)	Société de Gestion de L'Echappée	France	Shimano	Lapierre
IAM	IAM Cycling (2016 season)		Switzerland	Shimano	Scott
LAM	Lampre–Merida (2016 season)	CGS Cycling Team AG	Italy	Shimano	Merida
LTS	Lotto–Soudal (2016 season)	Belgian Cycling Company sa	Belgium	Campagnolo	Ridley
MOV	Movistar Team (2016 season)	Abarca Sports S.L.	Spain	Campagnolo	Canyon
OGE	Orica–BikeExchange (2016 season)	GreenEdge Cycling	Australia	Shimano	Scott
TGA	Team Giant–Alpecin (2016 season)	SMS Cycling B.V.	Germany	Shimano	Giant
KAT	Team Katusha (2016 season)	Katusha Management SA	Russia	SRAM	Canyon
TLJ	LottoNL–Jumbo (2016 season)	Rabo Wielerploegen	Netherlands	Shimano	Bianchi
SKY	Team Sky (2016 season)	Tour Racing Limited	Great Britain	Shimano	Pinarello
TNK	Tinkoff (2016 season)	Tinkoff Sport	Russia	Shimano	Specialized
TFR	Trek–Segafredo (2016 season)	Trek Bicycle Corporation	United States	Shimano	Trek
