= 2016 Etixx–Quick-Step season =

Etixx–Quick-Step
- 2016 season
- UCI code: EQS
- Status: UCI ProTeam
- Manager: Patrick Lefevere
- Main sponsor(s): Etixx & Quick Step
- Based: Belgium
- Bicycles: Specialized
- Groupset: Shimano

Season victories
- One-day races: 12
- Stage race overall: 3
- Stage race stages: 36
- World Championships: 1
- National Championships: 3

The 2016 season for Etixx–Quick-Step began in January at the Tour de San Luis. As a UCI WorldTeam, they were automatically invited and obliged to send a squad to every event in the UCI World Tour.

== Team roster ==
As of 30 July 2016

| Rider | Date of birth |
|---|---|
| Julian Alaphilippe (FRA) | 11 June 1992 (aged 23) |
| Tom Boonen (BEL) | 15 October 1980 (aged 35) |
| Maxime Bouet (FRA) | 3 November 1986 (aged 29) |
| Gianluca Brambilla (ITA) | 22 August 1987 (aged 28) |
| Rodrigo Contreras (COL) | 2 June 1994 (aged 21) |
| Adrien Costa (Note: Costa joined the team on 1 August as a stagiaire, from Axeon–Hagens Berman.) (USA) | 19 August 1997 (aged 18) |
| Laurens De Plus (BEL) | 4 September 1995 (aged 20) |
| David de la Cruz (ESP) | 6 May 1989 (aged 26) |
| Iván García (Note: García joined the team on 1 August as a stagiaire, from Klein Constantia.) (ESP) | 20 November 1995 (aged 20) |
| Fernando Gaviria (COL) | 19 August 1994 (aged 21) |
| Bob Jungels (LUX) | 22 September 1992 (aged 23) |
| Iljo Keisse (BEL) | 21 December 1982 (aged 33) |
| Marcel Kittel (GER) | 11 May 1988 (aged 27) |
| Yves Lampaert (BEL) | 10 April 1991 (aged 24) |
| Nikolas Maes (BEL) | 9 April 1986 (aged 29) |
| Dan Martin (IRL) | 20 August 1986 (aged 29) |
| Tony Martin (GER) | 23 April 1985 (aged 30) |

| Rider | Date of birth |
|---|---|
| Davide Martinelli (ITA) | 31 May 1993 (aged 22) |
| Gianni Meersman (BEL) | 5 December 1985 (aged 30) |
| Maximiliano Richeze (ARG) | 7 March 1983 (aged 33) |
| Fabio Sabatini (ITA) | 10 February 1985 (aged 31) |
| Hamish Schreurs (Note: Schreurs joined the team on 27 July as a stagiaire, from Klein Constantia.) (NZL) | 23 January 1994 (aged 22) |
| Pieter Serry (BEL) | 21 November 1988 (aged 27) |
| Zdeněk Štybar (CZE) | 11 December 1985 (aged 30) |
| Niki Terpstra (NED) | 18 May 1984 (aged 31) |
| Matteo Trentin (ITA) | 2 August 1989 (aged 26) |
| Petr Vakoč (CZE) | 11 July 1992 (aged 23) |
| Guillaume Van Keirsbulck (BEL) | 14 February 1991 (aged 25) |
| Stijn Vandenbergh (BEL) | 25 April 1984 (aged 31) |
| Martin Velits (SVK) | 21 February 1985 (aged 31) |
| Julien Vermote (BEL) | 26 July 1989 (aged 26) |
| Carlos Verona (Note: Verona left the team on 30 July, to join Orica–BikeExchange.) (ESP) | 4 November 1992 (aged 23) |
| Łukasz Wiśniowski (POL) | 7 December 1991 (aged 24) |

Riders who joined the team for the 2016 season

| Rider | 2015 team |
|---|---|
| Rodrigo Contreras | neo-pro (Coldeportes-Claro) |
| Laurens De Plus | neo-pro (Lotto–Soudal U23) |
| Fernando Gaviria | neo-pro (Coldeportes-Claro) |
| Bob Jungels | Trek Factory Racing |
| Marcel Kittel | Team Giant–Alpecin |
| Dan Martin | Cannondale–Garmin |
| Davide Martinelli | neo-pro (Team Colpack) |
| Maximiliano Richeze | Lampre–Merida |

Riders who left the team during or after the 2015 season

| Rider | 2016 team |
|---|---|
| Mark Cavendish | Team Dimension Data |
| Michał Gołaś | Team Sky |
| Michał Kwiatkowski | Team Sky |
| Mark Renshaw | Team Dimension Data |
| Rigoberto Urán | Cannondale |

== Season victories ==
| Date | Race | Competition | Rider | Country | Location |
|---|---|---|---|---|---|
| 18 January | Tour de San Luis, Stage 1 | UCI America Tour | Team time trial (Note: The riders on the squad were Fernando Gaviria, Maximiliano Richeze, Łukasz Wiśniowski, Fabio Sabatini, Stijn Vandenbergh and Rodrigo Contreras.) | Argentina | San Luis |
| 19 January | Tour de San Luis, Stage 2 | UCI America Tour | Fernando Gaviria (COL) | Argentina | Villa Mercedes |
| 29 January | Trofeo Pollenca-Port de Andratx | UCI Europe Tour | Gianluca Brambilla (ITA) | Spain | Mallorca |
| 3 February | Dubai Tour, Stage 1 | UCI Asia Tour | Marcel Kittel (GER) | United Arab Emirates | Fujairah |
| 4 February | Volta a la Comunitat Valenciana, Stage 2 | UCI Europe Tour | Dan Martin (IRL) | Spain | Fredes |
| 6 February | Dubai Tour, Stage 4 | UCI Asia Tour | Marcel Kittel (GER) | United Arab Emirates | Burj Khalifa |
| 6 February | Dubai Tour, Overall | UCI Asia Tour | Marcel Kittel (GER) | United Arab Emirates | |
| 6 February | Dubai Tour, Points classification | UCI Asia Tour | Marcel Kittel (GER) | United Arab Emirates | |
| 7 February | Volta a la Comunitat Valenciana, Stage 5 | UCI Europe Tour | Stijn Vandenbergh (BEL) | Spain | Valencia |
| 16 February | Tour of Oman, Stage 1 | UCI Asia Tour | Bob Jungels (LUX) | Oman | Al-Bustan |
| 17 February | Volta ao Algarve, Stage 1 | UCI Europe Tour | Marcel Kittel (GER) | Portugal | Albufeira |
| 20 February | Volta ao Algarve, Stage 4 | UCI Europe Tour | Marcel Kittel (GER) | Portugal | Tavira |
| 21 February | Volta ao Algarve, Points classification | UCI Europe Tour | Marcel Kittel (GER) | Portugal | |
| 21 February | Tour du Haut Var, Young rider classification | UCI Europe Tour | Petr Vakoč (CZE) | France | |
| 24 February | Tour La Provence, Stage 2 | UCI Europe Tour | Davide Martinelli (ITA) | France | Istres |
| 25 February | Tour La Provence, Stage 3 | UCI Europe Tour | Fernando Gaviria (COL) | France | Marseille |
| 25 February | Tour La Provence, Points classification | UCI Europe Tour | Fernando Gaviria (COL) | France | |
| 25 February | Tour La Provence, Young rider classification | UCI Europe Tour | Petr Vakoč (CZE) | France | |
| 25 February | Tour La Provence, Teams classification | UCI Europe Tour | (Note: The riders on the squad were Julian Alaphilippe, Maxime Bouet, Davide Martinelli, Fernando Gaviria, Martin Velits, Pieter Serry, Petr Vakoč and Carlos Verona) | France | |
| 27 February | Classic Sud-Ardèche | UCI Europe Tour | Petr Vakoč (CZE) | France | Guilherand-Granges |
| 28 February | La Drôme Classic | UCI Europe Tour | Petr Vakoč (CZE) | France | Livron |
| 2 March | Le Samyn | UCI Europe Tour | Niki Terpstra (NED) | Belgium | Dour |
| 10 March | Tirreno–Adriatico, Stage 2 | UCI World Tour | Zdeněk Štybar (CZE) | Italy | Pomarance |
| 11 March | Tirreno–Adriatico, Stage 3 | UCI World Tour | Fernando Gaviria (COL) | Italy | Montalto di Castro |
| 15 March | Tirreno–Adriatico, Young rider classification | UCI World Tour | Bob Jungels (LUX) | Italy | |
| 15 March | Tirreno–Adriatico, Teams classification | UCI World Tour | (Note: The riders on the squad were Tony Martin, Gianluca Brambilla, Fernando Gaviria, Bob Jungels, Yves Lampaert, Zdeněk Štybar, Matteo Trentin and Julien Vermote) | Italy | |
| 23 March | Volta a Catalunya, Stage 3 | UCI World Tour | Dan Martin (IRL) | Spain | La Molina |
| 31 March | Three Days of De Panne, Stage 3a | UCI Europe Tour | Marcel Kittel (GER) | Belgium | De Panne |
| 6 April | Scheldeprijs | UCI Europe Tour | Marcel Kittel (GER) | Belgium | Schoten |
| 13 April | Brabantse Pijl | UCI Europe Tour | Petr Vakoč (CZE) | Belgium | Overijse |
| 27 April | Tour de Romandie, Stage 1 | UCI World Tour | Marcel Kittel (GER) | Switzerland | Moudon |
| 7 May | Giro d'Italia, Stage 2 | UCI World Tour | Marcel Kittel (GER) | Netherlands | Nijmegen |
| 8 May | Giro d'Italia, Stage 3 | UCI World Tour | Marcel Kittel (GER) | Netherlands | Arnhem |
| 8 May | Four Days of Dunkirk, Teams classification | UCI Europe Tour | (Note: The riders on the squad were Niki Terpstra, Iljo Keisse, Yves Lampaert, Nikolas Maes, Maximiliano Richeze, Guillaume Van Keirsbulck and Stijn Vandenbergh) | France | |
| 14 May | Giro d'Italia, Stage 8 | UCI World Tour | Gianluca Brambilla (ITA) | Italy | Arezzo |
| 17 May | Tour of California, Stage 3 | UCI America Tour | Julian Alaphilippe (FRA) | United States | Santa Barbara County |
| 22 May | Tour of California, Overall | UCI America Tour | Julian Alaphilippe (FRA) | United States | |
| 26 May | Giro d'Italia, Stage 18 | UCI World Tour | Matteo Trentin (ITA) | Italy | Pinerolo |
| 29 May | Giro d'Italia, Young rider classification | UCI World Tour | Bob Jungels (LUX) | Italy | |
| 12 June | Critérium du Dauphiné, Young rider classification | UCI World Tour | Julian Alaphilippe (FRA) | France | |
| 14 June | Tour de Suisse, Stage 4 | UCI World Tour | Maximiliano Richeze (ARG) | Switzerland | Champagne |
| 19 June | Tour de Suisse, Points classification | UCI World Tour | Maximiliano Richeze (ARG) | Switzerland | |
| 5 July | Tour de France, Stage 4 | UCI World Tour | Marcel Kittel (GER) | France | Limoges |
| 12 July | Tour de Pologne, Stage 1 | UCI World Tour | Davide Martinelli (ITA) | Poland | Warsaw |
| 13 July | Tour de Pologne, Stage 2 | UCI World Tour | Fernando Gaviria (COL) | Poland | Katowice |
| 15 July | Tour de Pologne, Stage 4 | UCI World Tour | Fernando Gaviria (COL) | Poland | Rzeszów |
| 23 July | Tour de Wallonie, Stage 1 | UCI Europe Tour | Tom Boonen (BEL) | Belgium | Mettet |
| 26 July | Tour de Wallonie, Stage 4 | UCI Europe Tour | Matteo Trentin (ITA) | Belgium | Herstal |
| 27 July | Tour de Wallonie, Points classification | UCI Europe Tour | Matteo Trentin (ITA) | Belgium | |
| 31 July | RideLondon–Surrey Classic | UCI Europe Tour | Tom Boonen (BEL) | United Kingdom | London |
| 5 August | Dwars door het Hageland | UCI Europe Tour | Niki Terpstra (NED) | Belgium | Diest |
| 10 August | Tour de l'Ain, Stage 1 | UCI Europe Tour | Matteo Trentin (ITA) | France | Saint-Vulbas |
| 13 August | Tour de l'Ain, Points classification | UCI Europe Tour | Matteo Trentin (ITA) | France | |
| 21 August | Vuelta a España, Stage 2 | UCI World Tour | Gianni Meersman (BEL) | Spain | Baiona |
| 24 August | Vuelta a España, Stage 5 | UCI World Tour | Gianni Meersman (BEL) | Spain | Lugo |
| 28 August | Vuelta a España, Stage 9 | UCI World Tour | David de la Cruz (ESP) | Spain | Alto del Naranco, Oviedo |
| 3 September | Brussels Cycling Classic | UCI Europe Tour | Tom Boonen (BEL) | Belgium | Brussels |
| 4 September | Grand Prix de Fourmies | UCI Europe Tour | Marcel Kittel (GER) | France | Fourmies |
| 4 September | Vuelta a España, Stage 15 | UCI World Tour | Gianluca Brambilla (ITA) | Spain | Aramon Formigal, Sallent de Gállego |
| 5 September | Tour of Britain, Stage 2 | UCI Europe Tour | Julien Vermote (BEL) | United Kingdom | Kendal |
| 10 September | Tour of Britain, Stage 7a | UCI Europe Tour | Tony Martin (GER) | United Kingdom | Bristol |
| 17 September | GP Impanis-Van Petegem | UCI Europe Tour | Fernando Gaviria (COL) | Belgium | Boortmeerbeek |
| 25 September | Eneco Tour, Overall | UCI World Tour | Niki Terpstra (NED) | Belgium; Netherlands | |
| 25 September | Eneco Tour, Teams classification | UCI World Tour | (Note: The riders on the squad were Tom Boonen, Bob Jungels, Marcel Kittel, Tony Martin, Zdeněk Štybar, Niki Terpstra, Matteo Trentin and Iljo Keisse) | Belgium; Netherlands | |
| 9 October | Paris–Tours | UCI Europe Tour | Fernando Gaviria (COL) | France | Tours |
| 9 October | UCI Road World Championships, Team time trial | UCI World Tour | (Note: The riders on the squad were Bob Jungels, Marcel Kittel, Yves Lampaert, Tony Martin, Niki Terpstra, and Julien Vermote) | Qatar | Doha |

== National, Continental and World champions 2016 ==
| Date | Discipline | Jersey | Rider | Country | Location |
|---|---|---|---|---|---|
| 24 June | German National Time Trial Champion | | Tony Martin (GER) | Germany | Streufdorf |
| 24 June | Luxembourg National Time Trial Champion | | Bob Jungels (LUX) | Luxembourg | Berbourg |
| 26 June | Luxembourgish National Road Race Champion | | Bob Jungels (LUX) | Luxembourg | Berbourg |
