= 2016 IAM Cycling season =

IAM Cycling
- 2016 season
- UCI code: IAM
- Status: UCI ProTeam
- Manager: Serge Beucherie
- Main sponsor(s): IAM Independent Asset Management
- Based: Switzerland
- Bicycles: Scott
- Groupset: Shimano

Season victories
- One-day races: 3
- Stage race overall: 3
- Stage race stages: 9
- National Championships: 3

The 2016 season for the IAM Cycling cycling team began in January at the Tour Down Under. As a UCI WorldTeam, they were automatically invited and obligated to send a squad to every event in the UCI World Tour.

The team disbanded at the end of the season.

== Team roster ==
As of 29 March 2016

Rider	Date of birth
Marcel Aregger (SUI)	August 26, 1990 (aged 25)
Matthias Brändle (AUT)	December 7, 1989 (aged 26)
Clément Chevrier (FRA)	June 29, 1992 (aged 23)
Stef Clement (NED)	September 24, 1982 (aged 33)
Jérôme Coppel (FRA)	August 6, 1986 (aged 29)
Stefan Denifl (AUT)	September 20, 1987 (aged 28)
Dries Devenyns (BEL)	July 22, 1983 (aged 32)
Martin Elmiger (SUI)	September 23, 1978 (aged 37)
Sondre Holst Enger (NOR)	December 17, 1993 (aged 22)
Mathias Frank (SUI)	December 9, 1986 (aged 29)
Jonathan Fumeaux (SUI)	March 7, 1988 (aged 28)
Heinrich Haussler (AUS)	February 25, 1984 (aged 32)
Reto Hollenstein (SUI)	August 22, 1985 (aged 30)
Leigh Howard (AUS)	October 18, 1989 (aged 26)

Rider	Date of birth
Roger Kluge (GER)	February 5, 1986 (aged 30)
Vegard Stake Laengen (NOR)	February 7, 1989 (aged 27)
Pirmin Lang (SUI)	November 25, 1984 (aged 31)
Oliver Naesen (BEL)	September 16, 1990 (aged 25)
Jarlinson Pantano (COL)	November 19, 1988 (aged 27)
Simon Pellaud (SUI)	November 6, 1992 (aged 23)
Matteo Pelucchi (ITA)	January 21, 1989 (aged 27)
Vicente Reynés (ESP)	July 30, 1981 (aged 34)
Aleksejs Saramotins (LAT)	April 8, 1982 (aged 33)
David Tanner (AUS)	September 30, 1984 (aged 31)
Jonas van Genechten (BEL)	September 16, 1986 (aged 29)
Larry Warbasse (USA)	June 28, 1990 (aged 25)
Marcel Wyss (SUI)	June 25, 1986 (aged 29)
Oliver Zaugg (SUI)	May 9, 1981 (aged 34)

Riders who joined the team for the 2016 season

Rider	2015 team
Leigh Howard	Orica–GreenEDGE
Vegard Stake Laengen	Team Joker
Oliver Naesen	Topsport Vlaanderen–Baloise
Oliver Zaugg	Tinkoff–Saxo

Riders who left the team during or after the 2015 season

Rider	2016 team
Sylvain Chavanel	Direct Énergie
Thomas Degand	Wanty–Groupe Gobert
Jérôme Pineau	Retired
Sébastien Reichenbach	FDJ
Patrick Schelling	Team Vorarlberg

== Season victories ==
Date	Race	Competition	Rider	Country	Location
31 January	Grand Prix Cycliste la Marseillaise	UCI Europe Tour	Dries Devenyns (BEL)	France	Marseille
7 February	Étoile de Bessèges, Stage 5	UCI Europe Tour	Jérôme Coppel (FRA)	France	Alès
7 February	Étoile de Bessèges, Overall	UCI Europe Tour	Jérôme Coppel (FRA)	France	
14 February	Clásica de Almería	UCI Europe Tour	Leigh Howard (AUS)	Spain	Almeria
24 April	Tour of Croatia, Stage 6	UCI Europe Tour	Sondre Holst Enger (NOR)	Croatia	Zagreb
22 May	Tour of Norway, Points classification	UCI Europe Tour	Sondre Holst Enger (NOR)	Norway	
25 May	Giro d'Italia, Stage 17	UCI World Tour	Roger Kluge (GER)	Italy	Cassano d'Adda
27 May	Tour of Belgium, Stage 2	UCI Europe Tour	Dries Devenyns (BEL)	Belgium	Herzele
29 May	Tour of Belgium, Overall	UCI Europe Tour	Dries Devenyns (BEL)	Belgium	
29 May	Tour of Belgium, Team classification	UCI Europe Tour	(Note: The riders on the squad were Dries Devenyns, Martin Elmiger, Clément Chevrier, Reto Hollenstein, Oliver Naesen, Vicente Reynès, Aleksejs Saramotins and Jonas Vangenechten)	Belgium	
19 June	Tour de Suisse, Stage 9	UCI World Tour	Jarlinson Pantano (COL)	Switzerland	Davos
17 July	Tour de France, Stage 15	UCI World Tour	Jarlinson Pantano (COL)	France	Culoz
27 July	Tour de Wallonie, Stage 5	UCI Europe Tour	Dries Devenyns (BEL)	Belgium	Dison
27 July	Tour de Wallonie, Overall	UCI Europe Tour	Dries Devenyns (BEL)	Belgium	
28 August	GP Ouest-France	UCI World Tour	Oliver Naesen (BEL)	France	Plouay
31 August	Tour des Fjords, Stage 1	UCI Europe Tour	Leigh Howard (AUS)	Norway	Bergen
7 September	Vuelta a España, Stage 17	UCI World Tour	Mathias Frank (SUI)	Spain	Llucena

== National, Continental and World champions 2016 ==
Date	Discipline	Jersey	Rider	Country	Location
25 June	Austrian National Time Trial Champion		Matthias Brändle (AUT)	Austria	Neumarkt am Wallersee
26 June	Austrian National Road Race Champion		Matthias Brändle (AUT)	Austria	Strasswalchen
26 June	Swiss National Road Race Champion		Jonathan Fumeaux (SUI)	Switzerland	Martigny
