= 2012 Strade Bianche =

Race details
- Dates: 3 March
- Stages: 1
- Distance: 190 km (118.1 mi)
- Winning time: 4h 44' 59"

Results
	Winner	Fabian Cancellara (SWI)	(RadioShack–Nissan)
	Second	Maxim Iglinskiy (KAZ)	(Astana)
	Third	Oscar Gatto (ITA)	(Farnese Vini–Selle Italia)

The 2012 Strade Bianche took place on 3 March 2012. It was the 6th edition of the international classic Strade Bianche. The previous edition was won by Philippe Gilbert, who rode for Omega Pharma–Lotto.

The 2012 race took place in fine weather and was convincingly won by Fabian Cancellara, riding for RadioShack–Nissan. Cancellara is the first rider to have won the race twice, having previously won in 2008 (when riding for Team CSC).

== Results ==
Result
Rank	Rider	Team	Time
1	Fabian Cancellara (SUI)	RadioShack–Nissan	4h 44' 59"
2	Maxim Iglinskiy (KAZ)	Astana	+ 42"
3	Oscar Gatto (ITA)	Farnese Vini–Selle Italia	+ 42"
4	Alessandro Ballan (ITA)	BMC Racing Team	+ 46"
5	Greg van Avermaet (BEL)	BMC Racing Team	+ 48"
6	Roman Kreuziger (CZE)	Astana	+ 1' 03"
7	Francesco Reda (ITA)	Acqua & Sapone	+ 1' 45"
8	Francesco Ginanni (ITA)	Acqua & Sapone	+ 1' 47"
9	Elia Favilli (ITA)	Farnese Vini–Selle Italia	+ 1' 47"
10	Johan Vansummeren (BEL)	Garmin–Barracuda	+ 1' 57"
