= 2012 Scheldeprijs =

Race details
- Dates: 4 April 2012
- Stages: 1
- Distance: 202 km (125.5 mi)
- Winning time: 4h 30' 52"

Results
	Winner	Marcel Kittel (GER)	(Argos–Shimano)
	Second	Tyler Farrar (USA)	(Garmin–Sharp)
	Third	Theo Bos (NED)	(Rabobank)

The 2012 Scheldeprijs was the 100th edition of the Scheldeprijs cycle race and was held on 4 April 2012. The race was won by Marcel Kittel of the Argos–Shimano team.

== General classification ==
Final general classification

Rank	Rider	Team	Time
1	Marcel Kittel (GER)	Argos–Shimano	4h 29' 00"
2	Tyler Farrar (USA)	Garmin–Sharp	+ 0"
3	Theo Bos (NED)	Rabobank	+ 0"
4	Romain Feillu (FRA)	Vacansoleil–DCM	+ 0"
5	Manuel Belletti (ITA)	Ag2r–La Mondiale	+ 0"
6	Elia Favilli (ITA)	Farnese Vini–Selle Italia	+ 0"
7	Alexander Porsev (RUS)	Team Katusha	+ 0"
8	Sébastien Turgot (FRA)	Team Europcar	+ 0"
9	Giacomo Nizzolo (ITA)	RadioShack–Nissan	+ 0"
10	Guillaume Boivin (FRA)	SpiderTech–C10	+ 0"
