= Tess von Piekartz =

Dutch volleyball player (born 1992)

Personal information
- Born: July 24, 1992 (age 34); Ootmarsum, Netherlands
- Height: 1.72 m (5 ft 8 in)

Volleyball information
- Position: Setter

Career
Teams
- Set-Up'65 (Netherlands)
- VV Pollux (Netherlands)
- Team Eurosped (Netherlands)
- USC Münster (Germany)
- Rote Raben Vilsbiburg (Germany)
- Sm'Aesch Pfeffingen (Switzerland)

National team
Netherlands

Tess von Piekartz (born 24 July 1992) is a retired Dutch volleyball player. She played for clubs in the Netherlands, Germany, and Switzerland, and was capped 40 times for the national team.

== Career ==
Von Piekartz began her career with Set-Up'65 in her hometown. In 2010, she joined Dutch top-division club VV Pollux from Oldenzaal, helping the team finish second in the national league.

From 2011 to 2015, she played for USC Münster in the German Bundesliga. She then transferred to Rote Raben Vilsbiburg for one season before moving to Swiss club Sm'Aesch Pfeffingen.

With Sm'Aesch Pfeffingen, she finished runner-up in the Swiss league three consecutive years (2017, 2018, and 2019). She initially retired from professional volleyball in 2019, but returned briefly later that year when the team's regular setter was sidelined due to injury.

== National team ==
Von Piekartz earned 40 caps with the Netherlands women's national volleyball team.

== Honors ==
=== Club ===
- 2011 – Runner-up, Dutch League
- 2017 – Runner-up, Swiss League
- 2018 – Runner-up, Swiss League
- 2019 – Runner-up, Swiss League

== Personal life ==
Tess von Piekartz is in a relationship with former professional cyclist Marcel Kittel. The couple had a son in 2019 and a daughter in 2021.
