= 2016 Tre Valli Varesine =

2016 UCI Europe Tour

Race details
- Dates: 27 September 2016
- Stages: 1
- Distance: 192.9 km (119.9 mi)
- Winning time: 4h 48' 18"

Results
	Winner	Sonny Colbrelli (ITA)	(Bardiani–CSF)
	Second	Diego Ulissi (ITA)	(Lampre–Merida)
	Third	Francesco Gavazzi (ITA)	(Androni Giocattoli–Sidermec)

The 2016 Tre Valli Varesine was the 96th edition of the Tre Valli Varesine road cycling one day race. It was held on 27 September 2016 as part of the 2016 UCI Europe Tour in category 1.HC, over a distance of 192.9 km, starting in Saronno and ending in Varese.

The race was won by Sonny Colbrelli of Bardiani–CSF.

== Teams ==
Twenty-seven teams were invited to take part in the race. These included ten UCI WorldTeams, thirteen UCI Professional Continental teams, three UCI Continental teams and the Italian national team.

UCI WorldTeams

- Astana
- BMC Racing Team
- Team Dimension Data
- FDJ
- Team Giant–Alpecin
- Lampre–Merida
- Movistar Team
- Tinkoff
- Cannondale–Drapac
- Orica–BikeExchange

UCI Professional Continental Teams

- Androni Giocattoli–Sidermec
- Bardiani–CSF
- Bora–Argon 18
- Caja Rural–Seguros RGA
- CCC–Sprandi–Polkowice
- Delko–Marseille Provence KTM
- Team Novo Nordisk
- Stölting Service Group
- Team Roth
- Topsport Vlaanderen–Baloise
- Gazprom–RusVelo
- Nippo–Vini Fantini
- Wilier Triestina–Southeast

UCI Continental Teams

- Adria Mobil
- Norda–MG.K Vis Vega
- Unieuro–Wilier

National team

- Italy

== Results ==
Result
Rank	Rider	Team	Time
1	Sonny Colbrelli (ITA)	Bardiani–CSF	4h 48' 18"
2	Diego Ulissi (ITA)	Lampre–Merida	+ 0"
3	Francesco Gavazzi (ITA)	Androni Giocattoli–Sidermec	+ 0"
4	Tom-Jelte Slagter (NED)	Cannondale–Drapac	+ 0"
5	Giovanni Visconti (ITA)	Movistar Team	+ 0"
6	Philippe Gilbert (BEL)	BMC Racing Team	+ 0"
7	Jens Keukeleire (BEL)	Orica–BikeExchange	+ 0"
8	Gianluca Brambilla (ITA)	Italy	+ 0"
9	Fabio Aru (ITA)	Astana	+ 0"
10	Kristian Sbaragli (ITA)	Team Dimension Data	+ 0"
