= 2016 Grand Prix de Fourmies =

2016 UCI Europe Tour

Race details
- Dates: 4 September 2016
- Stages: 1
- Distance: 205 km (127.4 mi)
- Winning time: 4h 48' 32"

Results
	Winner	Marcel Kittel (GER)
	Second	Nacer Bouhanni (FRA)
	Third	Bryan Coquard (FRA)

The 2016 Grand Prix de Fourmies was the 84th edition of the Grand Prix de Fourmies road cycling one day race. It was held on 4 September 2016 as part of UCI Europe Tour in category 1.HC.

== Teams ==
Twenty-two teams entered the race. Each team had a maximum of eight riders:

UCI WorldTeams

- Etixx–Quick-Step
- FDJ
- Astana
- AG2R La Mondiale
- Lampre–Merida

UCI Professional Continental teams

- Direct Énergie
- Cofidis
- Wanty–Groupe Gobert
- Bora–Argon 18
- Fortuneo–Vital Concept
- Roompot–Oranje Peloton
- Topsport Vlaanderen–Baloise
- Gazprom–RusVelo
- Stölting Service Group
- Nippo–Vini Fantini
- Delko–Marseille Provence KTM
- Wilier Triestina–Southeast

UCI Continental teams

- Wallonie-Bruxelles–Group Protect
- Crelan–Vastgoedservice
- Armée de Terre
- Roubaix–Métropole Européenne de Lille
- HP BTP–Auber93

== Result ==
Final general classification

Rank	Rider	Team	Time
1	Marcel Kittel (GER)	Etixx–Quick-Step	4h 48' 32"
2	Nacer Bouhanni (FRA)	Cofidis	s.t.
3	Bryan Coquard (FRA)	Direct Énergie	s.t.
4	Romain Feillu (FRA)	HP BTP–Auber93	s.t.
5	Manuel Belletti (ITA)	Wilier Triestina–Southeast	s.t.
6	Arnaud Démare (FRA)	FDJ	s.t.
7	Amaury Capiot (BEL)	Topsport Vlaanderen–Baloise	s.t.
8	Sam Bennett (IRL)	Bora–Argon 18	s.t.
9	Samuel Dumoulin (FRA)	AG2R La Mondiale	s.t.
10	Baptiste Planckaert (BEL)	Wallonie-Bruxelles–Group Protect	s.t.
