= Coppa Città di Offida =

Coppa Città di Offida-Trofeo Beato Bernardo
Race details
- Date: August
- Region: Marche, Italy
- Discipline: Road race
- Competition: UCI Europe Tour
- Type: Single day race

History
- Editions: 19 (as of 2016)
- Most recent: Enrico Salvador (ITA)

The Coppa Città di Offida-Trofeo Beato Bernardo is a one-day cycling race held annually in Italy. It is part of UCI Europe Tour in category 1.2U. It was held as a junior race from 2007 to 2009.

== Winners ==
Year	Winner	Second	Third
2007	(Italy) Elia Favilli	(Italy) Alfredo Balloni	(Italy) Salvatore Puccio
2008	(Italy) Francesco Bongiorno	(Italy) Enrico Barbin	(Italy) Antoni Orsani
2009	(Italy) Pierre Paolo Penasa	(Australia) Patrick Lane	(Italy) Davide Formolo
2009	(Italy) Mirko Trosino	(Italy) Antony Orsani	(Australia) Aaron Donnelly
2016	(Italy) Enrico Salvador	(Italy) Filippo Zaccanti	(Italy) Filippo Rocchetta
