= 2013 Scheldeprijs =

- Event poster with previous winner Marcel Kittel

Race details
- Dates: 3 April 2013
- Stages: 1
- Distance: 204 km (126.8 mi)
- Winning time: 4h 41' 00"

Results
	Winner	Marcel Kittel (GER)	(Argos–Shimano)
	Second	Mark Cavendish (GBR)	(Omega Pharma–Quick-Step)
	Third	Barry Markus (NED)	(Vacansoleil–DCM)

The 2013 Scheldeprijs was the 101st edition of the Scheldeprijs cycle race and was held on 3 April 2013. The race was won by Marcel Kittel of the Argos–Shimano team.

== General classification ==
Final general classification

Rank	Rider	Team	Time
1	Marcel Kittel (GER)	Argos–Shimano	4h 41' 00"
2	Mark Cavendish (GBR)	Omega Pharma–Quick-Step	+ 0"
3	Barry Markus (NED)	Vacansoleil–DCM	+ 0"
4	Andrea Guardini (ITA)	Astana	+ 0"
5	Alexander Kristoff (NOR)	Team Katusha	+ 0"
6	Tyler Farrar (ITA)	Garmin–Sharp	+ 0"
7	Kenny Dehaes (BEL)	Lotto–Belisol	+ 0"
8	Theo Bos (NED)	Belkin Pro Cycling	+ 0"
9	Romain Feillu (FRA)	Vacansoleil–DCM	+ 0"
10	Michael Van Staeyen (BEL)	Topsport Vlaanderen–Baloise	+ 0"
