= Romain Feillu =

French road bicycle racer

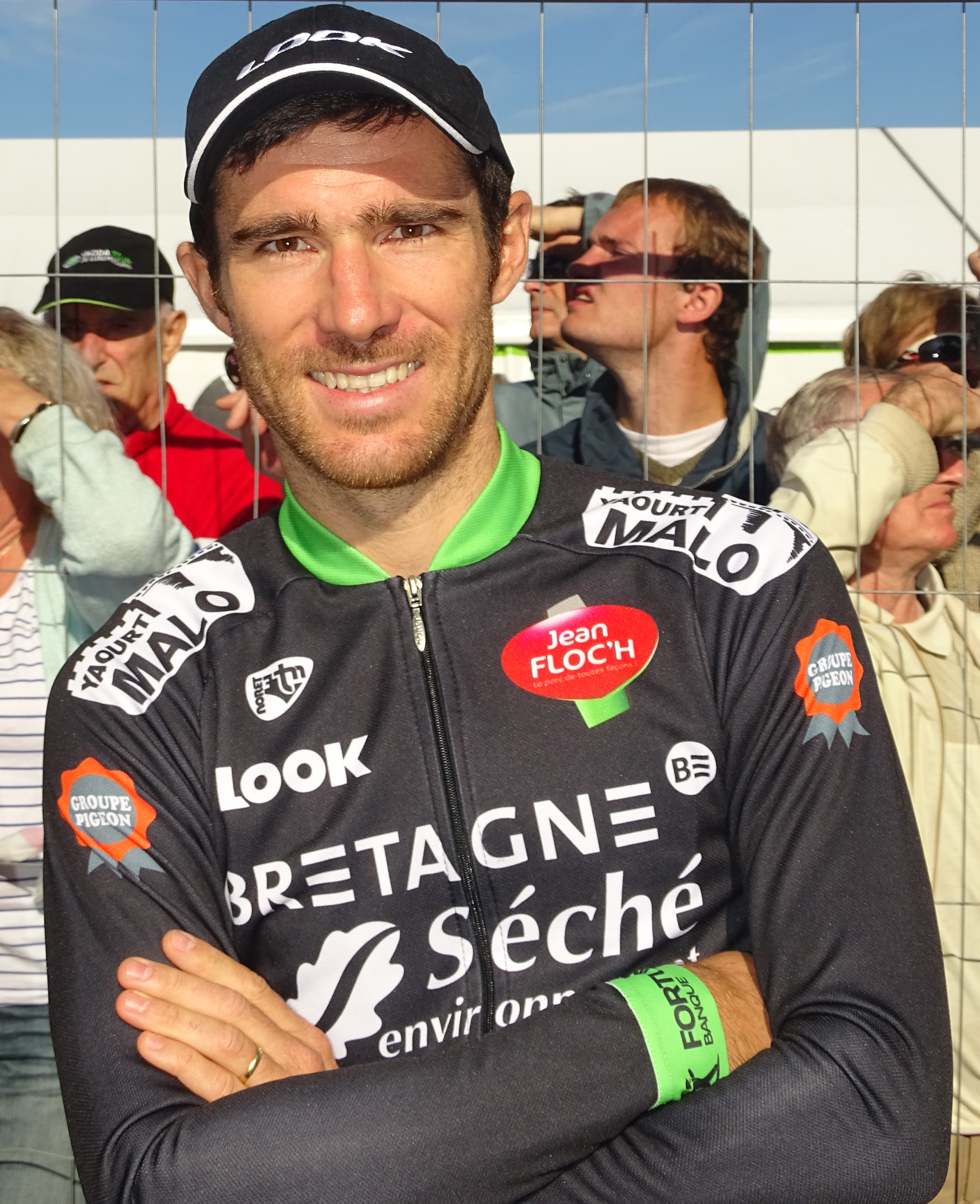
- Feillu at the 2015 Grand Prix d'Isbergues

Personal information
- Full name: Romain Feillu
- Born: 16 April 1984 (age 42) Châteaudun, France
- Height: 1.74 m (5 ft 9 in)
- Weight: 62 kg (137 lb)

Cycling career
- Sport: Cycling
- Current team: Retired
- Discipline: Road
- Role: Rider
- Rider type: Sprinter

Amateur team
- 2005: Agritubel–Loudun (stagiaire)

Professional teams
- 2006–2009: Agritubel
- 2010–2013: Vacansoleil
- 2014–2015: Bretagne–Séché Environnement
- 2016–2019: HP BTP–Auber93

Major wins
- Stage races Tour of Britain (2007) One-day races and Classics GP de Fourmies (2009, 2010)

Romain Feillu (born 16 April 1984) is a French former road racing cyclist, who rode professionally between 2006 and 2019. He is the older brother of Brice Feillu, who also competed professionally as a cyclist.

== Career ==
Feillu was born in Châteaudun, Eure-et-Loir. In August 2005, Feillu joined Agritubel–Loudun as a trainee (stagiaire) and impressed his team managers, resulting in a professional contract. During the 2006 season he won the Grand Prix Tours as well as the overall rankings of the Tour de la Somme. In 2007 he won a stage in the Tour de Luxembourg and the Circuit de l'Aulne. In that year he also made his Tour de France debut finishing three times in the top 10 in mass sprints. He withdrew after stage 8, which was the second mountain stage. Later that year he won the Tour of Britain and the late season Paris–Bourges.

At the end of the 2009 season, he won the Grand Prix de Fourmies. He won this race again in 2010.

Feillu joined Bretagne–Séché Environnement for the 2014 season, after his previous team – Vacansoleil–DCM – folded at the end of the 2013 season.

== Major results ==
2005
7th Overall Tour de la Somme
8th Paris–Bourges
8th Paris–Tours Espoirs
2006
1st Overall Tour de la Somme
1st Grand Prix Tours
2nd Road race, UCI Under-23 Road World Championships
2nd La Côte Picarde
4th Overall Giro della Toscana
5th Grand Prix de la Ville de Lillers
10th Overall Tour de Normandie
2007
1st Overall Tour of Britain
1st Boucles de l'Aulne
1st Paris–Bourges
4th Cholet-Pays de Loire
4th Châteauroux Classic
7th Grand Prix d'Isbergues
8th Overall Tour de Picardie
8th Overall Boucles de la Mayenne
10th Overall Tour de Luxembourg

1st Stage 3

10th Paris–Tours
2008
1st Boucles de l'Aulne
3rd Châteauroux Classic
7th Overall Boucles de la Mayenne
8th GP Ouest–France
Tour de France

& Held after Stage 3

2009
1st Grand Prix de Fourmies
1st Stage 4 Tour du Limousin
2nd Overall Tour de Picardie

1st Points classification
1st Young rider classification
1st Stage 2

2nd Paris–Camembert
2nd Châteauroux Classic
3rd Route Adélie
5th Boucles du Sud Ardèche
5th Grand Prix de Wallonie
7th Tour du Finistère
7th Grand Prix de la Somme
8th Paris–Brussels
9th Cholet-Pays de Loire
10th Paris–Bourges
2010
1st Grand Prix de Fourmies
Vuelta a Burgos

1st Points classification
1st Stage 4

1st Stage 2 Tour de l'Ain
2nd Châteauroux Classic
2nd Paris–Brussels
2nd Paris–Bourges
3rd Grand Prix d'Isbergues
4th Kampioenschap van Vlaanderen
5th Cholet-Pays de Loire
6th Paris–Tours
10th Road race, UCI Road World Championships
10th Grand Prix d'Ouverture La Marseillaise
10th GP Ouest–France
2011
1st Overall Tour de Picardie

1st Stage 2

1st Tour du Finistère
Tour Méditerranéen

1st Stages 2, 3 & 4

1st Stage 5 Circuit de Lorraine
1st Stage 5 Tour de Luxembourg
2nd Grand Prix de Denain
3rd Grand Prix d'Ouverture La Marseillaise
6th Road race, UCI Road World Championships
7th Grand Prix Pino Cerami
7th Grand Prix de Fourmies
7th Grand Prix d'Isbergues
8th Paris–Bourges
2012
2nd Grand Prix Pino Cerami
3rd Boucles de l'Aulne
4th Scheldeprijs
5th Classic Loire Atlantique
6th Cholet-Pays de Loire
7th Le Samyn
9th Tro-Bro Léon
9th Grand Prix de Plumelec-Morbihan
2013
2nd Grand Prix Pino Cerami
8th Kampioenschap van Vlaanderen
9th Scheldeprijs
9th Grand Prix d'Isbergues
10th Tour de Vendée
2014
2nd Châteauroux Classic
3rd Overall Ronde de l'Oise

1st Stage 1

10th Grand Prix de Fourmies
2015
1st Route Adélie
5th Paris–Bourges
7th Omloop van het Houtland
8th Grand Prix d'Isbergues
10th Arnhem–Veenendaal Classic
2016
2nd Grand Prix d'Isbergues
3rd Paris–Camembert
4th Grand Prix de Fourmies
4th Tour de Vendée
5th Tour du Finistère
6th Paris–Troyes
7th La Drôme Classic
7th Paris–Bourges
2017
10th La Roue Tourangelle
2018
3rd Grand Prix de la ville de Pérenchies
2019
2nd Grand Prix de la Somme
4th Grand Prix de la ville de Pérenchies
9th Route Adélie
