= 2016 Volta ao Algarve =

UCI Europe Tour

Race details
- Dates: 17–21 February 2016
- Stages: 5
- Distance: 742.9 km (461.6 mi)

Results
| Jersey awarded to the overall winner | Winner | Geraint Thomas (GBR) | (Team Sky) |
| | Second | Ion Izagirre (ESP) | (Movistar Team) |
| | Third | Alberto Contador (ESP) | (Tinkoff) |
| Jersey awarded to the points classification winner | Points | Marcel Kittel (GER) | (Etixx–Quick-Step) |
| Jersey awarded to the mountains classification winner | Mountains | Alexandr Kolobnev (RUS) | (Gazprom–RusVelo) |
| Jersey awarded to the youth classification winner | Youth | Tiesj Benoot (BEL) | (Lotto–Soudal) |
| | Team | Team Katusha | |

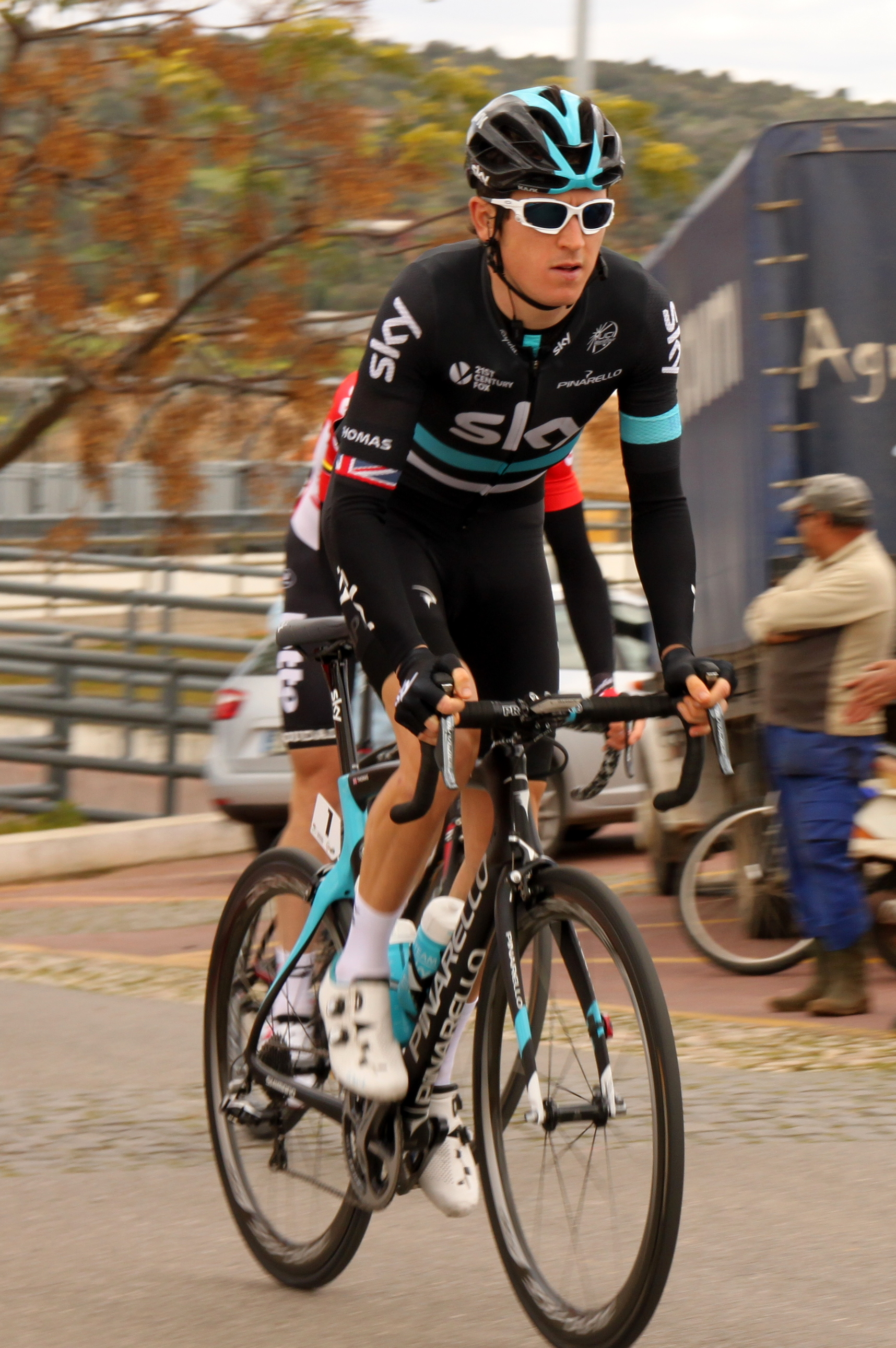
Geraint Thomas at 2016 Volta ao Algarve in Odeceixe

The 2016 Volta ao Algarve was a road cycling stage race that took place in the Algarve region of Portugal between 17 and 21 February 2016. It was the 42nd edition of the Volta ao Algarve and was rated as a 2.1 event as part of the UCI Europe Tour.

The race was won by defending champion, Team Sky's Geraint Thomas.

The race consisted of five stages. Two of these were summit finishes, while the third was an individual time trial.

== Teams ==
The race organisers invited 24 teams to start the race. Twelve of these were UCI WorldTeams; four were UCI Professional Continental teams; eight were UCI Continental teams. Each team could include up to eight riders.

UCI WorldTeams

- Team Sky
- Astana
- Etixx–Quick-Step
- FDJ
- IAM Cycling
- Lotto–Soudal
- Movistar Team
- Team Katusha
- LottoNL–Jumbo
- Tinkoff
- Trek–Segafredo
- Cannondale

UCI Professional Continental teams

- Bora–Argon 18
- Caja Rural–Seguros RGA
- Team Roth
- Gazprom–RusVelo
- Team Novo Nordisk
- Verva ActiveJet

UCI Continental teams

- Efapel
- LA Alumínios–Antarte
- Louletano–Hospital de Loulé
- Sporting Clube de Portugal
- W52–FC Porto–Porto Canal
- Rádio Popular–Boavista

== Route ==
The race includes five stages. The first stage is moderately hilly, with a flat finish. It is followed by a summit finish on the second stage, with the climb of the Alto da Foía, the highest point in the region. The climb has not been used in the Volta ao Algarve since 2002. There is then a flat, 19-kilometre (12 mi) individual time trial on the third stage. Another moderately hilly stage follows on the fourth stage. The fifth and final stage ends with the climb of the Alto do Malhaõ, traditionally the decisive point in the race.

Stage schedule
| Stage | Date | Route | Distance | Type | Winner |
|---|---|---|---|---|---|
| 1 | 17 February | Lagos to Albufeira | 163.6 km (102 mi) | Hilly stage | Marcel Kittel (GER) |
| 2 | 18 February | Lagoa to Alto da Foía | 198.6 km (123 mi) | Mountain stage | Luis León Sánchez (ESP) |
| 3 | 19 February | Sagres to Sagres | 19 km (12 mi) | Individual time trial | Fabian Cancellara (SUI) |
| 4 | 20 February | São Brás de Alportel to Tavira | 215.7 km (134 mi) | Hilly stage | Marcel Kittel (GER) |
| 5 | 21 February | Almodôvar to Alto do Malhaõ | 169 km (105 mi) | Mountain stage | Alberto Contador (ESP) |

== Classifications ==
| Stage | Winner | General classification | Mountains classification | Youth classification | Points classification | Teams classification |
|---|---|---|---|---|---|---|
| 1 | Marcel Kittel | Marcel Kittel | Kamil Gradek | Sebastián Henao | Marcel Kittel | Movistar Team |
| 2 | Luis León Sánchez | Luis León Sánchez | Luis León Sánchez | Héctor Sáez | Luis León Sánchez | Caja Rural–Seguros RGA |
| 3 | Fabian Cancellara | Tony Martin | Geraint Thomas | Tiesj Benoot | Marcel Kittel | Team Katusha |
| 4 | Marcel Kittel | Tony Martin | Geraint Thomas | Tiesj Benoot | Marcel Kittel | Team Katusha |
| 5 | Alberto Contador | Geraint Thomas | Alexandr Kolobnev | Tiesj Benoot | Marcel Kittel | Team Katusha |
| Final | | Geraint Thomas | Alexandr Kolobnev | Tiesj Benoot | Marcel Kittel | Team Katusha |
