= Enrico Salvador =

Italian racing cyclist

Personal information
- Born: 30 November 1994 (age 31) Vittorio Veneto, Italy

Cycling career
- Sport: Cycling
- Discipline: Road
- Role: Rider

Amateur teams
- 2009: SC Fontanafredda
- 2010–2012: GS Caneva Imet 2M Decori ASD
- 2013–2015: Zalf Euromobil Désirée Fior
- 2019–2020: Northwave Cofiloc

Professional teams
- 2016: Unieuro–Wilier
- 2017: Tirol Cycling Team
- 2018: Biesse–Carrera Gavardo

Enrico Salvador (born 30 November 1994 in Vittorio Veneto) is an Italian cyclist, who last rode for amateur team Northwave Cofiloc.

== Major results ==
2012
3rd Road race, National Junior Road Championships
4th Overall Giro di Basilicata

1st Stage 3a

2014
4th Ruota d'Oro
2016
1st Tour de Berne
1st Coppa Città di Offida
2nd Gran Premio di Poggiana
10th Croatia–Slovenia
2019
1st Overall Tour de Serbie

1st Stages 1 & 3a

4th GP Kranj
