= Elia Favilli =

Italian professional road bicycle racer

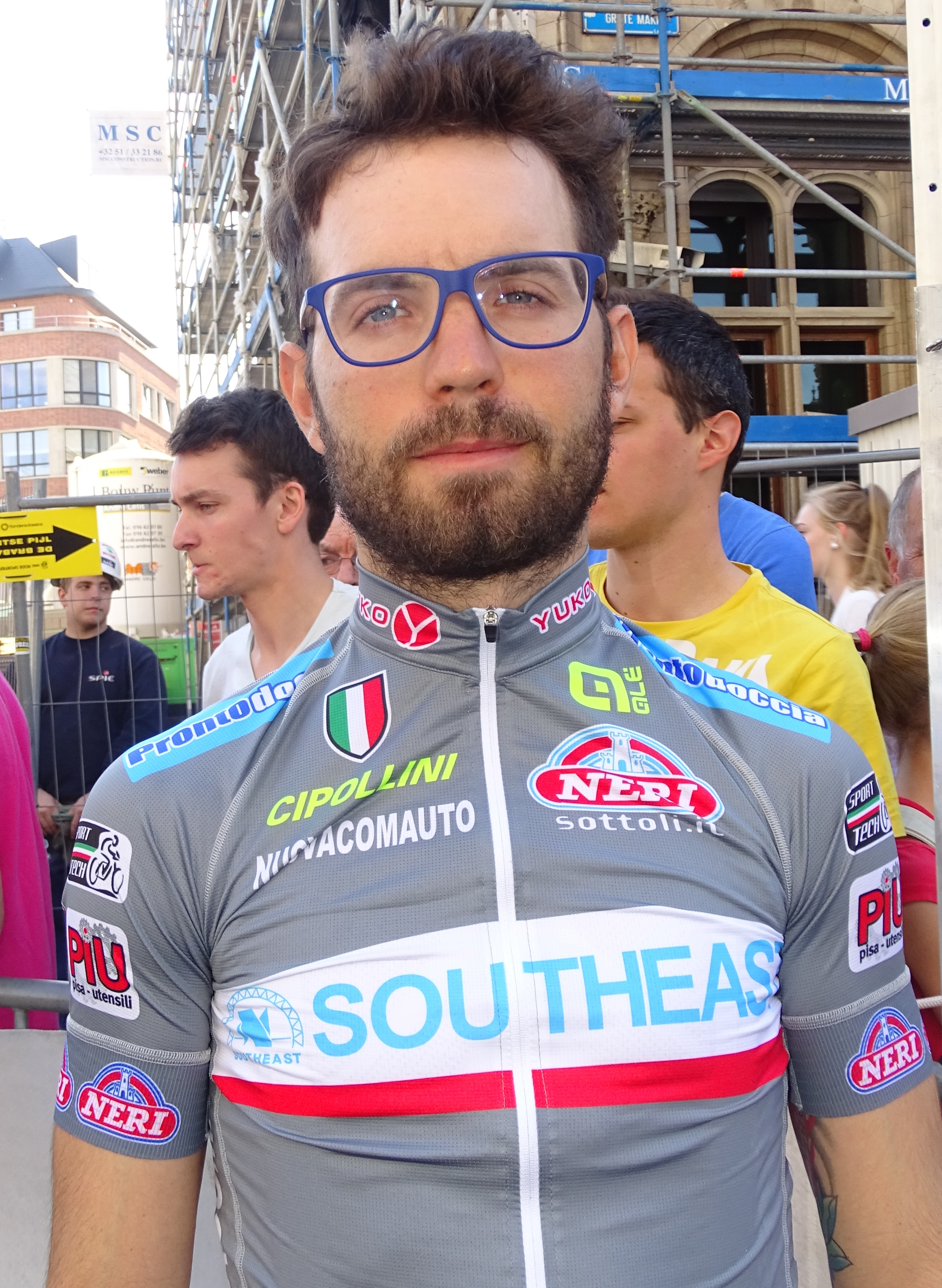

Personal information
- Full name: Elia Favilli
- Nickname: Faina
- Born: 31 January 1989 (age 37) Cecina, Italy
- Height: 1.72 m (5 ft 8 in)
- Weight: 63 kg (139 lb)

Cycling career
- Sport: Cycling
- Discipline: Road
- Role: Rider
- Rider type: Sprinter

Amateur teams
- 2009: Neri Sottoli–Promociclo
- 2009: → ISD (stagiaire)
- 2010: Petroli Firenze
- 2010: → ISD–NERI (stagiaire)

Professional teams
- 2011–2012: Farnese Vini–Neri Sottoli
- 2013–2014: Lampre–Merida
- 2015: Southeast Pro Cycling
- 2016: Meridiana–Kamen

Elia Favilli (born 31 January 1989) is an Italian former professional road bicycle racer, who rode professionally between 2011 and 2016.

Born in Cecina, Tuscany, Favilli was also a member of the Arianna Rimor and AGI Neri Lucchini Sprint teams as a junior, finishing second in the Italian junior championships, as well as winning a bronze medal in the world championships – as part of an all-Italian podium alongside Diego Ulissi and Daniele Ratto – in Aguascalientes, Mexico. After moving out of the junior ranks, Favilli competed for the Neri Sottoli-Promociclo and Petroli Firenze teams as an amateur, and also had two stagiaire spells with Farnese Vini–Selle Italia, when it was known as ISD and ISD–NERI in 2009 and 2010 respectively.

== Major results ==
2007
1st Gran Premio Ellegi
1st Pisa–Livorno
1st Memorial Arena e Pezzato
1st Gran Premio FM Plastic
1st Coppa Sportivi di Bagnolo
1st Trofeo Beato Bernardo
1st Trofeo città di Lucca
2nd Road race, National Junior Road Championships
2nd Coppa Ocria
2nd Trofeo Guido Dorigo
3rd Road race, UCI Juniors World Championships
3rd Memorial Maresciallo Sorvillo
3rd Trofeo il miglio
2008
3rd GP Calvatone
3rd Trofeo Madonna delle Grazie
2009
1st Giro del Compitese
1st Trofeo Città di Venturina
2nd GP Città di Valeggio
7th Trofeo Franco Balestra
2010
1st Giro delle Due Province Marciana
1st Trofeo Petroli Firenze
1st Gran Premio Città di Vinci
2nd Trofeo Città di Brescia
2nd GP La Torre
2nd G.P. Montanino
2011
3rd Gran Premio della Costa Etruschi
10th Classica Sarda
2012
3rd Overall Giro della Provincia di Reggio Calabria
6th Scheldeprijs
9th Strade Bianche
9th Coppa Bernocchi
10th Giro di Toscana
2013
3rd Gran Premio Bruno Beghelli
9th Trofeo Laigueglia

=== Grand Tour general classification results timeline ===
Grand Tour	2011	2012	2013	2014	2015
Giro d'Italia	158	DNF	—	—	104
Tour de France	—	—	128	—	—
Vuelta a España	—	—	—	109	—

Legend
—	Did not compete
DNF	Did not finish
