= 2016 Paris–Tours =

110th Paris–Tours
2016 UCI Europe Tour

Race details
- Dates: 9 October 2016
- Stages: 1
- Distance: 252.5 km (156.9 mi)
- Winning time: 5h 22' 03"

Results
	Winner	Fernando Gaviria (COL)	(Etixx–Quick-Step)
	Second	Arnaud Démare (FRA)	(FDJ)
	Third	Jonas Van Genechten (BEL)	(IAM Cycling)

The 110th edition of the Paris–Tours cycling classic was held on 9 October 2016. The race was part of the 2016 UCI Europe Tour, ranked as a 1.HC event. Fernando Gaviria became the first Colombian winner of Paris–Tours with a late attack in the final kilometer. Frenchman Arnaud Démare was second, Belgian Jonas Van Genechten third.

== Route ==
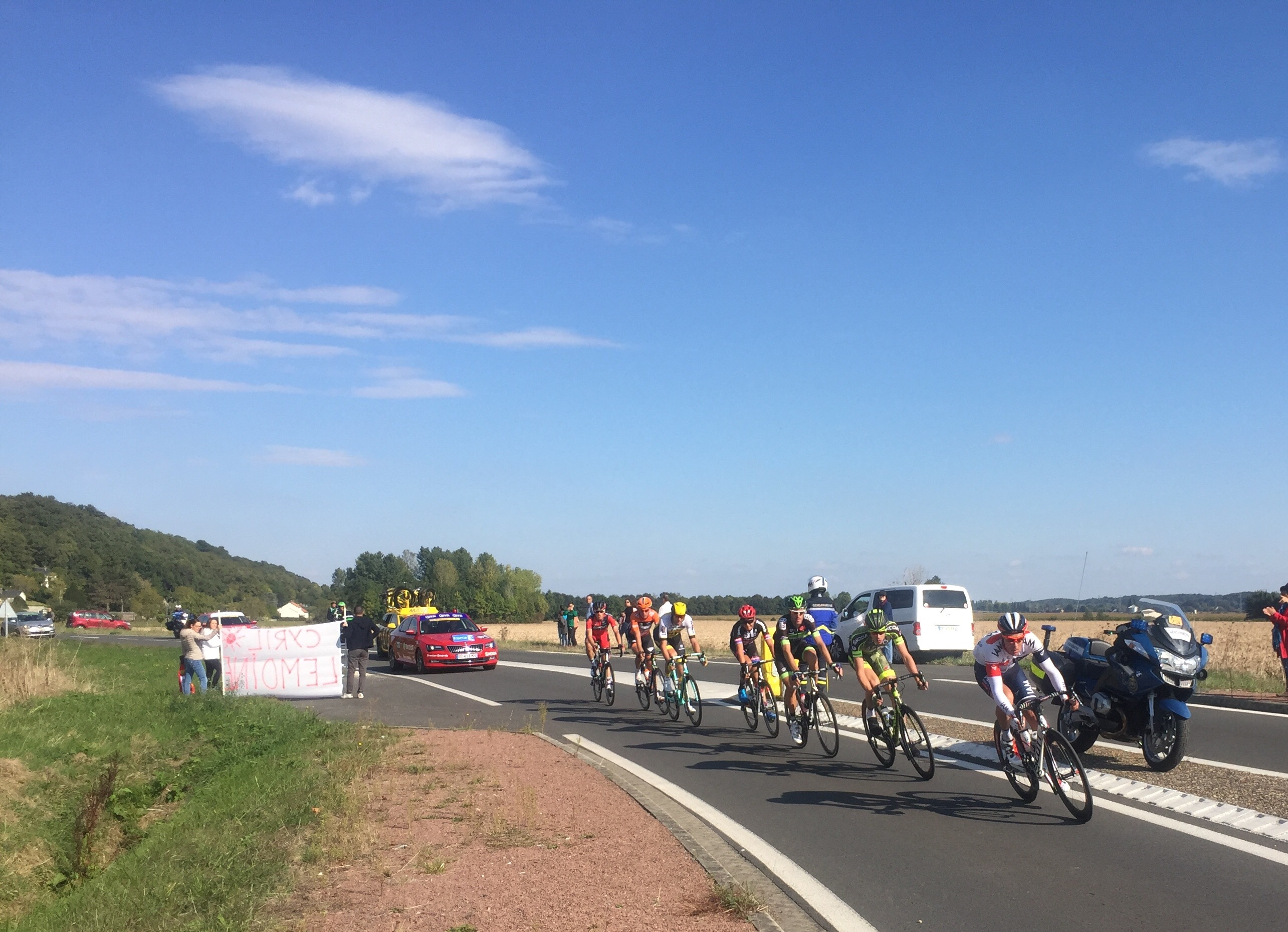
Paris tour 2016

The race started in Dreux, 70 km (43 mi) west of Paris, and finished in Tours, in the center-west of France, after 252.5 km (156.9 mi) of racing. The edition featured no significant climbs.

The event was exceptionally scheduled one week before the Road World Championships in Qatar, because of milder temperatures in Qatar later in October. Organizers adjusted the race finale, as they wanted to emulate the flat world championship course, spurring prominent sprinters to contest this year's Paris–Tours.

== Teams ==
188 riders of 24 teams started the race. Each team had a maximum of eight riders:

UCI WorldTeams

- Etixx–Quick-Step
- Astana
- IAM Cycling
- Team Giant–Alpecin
- Team Sky
- BMC Racing Team
- FDJ
- Lotto–Soudal
- LottoNL–Jumbo
- AG2R La Mondiale
- Team Dimension Data
- Team Katusha
- Orica–BikeExchange

UCI Professional Continental teams

- Bora–Argon 18
- Direct Énergie
- Topsport Vlaanderen–Baloise
- Cofidis
- Fortuneo–Vital Concept
- Wanty–Groupe Gobert
- Delko–Marseille Provence KTM
- Roompot–Oranje Peloton

UCI Continental teams

- Armée de Terre
- Roubaix–Métropole Européenne de Lille
- HP BTP–Auber93

== Results ==
Final general classification

Rank	Rider	Team	Time
1	Fernando Gaviria (COL)	Etixx–Quick-Step	5h 22' 03"
2	Arnaud Démare (FRA)	FDJ	s.t.
3	Jonas van Genechten (BEL)	IAM Cycling	s.t.
4	Matteo Trentin (ITA)	Etixx–Quick-Step	s.t.
5	Bryan Coquard (FRA)	Direct Énergie	s.t.
6	Mark Cavendish (GBR)	Team Dimension Data	s.t.
7	Nacer Bouhanni (FRA)	Cofidis	s.t.
8	Jens Debusschere (BEL)	Lotto–Soudal	s.t.
9	Luka Mezgec (SLO)	Orica–BikeExchange	s.t.
10	Jempy Drucker (LUX)	BMC Racing Team	s.t.
