= 2016 Brabantse Pijl =

2016 UCI Europe Tour
- Event poster with previous winner Ben Hermans

Race details
- Dates: 13 April 2016
- Stages: 1
- Distance: 203 km (126.1 mi)
- Winning time: 4h 49' 35"

Results
	Winner	Petr Vakoč (CZE)	(Etixx–Quick-Step)
	Second	Enrico Gasparotto (ITA)	(Wanty–Groupe Gobert)
	Third	Tony Gallopin (FRA)	(Lotto–Soudal)

The 2016 Brabantse Pijl (English: Brabant Arrow, French: La Flèche Brabançonne) was a one-day cycling road race that took place on 13 April 2016. The course ran 203 kilometres (126 mi) from Leuven to Overijse in Flanders. The race was the 56th edition of the Brabantse Pijl and was rated as a 1.HC event as part of the 2016 UCI Europe Tour.

== Race ==
The race was organised by Flanders Classics and marked the transition from the cobbled classics in Flanders to the Ardennes classics in Wallonia. The race included 26 helligen (small hills) that formed the principal difficulty in the race. The race therefore suited the puncheurs, such as Ben Hermans (BMC Racing Team), the defending champion. Other favourites included Michael Matthews (Orica–GreenEDGE), Tom-Jelte Slagter (Cannondale), Julian Alaphilippe (Etixx–Quick-Step) and Tony Gallopin (Lotto–Soudal). One of the other favourites for the race, Philippe Gilbert (BMC), was ruled out of the race with a broken finger after an "altercation" with a driver during training.

After attacks throughout the latter half of the race, a five-man group formed in the final 5 kilometres (3.1 mi), made up of Alaphilippe, Gallopin, Petr Vakoč (Etixx–Quick-Step), David Tanner (IAM Cycling) and Enrico Gasparotto (Wanty–Groupe Gobert). Alaphilippe put in a long effort in support of Vakoč, which dropped Tanner. On the final climb, Vakoč attacked and no one was able to follow. He finished six seconds ahead of Gasparotto, with Gallopin third. Bryan Coquard (Direct Énergie) beat Matthews in the sprint for fourth place, 20 seconds behind Vakoč.

== Results ==
Result (top 10)
Rank	Rider	Team	Time
1	Petr Vakoč (CZE)	Etixx–Quick-Step	4h 49' 35"
2	Enrico Gasparotto (ITA)	Wanty–Groupe Gobert	+ 6"
3	Tony Gallopin (FRA)	Lotto–Soudal	+ 12"
4	Bryan Coquard (FRA)	Direct Énergie	+ 20"
5	Michael Matthews (AUS)	Orica–GreenEDGE	+ 20"
6	Sonny Colbrelli (ITA)	Bardiani–CSF	+ 20"
7	Maurits Lammertink (NED)	Roompot–Oranje Peloton	+ 20"
8	Julian Alaphilippe (FRA)	Etixx–Quick-Step	+ 20"
9	Tom-Jelte Slagter (NED)	Cannondale	+ 20"
10	Loïc Vliegen (BEL)	BMC Racing Team	+ 20"
