= 2016 Scheldeprijs =

Race details
- Dates: 6 April 2016
- Stages: 1
- Distance: 207.8 km (129.1 mi)
- Winning time: 4h 54' 05"

Results
	Winner	Marcel Kittel (GER)	(Etixx–Quick-Step)
	Second	Mark Cavendish (GBR)	(Team Dimension Data)
	Third	André Greipel (GER)	(Lotto–Soudal)

The 2016 Scheldeprijs is a one-day semi-classic cycling race that took place in Belgium on 6 April 2016. The race began in Antwerp and finished in Schoten, covering a course of 207.8 kilometres (129.1 mi). It is rated as a 1.HC event as part of the 2016 UCI Europe Tour.

Unlike other spring classics such as Paris–Roubaix and the Tour of Flanders, the Scheldeprijs is suited particularly for the sprinters, such as the defending champion, Alexander Kristoff (Team Katusha). Marcel Kittel (Etixx–Quick-Step) and Mark Cavendish (Team Dimension Data) had both won the race three times. The finish was changed from previous years, with two extra corners added in the race finale in an attempt to improve safety. The route was flat throughout and finished with three laps of a circuit in Schoten.

The race was won by Kittel in a sprint finish, with Cavendish second and André Greipel (Lotto–Soudal) third.

== Teams ==
There were 22 teams participating in the race. Of these, thirteen were UCI WorldTeams and nine were UCI Professional Continental teams.

UCI WorldTeams

- Team Katusha
- Etixx–Quick-Step
- Lotto–Soudal
- AG2R La Mondiale
- Astana
- Team Dimension Data
- FDJ
- Team Giant–Alpecin
- LottoNL–Jumbo
- Team Sky
- Tinkoff
- Trek–Segafredo
- Cannondale

UCI Professional Continental teams

- Bora–Argon 18
- CCC–Sprandi–Polkowice
- Cofidis
- Direct Énergie
- Fortuneo–Vital Concept
- Roompot–Oranje Peloton
- Topsport Vlaanderen–Baloise
- Wanty–Groupe Gobert
- Southeast–Venezuela

== Result ==
Result (top 10)
Rank	Rider	Team	Time
1	Marcel Kittel (GER)	Etixx–Quick-Step	4h 54' 05"
2	Mark Cavendish (GBR)	Team Dimension Data	+ 0"
3	André Greipel (GER)	Lotto–Soudal	+ 0"
4	Edward Theuns (BEL)	Trek–Segafredo	+ 0"
5	Niccolò Bonifazio (ITA)	Trek–Segafredo	+ 0"
6	Danny van Poppel (NED)	Team Sky	+ 0"
7	Nikias Arndt (GER)	Team Giant–Alpecin	+ 0"
8	Wouter Wippert (NED)	Cannondale	+ 0"
9	Dylan Groenewegen (NED)	LottoNL–Jumbo	+ 0"
10	Daniel McLay (GBR)	Fortuneo–Vital Concept	+ 0"
