= Marcel Kittel =

German road cyclist

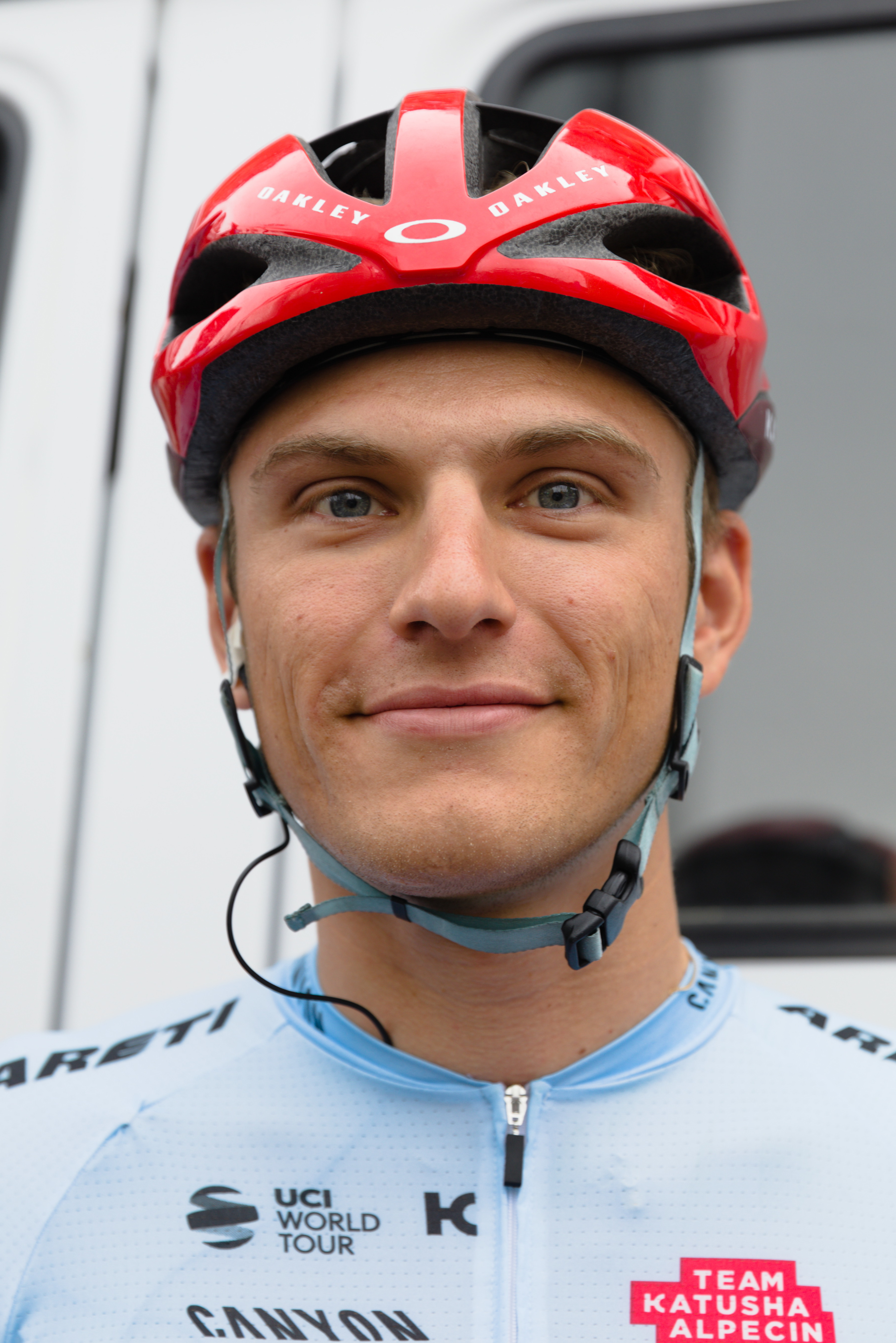
- Kittel in 2018

Personal information
- Full name: Marcel Kittel
- Born: 11 May 1988 (age 38) Arnstadt, Bezirk Erfurt, East Germany
- Height: 1.88 m (6 ft 2 in)
- Weight: 82 kg (181 lb; 12 st 13 lb)

Cycling career
- Sport: Cycling
- Discipline: Road
- Role: Rider
- Rider type: Sprinter

Amateur team
- 2007–2010: Thüringer Energie Team

Professional teams
- 2011–2015: Skil–Shimano
- 2016–2017: Etixx–Quick-Step
- 2018–2019: Team Katusha–Alpecin

Major wins
- Grand Tours Tour de France 14 individual stages (2013, 2014, 2016, 2017) Giro d'Italia 4 individual stages (2014, 2016) Vuelta a España 1 individual stage (2011) Stage races Dubai Tour (2016, 2017) One-day races and Classics Scheldeprijs (2012, 2013, 2014, 2016, 2017) Münsterland Giro (2011, 2012) GP de Fourmies (2016)
Medal record
Men's road bicycle racing
World Championships
Representing Germany
Gold medal – first place	2005 Vienna	Junior time trial
Gold medal – first place	2006 Spa & Gent	Junior time trial
Representing Etixx–Quick-Step
Gold medal – first place	2016 Doha	Team time trial

Marcel Kittel (born 11 May 1988) is a German former racing cyclist, who rode professionally between 2011 and 2019 for the Team Giant–Alpecin, Quick-Step Floors and Team Katusha–Alpecin squads. As a junior, he specialised in time trials, winning a bronze medal in the World Championships for cyclists aged under 23. When he became a professional in 2011, he specialised in bunch sprints, winning 19 stages across the three Grand Tours, and taking 89 wins in his professional career.

After retirement, he started working as ambassador for Endura and ROSE Bikes. Since 2021 he has been Tour de France analyst for Dutch national broadcaster NOS. Starting from the 2026 Season, he will be returning to professional Sports as "Sprint Coach" for the Unibet Tietema Rockets

== Personal life ==
Kittel is in a relationship with Dutch volleyball player Tess von Piekartz. The couple had a son in 2019 and a daughter in 2021.

== Career ==
=== Skil–Shimano (2011–15) ===
==== 2011 season ====
Kittel made his professional debut in 2011 with the Dutch team Skil–Shimano. Known as a time trial specialist at the time, he won a bunch sprint during the Tour de Langkawi. After the success he decided to become a sprinter. He then won four out of five stages in the Four Days of Dunkirk, all in bunch sprints. Kittel won his first World Tour stage, winning the opening stage of the Tour de Pologne, a race where he also won three other stages. He also made his Grand Tour debut in the Vuelta a España, where he won the seventh stage beating Peter Sagan and Óscar Freire. He finished the season off by winning two stages at the Herald Sun Tour. Kittel became the second most winning rider in 2011 - with 17 wins.

==== 2012 season ====
Kittel made his Tour de France debut in 2012 when he was selected as leader of his team, where he would compete for stage wins and the green jersey. However he withdrew an hour into stage 5, after suffering from a viral infection of the stomach and intestines from stage 2, the fourth retirement of the 2012 Tour. He bounced back at the beginning of August, when he won the first stage of the Eneco Tour, the first event in his return to racing. The only rider who was competitive with him in the final bunch sprint was Frenchman Arnaud Démare (FDJ–BigMat). After bad luck struck on stage 3, where he suffered a flat tyre with 5 kilometres (3.1 miles) to go, Kittel prevailed again on stage 4. He congratulated his teammates Tom Veelers and John Degenkolb for their work in the final kilometres, as they sheltered him from the wind before he propelled himself toward the finish line and the victory. At the end of 2012, as the cycling world was affected by the Lance Armstrong doping case revelations, Kittel took a vocal anti-doping stance by stating that he was "sick" of the people who still defended Armstrong in the cycling community.

==== 2013 season ====
In 2013, Kittel's team Argos–Shimano was promoted to the first division of the sport and was granted World Tour status. Kittel won the first stage of the Tour of Oman in a sprint finish, his first success of the season. In the Tour de France, Kittel found success as a sprinter. He finished first in the Tour's first stage in Corsica and took the first maillot jaune of the 100th Tour de France. He lost the yellow jersey the next day, however, to Jan Bakelants of RadioShack–Leopard. Kittel was not done in this Tour, though, he would go on to win the 10th and 12th stages. On the final stage, Kittel triumphed again on the Champs-Élysées, ending the four-year winning streak of Omega Pharma–Quick-Step rider Mark Cavendish. He would finish 4th in the Green Jersey points standings.

==== 2014 season ====
Kittel started the 2014 season early by winning the Down Under Classic, followed by three consecutive stage wins at the Dubai Tour. On the third stage, he survived two short climbs near the end of the race and won the sprint of a greatly reduced group. In April he won the Scheldeprijs for the third time in a row, the first rider to achieve this. In the Giro d'Italia, Kittel won stages 2 and 3 in Belfast and Dublin respectively, but abandoned the race before it reached Italian soil. As he did in 2013, Kittel won the opening stage at the Tour de France and took the yellow jersey, but lost it to Vincenzo Nibali on stage 2. However, Kittel won both stages 3 and 4. He also won the final stage 21 on the Champs-Élysées in Paris, as he did in 2013. In September, Kittel won the opening stage of the Tour of Britain by outsprinting Nicola Ruffoni and Mark Cavendish. He also won the closing stage.

==== 2015 season ====
In January, Kittel won the Down Under Classic in Australia for the second year in a row. By the end of April, he had competed in only two UCI races: the Tour Down Under and the Tour of Qatar. He failed to participate in any sprints in those races, as he was plagued by a virus. He returned to competition in May in the Tour de Yorkshire, but he dropped out after riding 100 kilometres (62 miles) in the first stage. He was supposed to make another comeback at the Tour of California but he withdrew days before the event, citing illness once again. He did ride the Ster ZLM Toer, but could not finish in the top 10 of a stage. At the end of June, it was announced that Kittel would not participate in the Tour de France, since his condition was not up to par. "Not being nominated [for the Tour] is without doubt the most difficult time of my career," said Kittel a day after his non-selection was made public.

=== Etixx–Quick-Step (2016–17) ===
In October 2015, it was announced that he had signed a two-year deal with Etixx–Quick-Step from 2016, after Team Giant–Alpecin released him from his contract a year early.

==== 2016 season ====
At the Dubai Tour, his first race of the season, he won two stages, the overall classification as well as the points classification. He carried on his successes to the Portuguese race Volta ao Algarve, winning stage 1 by a significant margin over André Greipel. He also won stage 4 and the points classification jersey.

==== 2017 season ====
Kittel won five stages in the Tour de France, bringing his total of Tour de France stage victories to fourteen.

=== Team Katusha–Alpecin (2018–19) ===
==== 2018 season ====
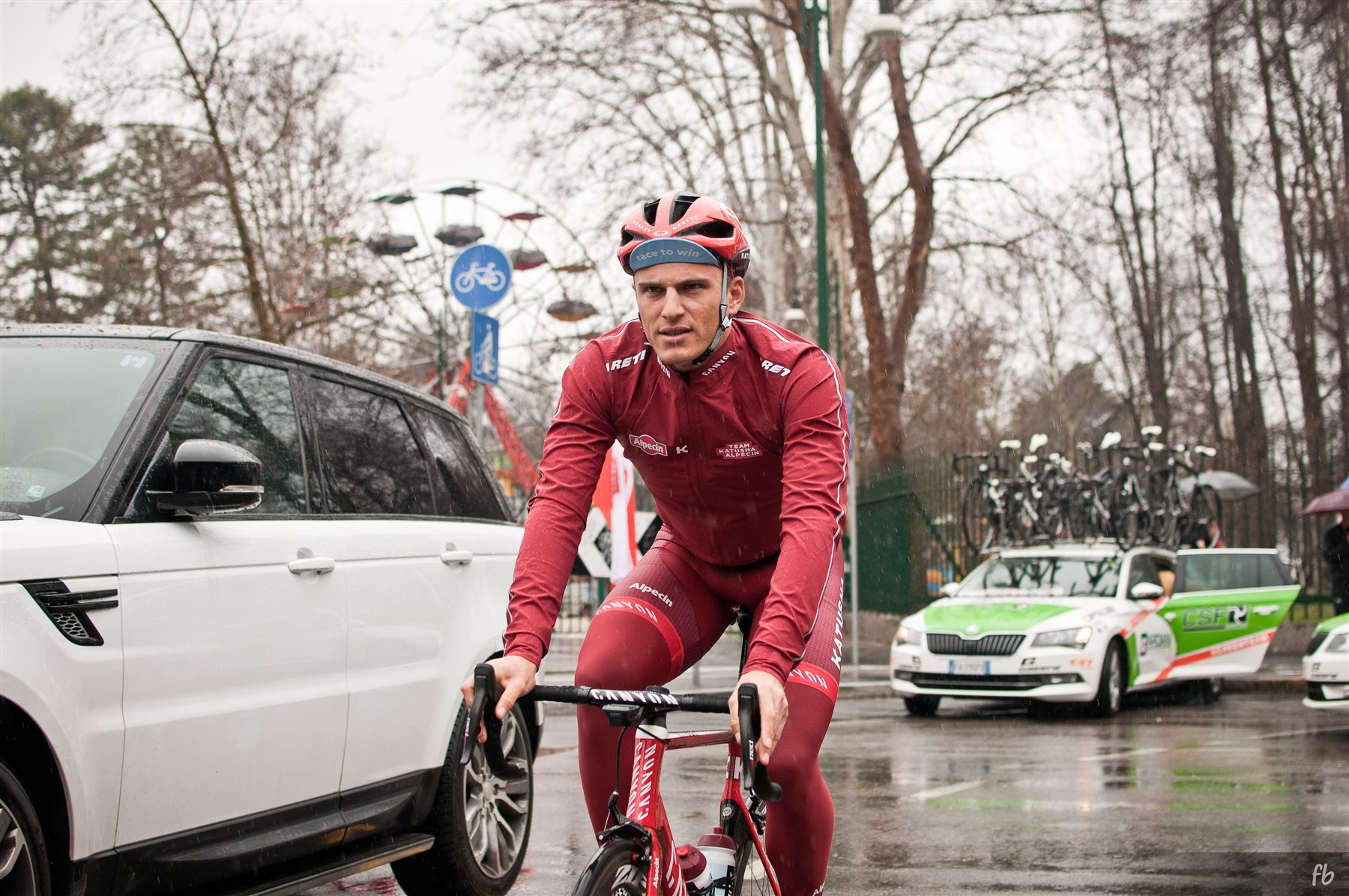
Kittel at the start of the 2018 Milan–San Remo

For the third year in a row, he chose to start his season at the Dubai Tour, but was unable to win any stages. Kittel took two wins in the 2018 season, both of which came at Tirreno–Adriatico.

==== 2019 season ====
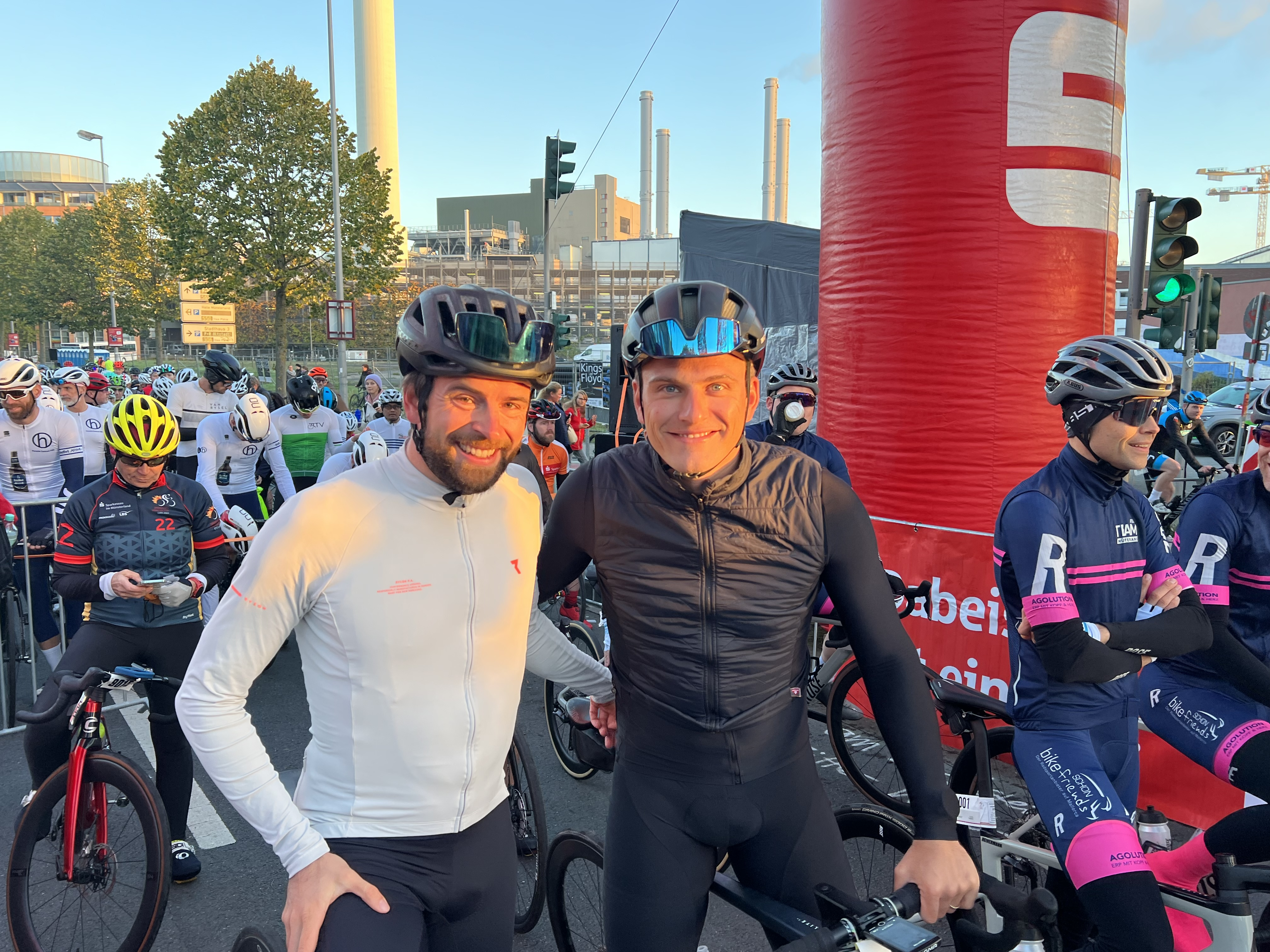
Marcel Kittel with Jonas Deichmann

Kittel started the 2019 season strongly, winning the Trofeo Palma, part of the Challenge Mallorca, and taking second place at the Clásica de Almería. He pulled out of the Tour of California and the Tour de Yorkshire before the races started, citing health issues. On 9 May 2019, his contract with Team Katusha–Alpecin was terminated. This was a mutual decision by the team management and Kittel, who opted to take time off from professional cycling because of fatigue.

Kittel announced his retirement from professional cycling on 23 August 2019.

== Major results ==
2004
1st Road race, National Novice Road Championships
2005
1st Time trial, UCI Junior Road World Championships
2nd Time trial, National Junior Road Championships
2006
1st Time trial, UCI Junior Road World Championships
National Junior Road Championships

1st Time trial
1st Team time trial

1st Stage 3a (ITT) Trofeo Karlsberg
2007
1st Time trial, National Under-23 Road Championships
1st Stage 4 Brandenburg Rundfahrt
2008
1st Grosser Silber-Pils Preiss
1st Memorial Davide Fardelli
2nd Overall Brandenburg Rundfahrt

1st Stage 5

2009
1st Time trial, UEC European Under-23 Road Championships
1st Stage 6 Thüringen Rundfahrt der U23
4th Time trial, UCI Under-23 Road World Championships
4th Neuseen Classics
6th La Côte Picarde
7th Overall Flèche du Sud

1st Stages 1 & 3

8th Overall Le Triptyque des Monts et Châteaux
9th Overall Tour du Haut-Anjou

1st Stage 4

2010
1st Time trial, National Under-23 Road Championships
Tour de Moselle

1st Stages 2 & 4

2nd Overall Mainfranken-Tour
3rd Time trial, UCI Under-23 Road World Championships
3rd Overall Festningsrittet

1st Stage 2

3rd Memorial Davide Fardelli
2011
1st Overall Delta Tour Zeeland

1st Stage 1

1st ProRace Berlin
1st Kampioenschap van Vlaanderen
1st Münsterland Giro
1st Amstel Curaçao Race
Four Days of Dunkirk

1st Points classification
1st Stages 1, 2, 3 & 5

Tour de Pologne

1st Stages 1, 2, 3 & 7

Herald Sun Tour

1st Stages 3 & 5

1st Stage 3 Tour de Langkawi
1st Stage 7 Vuelta a España
2nd Rund um Köln
3rd Trofeo Palma de Mallorca
6th Trofeo Cala Millor
2012
1st Scheldeprijs
1st Omloop van het Houtland
1st Münsterland Giro
Ster ZLM Toer

1st Points classification
1st Stages 1 & 4

Eneco Tour

1st Stages 1 & 4

Tour of Oman

1st Stages 3 & 6

Tour de l'Eurométropole

1st Stages 2 & 3

1st Stage 2 Three Days of De Panne
1st Stage 2 Étoile de Bessèges
2nd Handzame Classic
3rd Grand Prix de Fourmies
7th Grand Prix Impanis-Van Petegem
2013
1st Overall Tour de Picardie

1st Points classification
1st Stages 1 & 3

1st Scheldeprijs
1st Omloop van het Houtland
1st ProRace Berlin
Tour de France

1st Stages 1, 10, 12 & 21
Held after Stage 1
Held after Stages 1 & 2

Tour of Turkey

1st Stages 1, 7 & 8

1st Stage 2 Paris–Nice
1st Stage 1 Tour of Oman
6th Overall Ster ZLM Toer

1st Stage 2

2014
1st Down Under Classic
1st Scheldeprijs
Tour de France

1st Stages 1, 3, 4 & 21
Held & after Stage 1

Giro d'Italia

1st Stages 2 & 3
Held after Stages 2 & 3

Tour of Britain

1st Stages 1 & 8b

1st Stage 1 Ster ZLM Toer
5th Overall Three Days of De Panne
6th Overall Dubai Tour

1st Points classification
1st Stages 2, 3 & 4

6th Vattenfall Cyclassics
2015
1st Down Under Classic
Tour de Pologne

1st Points classification
1st Stage 1

6th Rund um Köln
2016
1st Team time trial, UCI Road World Championships
1st Overall Dubai Tour

1st Points classification
1st Stages 1 & 4

1st Scheldeprijs
1st Grand Prix de Fourmies
Giro d'Italia

1st Stages 2 & 3
Held after Stage 3
Held after Stages 2–6

Volta ao Algarve

1st Points classification
1st Stages 1 & 4

1st Stage 1 Tour de Romandie
1st Stage 3a Three Days of De Panne
1st Stage 4 Tour de France
3rd Road race, National Road Championships
2017
1st Overall Dubai Tour

1st Points classification
1st Stages 1, 2 & 5

1st Scheldeprijs
Tour de France

1st Stages 2, 6, 7, 10 & 11
Held after Stages 2–3 & 7–16

1st Stage 1 Tour of California
1st Stage 2 Abu Dhabi Tour
1st Stage 3a Three Days of De Panne
1st Stage 4 Ster ZLM Toer
4th Münsterland Giro
2018
Tirreno–Adriatico

1st Stages 2 & 6

5th Rund um Köln
2019
1st Trofeo Palma
2nd Clásica de Almería

=== Grand Tour general classification results timeline ===
	2011	2012	2013	2014	2015	2016	2017	2018
Giro d'Italia	—	—	—	DNS-4	—	DNS-9	—	—
Stages won	—	—	—	2	—	2	—	—
Points classification	—	—	—	—	—	—	—	—
Tour de France	—	DNF-5	166	161	—	166	DNF-17	HD-11
Stages won	—	0	4	4	—	1	5	0
Points classification	—	—	4	4	—	2	—	—
Vuelta a España	DNS-13	—	—	—	—	—	—	—
Stages won	1	—	—	—	—	—	—	—
Points classification	—	—	—	—	—	—	—	—

Legend
1	Winner
2–3	Top three-finish
4–10	Top ten-finish
11–	Other finish
DNE	Did not enter
DNF-x	Did not finish (retired on stage x)
DNS-x	Did not start (not started on stage x)
HD-x	Finished outside time limit (occurred on stage x)
DSQ	Disqualified
N/A	Race/classification not held
NR	Not ranked in this classification
