= 2016 UCI Europe Tour =

Road bicycle race series

- Twelfth edition of the UCI Europe Tour

Details
- Dates: 28 January 2016 – 23 October 2016
- Location: Europe
- Races: 283

Champions
- Individual champion: Baptiste Planckaert (BEL) (Wallonie-Bruxelles–Group Protect)
- Teams' champion: Wanty–Groupe Gobert
- Nations' champion: Belgium

The 2016 UCI Europe Tour was the twelfth season of the UCI Europe Tour. The 2016 season began on 28 January 2016 with the Trofeo Santanyí-Ses Salines-Campos and ended on 23 October 2016 with the Chrono des Nations.

French rider Nacer Bouhanni (Cofidis), who scored 721 points in the 2015 edition, was the defending champion of the 2015 UCI Europe Tour.

Throughout the season, points were awarded to the top finishers of stages within stage races and the final general classification standings of each of the stages races and one-day events. The quality and complexity of a race also determined how many points were awarded to the top finishers; the higher the UCI rating of a race, the more points were awarded.

The UCI ratings from highest to lowest were as follows:

- Multi-day events: 2.HC, 2.1 and 2.2
- One-day events: 1.HC, 1.1 and 1.2

== Events ==
=== January ===
Date	Race name	Location	UCI Rating	Winner	Team	Ref
28 Jan.	Felanitx-Ses Salines-Campos-Porreres	Spain	1.1	André Greipel (GER)	Lotto–Soudal	
29 Jan.	Trofeo Pollença-Andratx	Spain	1.1	Gianluca Brambilla (ITA)	Etixx–Quick-Step	
30 Jan.	Trofeo Serra de Tramuntana	Spain	1.1	Fabian Cancellara (SUI)	Trek–Segafredo	
31 Jan.	Trofeo Playa de Palma-Palma	Spain	1.1	André Greipel (GER)	Lotto–Soudal	
31 Jan.	GP Cycliste la Marseillaise	France	1.1	Dries Devenyns (BEL)	IAM Cycling	

=== February ===
Date	Race name	Location	UCI Rating	Winner	Team	Ref
3–7 Feb.	Étoile de Bessèges	France	2.1	Jérôme Coppel (FRA)	IAM Cycling	
3–7 Feb.	Volta a la Comunitat Valenciana	Spain	2.1	Wout Poels (NED)	Team Sky	
7 Feb.	GP Costa degli Etruschi	Italy	1.1	Grega Bole (SLO)	Nippo–Vini Fantini	
11–14 Feb.	La Méditerranéenne	France	2.1	Andriy Grivko (UKR)	Astana	
13 Feb.	Vuelta a Murcia	Spain	1.1	Philippe Gilbert (BEL)	BMC Racing Team	
14 Feb.	Clásica de Almería	Spain	1.1	Leigh Howard (AUS)	IAM Cycling	
14 Feb.	GP Laguna	Croatia	1.2	Filippo Ganna (ITA)	Team Colpack	
14 Feb.	Trofeo Laigueglia	Italy	1.HC	Andrea Fedi (ITA)	Southeast–Venezuela	
17–21 Feb.	Vuelta an Andalucía	Spain	2.1	Alejandro Valverde (ESP)	Movistar Team	
17–21 Feb.	Volta ao Algarve	Portugal	2.1	Geraint Thomas (GBR)	Team Sky	
20–21 Feb.	Tour du Haut Var	France	2.1	Arthur Vichot (FRA)	FDJ	
23–25 Feb.	Tour La Provence	France	2.1	Thomas Voeckler (FRA)	Direct Énergie	
27 Feb.	Omloop Het Nieuwsblad	Belgium	1.HC	Greg Van Avermaet (BEL)	BMC Racing Team	
27 Feb.	Classic Sud-Ardèche	France	1.1	Petr Vakoč (CZE)	Etixx–Quick-Step	
28 Feb.	La Drôme Classic	France	1.1	Petr Vakoč (CZE)	Etixx–Quick-Step	
28 Feb.	GP Izola	Slovenia	1.2	Jure Golčer (SLO)	Adria Mobil	
28 Feb.	Kuurne–Brussels–Kuurne	Belgium	1.HC	Jasper Stuyven (BEL)	Trek–Segafredo	
28 Feb.	Gran Premio di Lugano	Switzerland	1.HC	Sonny Colbrelli (ITA)	Bardiani–CSF	

=== March ===
Date	Race name	Location	UCI Rating	Winner	Team	Ref
2 Mar.	Le Samyn	Belgium	1.1	Niki Terpstra (NED)	Etixx–Quick-Step	
2 Mar.	Trofej Umag	Croatia	1.2	Jonas Bokeloh (GER)	Klein Constantia	
4–6 Mar.	Driedaagse van West-Vlaanderen	Belgium	2.1	Sean De Bie (BEL)	Lotto–Soudal	
5 Mar.	Ster van Zwolle	Netherlands	1.2	Jeff Vermeulen (NED)	Cyclingteam Jo Piels	
5 Mar.	Strade Bianche	Italy	1.HC	Fabian Cancellara (SUI)	Trek–Segafredo	
5 Mar.	Poreč Trophy	Croatia	1.2	Matej Mugerli (SLO)	Synergy Baku	
6 Mar.	GP Industria & Artigianato di Larciano	Italy	1.1	Simon Clarke (AUS)	Cannondale	
6 Mar.	Grand Prix de la Ville de Lillers	France	1.2	Stijn Steels (BEL)	Topsport Vlaanderen–Baloise	
10–13 Mar.	Istrian Spring Trophy	Croatia	2.2	Olivier Pardini (BEL)	Wallonie-Bruxelles–Group Protect	
12 Mar.	Ronde van Drenthe	Netherlands	1.1	Jesper Asselman (NED)	Roompot–Oranje Peloton	
12–13 Mar.	8. GP Liberty Seguros – Troféu Alpendre	Portugal	2.2	August Jensen (NOR)	Team Coop–Øster Hus	
13 Mar.	Dorpenomloop Rucphen	Netherlands	1.2	Aidis Kruopis (LTU)	Verandas Willems	
13 Mar.	Paris–Troyes	France	1.2	Rudy Barbier (FRA)	Roubaix–Métropole Européenne de Lille	
16–20 Mar.	Volta ao Alentejo	Portugal	2.2	Enric Mas (ESP)	Klein Constantia	
16 Mar.	Nokere Koerse	Belgium	1.HC	Timothy Dupont (BEL)	Verandas Willems	
18 Mar.	Handzame Classic	Belgium	1.1	Erik Baška (SVK)	Tinkoff	
19 Mar.	Classic Loire Atlantique	France	1.1	Anthony Turgis (FRA)	Cofidis	
20 Mar.	Cholet-Pays de Loire	France	1.1	Rudy Barbier (FRA)	Roubaix–Métropole Européenne de Lille	
21–27 Mar.	Tour de Normandie	France	2.2	Baptiste Planckaert (BEL)	Wallonie-Bruxelles–Group Protect	
23 Mar.	Dwars door Vlaanderen	Belgium	1.HC	Jens Debusschere (BEL)	Lotto–Soudal	
24–27 Mar.	Settimana Internazionale di Coppi e Bartali	Italy	2.1	Sergey Firsanov (RUS)	Gazprom–RusVelo	
26–27 Mar.	Critérium International	France	2.HC	Thibaut Pinot (FRA)	FDJ	
27 Mar.	Kattekoers	Belgium	1.Ncup	Mads Pedersen (DEN)	Stölting Service Group	
28 Mar.	Giro del Belvedere	Italy	1.2U	Patrick Müller (SWI)	BMC Development Team	
29 Mar.	G.P. Palio del Recioto	Italy	1.2U	Ruben Guerreiro (POR)	Axeon–Hagens Berman	
29–31 Mar.	Three Days of De Panne	Belgium	2.HC	Lieuwe Westra (NED)	Astana	

=== April ===
Date	Race name	Location	UCI Rating	Winner	Team	Ref
1 April	Route Adélie	France	1.1	Bryan Coquard (FRA)	Direct Énergie	
1–3 April	Triptyque des Monts et Châteaux	Belgium	2.2	Mads Würtz (DEN)	Team TreFor	
2 April	GP Miguel Induráin	Spain	1.1	Jon Izagirre (ESP)	Movistar Team	
2 April	Volta Limburg Classic	Netherlands	1.1	Floris Gerts (NED)	BMC Racing Team	
3 April	Vuelta a La Rioja	Spain	1.1	Michael Matthews (AUS)	Orica–GreenEDGE	
3 April	GP Adria Mobil	Slovenia	1.2	Filippo Fortin (ITA)	GM Europa Ovini	
3 April	Trofeo PIVA	Italy	1.2U	Tao Geoghegan Hart (GBR)	Axeon–Hagens Berman	
3 April	Paris–Camembert	France	1.1	Cyril Gautier (FRA)	AG2R La Mondiale	
5–8 April	Circuit de la Sarthe	France	2.1	Marc Fournier (FRA)	FDJ	
6 April	Scheldeprijs	Belgium	1.HC	Marcel Kittel (GER)	Etixx–Quick-Step	
8–10 April	Circuit des Ardennes	France	2.2	Olivier Pardini (BEL)	Wallonie-Bruxelles–Group Protect	
9 April	Ronde van Vlaanderen U23	Belgium	1.Ncup	David Per (SLO)	Adria Mobil	
10 April	Klasika Primavera	Spain	1.1	Giovanni Visconti (ITA)	Movistar Team	
13–17 April	Tour du Loir-et-Cher	France	2.2	Patrick Schelling (SUI)	Team Vorarlberg	
13 April	Brabantse Pijl	Belgium	1.HC	Petr Vakoč (CZE)	Etixx–Quick-Step	
14–17 April	Tour of Mersin	Turkey	2.2	Nazim Bakırcı (TUR)	Torku Şekerspor	
14 April	Grand Prix de Denain	France	1.HC	Dan McLay (GBR)	Fortuneo–Vital Concept	
15–17 April	Vuelta a Castilla y León	Spain	2.1	Alejandro Valverde (ESP)	Movistar Team	
15–16 April	ZLM Tour	Netherlands	2.Ncup	Amund Grøndahl (NOR)	Norway national team	
16 April	Liège–Bastogne–Liège Espoirs	Belgium	1.2U	Logan Owen (USA)	Axeon–Hagens Berman	
16 April	Tour du Finistère	France	1.1	Baptiste Planckaert (BEL)	Wallonie-Bruxelles–Group Protect	
16 April	Trofeo Edil C	Italy	1.2	Vincenzo Albanese (ITA)	Hopplà-Petroli Firenze	
17 April	Giro dell'Appennino	Italy	1.1	Sergey Firsanov (RUS)	Gazprom–RusVelo	
17 April	Ronde van Noord-Holland	Netherlands	1.2	Mathias Westergaard (DEN)	Team Almeborg–Bornholm	
17 April	Tro-Bro Léon	France	1.1	Martin Mortensen (DEN)	ONE Pro Cycling	
19–24 April	Tour of Croatia	Croatia	2.1	Matija Kvasina (CRO)	Synergy Baku	
19–22 April	Giro del Trentino	Italy	2.HC	Mikel Landa (ESP)	Team Sky	
23 April	Arno Wallaard Memorial	Netherlands	1.2	Maarten van Trijp (NED)	Metec–TKH	
23 April	Belgrade Banjaluka I	Serbia	1.2	Vitaliy Buts (UKR)	Kolss BDC Team	
23 April	Kerékpárverseny	Hungary	1.2	Marek Čanecký (SVK)	Amplatz–BMC	
24 April–1 May	Presidential Tour of Turkey	Turkey	2.HC	José Gonçalves (POR)	Caja Rural–Seguros RGA	
24 April	Belgrade Banjaluka II	Bosnia and Herzegovina	1.2	Filippo Fortin (ITA)	GM Europa Ovini	
24 April	GP Slovakia	Slovakia	1.2	Andriy Kulyk (UKR)	Kolss BDC Team	
24 April	La Roue Tourangelle	France	1.1	Samuel Dumoulin (FRA)	AG2R La Mondiale	
24 April	Paris–Mantes-en-Yvelines	France	1.2	Paul Ourselin (FRA)	Vendée U Pays de la Loire	
24 April	Rutland-Melton Classic	United Kingdom	1.2	Conor Dunne (IRE)	JLT–Condor	
25 April–1 May	Tour de Bretagne Cycliste	France	2.2	Adrien Costa (USA)	Axeon–Hagens Berman	
25 April	Gran Premio della Liberazione	Italy	1.2U	Vincenzo Albanese (ITA)	Hopplà-Petroli Firenze	
28 April–3 May	Carpathian Couriers Race	Poland	2.2U	Hamish Schreurs (NZL)	Klein Constantia	
29 April–1 May	Tour de Yorkshire	United Kingdom	2.1	Thomas Voeckler (FRA)	Direct Énergie	
29 April	Himmerland Rundt	Denmark	1.2	Jonas Gregaard Wilsly (DEN)	Riwal Platform	
30 April–2 May	Vuelta a Asturias	Spain	2.1	Hugh Carthy (GBR)	Caja Rural–Seguros RGA	
30 April	GP Viborg	Denmark	1.2	Johim Ariesen (NED)	Metec–TKH	
30 April	ZODC Zuidenveld Tour	Netherlands	1.2	Elmar Reinders (NED)	Cyclingteam Jo Piels	

=== May ===
Date	Race name	Location	UCI Rating	Winner	Team	Ref
1 May	Circuito del Porto	Italy	1.2	Marco Maronese (ITA)	Zalf-Euromobil-Désirée-Fior	
1 May	Memoriał Andrzeja Trochanowskiego	Poland	1.2	Alois Kaňkovský (CZE)	Whirlpool–Author	
1 May	Rund um den Finanzplatz Eschborn–Frankfurt	Germany	1.HC	Alexander Kristoff (NOR)	Team Katusha	
1 May	Rund um den Finanzplatz Eschborn–Frankfurt U23	Germany	1.2U	Konrad Geßner (GER)	P&S Team Thüringen	
1 May	Skive-Løbet	Denmark	1.2	Johim Ariesen (NED)	Metec–TKH	
2 May	Memoriał Romana Siemińskiego	Poland	1.2	Mykhaylo Kononenko (UKR)	Kolss BDC Team	
4–8 May	Flèche du Sud	Luxembourg	2.2	Sérgio Sousa (POR)	Team Vorarlberg	
4–8 May	Tour d'Azerbaïdjan	Azerbaijan	2.1	Markus Eibegger (AUT)	Team Felbermayr–Simplon Wels	
4–8 May	4 Jours de Dunkerque	France	2.HC	Bryan Coquard (FRA)	Direct Énergie	
5 May	Dwars door de Vlaamse Ardennen	Belgium	1.2	Timothy Dupont (BEL)	Verandas Willems	
6–8 May	CCC Tour Grody Piastowskie	Poland	2.2	Oleksandr Polivoda (UKR)	Kolss BDC Team	
7–8 May	Vuelta a la Comunidad de Madrid	Spain	2.1	Juan José Lobato (ESP)	Movistar Team	
7 May	Sundvolden GP	Norway	1.2	Andreas Vangstad (NOR)	Team Sparebanken Sør	
8 May	Flèche Ardennaise	Belgium	1.2	Jeroen Meijers (NED)	Rabobank Development Team	
8 May	Ringerike GP	Norway	1.2	Trond Trondsen (NOR)	Team Sparebanken Sør	
8 May	Trofeo Città di San Vendemiano	Italy	1.2U	Simone Consonni (ITA)	Team Colpack	
12–15 May	Rhône-Alpes Isère Tour	France	2.2	Lennard Hofstede (NED)	Rabobank Development Team	
13–16 May	Tour de Berlin	Germany	2.2U	Rémi Cavagna (FRA)	Klein Constantia	
13–15 May	Tour de Picardie	France	2.1	Nacer Bouhanni (FRA)	Cofidis	
13–15 May	Volta Internacional Cova da Beira	Portugal	2.1	Joni Brandão (POR)	Efapel	
14 May	GP Polski	Poland	1.2	Łukasz Owsian (POL)	CCC–Sprandi–Polkowice	
14 May	Ronde van Overijssel	Netherlands	1.2	Aidis Kruopis (LIT)	Verandas Willems	
14 May	Scandinavian Race Uppsala	Sweden	1.2	Syver Wærsted (NOR)	Team Ringeriks–Kraft	
15 May	GP Czech Republic	Czech Republic	1.2	Marek Rutkiewicz (POL)	Wibatech–Fuji	
15 May	GP Industrie del Marmo	Italy	1.2	Damiano Cima (ITA)	Viris Maserati Sisal Chiaravalli	
15 May	GP Criquielion	Belgium	1.2	Timothy Dupont (BEL)	Verandas Willems	
18–22 May	Bałtyk–Karkonosze Tour	Poland	2.2	Mateusz Taciak (POL)	CCC–Sprandi–Polkowice	
18–22 May	Tour of Norway	Norway	2.HC	Pieter Weening (NED)	Roompot–Oranje Peloton	
19–22 May	Ronde de l'Isard	France	2.2U	Bjorg Lambrecht (BEL)	Lotto–Soudal U23	
19–22 May	Tour of Bihor	Romania	2.2	Egan Bernal (COL)	Androni Giocattoli–Sidermec	
20–22 May	Paris–Arras Tour	France	2.2	Aidis Kruopis (LIT)	Verandas Willems	
21 May	Tour de Berne	Switzerland	1.2	Enrico Salvador (ITA)	Unieuro–Wilier	
22–29 May	An Post Rás	Ireland	2.2	Clemens Fankhauser (AUT)	Tirol Cycling Team	
22 May	Velothon Wales	United Kingdom	1.1	Thomas Stewart (GBR)	Madison Genesis	
22 May	GP de la Somme	France	1.1	Dan McLay (GBR)	Fortuneo–Vital Concept	
22 May	Omloop der Kempen	Netherlands	1.2	Oscar Riesebeek (NED)	Metec–TKH	
25–29 May	Tour of Belgium	Belgium	2.HC	Dries Devenyns (BEL)	IAM Cycling	
27–29 May	Tour de Gironde	France	2.2	Amund Grøndahl (NOR)	Team Joker	
27–28 May	Tour of Estonia	Estonia	2.1	Grzegorz Stępniak (POL)	CCC–Sprandi–Polkowice	
27 May	Race Horizon Park for Peace	Ukraine	1.2	Vitaliy Buts (UKR)	Kolss BDC Team	
28 May	GP de Plumelec-Morbihan	France	1.1	Samuel Dumoulin (FRA)	AG2R La Mondiale	
29 May	Boucles de l'Aulne	France	1.1	Samuel Dumoulin (FRA)	AG2R La Mondiale	
29 May	Paris–Roubaix Espoirs	France	1.2U	Filippo Ganna (ITA)		
29 May	Race Horizon Park Classic	Ukraine	1.2	Mykhaylo Kononenko (UKR)	Kolss BDC Team	
31 May–2 June	Tour of Ukraine	Ukraine	2.2	Sergiy Lagkuti (UKR)	Kolss BDC Team	

=== June ===
Date	Race name	Location	UCI Rating	Winner	Team	Ref
1–5 June	Tour de Luxembourg	Luxembourg	2.HC	Maurits Lammertink (NED)	Roompot–Oranje Peloton	
2–5 June	Boucles de la Mayenne	France	2.1	Bryan Coquard (FRA)	Direct Énergie	
3–5 June	Course de la Paix U-23	Czech Republic	2.Ncup	David Gaudu (FRA)	France (national team)	
4 June	GP of Vinnytsia	Ukraine	1.2	Siarhei Papok (BLR)	Minsk Cycling Club	
4 June	Heistse Pijl	Belgium	1.1	Dylan Groenewegen (NED)	LottoNL–Jumbo	
4 June	Hets Hatsafon	Israel	1.2	Guy Gabay (ISR)	Cycling Academy	
5 June	GP of ISD	Ukraine	1.2	Nurbolat Kulimbetov (KAZ)	Astana City	
5 June	Memorial Van Coningsloo	Belgium	1.2	Timothy Dupont (BEL)	Verandas Willems	
7–12 June	Tour de Slovaquie	Slovakia	2.2	Mauro Finetto (ITA)	Unieuro–Wilier	
9–12 June	Ronde de l'Oise	France	2.2	Antonio Parrinello (ITA)	D'Amico–Bottecchia	
9 June	GP du Canton d'Argovie	Switzerland	1.HC	Giacomo Nizzolo (ITA)	Trek–Segafredo	
10–12 June	Tour of Małopolska	Poland	2.2	Mateusz Taciak (POL)	CCC–Sprandi–Polkowice	
11 June	Fyen Rundt	Denmark	1.2	Mads Pedersen (DEN)	Stölting Service Group	
12 June	GP Horsens Posten	Denmark	1.2	Alexander Kamp (DEN)	Stölting Service Group	
12 June	Ronde van Limburg	Belgium	1.1	Kenny Dehaes (BEL)	Wanty–Groupe Gobert	
12 June	Rund um Köln	Germany	1.1	Dylan Groenewegen (NED)	LottoNL–Jumbo	
14–19 June	Tour de Serbie	Serbia	2.2	Matej Mugerli (SVN)	Synergy Baku	
15–19 June	Ster ZLM Toer GP Jan van Heeswijk	Netherlands	2.1	Sep Vanmarcke (BEL)	LottoNL–Jumbo	
16–19 June	Route du Sud	France	2.1	Nairo Quintana (COL)	Movistar Team	
16–19 June	Tour of Slovenia	Slovenia	2.1	Rein Taaramäe (EST)	Team Katusha	
16–19 June	Tour des Pays de Savoie	France	2.2	Enric Mas (ESP)	Klein Constantia	
16–19 June	Oberösterreichrundfahrt	Austria	2.2	Stephan Rabitsch (AUT)	Team Felbermayr–Simplon Wels	
18 June	Memorial Grundmanna I Wizowskiego	Poland	1.2	Vojtěch Hačecký (CZE)	Whirlpool–Author	
19 June	Korona Kocich Gór	Poland	1.2	Mateusz Komar (POL)	Domin Sport	
19 June	Beaumont Trophy	United Kingdom	1.2	Dion Smith (NZL)	ONE Pro Cycling	
19 June	Circuit de Wallonie	Belgium	1.2	Kévin Lalouette (FRA)	EC Raismes Petite-Forêt	
22 June	Halle–Ingooigem	Belgium	1.1	Dries De Bondt (BEL)	Verandas Willems	
28 June–3 July	Tour de Hongrie	Hungary	2.2	Mihkel Räim (EST)	Cycling Academy	
29 June–2 July	Solidarnosc et des Champions Olympiques	Poland	2.2	Yauhen Sobal (BLR)	Minsk Cycling Club	
29 June	I.W.T. Jong Maar Moedig	Belgium	1.2	Jérôme Baugnies (BEL)	Wanty–Groupe Gobert	

=== July ===
Date	Race name	Location	UCI Rating	Winner	Team	Ref
2 July	Omloop Het Nieuwsblad U23	Belgium	1.2	Elias Van Breussegem (BEL)	Verandas Willems	
2–9 July	Österreich Rundfahrt	Austria	2.1	Jan Hirt (CZE)	CCC–Sprandi–Polkowice	
3 July	Balkan Elite Road Classics	Albania	1.2	Eugert Zhupa (ALB)	Albania (national team)	
3 July	Paris–Chauny	France	1.2	Dieter Bouvry (BEL)	Roubaix–Métropole Européenne de Lille	
6–10 July	Sibiu Cycling Tour	Romania	2.1	Nikolay Mihaylov (BUL)	CCC–Sprandi–Polkowice	
7–10 July	Troféu Joaquim Agostinho	Portugal	2.2	Rinaldo Nocentini (ITA)	Sporting / Tavira	
8 July	Minsk Cup	Belarus	1.2	Alexandr Kulikovskiy (RUS)	Russia (national team)	
9 July	Grand Prix Minsk	Belarus	1.2	Siarhei Papok (BLR)	Minsk Cycling Club	
9 July	Grote Prijs Stad Sint-Niklaas	Belgium	1.2	Justin Jules (FRA)	Veranclassic–Ago	
10 July	Giro del Medio Brenta	Italy	1.2	Fausto Masnada (ITA)	Team Colpack	
12–17 July	Giro della Valle d'Aosta	Italy	2.2U	Kilian Frankiny (SWI)	BMC Development Team	
14–17 July	Volta a Portugal do Futuro	Portugal	2.2U	Wilson Enrique Rodriguez (COL)	Boyacá Raza de Campeones	
17 July	Trofeo Matteotti	Italy	1.1	Vincenzo Albanese (ITA)	Italian national team	
20 July	Grand Prix Pino Cerami	Belgium	1.1	Jelle Wallays (BEL)	Lotto–Soudal	
23–27 July	Tour de Wallonie	Belgium	2.HC	Dries Devenyns (BEL)	IAM Cycling	
24 July	GP Ville de Pérenchies	France	1.2	Timothy Dupont (BEL)	Verandas Willems	
25 July	Prueba Villafranca de Ordizia	Spain	1.1	Simon Yates (GBR)	Orica–BikeExchange	
27–30 July	Dookoła Mazowsza	Poland	2.2	Matti Manninen (FIN)	Team Bliz–Merida	
27–31 July	Tour Alsace	France	2.2	Maximilian Schachmann (GER)	Klein Constantia	
27–31 July	Danmark Rundt	Denmark	2.HC	Michael Valgren (DEN)	Tinkoff	
27 Jul –7 Aug	Volta a Portugal	Portugal	2.1	Rui Vinhas (POR)	W52 / FC Porto / Porto Canal	
30 Jul–1 Aug	Kreiz Breizh Elites	France	2.2	Jeroen Meijers (NED)	Rabobank Development Team	
31 July	Trofeo Almar	Italy	1.Ncup	Alexandr Kulikovskiy (RUS)		
31 July	London–Surrey Classic	United Kingdom	1.HC	Tom Boonen (BEL)	Etixx–Quick-Step	
31 July	GP Kranj	Slovenia	1.2	Mattia De Marchi (ITA)		
31 July	Circuito de Getxo	Spain	1.1	Diego Ulissi (ITA)	Lampre–Merida	
31 July	Polynormande	France	1.1	Baptiste Planckaert (BEL)	Wallonie-Bruxelles–Group Protect	
31 July	Rudi Altig Race	Germany	1.1	Paul Voss (GER)|	Bora–Argon 18	

=== August ===
Date	Race name	Location	UCI Rating	Winner	Team	Ref
2–6 August	Vuelta a Burgos	Spain	2.HC	Alberto Contador (ESP)	Tinkoff	
5 August	Dwars door het Hageland	Belgium	1.1	Niki Terpstra (NED)	Etixx–Quick-Step	
6 August	Tour de Ribas	Ukraine	1.2	Andriy Vasylyuk (UKR)	Kolss BDC Team	
7 August	Antwerpse Havenpijl	Belgium	1.2	Timothy Dupont (BEL)	Verandas Willems	
7 August	Odessa Grand Prix	Ukraine	1.2	Oleksandr Prevar (UKR)	Kolss BDC Team	
10–13 August	Tour de l'Ain	France	2.1	Sam Oomen (NED)	Team Giant–Alpecin	
11–13 August	Tour of Szeklerland	Romania	2.2	Kirill Pozdnyakov (RUS)	Synergy Baku	
11–14 August	Czech Cycling Tour	Czech Republic	2.1	Diego Ulissi (ITA)	Lampre–Merida	
11–14 August	Arctic Race of Norway	Norway	2.HC	Gianni Moscon (ITA)	Team Sky	
13 August	Memoriał Henryka Łasaka	Poland	1.2	Paweł Franczak (POL)	Verva ActiveJet	
14 August	Coupe des Carpathes	Poland	1.2	Antonio Parrinello (ITA)	D'Amico–Bottecchia	
14 August	Slag om Norg	Netherlands	1.2	Fabio Jakobsen (NED)	SEG Racing Academy	
14 August	Gran Premio Sportivi di Poggiana	Italy	1.2	Michael Storer (AUS)	Australia national team	
15-18 August	Tour of Ankara	Turkey	2.2	Serkan Balkan (TUR)	Brisaspor	
16–19 August	Tour du Limousin	France	2.1	Joey Rosskopf (USA)	BMC Racing Team	
16 August	GP Capodarco	Italy	1.2U	Jai Hindley (AUS)	Attaque Team Gusto	
17 August	Coppa Citta di Offida	Italy	1.2U	Enrico Salvador (ITA)	Unieuro–Wilier	
19 August	Arnhem–Veenendaal Classic	Netherlands	1.1	Dylan Groenewegen (NED)	LottoNL–Jumbo	
20 August	Puchar Ministra Obrony Narodowej	Poland	1.2	Alois Kaňkovský (CZE)	Whirlpool–Author	
20–27 August	Tour de l'Avenir	France	2.Ncup	David Gaudu (FRA)	France (national team)	
21 August	Grote Prijs Jef Scherens	Belgium	1.1	Dimitri Claeys (BEL)	Wanty–Groupe Gobert	
23 August	Grote Prijs Stad Zottegem	Belgium	1.1	Tim Merlier (BEL)	Crelan–Vastgoedservice	
23 August	Grand Prix des Marbriers	France	1.2	Emiel Planckaert (BEL)	Lotto–Soudal U23	
23–26 August	Tour du Poitou Charentes	France	2.1	Sylvain Chavanel (FRA)	Direct Énergie	
24 August	Druivenkoers Overijse	Belgium	1.1	Jérôme Baugnies (BEL)	Wanty–Groupe Gobert	
26–28 August	Baltic Chain Tour	Estonia	2.2	Maris Bogdanovics (LAT)	Rietumu–Delfin	
27 August	Omloop Mandel-Leie-Schelde Meulebeke	Belgium	1.2	Pieter Vanspeybrouck (BEL)	Topsport Vlaanderen–Baloise	
27–28 August	Ronde van Midden-Nederland	Netherlands	2.2	Chris Opie (GBR)	ONE Pro Cycling	
28 August	Croatia–Slovenia	Slovenia	1.2	Jannik Steimle (AUT)	Team Felbermayr–Simplon Wels	
28 August	Schaal Sels	Belgium	1.1	Wout van Aert (BEL)	Crelan–Vastgoedservice	
28 Aug–2 Sep	Tour of Bulgaria	Bulgaria	2.2	Marco Tecchio (ITA)	Unieuro–Wilier	
31 Aug–4 Sep	Tour des Fjords	Norway	2.1	Alexander Kristoff (NOR)	Team Katusha	

=== September ===
Date	Race name	Location	UCI Rating	Winner	Team	Ref
3 September	Brussels Cycling Classic	Belgium	1.HC	Tom Boonen (BEL)	Etixx–Quick-Step	
4 September	Grand Prix de Fourmies	France	1.HC	Marcel Kittel (GER)	Etixx–Quick-Step	
4 September	Kernen Omloop Echt-Susteren	Netherlands	1.2	Daan Meijers (NED)	Cyclingteam Join-S–De Rijke	
4–11 September	Tour of Britain	United Kingdom	2.HC	Steve Cummings (GBR)	Team Dimension Data	
9–10 September	East Bohemia Tour	Czech Republic	2.2	Jan Tratnik (SLO)	Amplatz–BMC	
10 September	De Kustpijl	Belgium	1.2	Timothy Dupont (BEL)	Verandas Willems	
11 September	Tour du Doubs	France	1.1	Samuel Dumoulin (FRA)	AG2R La Mondiale	
11 September	Chrono Champenois	France	1.2	Daniel Westmattelmann (GER)	Team Kuota–Lotto	
12 September	Grote Prijs Marcel Kint	Belgium	1.2	Jan-Willem Van Schip (NED)	Cyclingteam Join-S–De Rijke	
14 September	Coppa Bernocchi	Italy	1.1	Giacomo Nizzolo (ITA)	Italy (national team)	
14 September	Grand Prix de Wallonie	Belgium	1.1	Tony Gallopin (FRA)	Lotto–Soudal	
14 September	European Road Championships – U23 Time Trial	France	CC	Lennard Kämna (GER)	Germany (national team)	
15 September	Coppa Ugo Agostoni	Italy	1.1	Sonny Colbrelli (ITA)	Bardiani–CSF	
15 September	European Road Championships – Time Trial	France	CC	Jonathan Castroviejo (ESP)	Spain (national team)	
16 September	Kampioenschap van Vlaanderen	Belgium	1.1	Timothy Dupont (BEL)	Verandas Willems	
17 September	Primus Classic Impanis–Van Petegem	Belgium	1.HC	Fernando Gaviria (COL)	Etixx–Quick-Step	
17 September	Memorial Marco Pantani	Italy	1.1	Francesco Gavazzi (ITA)	Androni Giocattoli–Sidermec	
17 September	European Road Championships – U23 Road Race	France	CC	Alexandr Riabushenko (BLR)	Belarus (national team)	
18 September	European Road Championships – Road Race	France	CC	Peter Sagan (SVK)	Slovakia (national team)	
18 September	Grand Prix d'Isbergues	France	1.1	Kristoffer Halvorsen (NOR)	Team Joker Byggtorget	
20–21 September	Giro della Toscana	Italy	2.1	Daniele Bennati (ITA)	Tinkoff	
22 September	Coppa Sabatini	Italy	1.1	Sonny Colbrelli (ITA)	Bardiani–CSF	
24 September	Giro dell'Emilia	Italy	1.HC	Esteban Chaves (COL)	Orica–BikeExchange	
25 September	Gran Premio Bruno Beghelli	Italy	1.HC	Nicola Ruffoni (ITA)	Bardiani–CSF	
25 September	Duo Normand	France	1.1	Luke Durbridge (AUS); Svein Tuft (CAN)	Orica–BikeExchange	
25 September	Gooikse Pijl	Belgium	1.2	Aidis Kruopis (LTU)	Verandas Willems	
27 September	Tre Valli Varesine	Italy	1.HC	Sonny Colbrelli (ITA)	Bardiani–CSF	
27 September	Ruota d'Oro	Italy	1.2U	Vincenzo Albanese (ITA)		
27 Sep–2 Oct	Olympia's Tour	Netherlands	2.2U	Cees Bol (NED)		
28 September	Milano–Torino	Italy	1.HC	Miguel Ángel López (COL)	Astana	
29 September	Giro del Piemonte	Italy	1.HC	Giacomo Nizzolo (ITA)	Italy (national team)	

=== October ===
Date	Race name	Location	UCI Rating	Winner	Team	Ref
2 October	Tour de Vendée	France	1.1	Nacer Bouhanni (FRA)	Cofidis	
2 October	Tour de l'Eurométropole	Belgium	1.HC	Dylan Groenewegen (NED)	LottoNL–Jumbo	
2 October	Piccolo Giro di Lombardia	Italy	1.2U	Harm Vanhoucke (BEL)		
3 October	Sparkassen Münsterland Giro	Germany	1.HC	John Degenkolb (GER)	Team Giant–Alpecin	
4 October	Binche-Chimay-Binche	Belgium	1.1	Arnaud Démare (FRA)	FDJ	
8 October	Paris–Bourges	France	1.1	Sam Bennett (IRE)	Bora–Argon 18	
9 October	Paris–Tours	France	1.HC	Fernando Gaviria (COL)	Etixx–Quick-Step	
9 October	Paris–Tours Espoirs	France	1.2U	Arvid De Kleijn (NED)	Cyclingteam Jo Piels	
11 October	Nationale Sluitingsprijs	Belgium	1.1	Roy Jans (BEL)	Wanty–Groupe Gobert	
23 October	Chrono des Nations	France	1.1	Vasil Kiryienka (BLR)	Team Sky	

== Final standings ==
=== Individual classification ===
Rank	Name	Team	Points
1	Baptiste Planckaert (BEL)	Wallonie-Bruxelles–Group Protect	1605
2	Timothy Dupont (BEL)	Verandas Willems	1425
3	Sonny Colbrelli (ITA)	Bardiani–CSF	1370
4	Bryan Coquard (FRA)	Direct Énergie	1333
5	Dylan Groenewegen (NED)	LottoNL–Jumbo	1145
6	Samuel Dumoulin (FRA)	AG2R La Mondiale	1145
7	Diego Ulissi (ITA)	Lampre–Merida	1126
8	Nacer Bouhanni (FRA)	Cofidis	1035
9	Francesco Gavazzi (ITA)	Androni Giocattoli–Sidermec	954
10	Petr Vakoč (CZE)	Etixx–Quick-Step	910

=== Teams classification ===
Rank	Team	Points
1	Wanty–Groupe Gobert	3015
2	Direct Énergie	2966
3	Cofidis	2953
4	Caja Rural–Seguros RGA	2683
5	Wallonie-Bruxelles–Group Protect	2469
6	Bardiani–CSF	2244
7	Verandas Willems	2201
8	Androni Giocattoli–Sidermec	2109
9	Topsport Vlaanderen–Baloise	2038
10	Bora–Argon 18	1930

=== Nations classification ===
Rank	Nation	Points
1	Belgium	8044
2	Italy	6943.75
3	France	6786
4	Norway	3871
5	Spain	3759
6	Netherlands	3738
7	United Kingdom	3718
8	Germany	3410
9	Denmark	2685.5
10	Czech Republic	2231

=== Nations under-23 classification ===
Rank	Nation	Points
1	Italy	1746
2	France	1576
3	Belgium	1438.25
4	United Kingdom	1247
5	Norway	1152
6	Germany	1145.5
7	Denmark	991
8	Netherlands	970
9	Slovenia	534
10	Russia	476.92
