= 2016 BMC Racing Team season =

BMC Racing Team
- 2016 season
- UCI code: BMC
- Status: UCI ProTeam
- Manager: Jim Ochowicz
- Main sponsor(s): BMC Switzerland
- Based: United States
- Bicycles: BMC
- Groupset: Shimano

Season victories
- One-day races: 4
- Stage race overall: 2
- Stage race stages: 17
- National Championships: 4

The 2016 season for the BMC Racing Team began in January with the Tour Down Under. As a UCI WorldTeam, they were automatically invited and obligated to send a squad to every event in the UCI World Tour.

== Team roster ==
As of 29 March 2016

Rider	Date of birth
Darwin Atapuma (COL)	January 15, 1988 (aged 28)
Tom Bohli (SUI)	January 17, 1994 (aged 22)
Brent Bookwalter (USA)	February 16, 1984 (aged 32)
Marcus Burghardt (GER)	June 30, 1983 (aged 32)
Damiano Caruso (ITA)	August 12, 1987 (aged 28)
Alessandro De Marchi (ITA)	May 19, 1986 (aged 29)
Rohan Dennis (AUS)	May 28, 1990 (aged 25)
Silvan Dillier (SUI)	August 3, 1990 (aged 25)
Jempy Drucker (LUX)	September 3, 1986 (aged 29)
Taylor Eisenhart (Note: Eisenhart joined the team on 1 August as a stagiaire, from BMC Development Team.) (USA)	14 June 1994 (aged 21)
Floris Gerts (NED)	May 3, 1992 (aged 23)
Philippe Gilbert (BEL)	July 5, 1982 (aged 33)
Ben Hermans (BEL)	June 8, 1986 (aged 29)
Stefan Küng (SUI)	November 16, 1993 (aged 22)
Fabian Lienhard (Note: Lienhard joined the team on 1 August as a stagiaire, from BMC Development Team.) (SUI)	3 September 1993 (aged 22)
Amaël Moinard (FRA)	February 2, 1982 (aged 34)

Rider	Date of birth
Daniel Oss (ITA)	January 13, 1987 (aged 29)
Taylor Phinney (USA)	June 27, 1990 (aged 25)
Richie Porte (AUS)	June 30, 1985 (aged 30)
Manuel Quinziato (ITA)	October 30, 1979 (aged 36)
Joey Rosskopf (USA)	September 5, 1989 (aged 26)
Samuel Sánchez (ESP)	February 5, 1978 (aged 38)
Michael Schär (SUI)	September 29, 1986 (aged 29)
Manuel Senni (ITA)	March 11, 1992 (aged 24)
Dylan Teuns (BEL)	March 1, 1992 (aged 24)
Greg Van Avermaet (BEL)	May 17, 1985 (aged 30)
Tejay van Garderen (USA)	August 12, 1988 (aged 27)
Peter Velits (SVK)	August 12, 1985 (aged 30)
Loïc Vliegen (BEL)	December 20, 1993 (aged 22)
Danilo Wyss (SUI)	August 26, 1985 (aged 30)
Rick Zabel (GER)	December 7, 1993 (aged 22)

Riders who joined the team for the 2016 season

Rider	2015 team
Tom Bohli	neo-pro (BMC Development Team)
Floris Gerts	neo-pro (BMC Development Team)
Richie Porte	Team Sky

Riders who left the team during or after the 2015 season

Rider	2016 team
Cadel Evans	Retired
Campbell Flakemore	Retired
Klaas Lodewyck	Retired
Peter Stetina	Trek–Segafredo

== Season victories ==
Date	Race	Competition	Rider	Country	Location
23 January	Tour Down Under, Stage 5	UCI World Tour	Richie Porte (AUS)	Australia	Willunga Hill
12 February	Tour of Qatar, Team classification	UCI Asia Tour	(Note: The riders on the squad were Greg Van Avermaet, Tom Bohli, Jempy Drucker, Daniel Oss, Manuel Quinziato, Joey Rosskopf, Michael Schär and Rick Zabel)	Qatar	
13 February	Vuelta a Murcia	UCI Europe Tour	Philippe Gilbert (BEL)	Spain	Murcia
20 February	Vuelta a Andalucía, Stage 4	UCI Europe Tour	Tejay van Garderen (USA)	Spain	Alhaurín de la Torre
21 February	Vuelta a Andalucía, Mountains classification	UCI Europe Tour	Damiano Caruso (ITA)	Spain	
21 February	Vuelta a Andalucía, Team classification	UCI Europe Tour	(Note: The riders on the squad were Tejay van Garderen, Philippe Gilbert, Samuel Sánchez, Ben Hermans, Damiano Caruso, Brent Bookwalter and Darwin Atapuma)	Spain	
27 February	Omloop Het Nieuwsblad	UCI Europe Tour	Greg Van Avermaet (BEL)	Belgium	Gent
4 March	Three Days of West Flanders, Prologue	UCI Europe Tour	Tom Bohli (SUI)	Belgium	Middelkerke
9 March	Tirreno–Adriatico, Stage 1	UCI World Tour	Team time trial (Note: The riders on the squad were Tejay van Garderen, Damiano Caruso, Alessandro De Marchi, Jempy Drucker, Daniel Oss, Taylor Phinney, Manuel Quinziato and Greg Van Avermaet.)	Italy	Lido di Camaiore
14 March	Tirreno–Adriatico, Stage 6	UCI World Tour	Greg Van Avermaet (BEL)	Italy	Cepagatti
15 March	Tirreno–Adriatico, Overall	UCI World Tour	Greg Van Avermaet (BEL)	Italy	
27 March	Volta a Catalunya, Team classification	UCI World Tour	(Note: The riders on the squad were Richie Porte, Philippe Gilbert, Rohan Dennis, Tejay van Garderen, Ben Hermans, Darwin Atapuma, Samuel Sánchez and Brent Bookwalter)	Spain	
31 March	Three Days of De Panne, Mountains classification	UCI Europe Tour	Loïc Vliegen (BEL)	Belgium	
2 April	Volta Limburg Classic	UCI Europe Tour	Floris Gerts (NED)	Netherlands	Eijsden
7 April	Tour of the Basque Country, Stage 4	UCI World Tour	Samuel Sánchez (ESP)	Spain	Orio
20 May	Tour of California, Stage 6	UCI America Tour	Rohan Dennis (AUS)	United States	Folsom
22 May	Tour of California, Team classification	UCI America Tour	(Note: The riders on the squad were Brent Bookwalter, Rohan Dennis, Jempy Drucker, Taylor Phinney, Samuel Sánchez, Michael Schär, Greg Van Avermaet and Danilo Wyss)	United States	
1 June	Tour de Luxembourg, Prologue	UCI Europe Tour	Jempy Drucker (LUX)	Luxembourg	Luxembourg
3 June	Tour de Luxembourg, Stage 2	UCI Europe Tour	Philippe Gilbert (BEL)	Luxembourg	Schifflange
5 June	Tour de Luxembourg, Stage 4	UCI Europe Tour	Philippe Gilbert (BEL)	Luxembourg	Luxembourg
5 June	Tour de Luxembourg, Points classification	UCI Europe Tour	Philippe Gilbert (BEL)	Luxembourg	
15 June	Tour de Suisse, Stage 5	UCI World Tour	Darwin Atapuma (COL)	Switzerland	Carì
17 June	Tour de Suisse, Stage 7	UCI World Tour	Tejay van Garderen (USA)	Austria	Sölden
6 July	Tour de France, Stage 5	UCI World Tour	Greg Van Avermaet (BEL)	France	Le Lioran
7 August	Tour of Utah, Team classification	UCI America Tour	(Note: The riders on the squad were Darwin Atapuma, Tom Bohli, Joey Rosskopf, Manuel Senni, Dylan Teuns, Rick Zabel, Taylor Eisenhart and Fabian Lienhard)	United States	
16 August	Tour du Limousin, Stage 1	UCI Europe Tour	Joey Rosskopf (USA)	France	Oradour-sur-Glane
19 August	Tour du Limousin, Overall	UCI Europe Tour	Joey Rosskopf (USA)	France	
5 September	Vuelta a España, Stage 16	UCI World Tour	Jempy Drucker (LUX)	Spain	Peñíscola
10 September	Tour of Britain, Stage 7b	UCI Europe Tour	Rohan Dennis (AUS)	United Kingdom	Bristol
11 September	Vuelta a España, Team classification	UCI World Tour	(Note: The riders on the squad were Tejay van Garderen, Darwin Atapuma, Silvan Dillier, Jempy Drucker, Philippe Gilbert, Ben Hermans, Samuel Sánchez, Dylan Teuns and Danilo Wyss)	Spain	
11 September	Grand Prix Cycliste de Montréal	UCI World Tour	Greg Van Avermaet (BEL)	Canada	Montreal
20 September	Eneco Tour, Stage 2	UCI World Tour	Rohan Dennis (AUS)	Netherlands	Breda
23 September	Eneco Tour, Stage 5 (TTT)	UCI World Tour	(Note: The riders on the squad were Greg Van Avermaet, Rohan Dennis, Stefan Küng, Daniel Oss, Taylor Phinney, Manuel Quinziato, Joey Rosskopf and Tom Bohli)	Netherlands	Sittard-Geleen

== National, Continental and World champions 2016 ==
Date	Discipline	Jersey	Rider	Country	Location
7 January	Australian National Time Trial Champion		Rohan Dennis (AUS)	Australia	Buninyong
27 May	United States National Time Trial Champion		Taylor Phinney (USA)	United States	Winston-Salem
22 June	Italian National Time Trial Champion		Manuel Quinziato (ITA)	Italy	Romanengo
26 June	Belgian National Road Race Champion		Philippe Gilbert (BEL)	Belgium	Lacs de l'Eau d'Heure
