= 2016 Astana season =

Astana
- 2016 season
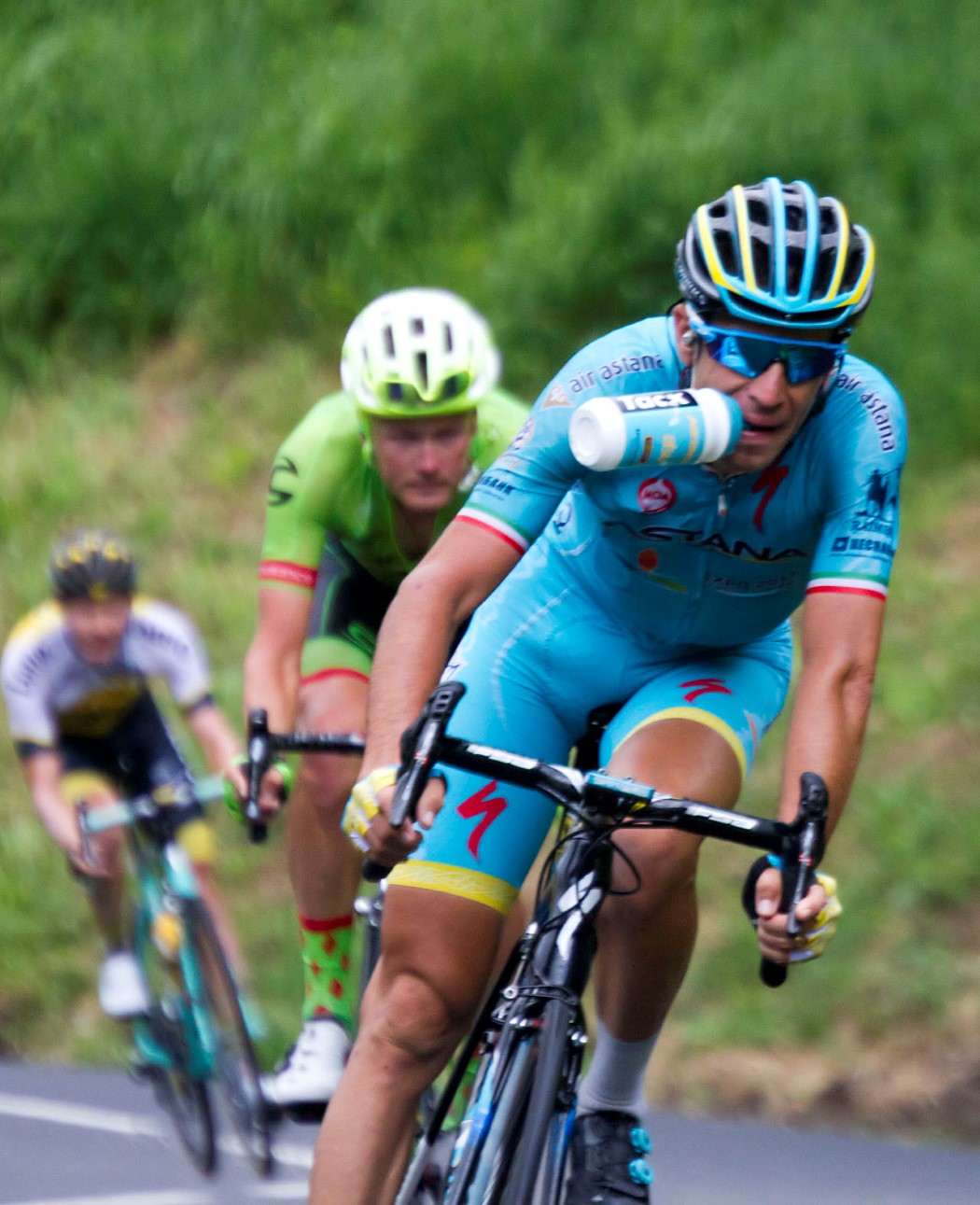
- Vincenzo Nibali in 2016 Tour de France
- UCI code: AST
- Status: UCI ProTeam
- World Tour Rank: 10th
- Chairman: Alexander Vinokourov
- Main sponsor(s): Samruk-Kazyna
- Based: Kazakhstan
- Bicycles: Specialized
- Groupset: Campagnolo

Season victories
- One-day races: 2
- Stage race overall: 6
- Stage race stages: 21
- Grand Tours: 1
- National Championships: 4
- Best ranked rider: Vincenzo Nibali

The 2016 season for the Astana cycling team began in January with the Tour Down Under. As a UCI WorldTeam, they were automatically invited and obligated to send a squad to every event in the UCI World Tour.

== Team roster ==
As of 29 March 2016

Rider	Date of birth
Valerio Agnoli (ITA)	6 January 1985 (aged 31)
Fabio Aru (ITA)	3 July 1990 (aged 25)
Maxat Ayazbayev (KAZ)	27 January 1992 (aged 24)
Lars Boom (NED)	30 December 1985 (aged 30)
Eros Capecchi (ITA)	13 June 1986 (aged 29)
Dario Cataldo (ITA)	17 March 1985 (aged 31)
Laurens De Vreese (BEL)	29 September 1988 (aged 27)
Daniil Fominykh (KAZ)	28 August 1991 (aged 24)
Jakob Fuglsang (DEN)	22 March 1985 (aged 31)
Dmitriy Gruzdev (KAZ)	13 March 1986 (aged 30)
Andrea Guardini (ITA)	12 June 1989 (aged 26)
Andriy Hrivko (UKR)	7 August 1983 (aged 32)
Arman Kamyshev (KAZ)	14 March 1991 (aged 25)
Tanel Kangert (EST)	11 March 1987 (aged 29)

Rider	Date of birth
Bakhtiyar Kozhatayev (KAZ)	28 March 1992 (aged 24)
Miguel Ángel López (COL)	4 February 1994 (aged 22)
Alexey Lutsenko (KAZ)	7 September 1992 (aged 23)
Davide Malacarne (ITA)	11 June 1987 (aged 28)
Vincenzo Nibali (ITA)	14 November 1984 (aged 31)
Diego Rosa (ITA)	27 March 1989 (aged 27)
Luis León Sánchez (ESP)	24 November 1983 (aged 32)
Michele Scarponi (ITA)	25 September 1979 (aged 36)
Gatis Smukulis (LAT)	15 April 1987 (aged 28)
Paolo Tiralongo (ITA)	8 July 1977 (aged 38)
Ruslan Tleubayev (KAZ)	7 March 1987 (aged 29)
Alessandro Vanotti (ITA)	16 September 1980 (aged 35)
Lieuwe Westra (NED)	11 September 1982 (aged 33)
Andrey Zeits (KAZ)	14 December 1986 (aged 29)

Riders who joined the team for the 2016 season

Rider	2015 team
Eros Capecchi	Movistar Team
Gatis Smukulis	Team Katusha
Oleg Zemlyakov	neo-pro (Vino 4ever)

Riders who left the team during or after the 2015 season

Rider	2016 team
Borut Bozic	Cofidis
Alexsandr Dyachenko	Retired
Mikel Landa	Team Sky
Rein Taaramäe	Team Katusha

== Season victories ==
Date	Race	Competition	Rider	Country	Location
23 January	Tour de San Luis, Stage 6	UCI America Tour	Miguel Ángel López (COL)	Argentina	Filo de la Sierra de Comechingones
24 January	Tour de San Luis, Young rider classification	UCI America Tour	Miguel Ángel López (COL)	Argentina	
13 February	La Méditerranéenne, Stage 3	UCI Europe Tour	Andriy Hrivko (UKR)	France	Pegomas
14 February	La Méditerranéenne, Overall	UCI Europe Tour	Andriy Hrivko (UKR)	France	
18 February	Volta ao Algarve, Stage 2	UCI Europe Tour	Luis León Sánchez (ESP)	Portugal	Alto da Foía
19 February	Tour of Oman, Stage 4	UCI Asia Tour	Vincenzo Nibali (ITA)	Oman	Jebel Akhdar
21 February	Tour of Oman, Overall	UCI Asia Tour	Vincenzo Nibali (ITA)	Oman	
24 February	Tour de Langkawi, Stage 1	UCI Asia Tour	Andrea Guardini (ITA)	Malaysia	Baling
27 February	Tour de Langkawi, Stage 4	UCI Asia Tour	Miguel Ángel López (COL)	Malaysia	Tanah Rata
28 February	Tour de Langkawi, Stage 5	UCI Asia Tour	Andrea Guardini (ITA)	Malaysia	Kuala Lumpur
1 March	Tour de Langkawi, Stage 7	UCI Asia Tour	Andrea Guardini (ITA)	Malaysia	Parit Sulong
2 March	Tour de Langkawi, Stage 8	UCI Asia Tour	Andrea Guardini (ITA)	Malaysia	Malacca
2 March	Tour de Langkawi, Points Classification	UCI Asia Tour	Andrea Guardini (ITA)	Malaysia	
11 March	Paris–Nice, Stage 5	UCI World Tour	Alexey Lutsenko (KAZ)	France	Salon-de-Provence
31 March	Three Days of De Panne, Overall	UCI Europe Tour	Lieuwe Westra (NED)	Belgium	
31 March	Three Days of De Panne, Team classification	UCI Europe Tour	(Note: The riders on the squad were Laurens de Vreese, Jakob Fuglsang, Dmitriy Gruzdev, Andrea Guardini, Arman Kamyshev, Alexey Lutsenko, Lars Boom and Lieuwe Westra)	Belgium	
4 April	Tour of the Basque Country, Stage 1	UCI World Tour	Luis León Sánchez (ESP)	Spain	Markina-Xemein
8 April	Tour of the Basque Country, Stage 5	UCI World Tour	Diego Rosa (ITA)	Spain	Arrate (Eibar)
9 April	Tour of the Basque Country, Mountains classification	UCI World Tour	Diego Rosa (ITA)	Spain	
19 April	Giro del Trentino, Stage 1 (TTT)	UCI Europe Tour	(Note: The riders on the squad were Vincenzo Nibali, Valerio Agnoli, Eros Capecchi, Jakob Fuglsang, Tanel Kangert, Bakhtiyar Kozhatayev, Davide Malacarne and Michele Scarponi)	Italy	Torbole
21 April	Giro del Trentino, Stage 3	UCI Europe Tour	Tanel Kangert (EST)	Italy	Mezzolombardo
22 April	Giro del Trentino, Stage 4	UCI Europe Tour	Tanel Kangert (EST)	Italy	Cles
27 May	Giro d'Italia, Stage 19	UCI World Tour	Vincenzo Nibali (ITA)	France	Risoul
29 May	Giro d'Italia, Overall	UCI World Tour	Vincenzo Nibali (ITA)	Italy	
29 May	Giro d'Italia, Team classification	UCI World Tour	(Note: The riders on the squad were Vincenzo Nibali, Valerio Agnoli, Eros Capecchi, Jakob Fuglsang, Tanel Kangert, Bakhtiyar Kozhatayev, Davide Malacarne, Michele Scarponi and Andrey Zeits)	Italy	
8 June	Critérium du Dauphiné, Stage 3	UCI World Tour	Fabio Aru (ITA)	France	Tournon-sur-Rhône
19 June	Tour de Suisse, Overall	UCI World Tour	Miguel Ángel López (COL)	Switzerland	
9 July	Tour of Austria, Mountains classification	UCI Europe Tour	Alessandro Vanotti (ITA)	Austria	
3 August	Vuelta a Burgos, Stage 2 (TTT)	UCI Europe Tour	(Note: The riders on the squad were Eros Capecchi, Davide Malacarne, Dmitriy Gruzdev, Dario Cataldo, Michele Scarponi, Alessandro Vanotti and Daniil Fominykh)	Spain	Burgos
28 September	Milano–Torino	UCI Europe Tour	Miguel Ángel López (COL)	Italy	Turin
2 October	Tour of Almaty	UCI Asia Tour	Alexey Lutsenko (KAZ)	Kazakhstan	Almaty
22 October	Abu Dhabi Tour, Stage 3	UCI Asia Tour	Tanel Kangert (EST)	United Arab Emirates	Jebel Hafeet
23 October	Abu Dhabi Tour, Overall	UCI Asia Tour	Tanel Kangert (EST)	United Arab Emirates	
23 October	Tour of Hainan, Stage 2	UCI Asia Tour	Ruslan Tleubayev (KAZ)	China	Haikou
29 October	Tour of Hainan, Stage 8	UCI Asia Tour	Alexey Lutsenko (KAZ)	China	Qiongzhong
30 October	Tour of Hainan, Overall	UCI Asia Tour	Alexey Lutsenko (KAZ)	China	

== National, Continental and World champions 2016 ==
Date	Discipline	Jersey	Rider	Country	Location
22 June	Kazakhstan National Time Trial Champion		Dmitriy Gruzdev (KAZ)	Kazakhstan	Almaty
22 June	Latvian National Time Trial Champion		Gatis Smukulis (LAT)	Latvia	Rauna
26 June	Kazakhstan National Road Race Champion		Arman Kamyshev (KAZ)	Kazakhstan	Almaty
26 June	Latvian National Road Race Champion		Gatis Smukulis (LAT)	Latvia	Cesis
