= 2016 Trek–Segafredo season =

Trek-Segafredo
- 2016 season
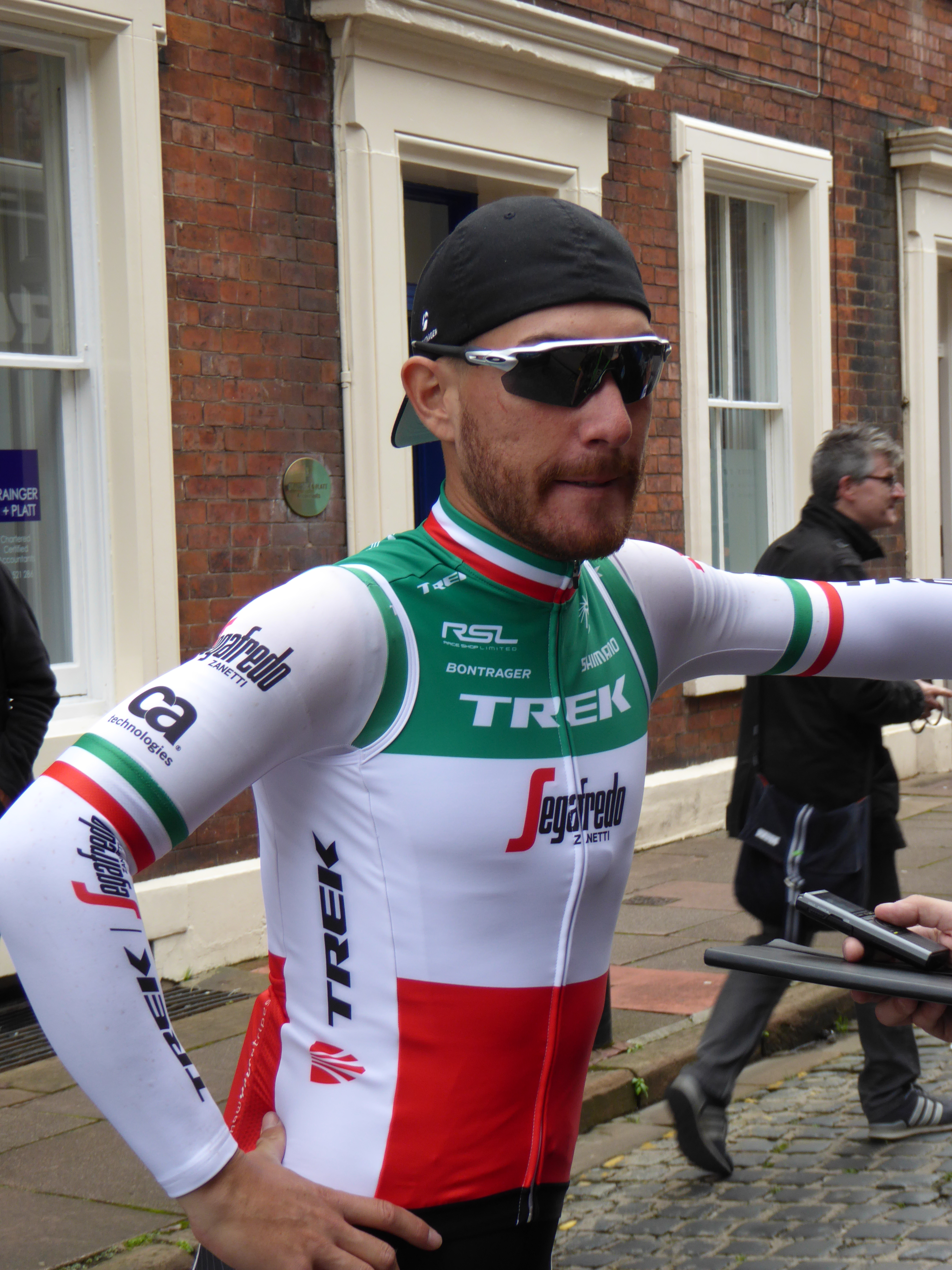
- Giacomo Nizzolo on 2016 Tour of Britain
- UCI code: TFS
- Status: UCI ProTeam
- Manager: Luca Guercilena
- Main sponsor(s): Trek
- Based: United States
- Bicycles: Trek
- Groupset: Shimano

Season victories
- One-day races: 4
- Stage race stages: 11
- National Championships: 3
- Jersey

The 2016 season for the Trek-Segafredo cycling team began in January at the Tour Down Under. As a UCI WorldTeam, they were automatically invited and obligated to send a squad to every event in the UCI World Tour.

== Team roster ==
As of January 1, 2016

| Rider | Date of birth |
|---|---|
| Eugenio Alafaci (ITA) | August 9, 1990 (aged 25) |
| Piet Allegaert (Note: Allegaert joined the team on 1 August as a stagiaire, from EFC–Etixx.) (BEL) | January 20, 1995 (aged 20) |
| Julián Arredondo (COL) | July 30, 1988 (aged 27) |
| Fumiyuki Beppu (JPN) | April 10, 1983 (aged 32) |
| Julien Bernard (FRA) | March 17, 1992 (aged 23) |
| Jack Bobridge (AUS) | July 13, 1989 (aged 26) |
| Niccolò Bonifazio (ITA) | October 29, 1993 (aged 22) |
| Fabian Cancellara (SUI) | March 18, 1981 (aged 34) |
| Marco Coledan (ITA) | August 22, 1988 (aged 27) |
| Stijn Devolder (BEL) | August 29, 1979 (aged 36) |
| Laurent Didier (LUX) | July 19, 1984 (aged 31) |
| Fabio Felline (ITA) | March 29, 1990 (aged 25) |
| Ryder Hesjedal (CAN) | December 9, 1980 (aged 35) |
| Markel Irizar (ESP) | February 5, 1980 (aged 35) |

| Rider | Date of birth |
|---|---|
| Bauke Mollema (NED) | November 26, 1986 (aged 29) |
| Jacopo Mosca (Note: Mosca joined the team on 1 August as a stagiaire, from Viris Maserati-Sisal Matchpoint.) (ITA) | August 29, 1993 (aged 22) |
| Giacomo Nizzolo (ITA) | January 30, 1989 (aged 26) |
| Yaroslav Popovych (Note: Popovych retired from cycling on April 11.) (UKR) | January 4, 1980 (aged 35) |
| Grégory Rast (SUI) | January 17, 1980 (aged 35) |
| Kiel Reijnen (USA) | June 1, 1986 (aged 29) |
| José Luis Rodríguez Aguilar (Note: Rodríguez Aguilar joined the team on 1 August as a stagiaire, from World Cycling Centre.) (CHI) | June 1, 1994 (aged 21) |
| Fränk Schleck (LUX) | April 15, 1980 (aged 35) |
| Peter Stetina (USA) | August 8, 1987 (aged 28) |
| Jasper Stuyven (BEL) | April 17, 1992 (aged 23) |
| Edward Theuns (BEL) | April 30, 1991 (aged 24) |
| Boy van Poppel (NED) | January 18, 1988 (aged 27) |
| Riccardo Zoidl (AUT) | April 8, 1988 (aged 27) |
| Haimar Zubeldia (ESP) | April 1, 1977 (aged 38) |

Riders who joined the team for the 2016 season

| Rider | 2015 team |
|---|---|
| Julien Bernard | neo-pro (Olympique de Dijon) |
| Jack Bobridge | Team Budget Forklifts |
| Niccolo Bonifazio | Lampre–Merida |
| Ryder Hesjedal | Cannondale–Garmin |
| Kiel Reijnen | UnitedHealthcare |
| Peter Stetina | BMC Racing Team |
| Edward Theuns | Topsport Vlaanderen–Baloise |

Riders who left the team during or after the 2015 season

| Rider | 2016 team |
|---|---|
| Matthew Busche | UnitedHealthcare |
| Bob Jungels | Etixx–Quick-Step |
| Daniel McConnell | |
| Hayden Roulston | Retired |
| Jesse Sergent | AG2R La Mondiale |
| Fábio Silvestre | Leopard Pro Cycling |
| Gert Steegmans | Retired |
| Kristof Vandewalle | Retired |
| Calvin Watson | An Post–Chain Reaction |
| Danny van Poppel | Team Sky |

== Season victories ==
| Date | Race | Competition | Rider | Country | Location |
|---|---|---|---|---|---|
| 30 January | Trofeo Serra de Tramuntana | UCI Europe Tour | Fabian Cancellara (SWI) | Spain | Mallorca |
| 19 February | Volta ao Algarve, Stage 3 (ITT) | UCI Europe Tour | Fabian Cancellara (SWI) | Spain | Sagres |
| 28 February | Kuurne–Brussels–Kuurne | UCI Europe Tour | Jasper Stuyven (BEL) | Belgium | Kuurne |
| 5 March | Strade Bianche | UCI Europe Tour | Fabian Cancellara (SWI) | Italy | Siena |
| 15 March | Tirreno–Adriatico, Stage 7 | UCI World Tour | Fabian Cancellara (SWI) | Italy | San Benedetto del Tronto |
| 19 April | Tour of Croatia, Stage 1 | UCI Europe Tour | Giacomo Nizzolo (ITA) | Croatia | Varaždin |
| 21 April | Tour of Croatia, Stage 3 | UCI Europe Tour | Giacomo Nizzolo (ITA) | Croatia | Šibenik |
| 22 April | Tour of Croatia, Stage 4 | UCI Europe Tour | Riccardo Zoidl (AUT) | Croatia | Ucka |
| 24 April | Tour of Croatia, Points classification | UCI Europe Tour | Giacomo Nizzolo (ITA) | Croatia | |
| 24 April | Tour of Croatia, Mountains classification | UCI Europe Tour | Riccardo Zoidl (AUT) | Croatia | |
| 26 May | Tour of Belgium, Stage 1 | UCI Europe Tour | Edward Theuns (BEL) | Belgium | Knokke-Heist |
| 29 May | Giro d'Italia, Points classification | UCI World Tour | Giacomo Nizzolo (ITA) | Italy | |
| 9 June | Grand Prix of Aargau Canton | UCI Europe Tour | Giacomo Nizzolo (ITA) | Switzerland | Leuggern |
| 11 June | Tour de Suisse, Stage 1 | UCI World Tour | Fabian Cancellara (SWI) | Switzerland | Baar |
| 14 July | Tour de Pologne, Stage 3 | UCI World Tour | Niccolò Bonifazio (ITA) | Poland | Nowy Sacz |
| 5 August | Tour of Utah, Stage 5 | UCI America Tour | Kiel Reijnen (USA) | United States | Bountiful |
| 7 August | Tour of Utah, Points classification | UCI America Tour | Kiel Reijnen (USA) | United States | |
| 4 September | Tour of Alberta, Stage 4 | UCI America Tour | Bauke Mollema (NED) | Canada | Edmonton |
| 20 October | Abu Dhabi Tour, Stage 1 | UCI Asia Tour | Giacomo Nizzolo (ITA) | United Arab Emirates | Madinat Zayed |
| 23 October | Abu Dhabi Tour, Young rider classification | UCI Asia Tour | Julien Bernard (FRA) | United Arab Emirates | |

== National, Continental and World champions 2016 ==
| Date | Discipline | Jersey | Rider | Country | Location |
|---|---|---|---|---|---|
| 6 January | National Road Race Championships | | Jack Bobridge (AUS) | Australia | Ballarat |
| 22 June | Swiss National Time Trial Champion | | Fabian Cancellara (SUI) | Switzerland | Martigny |
| 26 June | National Road Race Championships | | Giacomo Nizzolo (ITA) | Italy | Darfo Boario Terme |
