= 2016 Dimension Data season =

Dimension Data
- 2016 season
- UCI code: DDD
- Status: UCI WorldTeam
- Manager: Douglas Ryder; Brian Smith (July–)
- Main sponsor(s): Dimension Data
- Based: South Africa
- Bicycles: Cervélo

Season victories
- One-day races: 1
- Stage race overall: 3
- Stage race stages: 21
- National Championships: 8

The 2016 season for the Team Dimension Data cycling team began in January at the Tour Down Under. It was the team's first season with this name, having previously competed as MTN–Qhubeka. It was also the team's first season as a UCI WorldTeam.

== Team roster ==
As of 10 January 2016

Rider	Date of birth
Igor Anton (ESP)	2 March 1983 (aged 32)
Natnael Berhane (ERI)	5 January 1991 (aged 25)
Edvald Boasson Hagen (NOR)	17 May 1987 (aged 28)
Theo Bos (NED)	22 August 1983 (aged 32)
Matt Brammeier (IRL)	7 June 1985 (aged 30)
Mark Cavendish (GBR)	21 May 1985 (aged 30)
Steve Cummings (GBR)	19 March 1981 (aged 34)
Mekseb Debesay (ERI)	16 June 1991 (aged 24)
Nicolas Dougall (RSA)	21 November 1992 (aged 23)
Bernhard Eisel (AUT)	17 February 1981 (aged 34)
Metkel Eyob (Note: Eyob joined the team on 29 July as a stagiaire, from Dimension Data for Qhubeka.) (ERI)	4 September 1993 (aged 22)
Tyler Farrar (USA)	2 June 1984 (aged 31)
Omar Fraile (ESP)	17 July 1990 (aged 25)
Amanuel Gebrezgabihier (Note: Gebrezgabihier joined the team on 29 July as a stagiaire, from Dimension Data for Qhubeka.) (ERI)	17 August 1994 (aged 21)
Ryan Gibbons (Note: Gibbons joined the team on 29 July as a stagiaire, from Dimension Data for Qhubeka.) (RSA)	13 August 1994 (aged 21)
Nathan Haas (AUS)	12 March 1989 (aged 26)

Rider	Date of birth
Jacques Janse van Rensburg (RSA)	6 September 1987 (aged 28)
Reinardt Janse van Rensburg (RSA)	3 February 1989 (aged 26)
Songezo Jim (RSA)	19 September 1990 (aged 25)
Merhawi Kudus (ERI)	23 January 1994 (aged 21)
Cameron Meyer (Note: Meyer left the team on June 15.) (AUS)	11 June 1988 (aged 27)
Adrien Niyonshuti (RWA)	2 February 1987 (aged 28)
Serge Pauwels (BEL)	21 November 1983 (aged 32)
Youcef Reguigui (ALG)	9 January 1990 (aged 26)
Mark Renshaw (AUS)	22 October 1982 (aged 33)
Kristian Sbaragli (ITA)	8 May 1990 (aged 25)
Kanstantsin Siutsou (BLR)	9 August 1982 (aged 33)
Daniel Teklehaymanot (ERI)	10 November 1988 (aged 27)
Jay Thomson (RSA)	12 April 1986 (aged 29)
Johann Van Zyl (RSA)	2 February 1991 (aged 24)
Jaco Venter (RSA)	13 February 1987 (aged 28)

Riders who joined the team for the 2016 season
Rider	2015 team
Igor Antón	Movistar Team
Mark Cavendish	Etixx–Quick-Step
Mekseb Debesay	neo-pro (Bike Aid)
Bernhard Eisel	Team Sky
Omar Fraile	Caja Rural–Seguros RGA
Nathan Haas	Cannondale–Garmin
Cameron Meyer	Orica–GreenEDGE
Mark Renshaw	Etixx–Quick-Step
Kanstantsin Sivtsov	Team Sky

Riders who left the team during or after the 2015 season
Rider	2016 team
Gerald Ciolek	Stölting Service Group
Matthew Goss	ONE Pro Cycling
Louis Meintjes	Lampre–Merida
Andreas Stauff	

== Season victories ==
Date	Race	Competition	Rider	Country	Location
8 February	Tour of Qatar, Stage 1	UCI Asia Tour	Mark Cavendish (GBR)	Qatar	Al Khor Corniche
10 February	Tour of Qatar, Stage 3	UCI Asia Tour	Edvald Boasson Hagen (NOR)	Qatar	Lusail
12 February	Tour of Qatar, Overall	UCI Asia Tour	Mark Cavendish (GBR)	Qatar	
17 February	Tour of Oman, Stage 2	UCI Asia Tour	Edvald Boasson Hagen (NOR)	Oman	Qurayyat
20 February	Tour of Oman, Stage 4	UCI Asia Tour	Edvald Boasson Hagen (NOR)	Oman	Ministry of Tourism
21 February	Tour of Oman, Points classification	UCI Asia Tour	Edvald Boasson Hagen (NOR)	Oman	
21 February	Tour of Oman, Teams classifications	UCI Asia Tour	(Note: The riders on the squad were Edvald Boasson Hagen, Tyler Farrar, Nathan Haas, Jacques Janse van Rensburg, Merhawi Kudus, Serge Pauwels, Youcef Reguigui and Daniel Teklehaymanot)	Oman	
2 March	Tour de Langkawi, Overall	UCI Asia Tour	Reinardt Janse van Rensburg (RSA)	Malaysia	
12 March	Tirreno–Adriatico, Stage 4	UCI World Tour	Steve Cummings (GBR)	Italy	Foligno
6 April	Tour of the Basque Country, Stage 3	UCI World Tour	Steve Cummings (GBR)	Spain	Lesaka
20 April	Tour of Croatia, Stage 2	UCI Europe Tour	Mark Cavendish (GBR)	Croatia	Split
1 May	Tour de Yorkshire, Mountains Classification	UCI Europe Tour	Nathan Haas (AUS)	United Kingdom	
21 May	Tour of Norway, Stage 4	UCI Europe Tour	Edvald Boasson Hagen (NOR)	Norway	Eggemoen
22 May	Tour of Norway, Stage 5	UCI Europe Tour	Edvald Boasson Hagen (NOR)	Norway	Sarpsborg
22 May	Tour of California, Stage 8	UCI America Tour	Mark Cavendish (GBR)	United States	Sacramento
9 June	Critérium du Dauphiné, Stage 4	UCI World Tour	Edvald Boasson Hagen (NOR)	France	Belley
12 June	Critérium du Dauphiné, Stage 8	UCI World Tour	Steve Cummings (GBR)	France	SuperDévoluy
12 June	Critérium du Dauphiné, Points classification	UCI World Tour	Edvald Boasson Hagen (NOR)	France	
12 June	Critérium du Dauphiné, Mountains classification	UCI World Tour	Daniel Teklehaimanot (ERI)	France	
2 July	Tour de France, Stage 1	UCI World Tour	Mark Cavendish (GBR)	France	Sainte-Marie-du-Mont, Manche
4 July	Tour de France, Stage 3	UCI World Tour	Mark Cavendish (GBR)	France	Angers
7 July	Tour de France, Stage 6	UCI World Tour	Mark Cavendish (GBR)	France	Montauban
8 July	Tour de France, Stage 7	UCI World Tour	Steve Cummings (GBR)	France	Lac de Payolle
16 July	Tour de France, Stage 14	UCI World Tour	Mark Cavendish (GBR)	France	Villars-les-Dombes
5 August	Vuelta a Burgos, Stage 4	UCI Europe Tour	Nathan Haas (AUS)	Spain	Lerma
6 August	Vuelta a Burgos, Mountains classification	UCI Europe Tour	Omar Fraile (ESP)	Spain	
11 September	Tour of Britain, Overall	UCI Europe Tour	Steve Cummings (GBR)	United Kingdom	
11 September	Vuelta a España, Mountains classification	UCI World Tour	Omar Fraile (ESP)	Spain	
25 September	Eneco Tour, Stage 7	UCI World Tour	Edvald Boasson Hagen (NOR)	Belgium	Geraardsbergen
21 October	Abu Dhabi Tour, Stage 2	UCI Asia Tour	Mark Cavendish (GBR)	United Arab Emirates	Abu Dhabi
23 October	Abu Dhabi Tour, Stage 4	UCI Asia Tour	Mark Cavendish (GBR)	United Arab Emirates	Yas Marina Circuit
23 October	Abu Dhabi Tour, Points classification	UCI Asia Tour	Mark Cavendish (GBR)	United Arab Emirates	

== National, Continental and World champions 2016 ==
Date	Discipline	Jersey	Rider	Country	Location
14 February	South African National Road Race Champion		Jaco Venter (RSA)	South Africa	Westville
23 June	Belarusian National Time Trial Champion		Kanstantsin Sivtsov (BLR)	Belarus	Pruzhany
23 June	Eritrean National Time Trial Champion		Daniel Teklehaimanot (ERI)	Eritrea	Asmara
23 June	Norwegian National Time Trial Champion		Edvald Boasson Hagen (NOR)	Norway	Saltstraumen
23 June	Rwanda National Time Trial Champion		Adrien Niyonshuti (RWA)	Rwanda	Nyamata
26 June	Belarusian National Road Race Champion		Kanstantsin Sivtsov (BLR)	Belarus	Navahrudak
26 June	Eritrean National National Road Race Champion		Daniel Teklehaimanot (ERI)	Eritrea	Asmara
26 June	Norwegian National Road Race Champion		Edvald Boasson Hagen (NOR)	Norway	Bodø
