= 2016 Cannondale season =

Cannondale–Drapac
- 2016 season
- UCI code: CPT
- Status: UCI ProTeam
- Manager: Jonathan Vaughters
- Main sponsor(s): Cannondale
- Based: Boulder, Colorado, United States
- Bicycles: Cannondale
- Groupset: Shimano

Season victories
- One-day races: 2
- Stage race stages: 6
- National Championships: 2
- Jersey

The 2016 season for the Cannondale–Drapac cycling team began in January at the Tour Down Under. As a UCI WorldTeam, they are obligated to send a squad to every event in the UCI World Tour.

== Team roster ==
As of 29 March 2016

Rider	Date of birth
Jack Bauer (NZL)	April 7, 1985 (aged 30)
Alberto Bettiol (ITA)	October 23, 1993 (aged 22)
Patrick Bevin (NZL)	May 1, 1991 (aged 24)
Matti Breschel (DEN)	31 August 1984 (aged 31)
Nate Brown (USA)	July 6, 1991 (aged 24)
André Cardoso (POR)	September 3, 1984 (aged 31)
Simon Clarke (AUS)	July 18, 1986 (aged 29)
Lawson Craddock (USA)	February 20, 1992 (aged 24)
Jonathan Dibben (Note: Dibben joined the team on 1 August as a stagiaire, from WIGGINS.) (GBR)	February 12, 1994 (aged 22)
Joe Dombrowski (USA)	May 12, 1991 (aged 24)
Davide Formolo (ITA)	October 25, 1992 (aged 23)
Phil Gaimon (USA)	January 26, 1986 (aged 30)
Alex Howes (USA)	January 1, 1988 (aged 28)
Ben King (USA)	March 22, 1989 (aged 27)
Kristijan Koren (SLO)	November 25, 1986 (aged 29)
Sebastian Langeveld (NED)	January 17, 1985 (aged 31)

Rider	Date of birth
Alan Marangoni (ITA)	July 16, 1984 (aged 31)
Moreno Moser (ITA)	December 25, 1990 (aged 25)
Ryan Mullen (IRL)	August 7, 1994 (aged 21)
Ramūnas Navardauskas (LTU)	January 30, 1988 (aged 28)
Pierre Rolland (FRA)	October 10, 1986 (aged 29)
Kristoffer Skjerping (NOR)	May 4, 1993 (aged 22)
Toms Skujiņš (LAT)	June 15, 1991 (aged 24)
Tom-Jelte Slagter (NED)	July 1, 1989 (aged 26)
Andrew Talansky (USA)	November 23, 1988 (aged 27)
Dylan van Baarle (NED)	May 22, 1993 (aged 22)
Davide Villella (ITA)	June 27, 1991 (aged 24)
Rigoberto Urán (COL)	January 26, 1987 (aged 29)
Wouter Wippert (NED)	August 14, 1990 (aged 25)
Michael Woods (CAN)	October 12, 1986 (aged 29)
Ruben Zepuntke (GER)	January 29, 1993 (aged 23)

Riders who joined the team for the 2016 season

Rider	2015 team
Patrick Bevin	Avanti Racing Team
Matti Breschel	Tinkoff–Saxo
Simon Clarke	Orica–GreenEDGE
Lawson Craddock	Team Giant–Alpecin
Phil Gaimon	Optum–Kelly Benefit Strategies
Ryan Mullen	An Post–Chain Reaction
Pierre Rolland	Team Europcar
Toms Skujiņš	neo-pro (Hincapie Racing Team)
Rigoberto Urán	Etixx–Quick-Step
Wouter Wippert	Drapac Professional Cycling
Michael Woods	neo-pro (Optum–Kelly Benefit Strategies)

Riders who left the team during or after the 2015 season

Rider	2016 team
Janier Acevedo	Team Jamis
Tom Danielson	Fired (tested positive)
Nathan Haas	Team Dimension Data
Lasse Norman Hansen	Stölting Service Group
Ryder Hesjedal	Trek–Segafredo
Edward King	Retired
Dan Martin	Etixx–Quick-Step
Matej Mohorič	Lampre–Merida

== Season victories ==
Date	Race	Competition	Rider	Country	Location
24 January	Tour Down Under, Teams classification	UCI World Tour	(Note: The riders on the squad were Alberto Bettiol, Patrick Bevin, Simon Clarke, Moreno Moser, Wouter Wippert, Michael Woods, and Ruben Zepuntke)	Australia	
20 February	Tour du Haut Var, Stage 1	UCI Europe Tour	Tom-Jelte Slagter (NED)	France	Bagnols-en-Forêt
6 March	GP Industria & Artigianato di Larciano	UCI Europe Tour	Simon Clarke (AUS)	Italy	Larciano
16 May	Tour of California, Stage 2	UCI America Tour	Ben King (USA)	United States	Santa Clarita
19 May	Tour of California, Stage 5	UCI America Tour	Toms Skujiņš (LAT)	United States	South Lake Tahoe
18 July	Tour de Pologne, Sprinters classification	UCI World Tour	Alberto Bettiol (ITA)	Poland	
6 August	Tour of Utah, Stage 6	UCI America Tour	Andrew Talansky (USA)	United States	Snowbird
11 August	Czech Cycling Tour, Stage 1	UCI Europe Tour	(Note: The riders on the squad were Jack Bauer, Patrick Bevin, Sebastian Langeveld, Alan Marangoni, Ryan Mullen, Kristoffer Skjerping, Wouter Wippert, and Ruben Zepuntke)	Czech Republic	Frýdek-Místek
14 August	Czech Cycling Tour, Points classification	UCI Europe Tour	Wouter Wippert (NED)	Czech Republic	
14 August	Czech Cycling Tour, Teams classification	UCI Europe Tour	(Note: The riders on the squad were Jack Bauer, Patrick Bevin, Sebastian Langeveld, Alan Marangoni, Ryan Mullen, Kristoffer Skjerping, Wouter Wippert and Ruben Zepuntke)	Czech Republic	
8 September	Tour of Britain, Stage 5	UCI Europe Tour	Jack Bauer (NZL)	United Kingdom	Bath
23 October	Japan Cup	UCI Asia Tour	Davide Villella (ITA)	Japan	Utsunomiya

== Continental, National, and World championships ==
Date	Discipline	Jersey	Rider	Country	Location
8 January	New Zealand National Time Trial Championships		Patrick Bevin (NZL)	New Zealand	Napier
26 June	Lithuanian National Road Race Championships		Ramūnas Navardauskas (LTU)	Lithuania	Ignalina
