= 2016 Team Katusha season =

Season of a cycling team

Team Katusha
- 2016 season
- UCI code: KAT
- Status: UCI WorldTeam
- Manager: Vyacheslav Ekimov
- Main sponsor(s): Gazprom & Itera & Rostec
- Based: Russia
- Bicycles: Canyon
- Groupset: Shimano

Season victories
- One-day races: 1
- Stage race overall: 1
- Stage race stages: 19
- National Championships: 2

The 2016 season for Team Katusha began in January at the Tour Down Under. As a UCI WorldTeam, they were automatically invited and obligated to send a squad to every event in the UCI World Tour.

== Team roster ==
As of 29 March 2016

| Rider | Date of birth |
|---|---|
| Maxim Belkov (RUS) | 9 January 1985 (aged 31) |
| Sven Erik Bystrøm (NOR) | 21 January 1992 (aged 24) |
| Sergey Chernetskiy (RUS) | 9 April 1990 (aged 25) |
| Jacopo Guarnieri (ITA) | 14 August 1987 (aged 28) |
| Marco Haller (AUT) | 1 April 1991 (aged 24) |
| Vladimir Isaichev (RUS) | 26 April 1986 (aged 29) |
| Pavel Kochetkov (RUS) | 7 March 1986 (aged 30) |
| Dmitry Kozonchuk (RUS) | 5 April 1984 (aged 31) |
| Alexander Kristoff (NOR) | 5 July 1987 (aged 28) |
| Vyacheslav Kuznetsov (RUS) | 24 June 1989 (aged 26) |
| Sergey Lagutin (RUS) | 14 January 1981 (aged 35) |
| Alberto Losada (ESP) | 28 February 1982 (aged 34) |
| Tiago Machado (POR) | 18 October 1985 (aged 30) |
| Alexander Maes (Note: Maes joined the team on 9 August as a stagiaire, from Home Solution-Anmapa-Soenens.) (BEL) | 20 June 1993 (aged 22) |
| Matvey Mamykin (RUS) | 31 October 1994 (aged 21) |

| Rider | Date of birth |
|---|---|
| Michael Mørkøv (DEN) | 30 April 1985 (aged 30) |
| Nils Politt (GER) | 6 March 1994 (aged 22) |
| Alexander Porsev (RUS) | 21 February 1986 (aged 30) |
| Jhonatan Restrepo (COL) | 24 November 1994 (aged 21) |
| Joaquim Rodríguez (ESP) | 12 May 1979 (aged 36) |
| Egor Silin (RUS) | 25 June 1988 (aged 27) |
| Simon Špilak (SLO) | 23 June 1986 (aged 29) |
| Rein Taaramäe (EST) | 24 April 1987 (aged 28) |
| Alexey Tsatevich (RUS) | 5 July 1989 (aged 26) |
| Jurgen Van den Broeck (BEL) | 1 February 1983 (aged 33) |
| Ángel Vicioso (ESP) | 13 April 1977 (aged 38) |
| Eduard Vorganov (RUS) | 1 December 1982 (aged 33) |
| Anton Vorobyev (RUS) | 12 October 1990 (aged 25) |
| Ilnur Zakarin (RUS) | 15 September 1989 (aged 26) |

Riders who joined the team for the 2016 season
| Rider | 2015 team |
|---|---|
| Matvey Mamykin | Itera–Katusha |
| Michael Mørkøv | Tinkoff–Saxo |
| Nils Politt | Team Stölting |
| Jhonatan Restrepo | neo-pro (Coldeportes-Claro) |
| Rein Taaramäe | Astana |
| Jurgen Van den Broeck | Lotto–Soudal |

Riders who left the team during or after the 2015 season
| Rider | 2016 team |
|---|---|
| Giampaolo Caruso | |
| Alexandr Kolobnev | Gazprom–RusVelo |
| Daniel Moreno | Movistar Team |
| Rüdiger Selig | Bora–Argon 18 |
| Luca Paolini | |
| Gatis Smukulis | Astana |
| Yuri Trofimov | Tinkoff |

== Season victories ==
| Date | Race | Competition | Rider | Country | Location |
|---|---|---|---|---|---|
| 9 February | Tour of Qatar, Stage 2 | UCI Asia Tour | Alexander Kristoff (NOR) | Qatar | Doha |
| 11 February | Tour of Qatar, Stage 4 | UCI Asia Tour | Alexander Kristoff (NOR) | Qatar | Madinat ash Shamal |
| 12 February | Tour of Qatar, Stage 5 | UCI Asia Tour | Alexander Kristoff (NOR) | Qatar | Doha Corniche |
| 12 February | Tour of Qatar, Points classification | UCI Asia Tour | Alexander Kristoff (NOR) | Qatar | |
| 18 February | Tour of Oman, Stage 3 | UCI Asia Tour | Alexander Kristoff (NOR) | Oman | Naseem Park |
| 21 February | Tour of Oman, Stage 6 | UCI Asia Tour | Alexander Kristoff (NOR) | Oman | |
| 21 February | Volta ao Algarve, Teams classification | UCI Europe Tour | (Note: The riders on the squad were Tiago Machado, Joaquim Rodríguez, Sergey Lagutin, Alberto Losada, Matvey Mamykin, Rein Taaramäe, Anton Vorobyev and Ilnur Zakarin) | Portugal | |
| 12 March | Paris–Nice, Stage 6 | UCI World Tour | Ilnur Zakarin (RUS) | France | La Madone d'Utelle |
| 27 March | Volta a Catalunya, Stage 7 | UCI World Tour | Alexey Tsatevich (RUS) | Spain | Barcelona |
| 29 March | Three Days of De Panne, Stage 1 | UCI Europe Tour | Alexander Kristoff (NOR) | Belgium | Zottegem |
| 31 March | Three Days of De Panne, Points classification | UCI Europe Tour | Alexander Kristoff (NOR) | Belgium | |
| 6 April | Circuit de la Sarthe, Stage 2b | UCI Europe Tour | Anton Vorobyev (RUS) | France | Angers |
| 7 April | Circuit de la Sarthe, Stage 3 | UCI Europe Tour | Anton Vorobyev (RUS) | France | Pré-en-Pail |
| 8 April | Circuit de la Sarthe, Points classification | UCI Europe Tour | Anton Vorobyev (RUS) | France | |
| 8 April | Circuit de la Sarthe, Mountains classification | UCI Europe Tour | Anton Vorobyev (RUS) | France | |
| 1 May | Eschborn-Frankfurt City Loop | UCI Europe Tour | Alexander Kristoff (NOR) | Germany | Frankfurt |
| 21 May | Tour of California, Stage 7 | UCI America Tour | Alexander Kristoff (NOR) | United States | Santa Rosa |
| 28 May | Giro d'Italia, Stage 20 | UCI World Tour | Rein Taaramäe (EST) | Italy | Sant'Anna di Vinadio |
| 17 June | Tour of Slovenia, Stage 2 | UCI Europe Tour | Rein Taaramäe (EST) | Slovenia | Golte |
| 19 June | Tour of Slovenia, Stage 4 | UCI Europe Tour | Alexander Porsev (RUS) | Slovenia | Novo mesto |
| 19 June | Tour of Slovenia, Overall | UCI Europe Tour | Rein Taaramäe (EST) | Slovenia | |
| 19 June | Tour de Suisse, Teams classification | UCI World Tour | (Note: The riders on the squad were Simon Špilak, Sven Erik Bystrøm, Sergey Chernetskiy, Dmitry Kozonchuk, Sergey Lagutin, Tiago Machado, Matvey Mamykin and Jhonatan Restrepo) | Switzerland | |
| 20 July | Tour de France, Stage 17 | UCI World Tour | Ilnur Zakarin (RUS) | Switzerland | Finhaut-Émosson |
| 6 August | Vuelta a Burgos, Young rider classification | UCI Europe Tour | Matvey Mamykin (RUS) | Spain | |
| 11 August | Arctic Race of Norway, Stage 1 | UCI Europe Tour | Alexander Kristoff (NOR) | Norway | Rognan |
| 1 September | Tour des Fjords, Stage 2 | UCI Europe Tour | Alexander Kristoff (NOR) | Norway | Odda |
| 2 September | Tour des Fjords, Stage 3 | UCI Europe Tour | Alexander Kristoff (NOR) | Norway | Suldalsosen |
| 4 September | Tour des Fjords, Stage 5 | UCI Europe Tour | Alexander Kristoff (NOR) | Norway | Stavanger |
| 4 September | Tour des Fjords, Overall | UCI Europe Tour | Alexander Kristoff (NOR) | Norway | |
| 4 September | Tour des Fjords, Points classification | UCI Europe Tour | Alexander Kristoff (NOR) | Norway | |

== National, Continental and World champions 2016 ==
| Date | Discipline | Jersey | Rider | Country | Location |
|---|---|---|---|---|---|
| 24 June | Russian National Time Trial Champion | | Sergey Chernetskiy (RUS) | Russia | Sevastopol |
| 26 June | Russian National Road Race Champion | | Pavel Kochetkov (RUS) | Russia | Sevastopol |
