= 2016 Lampre–Merida season =

Lampre–Merida
- 2016 season
- UCI code: LAM
- Status: UCI ProTeam
- Manager: Giuseppe Saronni
- Main sponsor(s): Lampre & Merida
- Based: Italy
- Bicycles: Merida
- Groupset: Shimano

Season victories
- Stage race overall: 1
- Stage race stages: 16

The 2016 season for Lampre–Merida began in January at the Tour de San Luis. As a UCI World Team, they were automatically invited, and obligated to send a squad to every event in the UCI World Tour.

== Team roster ==
As of 29 March 2016

Rider	Date of birth
Yukiya Arashiro (JPN)	22 September 1984 (aged 31)
Matteo Bono (ITA)	11 November 1983 (aged 32)
Mattia Cattaneo (ITA)	25 October 1990 (aged 25)
Davide Cimolai (ITA)	13 August 1989 (aged 26)
Valerio Conti (ITA)	30 March 1993 (aged 22)
Mário Costa (POR)	15 November 1985 (aged 30)
Rui Costa (POR)	5 October 1986 (aged 29)
Kristijan Đurasek (CRO)	26 July 1987 (aged 28)
Chun Kai Feng (TWN)	2 November 1988 (aged 27)
Roberto Ferrari (ITA)	9 March 1983 (aged 33)
Tsgabu Grmay (ETH)	25 August 1991 (aged 24)
Ilia Koshevoy (BLR)	20 March 1991 (aged 25)
Marko Kump (SLO)	9 September 1988 (aged 27)
Fausto Masnada (Note: Masnada joined the team on 1 August as a stagiaire, from Team Colpack.) (ITA)	6 November 1993 (aged 22)

Rider	Date of birth
Louis Meintjes (RSA)	21 February 1992 (aged 24)
Sacha Modolo (ITA)	19 June 1987 (aged 28)
Matej Mohorič (SLO)	19 October 1994 (aged 21)
Manuele Mori (ITA)	9 August 1980 (aged 35)
Przemysław Niemiec (POL)	11 April 1980 (aged 35)
Simone Petilli (ITA)	4 May 1993 (aged 22)
Luka Pibernik (SLO)	23 November 1993 (aged 22)
Jan Polanc (SLO)	6 May 1992 (aged 23)
Edward Ravasi (Note: Ravasi joined the team on 1 August as a stagiaire, from Team Colpack.) (ITA)	5 June 1994 (aged 21)
Oliviero Troia (Note: Troia joined the team on 1 August as a stagiaire, from Team Colpack.) (ITA)	1 September 1994 (aged 21)
Diego Ulissi (ITA)	15 July 1989 (aged 26)
Xu Gang (CHN)	28 January 1984 (aged 32)
Federico Zurlo (ITA)	25 February 1994 (aged 22)

Riders who joined the team for the 2016 season

Rider	2015 team
Yukiya Arashiro	Team Europcar
Marko Kump	ex-pro (Adria Mobil)
Louis Meintjes	MTN–Qhubeka
Matej Mohorič	Cannondale–Garmin
Simone Petilli	neo-pro (Unieuro–Wilier)
Federico Zurlo	UnitedHealthcare

Riders who left the team during or after the 2015 season

Rider	2016 team
Niccolò Bonifazio	Trek–Segafredo
Nelson Oliveira	Movistar Team
Rubén Plaza	Orica–GreenEDGE
Filippo Pozzato	Southeast–Venezuela
Maximiliano Richeze	Etixx–Quick-Step
José Serpa	Retires
Rafael Valls	Lotto–Soudal

== Season victories ==
Date	Race	Competition	Rider	Country	Location
26 March	Volta a Catalunya, Stage 6	UCI World Tour	Davide Cimolai (ITA)	Spain	Vilanova i la Geltrú
24 April	Presidential Tour of Turkey, Stage 1	UCI Europe Tour	Przemysław Niemiec (POL)	Turkey	Istanbul
27 April	Presidential Tour of Turkey, Stage 4	UCI Europe Tour	Sacha Modolo (ITA)	Turkey	Alanya
30 April	Presidential Tour of Turkey, Stage 7	UCI Europe Tour	Sacha Modolo (ITA)	Turkey	Marmaris
1 May	Presidential Tour of Turkey, Mountains classification	UCI Europe Tour	Przemysław Niemiec (POL)	Turkey	
10 May	Giro d'Italia, Stage 4	UCI World Tour	Diego Ulissi (ITA)	Italy	Praia a Mare
18 May	Giro d'Italia, Stage 11	UCI World Tour	Diego Ulissi (ITA)	Italy	Asolo
30 May	Tour of Japan, Stage 2	UCI Asia Tour	Davide Cimolai (ITA)	Japan	Kyoto
4 June	Tour of Japan, Stage 7	UCI Asia Tour	Yukiya Arashiro (JPN)	Japan	Izu
18 June	Tour of Slovenia, Stage 3	UCI Europe Tour	Diego Ulissi (ITA)	Slovenia	Celjska koca
23 July	Tour of Qinghai Lake, Stage 7	UCI Asia Tour	Federico Zurlo (ITA)	China	Qingshizui
26 July	Tour of Qinghai Lake, Stage 9	UCI Asia Tour	Marko Kump (SLO)	China	Tianshui
27 July	Tour of Qinghai Lake, Stage 10	UCI Asia Tour	Marko Kump (SLO)	China	Pingliang
12 August	Czech Cycling Tour, Stage 2	UCI Europe Tour	Sacha Modolo (ITA)	Czech Republic	Uničov
13 August	Czech Cycling Tour, Stage 3	UCI Europe Tour	Diego Ulissi (ITA)	Czech Republic	Šternberk
14 August	Czech Cycling Tour, Overall	UCI Europe Tour	Diego Ulissi (ITA)	Czech Republic	
24 September	Eneco Tour, Stage 6	UCI World Tour	Luka Pibernik (SLO)	Belgium	Lanaken
27 October	Tour of Hainan, Stage 6	UCI Asia Tour	Matej Mohorič (SLO)	China	Wuzhishan
30 October	Tour of Hainan, Teams classification	UCI Europe Tour	(Note: The riders on the squad were Przemysław Niemiec, Mario Costa, Roberto Ferrari, Federico Zurlo, Matej Mohorič, Oliviero Troia and Xu Gang)	China	
