= 2016 Team Giant–Alpecin season =

Team Giant–Alpecin
- 2016 season
- UCI code: TGA
- Status: UCI ProTeam
- Manager: Iwan Spekenbrink
- Main sponsor(s): Giant Bicycles & Alpecin
- Based: Germany
- Bicycles: Giant
- Groupset: Shimano

Season victories
- One-day races: 1
- Stage race overall: 1
- Stage race stages: 12
- National Championships: 1

The 2016 season for the Team Giant–Alpecin began in January with the Tour Down Under. As a UCI WorldTeam, they were automatically invited and obligated to send a squad to every event in the UCI World Tour.

== Team roster ==
As of 29 March 2016

| Rider | Date of birth |
|---|---|
| Søren Kragh Andersen (DEN) | 10 August 1994 (aged 21) |
| Nikias Arndt (GER) | 18 November 1991 (aged 24) |
| Bert De Backer (BEL) | 2 April 1984 (aged 31) |
| Warren Barguil (FRA) | 28 October 1991 (aged 24) |
| Roy Curvers (NED) | 27 December 1979 (aged 36) |
| John Degenkolb (GER) | 7 January 1989 (aged 27) |
| Tom Dumoulin (NED) | 11 November 1990 (aged 25) |
| Caleb Fairly (Note: Fairly retired from cycling on May 22.) (USA) | 19 February 1987 (aged 29) |
| Johannes Fröhlinger (GER) | 9 June 1985 (aged 30) |
| Simon Geschke (GER) | 13 March 1986 (aged 30) |
| Lars van der Haar (NED) | 23 July 1991 (aged 24) |
| Chad Haga (USA) | 26 August 1988 (aged 27) |
| Ji Cheng (CHN) | 15 July 1987 (aged 28) |
| Carter Jones (Note: Jones retired from cycling on July 1.) (USA) | 27 February 1989 (aged 27) |

| Rider | Date of birth |
|---|---|
| Max Kanter (Note: Kanter joined the team on 1 August as a stagiaire, from LKT Team Brandenburg.) (GER) | 22 October 1997 (aged 18) |
| Koen de Kort (NED) | 8 September 1982 (aged 33) |
| Fredrik Ludvigsson (SWE) | 28 April 1994 (aged 21) |
| Tobias Ludvigsson (SWE) | 22 February 1991 (aged 25) |
| Sindre Lunke (NOR) | 17 April 1993 (aged 22) |
| Sam Oomen (NED) | 15 August 1995 (aged 20) |
| Georg Preidler (AUT) | 17 June 1990 (aged 25) |
| Ramon Sinkeldam (NED) | 9 February 1989 (aged 27) |
| Tom Stamsnijder (NED) | 15 May 1985 (aged 30) |
| Laurens ten Dam (NED) | 13 November 1980 (aged 35) |
| Albert Timmer (NED) | 13 June 1985 (aged 30) |
| Tom Veelers (NED) | 14 September 1984 (aged 31) |
| Zico Waeytens (BEL) | 29 September 1991 (aged 24) |
| Max Walscheid (GER) | 13 June 1993 (aged 22) |

Riders who joined the team for the 2016 season

| Rider | 2015 team |
|---|---|
| Søren Kragh Andersen | neo-pro (Team TreFor–Blue Water) |
| Sindre Skjølstad Lunke | neo-pro (Team Joker) |
| Sam Oomen | neo-pro (Rabobank Development Team) |
| Laurens ten Dam | LottoNL–Jumbo |
| Maximilian Walscheid | neo-pro (Kuota-Lotto) |

Riders who left the team during or after the 2015 season

| Rider | 2016 team |
|---|---|
| Lawson Craddock | Cannondale |
| Thierry Hupond | Team Marseille 13 KTM |
| Marcel Kittel | Etixx–Quick-Step |
| Luka Mezgec | Orica–GreenEDGE |
| Daan Olivier | Retired |

== Season victories ==
| Date | Race | Competition | Rider | Country | Location |
|---|---|---|---|---|---|
| 12 February | Tour of Qatar, Young rider classification | UCI Asia Tour | Søren Kragh Andersen (DEN) | Qatar | |
| 6 May | Giro d'Italia, Stage 1 | UCI World Tour | Tom Dumoulin (NED) | Netherlands | Apeldoorn |
| 29 May | Giro d'Italia, Stage 21 | UCI World Tour | Nikias Arndt (GER) | Italy | Turin |
| 29 May | Tour of Belgium, Stage 4 | UCI Europe Tour | Zico Waeytens (BEL) | Belgium | Tongeren |
| 10 July | Tour de France, Stage 9 | UCI World Tour | Tom Dumoulin (NED) | Andorra | Andorra Arcalis |
| 15 July | Tour de France, Stage 13 | UCI World Tour | Tom Dumoulin (NED) | France | Caverne du Pont-d'Arc |
| 12 August | Tour de l'Ain, Stage 3 | UCI Europe Tour | Sam Oomen (NED) | France | Lelex Monts-Jura |
| 13 August | Tour de l'Ain, Overall | UCI Europe Tour | Sam Oomen (NED) | France | |
| 13 August | Tour de l'Ain, Young rider classification | UCI Europe Tour | Sam Oomen (NED) | France | |
| 14 August | Arctic Race of Norway, Stage 4 | UCI Europe Tour | John Degenkolb (GER) | Norway | Bodø |
| 14 August | Arctic Race of Norway, Points classification | UCI Europe Tour | John Degenkolb (GER) | Norway | |
| 3 October | Münsterland Giro | UCI Europe Tour | John Degenkolb (GER) | Germany | Münster |
| 24 October | Tour of Hainan, Stage 3 | UCI Asia Tour | Max Walscheid (GER) | China | Chengmai |
| 25 October | Tour of Hainan, Stage 4 | UCI Asia Tour | Max Walscheid (GER) | China | Danzhou |
| 26 October | Tour of Hainan, Stage 5 | UCI Asia Tour | Max Walscheid (GER) | China | Changjiang |
| 28 October | Tour of Hainan, Stage 7 | UCI Asia Tour | Max Walscheid (GER) | China | Sanya |
| 30 October | Tour of Hainan, Stage 9 | UCI Asia Tour | Max Walscheid (GER) | China | Xinglong |
| 30 October | Tour of Hainan, Points classification | UCI Asia Tour | Max Walscheid (GER) | China | |

== National, Continental and World champions 2016 ==
| Date | Discipline | Jersey | Rider | Country | Location |
|---|---|---|---|---|---|
| 22 June | Dutch National Time Trial Champion | | Tom Dumoulin (NED) | Netherlands | Goeree-Overflakkee |
