= 2016 Orica–GreenEDGE season =

Orica–GreenEDGE/BikeExchange
- 2016 season
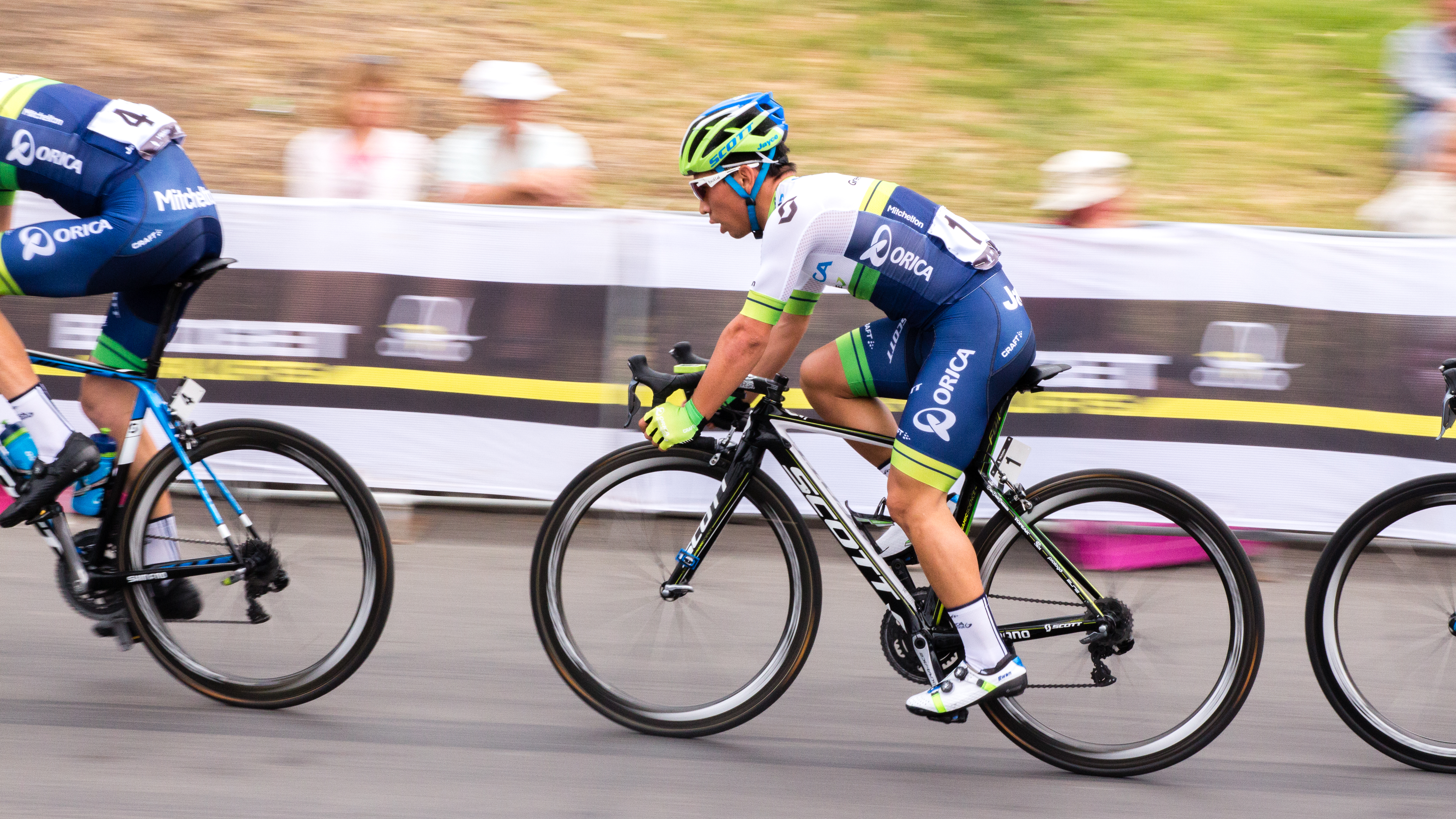
- Caleb Ewan on 2016 Bay Classic Series
- UCI code: OGE
- Status: UCI ProTeam
- Manager: Shayne Bannan
- Main sponsor(s): Orica
- Based: Australia
- Bicycles: Scott
- Groupset: Shimano

Season victories
- One-day races: 3
- Stage race overall: 1
- Stage race stages: 11
- National Championships: 3

The 2016 season for the Orica–BikeExchange cycling team began in January at the Tour Down Under. As a UCI WorldTeam, they were automatically invited and obligated to send a squad to every event in the UCI World Tour.

== Team roster ==
As of 1 August 2016

| Rider | Date of birth |
|---|---|
| Michael Albasini (SUI) | 20 December 1980 (aged 35) |
| Sam Bewley (NZL) | 22 July 1987 (aged 28) |
| Esteban Chaves (COL) | 17 January 1990 (aged 26) |
| Cheung King Lok (HKG) | 8 February 1991 (aged 25) |
| Magnus Cort (DEN) | 16 January 1993 (aged 23) |
| Mitchell Docker (AUS) | 2 October 1986 (aged 29) |
| Luke Durbridge (AUS) | 9 April 1991 (aged 24) |
| Alex Edmondson (AUS) | 22 December 1993 (aged 22) |
| Caleb Ewan (AUS) | 11 July 1994 (aged 21) |
| Simon Gerrans (AUS) | 16 May 1980 (aged 35) |
| Jack Haig (AUS) | 6 September 1993 (aged 22) |
| Mathew Hayman (AUS) | 20 April 1978 (aged 37) |
| Michael Hepburn (AUS) | 17 August 1991 (aged 24) |
| Damien Howson (AUS) | 13 August 1992 (aged 23) |

| Rider | Date of birth |
|---|---|
| Daryl Impey (RSA) | 6 December 1984 (aged 31) |
| Christopher Juul-Jensen (DEN) | 6 July 1989 (aged 26) |
| Jens Keukeleire (BEL) | 23 November 1988 (aged 27) |
| Christian Meier (CAN) | 2 September 1985 (aged 30) |
| Luka Mezgec (SLO) | 27 June 1988 (aged 27) |
| Rubén Plaza (ESP) | 29 February 1980 (aged 36) |
| Robert Power (AUS) | 11 May 1995 (aged 20) |
| Nick Schultz (Note: Schultz joined the team on 1 August as a stagiaire, from SEG Racing Academy.) (AUS) | 13 September 1994 (aged 21) |
| Svein Tuft (CAN) | 19 May 1977 (aged 38) |
| Amets Txurruka (ESP) | 10 November 1982 (aged 33) |
| Carlos Verona (ESP) | 4 November 1992 (aged 23) |
| Adam Yates (GBR) | 7 August 1992 (aged 23) |
| Simon Yates (GBR) | 7 August 1992 (aged 23) |

Riders who joined the team for the 2016 season

| Rider | 2015 team |
|---|---|
| Cheung King Lok | HKSI Pro Cycling Team |
| Alexander Edmondson | neo-pro (Jayco-AIS World Tour Academy) |
| Jack Haig | neo-pro (Jayco-AIS World Tour Academy) |
| Christopher Juul-Jensen | Tinkoff–Saxo |
| Luka Mezgec | Team Giant–Alpecin |
| Rubén Plaza | Lampre–Merida |
| Robert Power | neo-pro (Jayco-AIS World Tour Academy) |
| Amets Txurruka | Caja Rural–Seguros RGA |

Riders who left the team during or after the 2015 season

| Rider | 2016 team |
|---|---|
| Adam Blythe | Tinkoff |
| Simon Clarke | Cannondale |
| Leigh Howard | IAM Cycling |
| Brett Lancaster | Retired |
| Cameron Meyer | Team Dimension Data |
| Jens Mouris | Drapac Professional Cycling |
| Ivan Santaromita | Skydive Dubai–Al Ahli |
| Pieter Weening | Roompot–Oranje Peloton |

== Season victories ==
| Date | Race | Competition | Rider | Country | Location |
|---|---|---|---|---|---|
| 19 January | Tour Down Under, Stage 1 | UCI World Tour | Caleb Ewan (AUS) | Australia | Lyndoch |
| 21 January | Tour Down Under, Stage 3 | UCI World Tour | Simon Gerrans (AUS) | Australia | Campbelltown |
| 22 January | Tour Down Under, Stage 4 | UCI World Tour | Simon Gerrans (AUS) | Australia | Victor Harbor |
| 24 January | Tour Down Under, Stage 6 | UCI World Tour | Caleb Ewan (AUS) | Australia | Adelaide |
| 24 January | Tour Down Under, Overall | UCI World Tour | Simon Gerrans (AUS) | Australia | |
| 24 January | Tour Down Under, Sprints classification | UCI World Tour | Simon Gerrans (AUS) | Australia | |
| 5 February | Herald Sun Tour, Stage 2 | UCI Oceania Tour | Caleb Ewan (AUS) | Australia | Moe |
| 6 March | Paris–Nice, Prologue | UCI World Tour | Michael Matthews (AUS) | France | Conflans-Sainte-Honorine |
| 8 March | Paris–Nice, Stage 2 | UCI World Tour | Michael Matthews (AUS) | France | Commentry |
| 13 March | Paris–Nice, Points classification | UCI World Tour | Michael Matthews (AUS) | France | |
| 3 April | Vuelta a La Rioja | UCI Europe Tour | Michael Matthews (AUS) | Spain | Logroño |
| 10 April | Paris–Roubaix | UCI World Tour | Mathew Hayman (AUS) | France | Roubaix |
| 1 May | Tour de Romandie, Stage 5 | UCI World Tour | Michael Albasini (SUI) | Switzerland | Geneva |
| 1 May | Tour de Romandie, Points classification | UCI World Tour | Michael Albasini (SUI) | Switzerland | |
| 21 May | Giro d'Italia, Stage 14 | UCI World Tour | Esteban Chaves (COL) | Italy | Corvara |
| 16 June | Tour of Slovenia, Stage 1 | UCI Europe Tour | Jens Keukeleire (BEL) | Slovenia | Koper |
| 19 June | Tour of Slovenia, Points classification | UCI Europe Tour | Jack Haig (AUS) | Slovenia | |
| 12 July | Tour de France, Stage 10 | UCI World Tour | Michael Matthews (AUS) | France | Revel |
| 24 July | Tour de France, Young rider classification | UCI World Tour | Adam Yates (GBR) | France | |
| 25 July | Prueba Villafranca de Ordizia | UCI Europe Tour | Simon Yates (GBR) | Spain | Ordizia |
| 21 August | Vattenfall Cyclassics | UCI World Tour | Caleb Ewan (AUS) | Germany | Hamburg |
| 25 August | Vuelta a España, Stage 6 | UCI World Tour | Simon Yates (GBR)} | Spain | Luintra |
| 1 September | Vuelta a España, Stage 12 | UCI World Tour | Jens Keukeleire (BEL) | Spain | Bilbao |
| 8 September | Vuelta a España, Stage 18 | UCI World Tour | Magnus Cort (DEN) | Spain | Gandia |
| 11 September | Vuelta a España, Stage 21 | UCI World Tour | Magnus Cort (DEN) | Spain | Madrid |
| 11 September | Tour of Britain, Stage 8 | UCI Europe Tour | Caleb Ewan (AUS) | United Kingdom | London |
| 24 September | Giro dell'Emilia | UCI Europe Tour | Esteban Chaves (COL) | Italy | Emilia-Romagna |
| 25 September | Duo Normand | UCI Europe Tour | Luke Durbridge (AUS); Svein Tuft (CAN) | France | Marigny-le-Lozon |
| 1 October | Il Lombardia | UCI World Tour | Esteban Chaves (COL) | Italy | Bergamo |

== National, Continental and World champions 2016 ==
| Date | Discipline | Jersey | Rider | Country | Location |
|---|---|---|---|---|---|
| 6 January | Australian National Criterium Championships | | Caleb Ewan (AUS) | Australia | Ballarat |
| 11 February | South African National Time Trial Championships | | Daryl Impey (RSA) | South Africa | Wartburg |
| 25 June | Hong Kong National Time Trial Championships | | Cheung King Lok (HKG) | Hong Kong | Hong Kong |
| 26 June | Hong Kong National Road Race Championships | | Cheung King Lok (HKG) | Hong Kong | Hong Kong |
