= 2016 UCI World Tour =

Road cycling competitions

2016 UCI WorldTour
- Sixth edition of the UCI World Tour

Details
- Dates: 19 January – 1 October
- Location: Australia, Europe and Canada
- Races: 27

Champions
- Individual champion: Peter Sagan (Slovakia) (Tinkoff)
- Teams' champion: Movistar Team
- Nations' champion: Spain

The 2016 UCI World Tour was a competition that included 27 road cycling events throughout the 2016 men's cycling season. It was the eighth edition of the ranking system launched by the Union Cycliste Internationale (UCI) in 2009. The competition started with the opening stage of the Tour Down Under on 19 January, and concluded with Il Lombardia on 1 October. Spain's Alejandro Valverde was the two-times defending champion.

Valverde was unable to defend his title, as he finished fourth in the individual rankings. The title was won for the first time by Slovakian rider Peter Sagan for the Tinkoff team, scoring 669 points over the course of the season. This included victories at Gent–Wevelgem, the Tour of Flanders and the Grand Prix Cycliste de Québec. Second place went to Valverde's Movistar Team team-mate Nairo Quintana, 60 points behind Sagan; Quintana also won three races overall: the Volta a Catalunya, the Tour de Romandie and the season's final Grand Tour, the Vuelta a España. Third place in the individual rankings went to Chris Froome (Team Sky), 45 points behind Quintana and 105 in arrears of Sagan. Froome took two wins on French soil during the World Tour campaign, winning the Critérium du Dauphiné as well as the Tour de France.

Two other sub-classifications were also contested. In the teams' rankings, Movistar Team finished top for the fourth year running, with a total of 1471 points. Second place went to Tinkoff, 110 points behind, while Team Sky finished in third position. The nations' rankings was headed by Spain, with a points advantage of 29 over Colombia, with Great Britain over 400 points adrift of Spain in third place.

== Teams ==
Professional cycling teams were divided into several tiers: the top teams were UCI WorldTeams and were automatically entitled and obliged to enter all World Tour races. The organisers of each race were also permitted to invite other teams – generally UCI Professional Continental teams – to compete alongside the WorldTeams. The UCI selected the teams based on sporting, ethical, financial and administrative criteria. The number of WorldTeams was limited to 18. In October 2015, 17 teams were granted WorldTeam status by the UCI; these were the same teams that competed in the 2015 UCI World Tour. In November, the final WorldTeam licence was awarded to Team Dimension Data, which had previously competed at Professional Continental level as MTN–Qhubeka. There were therefore a total of 18 teams selected for the 2016 World Tour.

As well as the addition of Team Dimension Data, there were two other changes to the team names for the 2016 season. The team that in 2015 had competed as Tinkoff–Saxo lost Saxo Bank as a sponsor and therefore became Tinkoff, while Cannondale–Garmin became Cannondale, although Garmin remained a sponsor of the team. Cannondale later became Cannondale–Drapac and Orica–GreenEDGE became Orica–BikeExchange as a result of mid-season sponsorship agreements.

2016 UCI World Teams and equipment
Code	Official Team Name	Country	Groupset	Road Bike(s)	Time Trial Bike	Wheels
ALM	AG2R La Mondiale (2016 season)	France	SRAM	Focus Izalco Max; Focus Cayo	Focus Izalco Chrono	Zipp
AST	Astana (2016 season)	Kazakhstan	Campagnolo	Specialized Venge; S-Works Tarmac; Specialized Roubaix	Specialized Shiv	Corima
BMC	BMC Racing Team (2016 season)	United States	Shimano	BMC Teammachine SLR01; BMC Timemachine TMR01; BMC Granfondo GF01	BMC TimeMachine TM01	Shimano
CPT	Cannondale–Drapac (2016 season)	United States	Shimano	Cannondale SuperSix EVO; Cannondale Synapse	Cannondale Slice	Mavic
DDD	Team Dimension Data (2016 season)	South Africa	Shimano/Rotor	Cervelo S5; Cervelo R5; Cervelo C5	Cervelo P5	Enve
EQS	Etixx–Quick-Step (2016 season)	Belgium	Shimano; FSA	Specialized Venge; S-Works Tarmac; Specialized Roubaix	Specialized Shiv	Shimano
FDJ	FDJ (2016 season)	France	Shimano	Lapierre Xelius SL; Lapierre AircodeSL; Lapierre Pulsium	Lapierre Aerostorm	Shimano
IAM	IAM Cycling (2016 season)	Switzerland	Shimano	Scott Foil; Scott Addict; Scott Solace	Scott Plasma	DT Swiss
LAM	Lampre–Merida (2016 season)	Italy	Shimano; Rotor	Merida Reacto Evo; Merida Scultura; Merida Ride	Merida Warp	Fulcrum
LTS	Lotto–Soudal (2016 season)	Belgium	Campagnolo	Ridley Helium SL; Ridley Noah SL; Ridley Fenix SL	Ridley Dean Fast	Campagnolo
MOV	Movistar Team (2016 season)	Spain	Campagnolo	Canyon Ultimate CF SLX; Canyon Aeroad CF SLX; Canyon Endurance CF SL	Canyon Speedmax CF	Campagnolo
OGE	Orica–BikeExchange (2016 season)	Australia	Shimano	Scott Foil; Scott Addict; Scott Solace	Scott Plasma	Shimano
TGA	Team Giant–Alpecin (2016 season)	Germany	Shimano	Giant TCR Advanced SL; Giant Propel Advanced SL; Giant Defy Advanced SL	Giant Trinity	Shimano
KAT	Team Katusha (2016 season)	Russia	SRAM	Canyon Ultimate CF SLX; Canyon Aeroad CF SLX; Canyon Endurance CF SL	Canyon Speedmax CF	Zipp
TLJ	LottoNL–Jumbo (2016 season)	Netherlands	Shimano	Bianchi OltreXR2; Bianchi Specialissima; Bianchi Infinito CV	Bianchi Aquila CV	Shimano
SKY	Team Sky (2016 season)	Great Britain	Shimano	Pinarello Dogma F8; Pinarello Dogma K8-S; Pinarello Dogma K8	Pinarello Bolide	Shimano
TNK	Tinkoff (2016 season)	Russia	Shimano	Specialized Venge; S-Works Tarmac; Specialized Roubaix	Specialized Shiv	Roval
TFS	Trek–Segafredo (2016 season)	United States	Shimano	Trek Emonda; Trek Madone; Trek Domane	Trek SpeedConcept	Bontrager

== Events ==
All events from the 2015 UCI World Tour were included, although some events were scheduled on different dates than previous editions. For the 2016 season UCI put forward a new ranking system to run alongside the normal WorldTour rankings. The new World Rankings ran over a 52-week period like the ATP and WTA rankings in tennis.

The team time trial at the UCI World Championships, scheduled to be held on 9 October, had been due to award points towards the team rankings. In August 2016, the Association International des Groupes Cyclistes Professionels (AIGCP) approved a motion for all UCI WorldTeams to boycott the time trial event, due to the UCI insisting that WorldTeams should compete in the event as a requirement of granting a WorldTeam licence without providing a participation allowance to teams, as is the case with other UCI World Tour races. It was reported that the UCI Professional Continental teams attending the AIGCP General Assembly also supported the motion. The UCI expressed disappointment with the move and stated that it "continued to expect excellent participation in this year's UCI Road World Championships Team Time Trial". However a month later, it was announced that WorldTeams would compete in the event, although not compulsory, and no points would be awarded towards the World Tour rankings.

Races in the 2016 UCI World Tour
Race	Date	Winner		Second		Third		Other points (4th place onwards)	Stage points
(Australia) Tour Down Under	19–24 January	Simon Gerrans (AUS)	100 pts	Richie Porte (AUS)	80 pts	Sergio Henao (COL)	70 pts	60, 50, 40, 30, 20, 10, 4	6, 4, 2, 1, 1
(France) Paris–Nice	6–13 March	Geraint Thomas (GBR)	100 pts	Alberto Contador (ESP)	80 pts	Richie Porte (AUS)	70 pts	60, 50, 40, 30, 20, 10, 4	6, 4, 2, 1, 1
(Italy) Tirreno–Adriatico	9–15 March	Greg Van Avermaet (BEL)	100 pts	Peter Sagan (SVK)	80 pts	Bob Jungels (LUX)	70 pts	60, 50, 40, 30, 20, 10, 4	6, 4, 2, 1, 1
(Italy) Milan–San Remo	19 March	Arnaud Démare (FRA)	100 pts	Ben Swift (GBR)	80 pts	Jürgen Roelandts (BEL)	70 pts	60, 50, 40, 30, 20, 10, 4	N/A
(Spain) Volta a Catalunya	21–27 March	Nairo Quintana (COL)	100 pts	Alberto Contador (ESP)	80 pts	Dan Martin (IRL)	70 pts	60, 50, 40, 30, 20, 10, 4	6, 4, 2, 1, 1
(Belgium) E3 Harelbeke	25 March	Michał Kwiatkowski (POL)	80 pts	Peter Sagan (SVK)	60 pts	Ian Stannard (GBR)	50 pts	40, 30, 22, 14, 10, 6, 2	N/A
(Belgium) Gent–Wevelgem	27 March	Peter Sagan (SVK)	80 pts	Sep Vanmarcke (BEL)	60 pts	Vyacheslav Kuznetsov (RUS)	50 pts	40, 30, 22, 14, 10, 6, 2	N/A
(Belgium) Tour of Flanders	3 April	Peter Sagan (SVK)	100 pts	Fabian Cancellara (SUI)	80 pts	Sep Vanmarcke (BEL)	70 pts	60, 50, 40, 30, 20, 10, 4	N/A
(Spain) Tour of the Basque Country	4–9 April	Alberto Contador (ESP)	100 pts	Sergio Henao (COL)	80 pts	Nairo Quintana (COL)	70 pts	60, 50, 40, 30, 20, 10, 4	6, 4, 2, 1, 1
(France) Paris–Roubaix	10 April	Mathew Hayman (AUS)	100 pts	Tom Boonen (BEL)	80 pts	Ian Stannard (GBR)	70 pts	60, 50, 40, 30, 20, 10, 4	N/A
(Netherlands) Amstel Gold Race	17 April	Enrico Gasparotto (ITA)	0 pts (Note: As Gasparotto rode for Wanty–Groupe Gobert, which is not a UCI World Team, he was ineligible to score points towards the UCI World Tour standings.)	Michael Valgren (DEN)	60 pts	Sonny Colbrelli (ITA)	0 pts (Note: As Colbrelli rode for Bardiani–CSF, which is not a UCI World Team, he was ineligible to score points towards the UCI World Tour standings.)	40, 30, 22, 14, 10, 6, 2	N/A
(Belgium) La Flèche Wallonne	20 April	Alejandro Valverde (ESP)	80 pts	Julian Alaphilippe (FRA)	60 pts	Dan Martin (IRL)	50 pts	40, 30, 22, 14, 10, 6, 2	N/A
(Belgium) Liège–Bastogne–Liège	24 April	Wout Poels (NED)	100 pts	Michael Albasini (SUI)	80 pts	Rui Costa (POR)	70 pts	60, 50, 40, 30, 20, 10, 4	N/A
(Switzerland) Tour de Romandie	26 April – 1 May	Nairo Quintana (COL)	100 pts	Thibaut Pinot (FRA)	80 pts	Ion Izagirre (ESP)	70 pts	60, 50, 40, 30, 20, 10, 4	6, 4, 2, 1, 1
(Italy) Giro d'Italia	6–29 May	Vincenzo Nibali (ITA)	170 pts	Esteban Chaves (COL)	130 pts	Alejandro Valverde (ESP)	100 pts	90, 80, 70, 60, 52, 44, 38, 32, 26, 22, 18, 14, 10, 8, 6, 4, 2	16, 8, 4, 2, 1
(France) Critérium du Dauphiné	5–12 June	Chris Froome (GBR)	100 pts	Romain Bardet (FRA)	80 pts	Dan Martin (IRL)	70 pts	60, 50, 40, 30, 20, 10, 4	6, 4, 2, 1, 1
(Switzerland) Tour de Suisse	11–19 June	Miguel Ángel López (COL)	100 pts	Ion Izagirre (ESP)	80 pts	Warren Barguil (FRA)	70 pts	60, 50, 40, 30, 20, 10, 4	6, 4, 2, 1, 1
Tour de France	2–24 July	Chris Froome (GBR)	200 pts	Romain Bardet (FRA)	150 pts	Nairo Quintana (COL)	120 pts	110, 100, 90, 80, 70, 60, 50, 40, 30, 24, 20, 16, 12, 10, 8, 6, 4	20, 10, 6, 4, 2
(Poland) Tour de Pologne	12–18 July	Tim Wellens (BEL)	100 pts	Fabio Felline (ITA)	80 pts	Alberto Bettiol (ITA)	70 pts	60, 50, 40, 30, 20, 10, 4	6, 4, 2, 1, 1
(Spain) Clásica de San Sebastián	30 July	Bauke Mollema (NED)	80 pts	Tony Gallopin (FRA)	60 pts	Alejandro Valverde (ESP)	50 pts	40, 30, 22, 14, 10, 6, 2	N/A
(Spain) Vuelta a España	20 August – 11 September	Nairo Quintana (COL)	170 pts	Chris Froome (GBR)	130 pts	Esteban Chaves (COL)	100 pts	90, 80, 70, 60, 52, 44, 38, 32, 26, 22, 18, 14, 10, 8, 6, 4, 2	16, 8, 4, 2, 1
(Germany) EuroEyes Cyclassics	21 August	Caleb Ewan (AUS)	80 pts	John Degenkolb (DEU)	60 pts	Giacomo Nizzolo (ITA)	50 pts	40, 30, 22, 14, 10, 6, 2	N/A
GP Ouest-France	28 August	Oliver Naesen (BEL)	80 pts	Alberto Bettiol (ITA)	60 pts	Alexander Kristoff (NOR)	50 pts	40, 30, 22, 14, 10, 6, 2	N/A
(Canada) GP de Québec	9 September	Peter Sagan (SVK)	80 pts	Greg Van Avermaet (BEL)	60 pts	Anthony Roux (FRA)	50 pts	40, 30, 22, 14, 10, 6, 2	N/A
(Canada) GP de Montréal	11 September	Greg Van Avermaet (BEL)	80 pts	Peter Sagan (SVK)	60 pts	Diego Ulissi (ITA)	50 pts	40, 30, 22, 14, 10, 6, 2	N/A
(Belgium) / (Netherlands) Eneco Tour	19–25 September	Niki Terpstra (NED)	100 pts	Oliver Naesen (BEL)	80 pts	Peter Sagan (SVK)	70 pts	60, 50, 40, 30, 20, 10, 4	6, 4, 2, 1, 1
(Italy) Il Lombardia	1 October	Esteban Chaves (COL)	100 pts	Diego Rosa (ITA)	80 pts	Rigoberto Urán (COL)	70 pts	60, 50, 40, 30, 20, 10, 4	N/A

== Final points standings ==
=== Individual ===
Riders tied with the same number of points were classified by number of victories, then number of second places, third places, and so on, in World Tour events and stages.

Rank	Name	Team	Points
1	Peter Sagan (SVK)	Tinkoff	669
2	Nairo Quintana (COL)	Movistar Team	609
3	Chris Froome (GBR)	Team Sky	564
4	Alejandro Valverde (ESP)	Movistar Team	436
5	Alberto Contador (ESP)	Tinkoff	428
6	Greg Van Avermaet (BEL)	BMC Racing Team	420
7	Richie Porte (AUS)	BMC Racing Team	394
8	Romain Bardet (FRA)	AG2R La Mondiale	374
9	Esteban Chaves (COL)	Orica–BikeExchange	351
10	Dan Martin (IRL)	Etixx–Quick-Step	280
11	Ion Izagirre (ESP)	Movistar Team	270
12	Vincenzo Nibali (ITA)	Astana	241
13	Ilnur Zakarin (RUS)	Team Katusha	239
14	Sergio Henao (COL)	Team Sky	234
15	Alexander Kristoff (NOR)	Team Katusha	229
16	Joaquim Rodríguez (ESP)	Team Katusha	211
17	Thibaut Pinot (FRA)	FDJ	206
18	Sep Vanmarcke (BEL)	LottoNL–Jumbo	201
19	Rui Costa (POR)	Lampre–Merida	194
20	Alberto Bettiol (ITA)	Cannondale–Drapac	185
21	Michael Matthews (AUS)	Orica–BikeExchange	184
22	Fabian Cancellara (SUI)	Trek–Segafredo	176
23	Oliver Naesen (BEL)	IAM Cycling	162
24	Bauke Mollema (NED)	Trek–Segafredo	160
25	Arnaud Démare (FRA)	FDJ	154

- 235 riders scored points. 34 other riders finished in positions that would have earned them points, but they were ineligible as they were not members of a WorldTeam.

=== Team ===
Team rankings were calculated by adding the ranking points of the top five riders of a team in the table.

Rank	Team	Points	Top 5 riders
1	Movistar Team	1471	N. Quintana (609), Valverde (436), I. Izagirre (270), Fernández (88), Amador (68)
2	Tinkoff	1361	P. Sagan (669), Contador (428), Majka (110), Kreuziger (86), McCarthy (68)
3	Team Sky	1187	Froome (564), Ser. Henao (234), Poels (148), Thomas (121), Stannard (120)
4	BMC Racing Team	1128	Van Avermaet (420), Porte (394), S. Sánchez (130), van Garderen (104), Atapuma (80)
5	Orica–BikeExchange	909	Chaves (351), Matthews (184), A. Yates (144), Gerrans (119), Ewan (111)
6	Team Katusha	789	Zakarin (239), Kristoff (229), Rodríguez (211), Špilak (60), Kuznetsov (50)
7	Etixx–Quick-Step	775	D. Martin (280), Jungels (153), Alaphilippe (146), Terpstra (108), Štybar (88)
8	Cannondale–Drapac	616	Bettiol (185), Urán (137), Talansky (132), Formolo (108), Villella (54)
9	Trek–Segafredo	565	Cancellara (176), Mollema (160), Felline (108), Nizzolo (90), Stuyven (31)
10	Astana	539	Nibali (241), Rosa (110), M. López (109), Scarponi (43), Aru (36)
11	FDJ	516	Pinot (206), Démare (154), Reichenbach (84), Roux (56), Geniez (16)
12	LottoNL–Jumbo	506	Vanmarcke (201), Kruijswijk (118), Kelderman (74), Gesink (59), van Emden (54)
13	AG2R La Mondiale	482	Bardet (374), Pozzovivo (32), Dupont (32), Latour (22), Péraud (22)
14	Lotto–Soudal	463	Wellens (130), Greipel (92), Roelandts (90), Gallopin (85), Benoot (66)
15	Lampre–Merida	442	R. Costa (194), Ulissi (129), Meintjes (85), Modolo (18), Conti (16)
16	Team Giant–Alpecin	435	T. Dumoulin (149), Barguil (144), Degenkolb (98), Arndt (38), T. Ludvigsson (6)
17	IAM Cycling	418	Naesen (162), Pantano (115), Haussler (72), Frank (39), Warbasse (30)
18	Team Dimension Data	290	Cavendish (80), Boasson Hagen (79), Haas (53), Sivtsov (40), Cummings (38)

=== Nation ===
National rankings were calculated by adding the ranking points of the top five riders registered in a nation in the table. The national rankings were also used to determine how many riders a country could have in the World Championships.

Rank	Nation	Points	Top 5 riders (if applicable)
1	Spain	1475	Valverde (436), Contador (428), I. Izagirre (270), Rodríguez (211), S. Sánchez (130)
2	Colombia	1446	N. Quintana (609), Chaves (351), Ser. Henao (234), Urán (137), Pantano (115)
3	Great Britain	1050	Froome (564), A. Yates (144), Thomas (121), Stannard (120), S. Yates (101) (Note: After his positive test for the banned substance terbutaline in an in-competition test during Paris–Nice, Yates was disqualified from his seventh place finish overall, and lost the 30 points awarded.)
4	France	1024	Bardet (374), Pinot (206), Démare (154), Alaphilippe (146), Barguil (144)
5	Belgium	1003	Van Avermaet (420), Vanmarcke (201), Naesen (162), Wellens (130), Roelandts (90)
6	Australia	908	Porte (394), Matthews (184), Gerrans (119), Ewan (111), Hayman (100)
7	Italy	773	Nibali (241), Bettiol (185), Ulissi (129), Rosa (110), Felline (108)
8	Netherlands	683	Mollema (160), T. Dumoulin (149), Poels (148), Kruijswijk (118), Terpstra (108)
9	Slovakia	669	P. Sagan (669)
10	Switzerland	416	Cancellara (176), Albasini (106), Reichenbach (84), Frank (39), Morabito (11)
11	Norway	343	Kristoff (229), Boasson Hagen (79), Holst Enger (16), Hoelgaard (14), Stake Laengen (5)
12	Germany	339	Degenkolb (98), Greipel (92), Kittel (81), Arndt (38), Sieberg (30)
13	Russia	336	Zakarin (239), Kuznetsov (50), Lagutin (20), Silin (18), Tsatevich (9)
14	Ireland	286	D. Martin (280), Roche (6)
15	United States	280	Talansky (132), van Garderen (104), Warbasse (30), Craddock (10), Dombrowski (4)

- Riders from 35 nations scored points.

== Leader progress ==
Event (Winner)	Top Individual	Top Team	Top Nation
Tour Down Under (Simon Gerrans)	Simon Gerrans	Orica–GreenEDGE	Australia
Paris–Nice (Geraint Thomas)	Richie Porte	Team Sky	Australia
Tirreno–Adriatico (Greg Van Avermaet)	Richie Porte	BMC Racing Team	Australia
Milan–San Remo (Arnaud Démare)	Richie Porte	Team Sky	Australia
E3 Harelbeke (Michał Kwiatkowski)	Richie Porte	Team Sky	Australia
Volta a Catalunya (Nairo Quintana)	Richie Porte	Team Sky	Australia
Gent–Wevelgem (Peter Sagan)	Peter Sagan	Tinkoff	Australia
Tour of Flanders (Peter Sagan)	Peter Sagan	Tinkoff	Australia
Tour of the Basque Country (Alberto Contador)	Peter Sagan	Tinkoff	Spain
Paris–Roubaix (Mathew Hayman)	Peter Sagan	Tinkoff	Australia
Amstel Gold Race (Enrico Gasparotto)	Peter Sagan	Tinkoff	Australia
La Flèche Wallonne (Alejandro Valverde)	Peter Sagan	Tinkoff	Australia
Liège–Bastogne–Liège (Wout Poels)	Peter Sagan	Tinkoff	Spain
Tour de Romandie (Nairo Quintana)	Peter Sagan	Tinkoff	Spain
Giro d'Italia (Vincenzo Nibali)	Peter Sagan	Tinkoff	Spain
Critérium du Dauphiné (Chris Froome)	Alberto Contador	Tinkoff	Spain
Tour de Suisse (Miguel Ángel López)	Peter Sagan	Tinkoff	Spain
Tour de Pologne (Tim Wellens)	Peter Sagan	Tinkoff	Spain
Tour de France (Chris Froome)	Peter Sagan	Movistar Team	Spain
Clásica de San Sebastián (Bauke Mollema)	Peter Sagan	Movistar Team	Spain
EuroEyes Cyclassics (Caleb Ewan)	Peter Sagan	Movistar Team	Spain
GP Ouest-France (Oliver Naesen)	Peter Sagan	Movistar Team	Spain
Grand Prix Cycliste de Québec (Peter Sagan)	Peter Sagan	Movistar Team	Spain
Vuelta a España (Nairo Quintana)	Nairo Quintana	Movistar Team	Spain
Grand Prix Cycliste de Montréal (Greg Van Avermaet)	Nairo Quintana	Movistar Team	Spain
Eneco Tour (Niki Terpstra)	Peter Sagan	Movistar Team	Spain
Il Lombardia (Esteban Chaves)	Peter Sagan	Movistar Team	Spain
