= 2016 AG2R La Mondiale season =

AG2R La Mondiale
- 2016 season
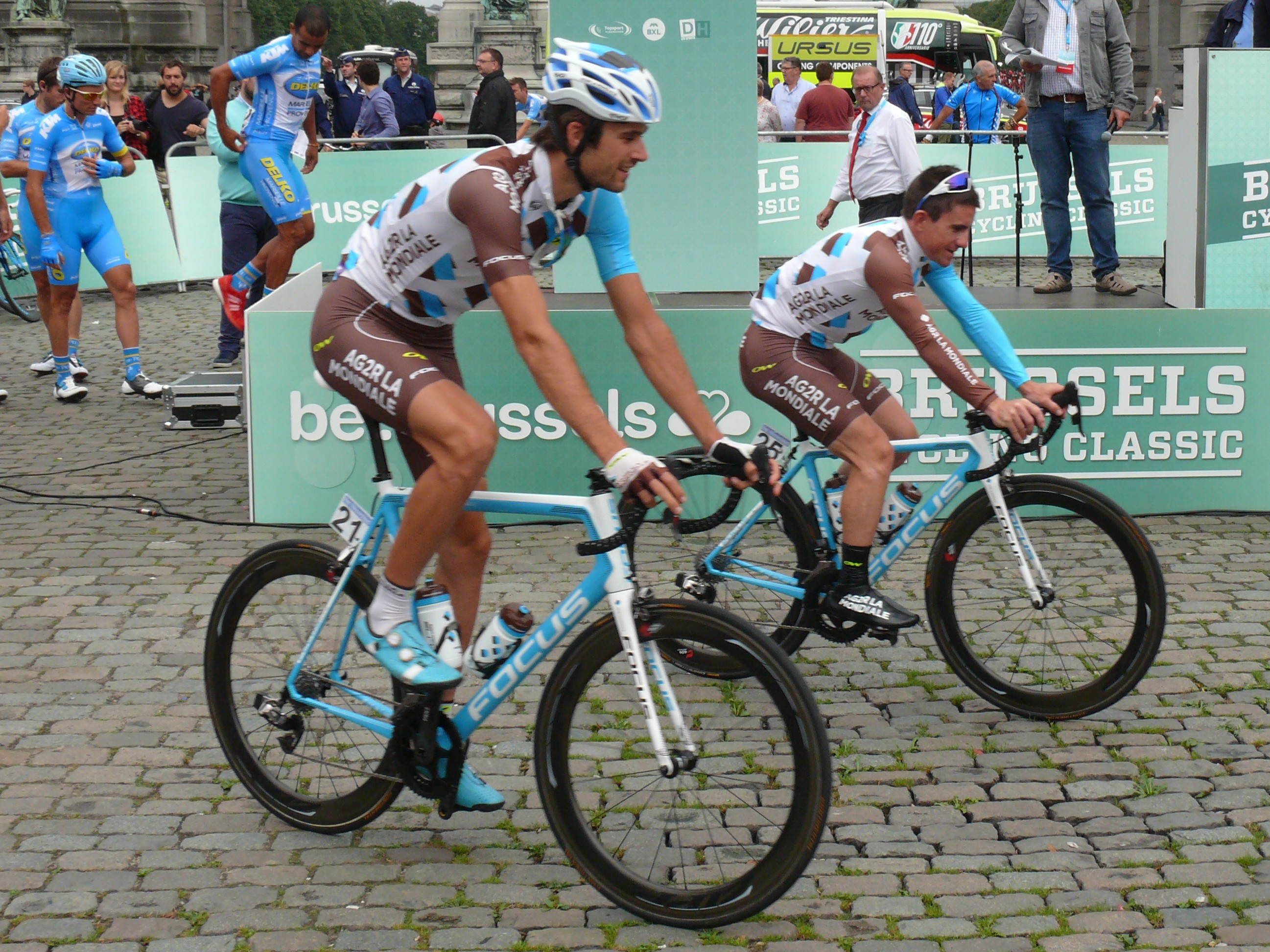
- Ben Gastauer and Samuel Dumoulin on 2016 Brussels Cycling Classic
- UCI code: ALM
- Status: UCI ProTeam
- Manager: Vincent Lavenu
- Main sponsor(s): AG2R Group & La Mondiale Group
- Based: France
- Bicycles: Focus Bikes
- Groupset: SRAM

Season victories
- One-day races: 5
- Stage race overall: 0
- Stage race stages: 3
- Jersey

The 2016 season for the AG2R La Mondiale cycling team began in January at the Tour de San Luis. As a UCI WorldTeam, they were automatically invited and obligated to send a squad to every event in the UCI World Tour.

== Team roster ==
Rider	Date of birth
Gediminas Bagdonas (LTU)	26 December 1985 (aged 30)
Jan Bakelants (BEL)	14 February 1986 (aged 29)
Romain Bardet (FRA)	9 November 1990 (aged 25)
Julien Bérard (FRA)	2 July 1987 (aged 28)
François Bidard (FRA)	12 March 1992 (aged 23)
Guillaume Bonnafond (FRA)	23 June 1987 (aged 28)
Mikaël Cherel (FRA)	17 March 1986 (aged 29)
Benoît Cosnefroy (Note: Cosnefroy joined the team on 1 August as a stagiaire, from Chambéry CF.) (FRA)	17 October 1995 (aged 20)
Maxime Daniel (FRA)	5 June 1991 (aged 24)
Nico Denz (GER)	15 February 1994 (aged 21)
Axel Domont (FRA)	7 August 1990 (aged 25)
Samuel Dumoulin (FRA)	20 August 1980 (aged 35)
Hubert Dupont (FRA)	13 November 1980 (aged 35)
Étienne Fabre (Note: Fabre joined the team on 1 August as a stagiaire, from Chambéry CF.) (FRA)	5 August 1996 (aged 19)
Ben Gastauer (LUX)	14 November 1987 (aged 28)
Damien Gaudin (FRA)	20 August 1986 (aged 29)
Cyril Gautier (FRA)	26 September 1987 (aged 28)

Rider	Date of birth
Alexis Gougeard (FRA)	5 March 1993 (aged 22)
Patrick Gretsch (GER)	7 April 1987 (aged 28)
Hugo Houle (CAN)	27 September 1990 (aged 25)
Quentin Jaurégui (FRA)	22 April 1994 (aged 21)
Blel Kadri (FRA)	3 September 1986 (aged 29)
Pierre-Roger Latour (FRA)	12 October 1993 (aged 22)
Sébastien Minard (FRA)	12 June 1982 (aged 33)
Matteo Montaguti (ITA)	6 January 1984 (aged 32)
Jean-Christophe Péraud (FRA)	22 May 1977 (aged 38)
Domenico Pozzovivo (ITA)	30 November 1982 (aged 33)
Christophe Riblon (FRA)	17 January 1981 (aged 34)
Rémy Rochas (Note: Rochas joined the team on 1 August as a stagiaire, from Chambéry CF.) (FRA)	18 May 1996 (aged 19)
Jesse Sergent (Note: Sergent retired from cycling on July 22.) (NZL)	8 July 1988 (aged 27)
Sébastien Turgot (FRA)	11 April 1984 (aged 31)
Johan Vansummeren (Note: Vansummeren retired from cycling on June 29.) (BEL)	4 February 1981 (aged 34)
Alexis Vuillermoz (FRA)	1 June 1988 (aged 27)

Riders who joined the team for the 2016 season

Rider	2015 team
François Bidard	neo-pro (Chambéry Formation)
Cyril Gautier	Team Europcar
Jesse Sergent	Trek Factory Racing

Riders who left the team during or after the 2015 season

Rider	2016 team
Carlos Betancur	Movistar Team
Lloyd Mondory	prov. suspended
Rinaldo Nocentini	Sporting Clube de Portugal/Tavira

== Season victories ==
Date	Race	Competition	Rider	Country	Location
7 February	Étoile de Bessèges, Young rider classification	UCI Europe Tour	Pierre Latour (FRA)	France	
14 February	La Méditerranéenne, Stage 4	UCI Europe Tour	Jan Bakelants (BEL)	France	Bordighera
14 February	La Méditerranéenne, Points classification	UCI Europe Tour	Jan Bakelants (BEL)	France	
14 February	La Méditerranéenne, Mountains classification	UCI Europe Tour	Cyril Gautier (FRA)	France	
14 February	La Méditerranéenne, Teams classification	UCI Europe Tour	(Note: The riders on the squad were Alexis Vuillermoz, Ben Gastauer, Cyril Gautier, Mikaël Cherel, Julien Bérard, Axel Domont, Christophe Riblon and Jan Bakelants)	France	
21 February	Tour du Haut Var, Mountains classification	UCI Europe Tour	Ben Gastauer (LUX)	France	
27 March	Critérium International, Young rider classification	UCI Europe Tour	Pierre Latour (FRA)	France	
3 April	Paris–Camembert	UCI Europe Tour	Cyril Gautier (FRA)	France	Vimoutiers
22 April	Giro del Trentino, Teams classification	UCI Europe Tour	(Note: The riders on the squad were Romain Bardet, Julien Bérard, Axel Domont, Hubert Dupont, Guillaume Bonnafond, Blel Kadri, Jean-Christophe Péraud and Domenico Pozzovivo)	Italy	
24 April	La Roue Tourangelle	UCI Europe Tour	Samuel Dumoulin (FRA)	France	Tours
1 May	Tour de Romandie, Young rider classification	UCI World Tour	Pierre Latour (FRA)	Switzerland	
28 May	Grand Prix de Plumelec-Morbihan	UCI Europe Tour	Samuel Dumoulin (FRA)	France	Plumelec
29 May	Boucles de l'Aulne	UCI Europe Tour	Samuel Dumoulin (FRA)	France	Châteaulin
19 June	Route du Sud, Mountains classification	UCI Europe Tour	Quentin Jaurégui (FRA)	France	
22 July	Tour de France, Stage 19	UCI World Tour	Romain Bardet (FRA)	France	Saint-Gervais-les-Bains
10 September	Vuelta a España, Stage 20	UCI World Tour	Pierre Latour (FRA)	Spain	Aitana
11 September	Tour du Doubs	UCI Europe Tour	Samuel Dumoulin (FRA)	France	Pontarlier
