= 2016 Grand Prix Cycliste de Québec =

2016 Grand Prix Cycliste de Quebec
2016 UCI World Tour
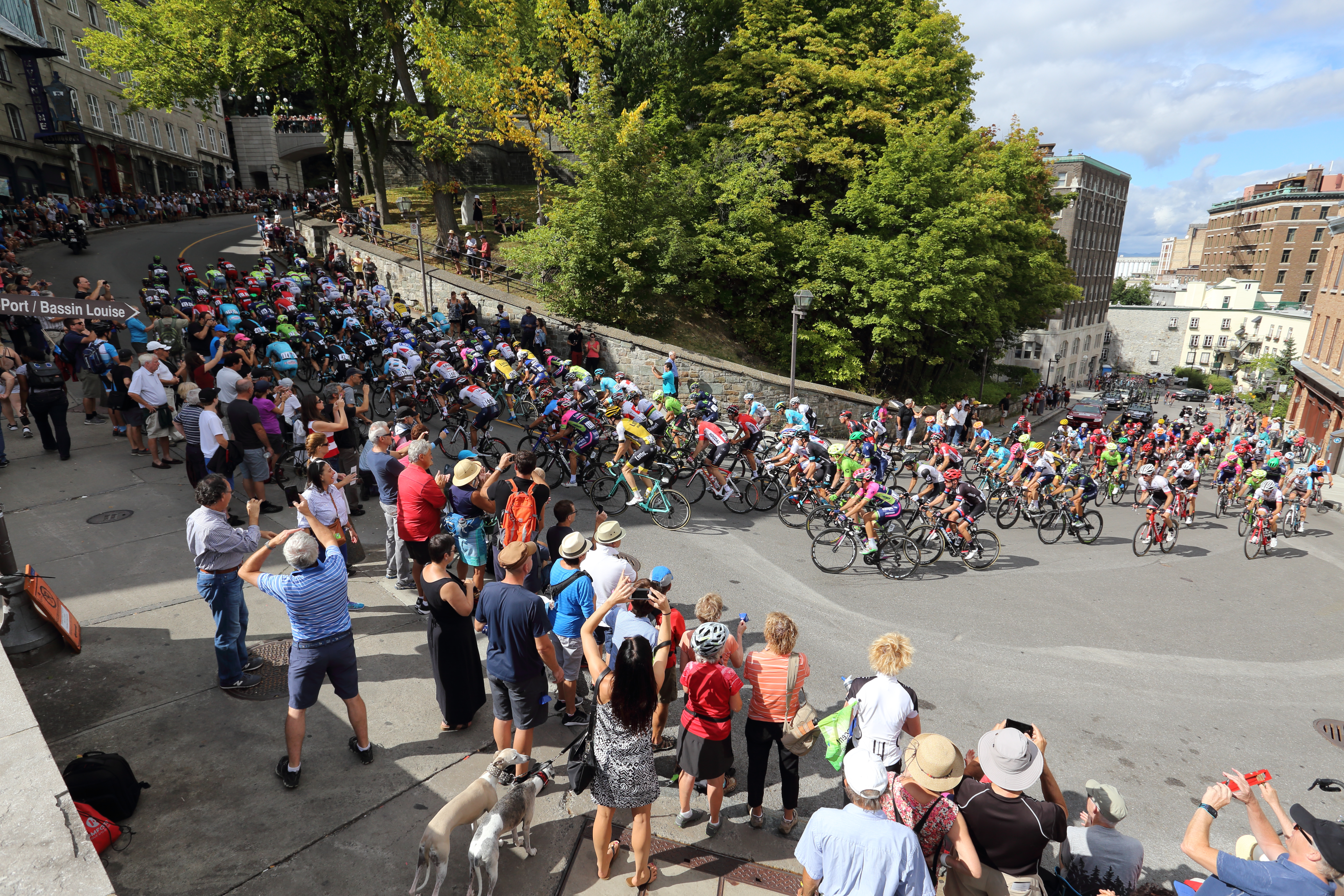
- Climbing côte de la Montagne

Race details
- Dates: 9 September 2016
- Stages: 1
- Winning time: 5h 07' 13"

Results
	Winner	Peter Sagan (SVK)	(Tinkoff)
	Second	Greg Van Avermaet (BEL)	(BMC Racing Team)
	Third	Anthony Roux (FRA)	(FDJ)

The 2016 Grand Prix Cycliste de Québec is the 7th edition of the Grand Prix Cycliste de Québec road bicycle race. The race took place on 9 September 2016, and was won by Peter Sagan in the sprint before Greg Van Avermaet and Anthony Roux.

== Teams ==
The 18 UCI World Tour teams are automatically entitled and obliged to start the race. The race organisation gave out two wildcards to UCI Professional Continental teams.

World Tour teams

- AG2R La Mondiale
- Astana
- BMC Racing Team
- Team Dimension Data
- Etixx–Quick-Step
- FDJ
- IAM Cycling
- Lampre–Merida
- Lotto–Soudal
- Movistar Team
- Team Giant–Alpecin
- Team Katusha
- LottoNL–Jumbo
- Team Sky
- Tinkoff
- Trek–Segafredo
- Cannondale–Drapac
- Orica–BikeExchange

Professional Continental teams

- Direct Énergie
- Bora–Argon 18

National teams

- Canada

== Results ==
	Cyclist	Team	Time	UCI World Tour Points
1	Peter Sagan (SVK)	Tinkoff	5h 07' 13"	80
2	Greg Van Avermaet (BEL)	BMC Racing Team	s.t.	60
3	Anthony Roux (FRA)	FDJ	s.t.	50
4	Alberto Bettiol (ITA)	Cannondale–Drapac	s.t.	40
5	Michael Matthews (AUS)	Orica–BikeExchange	s.t.	30
6	Nathan Haas (AUS)	Team Dimension Data	s.t.	22
7	Diego Ulissi (ITA)	Lampre–Merida	s.t.	14
8	Bauke Mollema (NED)	Trek–Segafredo	s.t.	10
9	Petr Vakoc (CZE)	Etixx–Quick-Step	s.t.	6
10	Rigoberto Urán (COL)	Cannondale–Drapac	s.t.	2
