= 2016 Team LottoNL–Jumbo season =

Team LottoNL–Jumbo
- 2016 season
- Status: UCI ProTeam
- Manager: Richard Plugge
- Main sponsor(s): Jumbo & Staatsloterij
- Based: Netherlands
- Bicycles: Bianchi
- Groupset: Shimano

Season victories
- One-day races: 4
- Stage race overall: 1
- Stage race stages: 10
- National Championships: 3
- Jersey

The 2016 season for the LottoNL–Jumbo road cycling team began in January at the Tour Down Under. As a UCI WorldTeam, they were automatically invited and obligated to send a squad to every event in the UCI World Tour.

== Team roster ==
As of 2016

Rider	Date of birth
Enrico Battaglin (ITA)	17 November 1989 (aged 26)
George Bennett (NZL)	7 April 1990 (aged 25)
Koen Bouwman (NED)	2 December 1993 (aged 22)
Victor Campenaerts (BEL)	28 October 1991 (aged 24)
Twan Castelijns (NED)	23 January 1989 (aged 27)
Robert Gesink (NED)	31 May 1986 (aged 29)
Marc Goos (NED)	30 November 1990 (aged 25)
Dylan Groenewegen (NED)	21 June 1993 (aged 22)
Moreno Hofland (NED)	31 August 1991 (aged 24)
Zhi Hui Jiang (Note: Jiang joined the team on 1 August as a stagiaire, from SEG Racing Academy.) (CHN)	3 March 1994 (aged 21)
Martijn Keizer (NED)	25 March 1988 (aged 27)
Wilco Kelderman (NED)	25 March 1991 (aged 24)
Steven Kruijswijk (NED)	7 June 1987 (aged 28)
Steven Lammertink (NED)	4 December 1993 (aged 22)
Tom Leezer (NED)	26 December 1985 (aged 30)

Rider	Date of birth
Bert-Jan Lindeman (NED)	16 June 1989 (aged 26)
Paul Martens (GER)	26 October 1983 (aged 32)
Primož Roglič (SLO)	29 October 1989 (aged 26)
Timo Roosen (NED)	11 January 1993 (aged 23)
Bram Tankink (NED)	3 December 1978 (aged 37)
Mike Teunissen (NED)	25 August 1992 (aged 23)
Maarten Tjallingii (NED)	5 November 1977 (aged 38)
Tom Van Asbroeck (BEL)	19 April 1990 (aged 25)
Jos van Emden (NED)	27 June 1985 (aged 30)
Sep Vanmarcke (BEL)	28 July 1988 (aged 27)
Dennis van Winden (NED)	2 December 1987 (aged 28)
Alexey Vermeulen (USA)	16 December 1994 (aged 21)
Robert Wagner (GER)	17 April 1983 (aged 32)
Maarten Wynants (BEL)	13 May 1982 (aged 33)

Riders who joined the team for the 2016 season

Rider	2015 team
Enrico Battaglin	Bardiani–CSF
Koen Bouwman	neo-pro (SEG Racing)
Victor Campenaerts	Topsport Vlaanderen–Baloise
Twan Castelijns	neo-pro (BabyDump CT)
Dylan Groenewegen	Team Roompot
Steven Lammertink	neo-pro (SEG Racing)
Primož Roglič	neo-pro (Adria Mobil)
Dennis van Winden	Synergy Baku
Alexey Vermeulen	neo-pro (BMC Development)

Riders who left the team during or after the 2015 season

Rider	2016 team
Brian Bulgaç	Team Vorarlberg
Kevin De Weert	Retired
Rick Flens	
Barry Markus	Roompot–Oranje Peloton
Laurens ten Dam	Team Giant–Alpecin
Nick van der Lijke	Roompot–Oranje Peloton

== Season victories ==
Date	Race	Competition	Rider	Country	Location
5 February	Volta a la Comunitat Valenciana, Stage 3	UCI Europe Tour	Dylan Groenewegen (NED)	Spain	Alzira
5 March	Three Days of West Flanders, Stage 1	UCI Europe Tour	Dylan Groenewegen (NED)	Belgium	Harelbeke
29 April	Tour de Yorkshire, Stage 1	UCI Europe Tour	Dylan Groenewegen (NED)	United Kingdom	Settle
29 April	Tour de Yorkshire, Points Classification	UCI Europe Tour	Dylan Groenewegen (NED)	United Kingdom	
15 May	Giro d'Italia, Stage 9	UCI World Tour	Primož Roglič (SLO)	Italy	Greve in Chianti
4 June	Heistse Pijl	UCI Europe Tour	Dylan Groenewegen (NED)	Belgium	Heist-op-den-Berg
12 June	Rund um Köln	UCI Europe Tour	Dylan Groenewegen (NED)	Germany	Köln
15 June	Ster ZLM Toer, Stage 1	UCI Europe Tour	Jos van Emden (NED)	Netherlands	Goes
17 June	Ster ZLM Toer, Stage 3	UCI Europe Tour	Dylan Groenewegen (NED)	Netherlands	Buchten
18 June	Ster ZLM Toer, Stage 4	UCI Europe Tour	Sep Vanmarcke (BEL)	Belgium	Jalhay
19 June	Ster ZLM Toer, Overall	UCI Europe Tour	Sep Vanmarcke (BEL)	Netherlands	
19 June	Ster ZLM Toer, Points classification	UCI Europe Tour	Dylan Groenewegen (NED)	Netherlands	
19 June	Ster ZLM Toer, Team classification	UCI Europe Tour	(Note: The riders on the squad were Jos van Emden, Sep Vanmarcke, Dylan Groenewegen, Robert Wagner, Maarten Tjallingii, Timo Roosen, Tom Leezer and Maarten Wynants)	Netherlands	
14 August	Arctic Race of Norway, Mountains classification	UCI Europe Tour	Tom Van Asbroeck (BEL)	Norway	
14 August	Arnhem–Veenendaal Classic	UCI Europe Tour	Dylan Groenewegen (NED)	Netherlands	Veenendaal
24 August	Tour du Poitou-Charentes, Stage 2	UCI Europe Tour	Tom Van Asbroeck (BEL)	France	Niort
26 August	Tour du Poitou-Charentes, Points classification	UCI Europe Tour	Tom Van Asbroeck (BEL)	France	
26 August	Tour du Poitou-Charentes, Young rider classification	UCI Europe Tour	Wilco Kelderman (NED)	France	
26 August	Tour du Poitou-Charentes, Team classification	UCI Europe Tour	(Note: The riders on the squad were Sep Vanmarcke, Tom Van Asbroeck, Twan Castelijns, Wilco Kelderman, Bert-Jan Lindeman, Primož Roglič, Robert Wagner and Dennis van Winden)	France	
7 September	Tour of Britain, Stage 4	UCI Europe Tour	Dylan Groenewegen (NED)	United Kingdom	Builth Wells
11 September	Tour of Britain, Points classification	UCI Europe Tour	Dylan Groenewegen (NED)	United Kingdom	
19 September	Eneco Tour, Stage 1	UCI World Tour	Dylan Groenewegen (NED)	Netherlands	Bolsward
2 October	Tour de l'Eurométropole	UCI Europe Tour	Dylan Groenewegen (NED)	Belgium	Tournai

== National, Continental and World champions 2016 ==
Date	Discipline	Jersey	Rider	Country	Location
10 June	Slovenian National Time Trial Champion		Primož Roglič (SLO)	Slovenia	Ljubljana
23 June	Belgian National Time Trial Champion		Victor Campenaerts (BEL)	Belgium	Mol-Postel
25 June	Dutch National Road Race Champion		Dylan Groenewegen (NED)	Netherlands	Ouddorp
