= 2016 Grand Prix Cycliste de Montréal =

2016 Grand Prix Cycliste de Montreal
2016 UCI World Tour
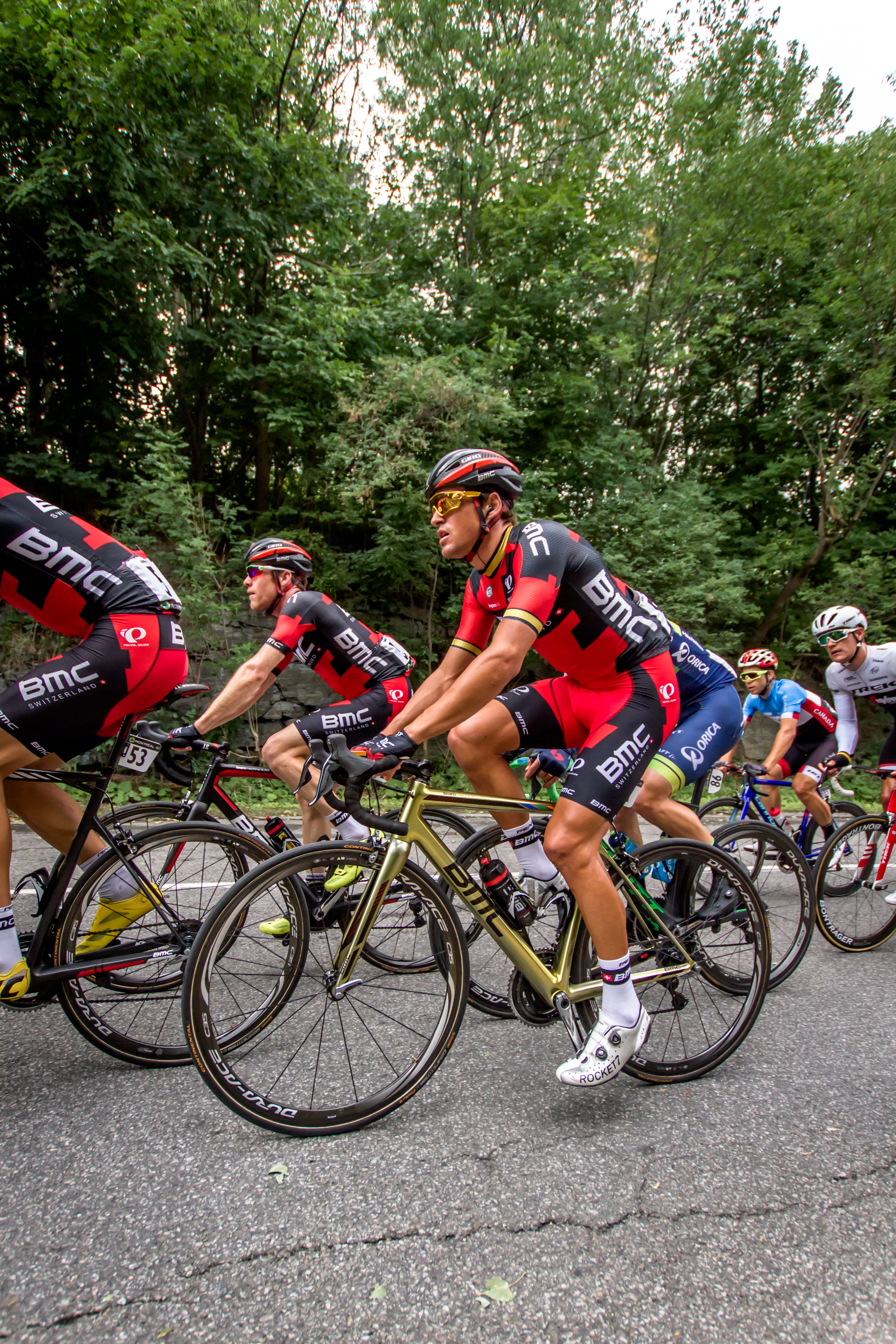
- Race winner Greg Van Avermaet during the race, riding a gold bike

Race details
- Dates: 11 September 2016
- Stages: 1
- Winning time: 5h 27' 05"

Results
	Winner	Greg Van Avermaet (BEL)	(BMC Racing Team)
	Second	Peter Sagan (SVK)	(Tinkoff)
	Third	Diego Ulissi (ITA)	(Lampre–Merida)

The 2016 Grand Prix Cycliste de Montreal was the 7th edition of the Grand Prix Cycliste de Montreal road bicycle race. The race took place on 11 September 2016. The race was won by Belgian rider Greg Van Avermaet of BMC Racing Team in a sprint finish.

== Teams ==
The eighteen UCI World Tour teams are automatically entitled and obliged to start the race. The race organisation gave out a few wildcards to some UCI Professional Continental teams.

World Tour teams

- AG2R La Mondiale
- Astana
- BMC Racing Team
- Team Dimension Data
- Etixx–Quick-Step
- FDJ
- IAM Cycling
- Lampre–Merida
- Lotto–Soudal
- Movistar Team
- Team Giant–Alpecin
- Team Katusha
- LottoNL–Jumbo
- Team Sky
- Tinkoff
- Trek–Segafredo
- Cannondale–Drapac
- Orica–BikeExchange

Professional Continental teams

- Direct Énergie
- Bora–Argon 18

National teams

- Canada

== Results ==
	Cyclist	Team	Time	UCI World Tour Points
1	Greg Van Avermaet (BEL)	BMC Racing Team	5h 27' 04"	80
2	Peter Sagan (SVK)	Tinkoff	s.t.	60
3	Diego Ulissi (ITA)	Lampre–Merida	s.t.	50
4	Michael Matthews (AUS)	Orica–BikeExchange	s.t.	40
5	Nathan Haas (AUS)	Team Dimension Data	s.t.	30
6	Gianni Moscon (ITA)	Team Sky	s.t.	22
7	Alberto Bettiol (ITA)	Cannondale–Drapac	s.t.	14
8	Jon Izaguirre (ESP)	Movistar Team	s.t.	10
9	Anthony Roux (FRA)	FDJ	s.t.	6
10	Julian Alaphilippe (FRA)	Etixx–Quick-Step	s.t.	2
