= 2016 Il Lombardia =

2016 UCI World Tour, race 27 of 27
- Official event poster

Race details
- Dates: 1 October 2016
- Stages: 1
- Distance: 241 km (150 mi)
- Winning time: 6h 26' 36"

Results
	Winner	Esteban Chaves (COL)	(Orica–BikeExchange)
	Second	Diego Rosa (ITA)	(Astana)
	Third	Rigoberto Urán (COL)	(Cannondale–Drapac)

The 2016 Il Lombardia (also known as the Giro di Lombardia or the Tour of Lombardy) took place in Lombardy in Northern Italy on 1 October 2016. It was the 110th edition of the Il Lombardia road bicycle race and the closing event of the 2016 UCI World Tour.

Colombian rider Esteban Chaves won the race in a three-man sprint in Bergamo with Italian Diego Rosa and his countryman Rigoberto Urán.

== Teams ==
The 18 UCI World Tour teams were automatically invited and obliged to line up. The race organisation invited seven further UCI Professional Continental teams with wildcards. Each team had a maximum of eight riders:

UCI WorldTeams

- AG2R La Mondiale
- FDJ
- Team Katusha
- Lotto–Soudal
- Team Sky
- Astana
- Team Dimension Data
- Team Giant–Alpecin
- Lampre–Merida
- Movistar Team
- Tinkoff
- BMC Racing Team
- Etixx–Quick-Step
- IAM Cycling
- LottoNL–Jumbo
- Trek–Segafredo
- Cannondale–Drapac
- Orica–BikeExchange

UCI Professional Continental teams

- Androni Giocattoli–Sidermec
- Cofidis
- Bardiani–CSF
- Gazprom–RusVelo
- CCC–Sprandi–Polkowice
- Nippo–Vini Fantini
- Wilier Triestina–Southeast

== Results ==
Result
Rank	Rider	Team	Time
1	Esteban Chaves (COL)	Orica–BikeExchange	6h 26' 36"
2	Diego Rosa (ITA)	Astana	s.t.
3	Rigoberto Urán (COL)	Cannondale–Drapac	s.t.
4	Romain Bardet (FRA)	AG2R La Mondiale	+ 6"
5	Davide Villella (ITA)	Cannondale–Drapac	+ 1' 19"
6	Alejandro Valverde (ESP)	Movistar Team	+ 1' 24"
7	Robert Gesink (NED)	LottoNL–Jumbo	+ 1' 24"
8	Warren Barguil (FRA)	Team Giant–Alpecin	+ 1' 24"
9	Alessandro De Marchi (ITA)	BMC Racing Team	+ 1' 24"
10	Pierre Latour (FRA)	AG2R La Mondiale	+ 1' 24"
