= 2016 UCI America Tour =

Bicycling competition

- Twelfth edition of the UCI America Tour

Details
- Dates: January 8, 2016–October 2, 2016
- Location: North America and South America
- Races: 24

Champions
- Individual champion: Greg Van Avermaet (BEL) (BMC Racing Team)
- Teams' champion: Holowesko Citadel Racing Team
- Nations' champion: Colombia

The 2016 UCI America Tour was the twelfth season for the UCI America Tour. The season began on January 8, 2016 with the Vuelta al Táchira and ended on October 2, 2016, with the Tobago Cycling Classic.

The points leader, based on the cumulative results of previous races, wears the UCI America Tour cycling jersey. Throughout the season, points are awarded to the top finishers of stages within stage races and the final general classification standings of each of the stages races and one-day events. The quality and complexity of a race also determines how many points are awarded to the top finishers, the higher the UCI rating of a race, the more points are awarded.

The UCI ratings from highest to lowest are as follows:

- Multi-day events: 2.HC, 2.1 and 2.2
- One-day events: 1.HC, 1.1 and 1.2

== Events ==
Date	Race Name	Location	UCI Rating	Winner	Team	Ref
January 8–17	Vuelta al Táchira	Venezuela	2.2	Joseph Chavarría (CRC)	Nestlé-Giant	
January 18–24	Tour de San Luis	Argentina	2.1	Dayer Quintana (COL)	Movistar Team	
February 27 – March 5	Vuelta a la Independencia Nacional	Dominican Republic	2.2	Ismael Sánchez (DOM)	Aero Cycling Team	
March 18–27	Vuelta al Uruguay	Uruguay	2.2	Néstor Pías (URU)	Schneck Alas Rojas	
April 6–10	Volta Ciclística Internacional do Rio Grande do Sul	Brazil	2.2	Murilo Affonso (BRA)	Funvic Soul Cycles–Carrefour	
April 21–24	Joe Martin Stage Race	United States	2.2	Neilson Powless (USA)	Axeon–Hagens Berman	
4–8 May	Tour of the Gila	United States	2.2	Lachlan Morton (AUS)	Jelly Belly–Maxxis	
15–22 May	Tour of California	United States	2.HC	Julian Alaphilippe (FRA)	Etixx–Quick-Step	
19 May	Pan American Championships – Time Trial	Venezuela	CC	Walter Vargas (COL)	Orgullo Paisa	
22 May	Pan American Championships – Road Race	Venezuela	CC	Jonathan Caicedo (ECU)	Strongman–Campagnolo Wilier	
30 May	Winston-Salem Cycling Classic	United States	1.1	Ryan Roth (CAN)	Silber Pro Cycling Team	
June 5	Philadelphia International Cycling Classic	United States	1.1	Eduard Prades (ESP)	Caja Rural–Seguros RGA	
June 9–12	Grand Prix Cycliste de Saguenay	Canada	2.2	Ryan Roth (CAN)	Silber Pro Cycling Team	
June 13–26	Vuelta a Colombia	Colombia	2.2	Mauricio Ortega (COL)	Supergiros–Redetrans	
June 15–19	Tour de Beauce	Canada	2.2	Gregory Daniel (USA)	Axeon–Hagens Berman	
July 8–17	Vuelta a Venezuela	Venezuela	2.2	Yonathan Monsalve (VEN)	JHS Aves	
July 10	White Spot / Delta Road Race	Canada	1.2	Ryan Roth (CAN)	Silber Pro Cycling Team	
Jul 29–Aug 7	Tour Cycliste International de la Guadeloupe	Guadeloupe	2.2	Damien Monier (FRA)	Bridgestone–Anchor	
August 1–7	The Larry H.Miller Tour of Utah	United States	2.HC	Lachlan Morton (AUS)	Jelly Belly–Maxxis	
Aug 31–Sep 5	Tour of Alberta	Canada	2.1	Robin Carpenter (USA)	Holowesko Citadel Racing Team	
September 10	The Reading 120	United States	1.2	Oscar Clark (USA)	Holowesko Citadel Racing Team	
October 2	Tobago Cycling Classic	Trinidad and Tobago	1.2	James Piccoli (CAN)	PSL/RBC	

== Final standings ==
Rank	Name	Team	Points
1.	Greg Van Avermaet (BEL)	BMC Racing Team	615
2.	Julian Alaphilippe (FRA)	Etixx–Quick-Step	570
3.	Jakob Fuglsang (DEN)	Astana	475
4.	Rafał Majka (POL)	Tinkoff	435
5.	Fabian Cancellara (SUI)	Trek–Segafredo	360
6.	Lachlan Morton (AUS)	Jelly Belly–Maxxis	326
7.	Rohan Dennis (AUS)	BMC Racing Team	295
8.	Robin Carpenter (USA)	Holowesko Citadel Racing Team	277
9.	Joaquim Rodríguez (ESP)	Team Katusha	275
10.	Chris Froome (GBR)	Team Sky	270

Rank	Team	Points
1.	Holowesko Citadel Racing Team	738
2.	Silber Pro Cycling Team	645
3.	Axeon–Hagens Berman	612
4.	Jelly Belly–Maxxis	581
5.	Rally Cycling	541
6.	Funvic Soul Cycles–Carrefour	377
7.	Team Jamis	374
8.	UnitedHealthcare	330
9.	Movistar Team América	306
10.	Strongman–Campagnolo–Wilier	273

Rank	Nation	Points
1.	Colombia	2753.5
2.	United States	2008.5
3.	Canada	1241
4.	Argentina	862.75
5.	Venezuela	721
6.	Chile	497.33
7.	Mexico	463
8.	Costa Rica	434
9.	Brazil	423.66
10.	Ecuador	375.75
