= 2016 UCI Asia Tour =

- Twelfth edition of the UCI Asia Tour

Details
- Dates: 20 January 2016–2 October 2016
- Location: Asia
- Races: 24

Champions
- Individual champion: Mark Cavendish (GBR) (Team Dimension Data)
- Teams' champion: Pishgaman–Giant
- Nations' champion: Iran

The 2016 UCI Asia Tour was the 12th season of the UCI Asia Tour. The season began on 20 February 2016 with the Le Tour de Filipinas and ended on 2 October 2016 with the Tour of Almaty.

The points leader, based on the cumulative results of previous races, wears the UCI Asia Tour cycling jersey. Samad Pourseyedi (378 points) from Iran is the defending champion of the 2015 UCI Asia Tour.

Throughout the season, points are awarded to the top finishers of stages within stage races and the final general classification standings of each of the stages races and one-day events. The quality and complexity of a race also determines how many points are awarded to the top finishers, the higher the UCI rating of a race, the more points are awarded.

The UCI ratings from highest to lowest are as follows:

- Multi-day events: 2.HC, 2.1 and 2.2
- One-day events: 1.HC, 1.1 and 1.2

== Events ==
Date	Race Name	Location	UCI Rating	Winner	Team	Ref
20 January	Asian Cycling Championships – Time Trial U23	Japan	CC	Maral-erdene Batmunkh (MNG)	Mongolia (national team)	
21 January	Asian Cycling Championships – Time Trial	Japan	CC	Cheung King Lok (HKG)	Hong Kong (national team)	
23 January	Asian Cycling Championships – Road Race U23	Japan	CC	Mehdi Rajabi (IRI)	Iran (national team)	
24 January	Asian Cycling Championships – Road Race	Japan	CC	Cheung King Lok (HKG)	Hong Kong (national team)	
3–6 February	Dubai Tour	United Arab Emirates	2.HC	Marcel Kittel (GER)	Etixx–Quick-Step	
8–12 February	Tour of Qatar	Qatar	2.HC	Mark Cavendish (GBR)	Team Dimension Data	
16–21 February	Tour of Oman	Oman	2.HC	Vincenzo Nibali (ITA)	Astana	
18–21 February	Tour de Filipinas	Philippines	2.2	Oleg Zemlyakov (KAZ)	Vino 4ever SKO	
24 Feb–2 Mar	Tour de Langkawi	Malaysia	2.HC	Reinardt Janse van Rensburg (RSA)	Team Dimension Data	
6–10 March	Tour de Taiwan	Taiwan	2.1	Robbie Hucker (AUS)	Avanti IsoWhey Sports	
1–6 April	Tour of Thailand	Thailand	2.2	Benjamin Hill (AUS)	Attaque Team Gusto	
11–14 May	Tour de Ijen	Indonesia	2.2	Jai Crawford (AUS)	Kinan Cycling Team	
13–18 May	Tour of Iran (Azerbaijan)	Iran	2.1	Samad Pourseyedi (IRN)	Tabriz Shahrdari Team	
19–23 May	Tour de Flores	Indonesia	2.2	Daniel Whitehouse (NZL)	Terengganu Cycling Team	
29 May–5 June	Tour of Japan	Japan	2.1	Óscar Pujol (ESP)	Team Ukyo	
5–12 June	Tour de Korea	South Korea	2.1	Grega Bole (SLO)	Nippo–Vini Fantini	
16–19 June	Tour de Kumano	Japan	2.2	Óscar Pujol (ESP)	Team Ukyo	
17–30 July	Tour of Qinghai Lake	China	2.HC	Sergiy Lagkuti (UKR)	Kolss BDC Team	
31 July	Tour de Jakarta	Indonesia	1.2	Ryan MacAnally (AUS)	Pegasus Continental Cycling Team	
6–14 August	Tour de Singkarak	Indonesia	2.2	Amir Kolahdozhagh (IRI)	Pishgaman–Giant	
1–3 September	Tour de Hokkaido	Japan	2.2	Nariyuki Masuda (JPN)	Utsunomiya Blitzen	
9–16 September	Tour of China I	China	2.1	Raffaello Bonusi (ITA)	Androni Giocattoli–Sidermec	
18–25 September	Tour of China II	China	2.1	Marco Benfatto (ITA)	Androni Giocattoli–Sidermec	
2 October	Tour of Almaty	Kazakhstan	1.1	Alexey Lutsenko (KAZ)	Astana	
18–22 October	Jelajah Malaysia	Malaysia	2.2	Arvin Moazemi (IRI)	Pishgaman–Giant	
20–23 October	Abu Dhabi Tour	United Arab Emirates	2.1	Tanel Kangert (EST)	Astana	
23 October	Japan Cup	Japan	1.HC	Davide Villella (ITA)	Cannondale–Drapac	

== Final standings ==
Rank	Name	Team	Points
1.	Mark Cavendish (GBR)	Team Dimension Data	800
2.	Peter Sagan (SVK)	Tinkoff	600
3.	Giacomo Nizzolo (ITA)	Trek–Segafredo	488
4.	Edvald Boasson Hagen (NOR)	Team Dimension Data	455
5.	Alexander Kristoff (NOR)	Team Katusha	425
6.	Tom Boonen (BEL)	Etixx–Quick-Step	400
7.	King Lok Cheung (HKG)	Orica–BikeExchange	365
8.	Tony Martin (GER)	Etixx–Quick-Step	350
9.	Vincenzo Nibali (ITA)	Astana	343
10.	Mirsamad Pourseyedigolakhour (IRI)	Tabriz Shahrdari Team	333

Rank	Team	Points
1	Pishgaman–Giant	915
2	Tabriz Shahrdari Team	884
3	Kolss BDC Team	794
4	Vino 4ever SKO	631
5	Team Ukyo	571
6	Nippo–Vini Fantini	548
7	Terengganu Cycling Team	455
8	Avanti IsoWhey Sports	436
9	Drapac Professional Cycling	393
10	Kinan Cycling Team	355

Rank	Nation	Points
1	Iran	1587
2	Kazakhstan	1451
3	Japan	884
4	South Korea	718
5	Hong Kong	555
6	Mongolia	263
7	Malaysia	201
8	Indonesia	154
9	Kuwait	143
10	China	141
10	Chinese Taipei	141
