= List of 2016 UCI WorldTeams and riders =

This page is a list of 2016 UCI WorldTeams and riders. These teams competed in the 2016 UCI World Tour.

2016 UCI WorldTeams
Code	Official team name	Licence holder	Country	Groupset	Bicycles
ALM	AG2R La Mondiale (2016 season)	EUSRL France Cyclisme	France	SRAM	Focus
AST	Astana (2016 season)	Abacanto SA	Kazakhstan	Campagnolo	Specialized
BMC	BMC Racing Team (2016 season)	Continuum Sports LLC	United States	Shimano	BMC
CPT	Cannondale–Drapac (2016 season)	Slipstream Sports, LLC	United States	Shimano	Cannondale
DDD	Team Dimension Data (2016 season)		South Africa	Shimano	Cervélo
EQS	Etixx–Quick-Step (2016 season)	Esperanza bvba	Belgium	Shimano	Specialized
FDJ	FDJ (2016 season)	Société de Gestion de L'Echappée	France	Shimano	Lapierre
IAM	IAM Cycling (2016 season)		Switzerland	Shimano	Scott
LAM	Lampre–Merida (2016 season)	CGS Cycling Team AG	Italy	Shimano	Merida
LTS	Lotto–Soudal (2016 season)	Belgian Cycling Company sa	Belgium	Campagnolo	Ridley
MOV	Movistar Team (2016 season)	Abarca Sports S.L.	Spain	Campagnolo	Canyon
OGE	Orica–BikeExchange (2016 season)	GreenEdge Cycling	Australia	Shimano	Scott
TGA	Team Giant–Alpecin (2016 season)	SMS Cycling B.V.	Germany	Shimano	Giant
KAT	Team Katusha (2016 season)	Katusha Management SA	Russia	SRAM	Canyon
TLJ	LottoNL–Jumbo (2016 season)	Rabo Wielerploegen	Netherlands	Shimano	Bianchi
SKY	Team Sky (2016 season)	Tour Racing Limited	Great Britain	Shimano	Pinarello
TNK	Tinkoff (2016 season)	Tinkoff Sport	Russia	Shimano	Specialized
TFR	Trek–Segafredo (2016 season)	Trek Bicycle Corporation	United States	Shimano	Trek

== Riders ==
=== AG2R La Mondiale ===
Rider	Date of birth
Gediminas Bagdonas (LTU)	26 December 1985 (aged 30)
Jan Bakelants (BEL)	14 February 1986 (aged 29)
Romain Bardet (FRA)	9 November 1990 (aged 25)
Julien Bérard (FRA)	2 July 1987 (aged 28)
François Bidard (FRA)	12 March 1992 (aged 23)
Guillaume Bonnafond (FRA)	23 June 1987 (aged 28)
Mikaël Cherel (FRA)	17 March 1986 (aged 29)
Benoît Cosnefroy (Note: Cosnefroy joined the team on 1 August as a stagiaire, from Chambéry CF.) (FRA)	17 October 1995 (aged 20)
Maxime Daniel (FRA)	5 June 1991 (aged 24)
Nico Denz (GER)	15 February 1994 (aged 21)
Axel Domont (FRA)	7 August 1990 (aged 25)
Samuel Dumoulin (FRA)	20 August 1980 (aged 35)
Hubert Dupont (FRA)	13 November 1980 (aged 35)
Étienne Fabre (Note: Fabre joined the team on 1 August as a stagiaire, from Chambéry CF.) (FRA)	5 August 1996 (aged 19)
Ben Gastauer (LUX)	14 November 1987 (aged 28)
Damien Gaudin (FRA)	20 August 1986 (aged 29)
Cyril Gautier (FRA)	26 September 1987 (aged 28)

Rider	Date of birth
Alexis Gougeard (FRA)	5 March 1993 (aged 22)
Patrick Gretsch (GER)	7 April 1987 (aged 28)
Hugo Houle (CAN)	27 September 1990 (aged 25)
Quentin Jaurégui (FRA)	22 April 1994 (aged 21)
Blel Kadri (FRA)	3 September 1986 (aged 29)
Pierre-Roger Latour (FRA)	12 October 1993 (aged 22)
Sébastien Minard (FRA)	12 June 1982 (aged 33)
Matteo Montaguti (ITA)	6 January 1984 (aged 32)
Jean-Christophe Péraud (FRA)	22 May 1977 (aged 38)
Domenico Pozzovivo (ITA)	30 November 1982 (aged 33)
Christophe Riblon (FRA)	17 January 1981 (aged 34)
Rémy Rochas (Note: Rochas joined the team on 1 August as a stagiaire, from Chambéry CF.) (FRA)	18 May 1996 (aged 19)
Jesse Sergent (Note: Sergent retired from cycling on July 22.) (NZL)	8 July 1988 (aged 27)
Sébastien Turgot (FRA)	11 April 1984 (aged 31)
Johan Vansummeren (Note: Vansummeren retired from cycling on June 29.) (BEL)	4 February 1981 (aged 34)
Alexis Vuillermoz (FRA)	1 June 1988 (aged 27)

=== Astana ===
As of 29 March 2016

Rider	Date of birth
Valerio Agnoli (ITA)	6 January 1985 (aged 31)
Fabio Aru (ITA)	3 July 1990 (aged 25)
Maxat Ayazbayev (KAZ)	27 January 1992 (aged 24)
Lars Boom (NED)	30 December 1985 (aged 30)
Eros Capecchi (ITA)	13 June 1986 (aged 29)
Dario Cataldo (ITA)	17 March 1985 (aged 31)
Laurens De Vreese (BEL)	29 September 1988 (aged 27)
Daniil Fominykh (KAZ)	28 August 1991 (aged 24)
Jakob Fuglsang (DEN)	22 March 1985 (aged 31)
Dmitriy Gruzdev (KAZ)	13 March 1986 (aged 30)
Andrea Guardini (ITA)	12 June 1989 (aged 26)
Andriy Hrivko (UKR)	7 August 1983 (aged 32)
Arman Kamyshev (KAZ)	14 March 1991 (aged 25)
Tanel Kangert (EST)	11 March 1987 (aged 29)

Rider	Date of birth
Bakhtiyar Kozhatayev (KAZ)	28 March 1992 (aged 24)
Miguel Ángel López (COL)	4 February 1994 (aged 22)
Alexey Lutsenko (KAZ)	7 September 1992 (aged 23)
Davide Malacarne (ITA)	11 June 1987 (aged 28)
Vincenzo Nibali (ITA)	14 November 1984 (aged 31)
Diego Rosa (ITA)	27 March 1989 (aged 27)
Luis León Sánchez (ESP)	24 November 1983 (aged 32)
Michele Scarponi (ITA)	25 September 1979 (aged 36)
Gatis Smukulis (LAT)	15 April 1987 (aged 28)
Paolo Tiralongo (ITA)	8 July 1977 (aged 38)
Ruslan Tleubayev (KAZ)	7 March 1987 (aged 29)
Alessandro Vanotti (ITA)	16 September 1980 (aged 35)
Lieuwe Westra (NED)	11 September 1982 (aged 33)
Andrey Zeits (KAZ)	14 December 1986 (aged 29)

=== BMC Racing Team ===
As of 29 March 2016

Rider	Date of birth
Darwin Atapuma (COL)	January 15, 1988 (aged 28)
Tom Bohli (SUI)	January 17, 1994 (aged 22)
Brent Bookwalter (USA)	February 16, 1984 (aged 32)
Marcus Burghardt (GER)	June 30, 1983 (aged 32)
Damiano Caruso (ITA)	August 12, 1987 (aged 28)
Alessandro De Marchi (ITA)	May 19, 1986 (aged 29)
Rohan Dennis (AUS)	May 28, 1990 (aged 25)
Silvan Dillier (SUI)	August 3, 1990 (aged 25)
Jempy Drucker (LUX)	September 3, 1986 (aged 29)
Taylor Eisenhart (Note: Eisenhart joined the team on 1 August as a stagiaire, from BMC Development Team.) (USA)	14 June 1994 (aged 21)
Floris Gerts (NED)	May 3, 1992 (aged 23)
Philippe Gilbert (BEL)	July 5, 1982 (aged 33)
Ben Hermans (BEL)	June 8, 1986 (aged 29)
Stefan Küng (SUI)	November 16, 1993 (aged 22)
Fabian Lienhard (Note: Lienhard joined the team on 1 August as a stagiaire, from BMC Development Team.) (SUI)	3 September 1993 (aged 22)
Amaël Moinard (FRA)	February 2, 1982 (aged 34)

Rider	Date of birth
Daniel Oss (ITA)	January 13, 1987 (aged 29)
Taylor Phinney (USA)	June 27, 1990 (aged 25)
Richie Porte (AUS)	June 30, 1985 (aged 30)
Manuel Quinziato (ITA)	October 30, 1979 (aged 36)
Joey Rosskopf (USA)	September 5, 1989 (aged 26)
Samuel Sánchez (ESP)	February 5, 1978 (aged 38)
Michael Schär (SUI)	September 29, 1986 (aged 29)
Manuel Senni (ITA)	March 11, 1992 (aged 24)
Dylan Teuns (BEL)	March 1, 1992 (aged 24)
Greg Van Avermaet (BEL)	May 17, 1985 (aged 30)
Tejay van Garderen (USA)	August 12, 1988 (aged 27)
Peter Velits (SVK)	August 12, 1985 (aged 30)
Loïc Vliegen (BEL)	December 20, 1993 (aged 22)
Danilo Wyss (SUI)	August 26, 1985 (aged 30)
Rick Zabel (GER)	December 7, 1993 (aged 22)

=== Cannondale–Drapac ===
As of 29 March 2016

Rider	Date of birth
Jack Bauer (NZL)	April 7, 1985 (aged 30)
Alberto Bettiol (ITA)	October 23, 1993 (aged 22)
Patrick Bevin (NZL)	May 1, 1991 (aged 24)
Matti Breschel (DEN)	31 August 1984 (aged 31)
Nate Brown (USA)	July 6, 1991 (aged 24)
André Cardoso (POR)	September 3, 1984 (aged 31)
Simon Clarke (AUS)	July 18, 1986 (aged 29)
Lawson Craddock (USA)	February 20, 1992 (aged 24)
Jonathan Dibben (Note: Dibben joined the team on 1 August as a stagiaire, from WIGGINS.) (GBR)	February 12, 1994 (aged 22)
Joe Dombrowski (USA)	May 12, 1991 (aged 24)
Davide Formolo (ITA)	October 25, 1992 (aged 23)
Phil Gaimon (USA)	January 26, 1986 (aged 30)
Alex Howes (USA)	January 1, 1988 (aged 28)
Ben King (USA)	March 22, 1989 (aged 27)
Kristijan Koren (SLO)	November 25, 1986 (aged 29)
Sebastian Langeveld (NED)	January 17, 1985 (aged 31)

Rider	Date of birth
Alan Marangoni (ITA)	July 16, 1984 (aged 31)
Moreno Moser (ITA)	December 25, 1990 (aged 25)
Ryan Mullen (IRL)	August 7, 1994 (aged 21)
Ramūnas Navardauskas (LTU)	January 30, 1988 (aged 28)
Pierre Rolland (FRA)	October 10, 1986 (aged 29)
Kristoffer Skjerping (NOR)	May 4, 1993 (aged 22)
Toms Skujiņš (LAT)	June 15, 1991 (aged 24)
Tom-Jelte Slagter (NED)	July 1, 1989 (aged 26)
Andrew Talansky (USA)	November 23, 1988 (aged 27)
Dylan van Baarle (NED)	May 22, 1993 (aged 22)
Davide Villella (ITA)	June 27, 1991 (aged 24)
Rigoberto Urán (COL)	January 26, 1987 (aged 29)
Wouter Wippert (NED)	August 14, 1990 (aged 25)
Michael Woods (CAN)	October 12, 1986 (aged 29)
Ruben Zepuntke (GER)	January 29, 1993 (aged 23)

=== Team Dimension Data ===
As of 10 January 2016

Rider	Date of birth
Igor Anton (ESP)	2 March 1983 (aged 32)
Natnael Berhane (ERI)	5 January 1991 (aged 25)
Edvald Boasson Hagen (NOR)	17 May 1987 (aged 28)
Theo Bos (NED)	22 August 1983 (aged 32)
Matt Brammeier (IRL)	7 June 1985 (aged 30)
Mark Cavendish (GBR)	21 May 1985 (aged 30)
Steve Cummings (GBR)	19 March 1981 (aged 34)
Mekseb Debesay (ERI)	16 June 1991 (aged 24)
Nicolas Dougall (RSA)	21 November 1992 (aged 23)
Bernhard Eisel (AUT)	17 February 1981 (aged 34)
Metkel Eyob (Note: Eyob joined the team on 29 July as a stagiaire, from Dimension Data for Qhubeka.) (ERI)	4 September 1993 (aged 22)
Tyler Farrar (USA)	2 June 1984 (aged 31)
Omar Fraile (ESP)	17 July 1990 (aged 25)
Amanuel Gebrezgabihier (Note: Gebrezgabihier joined the team on 29 July as a stagiaire, from Dimension Data for Qhubeka.) (ERI)	17 August 1994 (aged 21)
Ryan Gibbons (Note: Gibbons joined the team on 29 July as a stagiaire, from Dimension Data for Qhubeka.) (RSA)	13 August 1994 (aged 21)
Nathan Haas (AUS)	12 March 1989 (aged 26)

Rider	Date of birth
Jacques Janse van Rensburg (RSA)	6 September 1987 (aged 28)
Reinardt Janse van Rensburg (RSA)	3 February 1989 (aged 26)
Songezo Jim (RSA)	19 September 1990 (aged 25)
Merhawi Kudus (ERI)	23 January 1994 (aged 21)
Cameron Meyer (Note: Meyer left the team on June 15.) (AUS)	11 June 1988 (aged 27)
Adrien Niyonshuti (RWA)	2 February 1987 (aged 28)
Serge Pauwels (BEL)	21 November 1983 (aged 32)
Youcef Reguigui (ALG)	9 January 1990 (aged 26)
Mark Renshaw (AUS)	22 October 1982 (aged 33)
Kristian Sbaragli (ITA)	8 May 1990 (aged 25)
Kanstantsin Siutsou (BLR)	9 August 1982 (aged 33)
Daniel Teklehaymanot (ERI)	10 November 1988 (aged 27)
Jay Thomson (RSA)	12 April 1986 (aged 29)
Johann Van Zyl (RSA)	2 February 1991 (aged 24)
Jaco Venter (RSA)	13 February 1987 (aged 28)

=== Etixx–Quick-Step ===
As of 30 July 2016

Rider	Date of birth
Julian Alaphilippe (FRA)	11 June 1992 (aged 23)
Tom Boonen (BEL)	15 October 1980 (aged 35)
Maxime Bouet (FRA)	3 November 1986 (aged 29)
Gianluca Brambilla (ITA)	22 August 1987 (aged 28)
Rodrigo Contreras (COL)	2 June 1994 (aged 21)
Adrien Costa (Note: Costa joined the team on 1 August as a stagiaire, from Axeon–Hagens Berman.) (USA)	19 August 1997 (aged 18)
Laurens De Plus (BEL)	4 September 1995 (aged 20)
David de la Cruz (ESP)	6 May 1989 (aged 26)
Iván García (Note: García joined the team on 1 August as a stagiaire, from Klein Constantia.) (ESP)	20 November 1995 (aged 20)
Fernando Gaviria (COL)	19 August 1994 (aged 21)
Bob Jungels (LUX)	22 September 1992 (aged 23)
Iljo Keisse (BEL)	21 December 1982 (aged 33)
Marcel Kittel (GER)	11 May 1988 (aged 27)
Yves Lampaert (BEL)	10 April 1991 (aged 24)
Nikolas Maes (BEL)	9 April 1986 (aged 29)
Dan Martin (IRL)	20 August 1986 (aged 29)
Tony Martin (GER)	23 April 1985 (aged 30)

Rider	Date of birth
Davide Martinelli (ITA)	31 May 1993 (aged 22)
Gianni Meersman (BEL)	5 December 1985 (aged 30)
Maximiliano Richeze (ARG)	7 March 1983 (aged 33)
Fabio Sabatini (ITA)	10 February 1985 (aged 31)
Hamish Schreurs (Note: Schreurs joined the team on 27 July as a stagiaire, from Klein Constantia.) (NZL)	23 January 1994 (aged 22)
Pieter Serry (BEL)	21 November 1988 (aged 27)
Zdeněk Štybar (CZE)	11 December 1985 (aged 30)
Niki Terpstra (NED)	18 May 1984 (aged 31)
Matteo Trentin (ITA)	2 August 1989 (aged 26)
Petr Vakoč (CZE)	11 July 1992 (aged 23)
Guillaume Van Keirsbulck (BEL)	14 February 1991 (aged 25)
Stijn Vandenbergh (BEL)	25 April 1984 (aged 31)
Martin Velits (SVK)	21 February 1985 (aged 31)
Julien Vermote (BEL)	26 July 1989 (aged 26)
Carlos Verona (Note: Verona left the team on 30 July, to join Orica–BikeExchange.) (ESP)	4 November 1992 (aged 23)
Łukasz Wiśniowski (POL)	7 December 1991 (aged 24)

=== FDJ ===
As of 29 March 2016

Rider	Date of birth
William Bonnet (FRA)	June 25, 1982 (aged 33)
Sébastien Chavanel (FRA)	March 21, 1983 (aged 33)
Arnaud Courteille (FRA)	March 13, 1989 (aged 27)
Mickaël Delage (FRA)	August 6, 1985 (aged 30)
Arnaud Démare (FRA)	August 26, 1991 (aged 24)
Fabien Doubey (Note: Doubey joined the team on 1 August as a stagiaire, from CC Étupes.) (FRA)	21 October 1993 (aged 22)
Odd Christian Eiking (NOR)	December 28, 1994 (aged 21)
Kenny Elissonde (FRA)	July 22, 1991 (aged 24)
Murilo Fischer (BRA)	June 16, 1979 (aged 36)
Marc Fournier (FRA)	November 12, 1994 (aged 21)
David Gaudu (Note: Gaudu joined the team on 1 August as a stagiaire, from Cotes d'Armor-Marie Morin.) (FRA)	10 October 1996 (aged 19)
Alexandre Geniez (FRA)	April 16, 1988 (aged 27)
Daniel Hoelgaard (NOR)	July 1, 1993 (aged 22)
Ignatas Konovalovas (LTU)	December 8, 1985 (aged 30)
Mathieu Ladagnous (FRA)	December 12, 1984 (aged 31)
Johan Le Bon (FRA)	October 3, 1990 (aged 25)
Olivier Le Gac (FRA)	August 27, 1993 (aged 22)

Rider	Date of birth
Pierre-Henri Lecuisinier (FRA)	June 30, 1993 (aged 22)
Jérémy Maison (FRA)	July 21, 1993 (aged 22)
Lorrenzo Manzin (FRA)	July 26, 1994 (aged 21)
Steve Morabito (SUI)	January 30, 1983 (aged 33)
Yoann Offredo (FRA)	November 12, 1986 (aged 29)
Laurent Pichon (FRA)	July 19, 1986 (aged 29)
Cédric Pineau (FRA)	May 8, 1985 (aged 30)
Thibaut Pinot (FRA)	May 29, 1990 (aged 25)
Sébastien Reichenbach (SUI)	May 28, 1989 (aged 26)
Kévin Reza (FRA)	May 18, 1988 (aged 27)
Anthony Roux (FRA)	April 18, 1987 (aged 28)
Jérémy Roy (FRA)	June 22, 1983 (aged 32)
Marc Sarreau (FRA)	June 10, 1993 (aged 22)
Benoît Vaugrenard (FRA)	January 5, 1982 (aged 34)
Arthur Vichot (FRA)	November 26, 1988 (aged 27)
Léo Vincent (Note: Vincent joined the team on 1 August as a stagiaire, from CC Étupes.) (FRA)	6 November 1995 (aged 20)

=== IAM Cycling ===
As of 29 March 2016

Rider	Date of birth
Marcel Aregger (SUI)	August 26, 1990 (aged 25)
Matthias Brändle (AUT)	December 7, 1989 (aged 26)
Clément Chevrier (FRA)	June 29, 1992 (aged 23)
Stef Clement (NED)	September 24, 1982 (aged 33)
Jérôme Coppel (FRA)	August 6, 1986 (aged 29)
Stefan Denifl (AUT)	September 20, 1987 (aged 28)
Dries Devenyns (BEL)	July 22, 1983 (aged 32)
Martin Elmiger (SUI)	September 23, 1978 (aged 37)
Sondre Holst Enger (NOR)	December 17, 1993 (aged 22)
Mathias Frank (SUI)	December 9, 1986 (aged 29)
Jonathan Fumeaux (SUI)	March 7, 1988 (aged 28)
Heinrich Haussler (AUS)	February 25, 1984 (aged 32)
Reto Hollenstein (SUI)	August 22, 1985 (aged 30)
Leigh Howard (AUS)	October 18, 1989 (aged 26)

Rider	Date of birth
Roger Kluge (GER)	February 5, 1986 (aged 30)
Vegard Stake Laengen (NOR)	February 7, 1989 (aged 27)
Pirmin Lang (SUI)	November 25, 1984 (aged 31)
Oliver Naesen (BEL)	September 16, 1990 (aged 25)
Jarlinson Pantano (COL)	November 19, 1988 (aged 27)
Simon Pellaud (SUI)	November 6, 1992 (aged 23)
Matteo Pelucchi (ITA)	January 21, 1989 (aged 27)
Vicente Reynés (ESP)	July 30, 1981 (aged 34)
Aleksejs Saramotins (LAT)	April 8, 1982 (aged 33)
David Tanner (AUS)	September 30, 1984 (aged 31)
Jonas van Genechten (BEL)	September 16, 1986 (aged 29)
Larry Warbasse (USA)	June 28, 1990 (aged 25)
Marcel Wyss (SUI)	June 25, 1986 (aged 29)
Oliver Zaugg (SUI)	May 9, 1981 (aged 34)

=== Lampre–Merida ===
As of 29 March 2016

Rider	Date of birth
Yukiya Arashiro (JPN)	22 September 1984 (aged 31)
Matteo Bono (ITA)	11 November 1983 (aged 32)
Mattia Cattaneo (ITA)	25 October 1990 (aged 25)
Davide Cimolai (ITA)	13 August 1989 (aged 26)
Valerio Conti (ITA)	30 March 1993 (aged 22)
Mário Costa (POR)	15 November 1985 (aged 30)
Rui Costa (POR)	5 October 1986 (aged 29)
Kristijan Đurasek (CRO)	26 July 1987 (aged 28)
Chun Kai Feng (TWN)	2 November 1988 (aged 27)
Roberto Ferrari (ITA)	9 March 1983 (aged 33)
Tsgabu Grmay (ETH)	25 August 1991 (aged 24)
Ilia Koshevoy (BLR)	20 March 1991 (aged 25)
Marko Kump (SLO)	9 September 1988 (aged 27)
Fausto Masnada (Note: Masnada joined the team on 1 August as a stagiaire, from Team Colpack.) (ITA)	6 November 1993 (aged 22)

Rider	Date of birth
Louis Meintjes (RSA)	21 February 1992 (aged 24)
Sacha Modolo (ITA)	19 June 1987 (aged 28)
Matej Mohorič (SLO)	19 October 1994 (aged 21)
Manuele Mori (ITA)	9 August 1980 (aged 35)
Przemysław Niemiec (POL)	11 April 1980 (aged 35)
Simone Petilli (ITA)	4 May 1993 (aged 22)
Luka Pibernik (SLO)	23 November 1993 (aged 22)
Jan Polanc (SLO)	6 May 1992 (aged 23)
Edward Ravasi (Note: Ravasi joined the team on 1 August as a stagiaire, from Team Colpack.) (ITA)	5 June 1994 (aged 21)
Oliviero Troia (Note: Troia joined the team on 1 August as a stagiaire, from Team Colpack.) (ITA)	1 September 1994 (aged 21)
Diego Ulissi (ITA)	15 July 1989 (aged 26)
Xu Gang (CHN)	28 January 1984 (aged 32)
Federico Zurlo (ITA)	25 February 1994 (aged 22)

=== Lotto–Soudal ===
As of 29 March 2016

Rider	Date of birth
Sander Armée (BEL)	10 December 1985 (aged 30)
Lars Bak (DEN)	16 January 1980 (aged 36)
Tiesj Benoot (BEL)	11 March 1994 (aged 22)
Kris Boeckmans (BEL)	13 February 1987 (aged 29)
Stig Broeckx (BEL)	10 May 1990 (aged 25)
Sean De Bie (BEL)	3 October 1991 (aged 24)
Jasper De Buyst (BEL)	24 November 1993 (aged 22)
Bart De Clercq (BEL)	26 August 1986 (aged 29)
Thomas De Gendt (BEL)	6 November 1986 (aged 29)
Jens Debusschere (BEL)	28 August 1989 (aged 26)
Kevin Deltombe (Note: Deltombe joined the team on 1 August as a stagiaire, from Lotto–Soudal U23.) (BEL)	27 February 1994 (aged 22)
Gert Dockx (BEL)	4 July 1988 (aged 27)
Frederik Frison (BEL)	28 July 1992 (aged 23)
Tony Gallopin (FRA)	19 April 1988 (aged 27)
Michael Goolaerts (Note: Goolaerts joined the team on 1 August as a stagiaire, from Lotto–Soudal U23.) (BEL)	24 July 1995 (aged 20)

Rider	Date of birth
André Greipel (GER)	16 July 1982 (aged 33)
Adam Hansen (AUS)	11 May 1981 (aged 34)
Greg Henderson (NZL)	10 September 1976 (aged 39)
Pim Ligthart (NED)	16 June 1988 (aged 27)
Tomasz Marczyński (POL)	6 March 1984 (aged 32)
Maxime Monfort (BEL)	14 January 1983 (aged 33)
Jürgen Roelandts (BEL)	2 July 1985 (aged 30)
James Shaw (Note: Shaw joined the team on 1 August as a stagiaire, from Lotto–Soudal U23.) (GBR)	6 June 1996 (aged 19)
Marcel Sieberg (GER)	30 April 1982 (aged 33)
Rafael Valls (ESP)	27 June 1987 (aged 28)
Tosh Van der Sande (BEL)	28 November 1990 (aged 25)
Jelle Vanendert (BEL)	19 February 1985 (aged 31)
Louis Vervaeke (BEL)	6 November 1993 (aged 22)
Jelle Wallays (BEL)	11 May 1989 (aged 26)
Tim Wellens (BEL)	10 May 1991 (aged 24)

=== Movistar Team ===
As of 29 March 2016

Rider	Date of birth
Andrey Amador (CRC)	29 August 1986 (aged 29)
Winner Anacona (COL)	11 September 1988 (aged 27)
Jorge Arcas (ESP)	8 July 1992 (aged 23)
Carlos Betancur (COL)	13 October 1989 (aged 26)
Richard Carapaz (Note: Carapaz joined the team on 27 July as a stagiaire, from Lizarte.) (ECU)	29 May 1993 (aged 22)
Jonathan Castroviejo (ESP)	27 April 1987 (aged 28)
Alex Dowsett (GBR)	3 October 1988 (aged 27)
Imanol Erviti (ESP)	15 November 1983 (aged 32)
Rubén Fernández (ESP)	1 March 1991 (aged 25)
Jesús Herrada (ESP)	26 July 1990 (aged 25)
José Herrada (ESP)	1 October 1985 (aged 30)
Gorka Izagirre (ESP)	7 October 1987 (aged 28)
Ion Izagirre (ESP)	4 February 1989 (aged 27)
Juan José Lobato (ESP)	28 December 1988 (aged 27)

Rider	Date of birth
Adriano Malori (ITA)	28 January 1988 (aged 28)
Daniel Moreno (ESP)	5 September 1981 (aged 34)
Javier Moreno (ESP)	18 July 1984 (aged 31)
Nelson Oliveira (POR)	6 March 1989 (aged 27)
Antonio Pedrero (ESP)	23 October 1991 (aged 24)
Dayer Quintana (COL)	10 August 1992 (aged 23)
Nairo Quintana (COL)	4 February 1990 (aged 26)
José Joaquín Rojas (ESP)	8 June 1985 (aged 30)
Marc Soler (ESP)	22 November 1993 (aged 22)
Rory Sutherland (AUS)	8 February 1982 (aged 34)
Jasha Sütterlin (GER)	4 November 1992 (aged 23)
Alejandro Valverde (ESP)	25 April 1980 (aged 35)
Francisco Ventoso (ESP)	6 May 1982 (aged 33)
Giovanni Visconti (ITA)	13 January 1983 (aged 33)

=== Orica–BikeExchange ===
As of 1 August 2016

Rider	Date of birth
Michael Albasini (SUI)	20 December 1980 (aged 35)
Sam Bewley (NZL)	22 July 1987 (aged 28)
Esteban Chaves (COL)	17 January 1990 (aged 26)
Cheung King Lok (HKG)	8 February 1991 (aged 25)
Magnus Cort (DEN)	16 January 1993 (aged 23)
Mitchell Docker (AUS)	2 October 1986 (aged 29)
Luke Durbridge (AUS)	9 April 1991 (aged 24)
Alex Edmondson (AUS)	22 December 1993 (aged 22)
Caleb Ewan (AUS)	11 July 1994 (aged 21)
Simon Gerrans (AUS)	16 May 1980 (aged 35)
Jack Haig (AUS)	6 September 1993 (aged 22)
Mathew Hayman (AUS)	20 April 1978 (aged 37)
Michael Hepburn (AUS)	17 August 1991 (aged 24)
Damien Howson (AUS)	13 August 1992 (aged 23)

Rider	Date of birth
Daryl Impey (RSA)	6 December 1984 (aged 31)
Christopher Juul-Jensen (DEN)	6 July 1989 (aged 26)
Jens Keukeleire (BEL)	23 November 1988 (aged 27)
Christian Meier (CAN)	2 September 1985 (aged 30)
Luka Mezgec (SLO)	27 June 1988 (aged 27)
Rubén Plaza (ESP)	29 February 1980 (aged 36)
Robert Power (AUS)	11 May 1995 (aged 20)
Nick Schultz (Note: Schultz joined the team on 1 August as a stagiaire, from SEG Racing Academy.) (AUS)	13 September 1994 (aged 21)
Svein Tuft (CAN)	19 May 1977 (aged 38)
Amets Txurruka (ESP)	10 November 1982 (aged 33)
Carlos Verona (ESP)	4 November 1992 (aged 23)
Adam Yates (GBR)	7 August 1992 (aged 23)
Simon Yates (GBR)	7 August 1992 (aged 23)

=== Team Giant–Alpecin ===
As of 29 March 2016

Rider	Date of birth
Søren Kragh Andersen (DEN)	10 August 1994 (aged 21)
Nikias Arndt (GER)	18 November 1991 (aged 24)
Bert De Backer (BEL)	2 April 1984 (aged 31)
Warren Barguil (FRA)	28 October 1991 (aged 24)
Roy Curvers (NED)	27 December 1979 (aged 36)
John Degenkolb (GER)	7 January 1989 (aged 27)
Tom Dumoulin (NED)	11 November 1990 (aged 25)
Caleb Fairly (Note: Fairly retired from cycling on May 22.) (USA)	19 February 1987 (aged 29)
Johannes Fröhlinger (GER)	9 June 1985 (aged 30)
Simon Geschke (GER)	13 March 1986 (aged 30)
Lars van der Haar (NED)	23 July 1991 (aged 24)
Chad Haga (USA)	26 August 1988 (aged 27)
Ji Cheng (CHN)	15 July 1987 (aged 28)
Carter Jones (Note: Jones retired from cycling on July 1.) (USA)	27 February 1989 (aged 27)

Rider	Date of birth
Max Kanter (Note: Kanter joined the team on 1 August as a stagiaire, from LKT Team Brandenburg.) (GER)	22 October 1997 (aged 18)
Koen de Kort (NED)	8 September 1982 (aged 33)
Fredrik Ludvigsson (SWE)	28 April 1994 (aged 21)
Tobias Ludvigsson (SWE)	22 February 1991 (aged 25)
Sindre Lunke (NOR)	17 April 1993 (aged 22)
Sam Oomen (NED)	15 August 1995 (aged 20)
Georg Preidler (AUT)	17 June 1990 (aged 25)
Ramon Sinkeldam (NED)	9 February 1989 (aged 27)
Tom Stamsnijder (NED)	15 May 1985 (aged 30)
Laurens ten Dam (NED)	13 November 1980 (aged 35)
Albert Timmer (NED)	13 June 1985 (aged 30)
Tom Veelers (NED)	14 September 1984 (aged 31)
Zico Waeytens (BEL)	29 September 1991 (aged 24)
Max Walscheid (GER)	13 June 1993 (aged 22)

=== Team Katusha ===
As of 29 March 2016

Rider	Date of birth
Maxim Belkov (RUS)	9 January 1985 (aged 31)
Sven Erik Bystrøm (NOR)	21 January 1992 (aged 24)
Sergey Chernetskiy (RUS)	9 April 1990 (aged 25)
Jacopo Guarnieri (ITA)	14 August 1987 (aged 28)
Marco Haller (AUT)	1 April 1991 (aged 24)
Vladimir Isaichev (RUS)	26 April 1986 (aged 29)
Pavel Kochetkov (RUS)	7 March 1986 (aged 30)
Dmitry Kozonchuk (RUS)	5 April 1984 (aged 31)
Alexander Kristoff (NOR)	5 July 1987 (aged 28)
Vyacheslav Kuznetsov (RUS)	24 June 1989 (aged 26)
Sergey Lagutin (RUS)	14 January 1981 (aged 35)
Alberto Losada (ESP)	28 February 1982 (aged 34)
Tiago Machado (POR)	18 October 1985 (aged 30)
Alexander Maes (Note: Maes joined the team on 9 August as a stagiaire, from Home Solution-Anmapa-Soenens.) (BEL)	20 June 1993 (aged 22)
Matvey Mamykin (RUS)	31 October 1994 (aged 21)

Rider	Date of birth
Michael Mørkøv (DEN)	30 April 1985 (aged 30)
Nils Politt (GER)	6 March 1994 (aged 22)
Alexander Porsev (RUS)	21 February 1986 (aged 30)
Jhonatan Restrepo (COL)	24 November 1994 (aged 21)
Joaquim Rodríguez (ESP)	12 May 1979 (aged 36)
Egor Silin (RUS)	25 June 1988 (aged 27)
Simon Špilak (SLO)	23 June 1986 (aged 29)
Rein Taaramäe (EST)	24 April 1987 (aged 28)
Alexey Tsatevich (RUS)	5 July 1989 (aged 26)
Jurgen Van den Broeck (BEL)	1 February 1983 (aged 33)
Ángel Vicioso (ESP)	13 April 1977 (aged 38)
Eduard Vorganov (RUS)	1 December 1982 (aged 33)
Anton Vorobyev (RUS)	12 October 1990 (aged 25)
Ilnur Zakarin (RUS)	15 September 1989 (aged 26)

=== LottoNL–Jumbo ===
As of 2016

Rider	Date of birth
Enrico Battaglin (ITA)	17 November 1989 (aged 26)
George Bennett (NZL)	7 April 1990 (aged 25)
Koen Bouwman (NED)	2 December 1993 (aged 22)
Victor Campenaerts (BEL)	28 October 1991 (aged 24)
Twan Castelijns (NED)	23 January 1989 (aged 27)
Robert Gesink (NED)	31 May 1986 (aged 29)
Marc Goos (NED)	30 November 1990 (aged 25)
Dylan Groenewegen (NED)	21 June 1993 (aged 22)
Moreno Hofland (NED)	31 August 1991 (aged 24)
Zhi Hui Jiang (Note: Jiang joined the team on 1 August as a stagiaire, from SEG Racing Academy.) (CHN)	3 March 1994 (aged 21)
Martijn Keizer (NED)	25 March 1988 (aged 27)
Wilco Kelderman (NED)	25 March 1991 (aged 24)
Steven Kruijswijk (NED)	7 June 1987 (aged 28)
Steven Lammertink (NED)	4 December 1993 (aged 22)
Tom Leezer (NED)	26 December 1985 (aged 30)

Rider	Date of birth
Bert-Jan Lindeman (NED)	16 June 1989 (aged 26)
Paul Martens (GER)	26 October 1983 (aged 32)
Primož Roglič (SLO)	29 October 1989 (aged 26)
Timo Roosen (NED)	11 January 1993 (aged 23)
Bram Tankink (NED)	3 December 1978 (aged 37)
Mike Teunissen (NED)	25 August 1992 (aged 23)
Maarten Tjallingii (NED)	5 November 1977 (aged 38)
Tom Van Asbroeck (BEL)	19 April 1990 (aged 25)
Jos van Emden (NED)	27 June 1985 (aged 30)
Sep Vanmarcke (BEL)	28 July 1988 (aged 27)
Dennis van Winden (NED)	2 December 1987 (aged 28)
Alexey Vermeulen (USA)	16 December 1994 (aged 21)
Robert Wagner (GER)	17 April 1983 (aged 32)
Maarten Wynants (BEL)	13 May 1982 (aged 33)

=== Team Sky ===
As of 9 August 2016

Rider	Date of birth
Ian Boswell (USA)	7 February 1991 (aged 25)
Philip Deignan (IRL)	7 September 1983 (aged 32)
Owain Doull (Note: Doull joined the team on 1 August as a stagiaire, from WIGGINS.) (GBR)	17 October 1995 (aged 20)
Andrew Fenn (GBR)	1 July 1990 (aged 26)
Chris Froome (GBR)	20 May 1985 (aged 31)
Michał Gołaś (POL)	29 April 1984 (aged 32)
Sebastián Henao (COL)	5 August 1993 (aged 23)
Sergio Henao (COL)	10 December 1987 (aged 28)
Beñat Intxausti (ESP)	20 March 1986 (aged 30)
Peter Kennaugh (GBR)	15 June 1989 (aged 27)
Vasil Kiryienka (BLR)	28 June 1981 (aged 35)
Christian Knees (GER)	5 March 1981 (aged 35)
Michał Kwiatkowski (POL)	2 June 1990 (aged 26)
Mikel Landa (ESP)	3 December 1989 (aged 26)
Leopold König (CZE)	15 November 1987 (aged 28)

Rider	Date of birth
David López (ESP)	13 May 1981 (aged 35)
Gianni Moscon (ITA)	20 April 1994 (aged 22)
Mikel Nieve (ESP)	26 May 1984 (aged 32)
Lars Petter Nordhaug (NOR)	14 May 1984 (aged 32)
Alex Peters (GBR)	31 March 1994 (aged 22)
Wout Poels (NED)	1 October 1987 (aged 28)
Salvatore Puccio (ITA)	31 August 1989 (aged 26)
Nicolas Roche (IRL)	3 July 1984 (aged 32)
Luke Rowe (GBR)	10 March 1990 (aged 26)
Ian Stannard (GBR)	25 May 1987 (aged 29)
Ben Swift (GBR)	5 November 1987 (aged 28)
Geraint Thomas (GBR)	25 May 1986 (aged 30)
Danny van Poppel (NED)	26 July 1993 (aged 23)
Elia Viviani (ITA)	7 February 1989 (aged 27)
Xabier Zandio (ESP)	17 March 1977 (aged 39)

=== Tinkoff ===
As of 29 March 2016

Rider	Date of birth
Davide Ballerini (Note: Ballerini joined the team on 1 August as a stagiaire, from Hopplà Petroli Firenze.) (ITA)	21 September 1994 (aged 21)
Erik Baška (SVK)	12 January 1994 (aged 22)
Daniele Bennati (ITA)	24 September 1980 (aged 35)
Adam Blythe (GBR)	1 October 1989 (aged 26)
Manuele Boaro (ITA)	12 March 1987 (aged 29)
Maciej Bodnar (POL)	7 March 1985 (aged 31)
Pavel Brutt (RUS)	29 January 1982 (aged 34)
Alberto Contador (ESP)	6 December 1982 (aged 33)
Lorenzo Fortunato (Note: Fortunato joined the team on 1 August as a stagiaire, from Hopplà Petroli Firenze.) (ITA)	9 May 1996 (aged 19)
Oscar Gatto (ITA)	1 January 1985 (aged 31)
Michael Gogl (AUT)	4 November 1993 (aged 22)
Jesper Hansen (DEN)	23 October 1990 (aged 25)
Jesús Hernández (ESP)	28 September 1981 (aged 34)
Robert Kišerlovski (CRO)	9 August 1986 (aged 29)
Michael Kolář (SVK)	21 December 1992 (aged 23)

Rider	Date of birth
Roman Kreuziger (CZE)	6 May 1986 (aged 29)
Rafał Majka (POL)	12 September 1989 (aged 26)
Jay McCarthy (AUS)	8 September 1992 (aged 23)
Andrea Montagnoli (Note: Montagnoli joined the team on 1 August as a stagiaire, from Hopplà Petroli Firenze.) (ITA)	27 July 1995 (aged 20)
Sérgio Paulinho (POR)	26 March 1980 (aged 36)
Evgeni Petrov (RUS)	25 May 1978 (aged 37)
Paweł Poljański (POL)	6 May 1990 (aged 25)
Michael Rogers (Note: Rogers retired from cycling on April 25.) (AUS)	20 December 1979 (aged 36)
Ivan Rovny (RUS)	30 September 1987 (aged 28)
Juraj Sagan (SVK)	23 December 1988 (aged 27)
Peter Sagan (SVK)	26 January 1990 (aged 26)
Matteo Tosatto (ITA)	14 May 1974 (aged 41)
Yuri Trofimov (RUS)	26 January 1984 (aged 32)
Nikolay Trusov (RUS)	2 July 1985 (aged 30)
Michael Valgren (DEN)	7 February 1992 (aged 24)

=== Trek–Segafredo ===
As of January 1, 2016

Rider	Date of birth
Eugenio Alafaci (ITA)	August 9, 1990 (aged 25)
Piet Allegaert (Note: Allegaert joined the team on 1 August as a stagiaire, from EFC–Etixx.) (BEL)	January 20, 1995 (aged 20)
Julián Arredondo (COL)	July 30, 1988 (aged 27)
Fumiyuki Beppu (JPN)	April 10, 1983 (aged 32)
Julien Bernard (FRA)	March 17, 1992 (aged 23)
Jack Bobridge (AUS)	July 13, 1989 (aged 26)
Niccolò Bonifazio (ITA)	October 29, 1993 (aged 22)
Fabian Cancellara (SUI)	March 18, 1981 (aged 34)
Marco Coledan (ITA)	August 22, 1988 (aged 27)
Stijn Devolder (BEL)	August 29, 1979 (aged 36)
Laurent Didier (LUX)	July 19, 1984 (aged 31)
Fabio Felline (ITA)	March 29, 1990 (aged 25)
Ryder Hesjedal (CAN)	December 9, 1980 (aged 35)
Markel Irizar (ESP)	February 5, 1980 (aged 35)

Rider	Date of birth
Bauke Mollema (NED)	November 26, 1986 (aged 29)
Jacopo Mosca (Note: Mosca joined the team on 1 August as a stagiaire, from Viris Maserati-Sisal Matchpoint.) (ITA)	August 29, 1993 (aged 22)
Giacomo Nizzolo (ITA)	January 30, 1989 (aged 26)
Yaroslav Popovych (Note: Popovych retired from cycling on April 11.) (UKR)	January 4, 1980 (aged 35)
Grégory Rast (SUI)	January 17, 1980 (aged 35)
Kiel Reijnen (USA)	June 1, 1986 (aged 29)
José Luis Rodríguez Aguilar (Note: Rodríguez Aguilar joined the team on 1 August as a stagiaire, from World Cycling Centre.) (CHI)	June 1, 1994 (aged 21)
Fränk Schleck (LUX)	April 15, 1980 (aged 35)
Peter Stetina (USA)	August 8, 1987 (aged 28)
Jasper Stuyven (BEL)	April 17, 1992 (aged 23)
Edward Theuns (BEL)	April 30, 1991 (aged 24)
Boy van Poppel (NED)	January 18, 1988 (aged 27)
Riccardo Zoidl (AUT)	April 8, 1988 (aged 27)
Haimar Zubeldia (ESP)	April 1, 1977 (aged 38)

== See also ==
- 2016 in men's road cycling
- List of 2016 UCI Professional Continental and Continental teams
- List of 2016 UCI Women's Teams

Preceded by 2015	List of UCI WorldTeams and riders 2016	Succeeded by 2017
