= Kristof Trouvé =

Belgian former professional road cyclist

Personal information
- Born: 11 August 1976 (age 50) Deinze, Belgium

Cycling career
- Sport: Cycling
- Current team: Retired
- Discipline: Road
- Role: Rider

Amateur team
- 1996: Lotto (stagiaire)

Professional teams
- 1998–2000: Vlaanderen 2002–Eddy Merckx
- 2001–2003: Collstrop–Palmans
- 2004–2005: Mr. Bookmaker–Palmans–Collstrop

Kristof Trouvé (born 11 August 1976 in Deinze) is a Belgian former professional road cyclist. He won the Crystal Bicycle for Best Young Rider in 1994.

== Major results ==
1994
1st Road race, National Junior Road Championships
1st Overall Keizer der Juniores
3rd Ronde van Vlaanderen Juniors
1996
1st Stage 3 Tour du Loir-et-Cher
1st Stage 3 OZ Wielerweekend
2nd Liège–Bastogne–Liège U23
4th Schaal Sels
1997
1st Seraing-Aachen-Seraing
2000
1st Mountains classification, Circuit Franco-Belge
7th Omloop van de Vlaamse Scheldeboorden
2001
2nd GP Rudy Dhaenens
4th Tour Beneden-Maas
5th Overall Circuit Franco-Belge
6th Grote Prijs Jef Scherens
6th GP Rik Van Steenbergen
2003
6th GP Stad Zottegem
6th Vlaamse Havenpijl
10th Omloop van het Waasland
2004
9th Grand Prix S.A.T.S.
9th Omloop van de Vlaamse Scheldeboorden
2005
7th De Drie Zustersteden
