= 2017 Tour La Provence =

UCI Europe Tour

Race details
- Dates: 21–23 February 2017
- Stages: 3
- Distance: 532.7 km (331.0 mi)
- Winning time: 12h 55' 14"

Results
Jersey awarded to the overall winner	Winner	Rohan Dennis (Australia)	(BMC Racing Team)
	Second	Mattia Cattaneo (Italy)	(Androni Giocattoli–Sidermec)
	Third	Alexandre Geniez (France)	(FDJ)
Jersey awarded to the points classification winner	Points	Rohan Dennis (Australia)	(BMC Racing Team)
Jersey awarded to the mountains classification winner	Mountains	Jan Polanc (Slovenia)	(UAE Team Emirates)
Jersey awarded to the youth classification winner	Youth	Léo Vincent (France)	(FDJ)
	Team	BMC Racing Team	

The 2017 Tour La Provence was a road cycling stage race that took place between 21 and 23 February 2017. The race was rated as a 2.1 event as part of the 2017 UCI Europe Tour, and was the second edition of the Tour La Provence.

The race was won by Australian rider Rohan Dennis, of the BMC Racing Team; Dennis finished second to Frenchman Alexandre Geniez (FDJ) on the second stage to take the leader's blue jersey, and maintained this with another second-place stage finish the following day – behind Italy's Mattia Cattaneo from the Androni Giocattoli–Sidermec team – to take the victory overall by two seconds ahead of Cattaneo. Geniez completed the podium, a further two seconds in arrears, after a tie-break with Direct Énergie rider Jonathan Hivert.

Dennis also won the points classification as the most consistent finisher over the three days, with Geniez winning the multi-coloured jersey for the best cumulative placings in the general, points and mountains classifications. UAE Team Emirates rider Jan Polanc was the winner of the mountains classification, while the young rider classification was claimed by Geniez's teammate Léo Vincent, finishing 15th overall. In fifth place overall, Julien El Fares (Delko–Marseille Provence KTM) was the top-placed rider from the Provence region, while the teams classification was won by the BMC Racing Team.

== Teams ==
Eighteen teams were invited to start the race. These included four UCI WorldTeams, six UCI Professional Continental teams, seven UCI Continental teams and a French national team.

UCI WorldTeams

- AG2R La Mondiale
- BMC Racing Team
- FDJ
- UAE Team Emirates

UCI Professional Continental teams

- Cofidis
- Delko–Marseille Provence KTM
- Direct Énergie
- WB Veranclassic Aqua Protect
- Androni Giocattoli–Sidermec
- Fortuneo–Vital Concept

UCI Continental teams

- Amore & Vita–Selle SMP
- Armée de Terre
- GM Europa Ovini
- HP BTP–Auber93
- Kuwait–Cartucho.es
- Roth–Akros
- Roubaix–Lille Métropole

National teams

- France

== Route ==
Stage schedule
Stage	Date	Route	Distance	Type	Winner
1	21 February	Aubagne to Istres	205.9 km (128 mi)	Hilly stage	Justin Jules (FRA)
2	22 February	Miramas to La Ciotat	158.6 km (99 mi)	Hilly stage	Alexandre Geniez (FRA)
3	23 February	Aix-en-Provence to Marseille	168.2 km (105 mi)	Hilly stage	Mattia Cattaneo (ITA)

== Stages ==
=== Stage 1 ===
21 February 2017 — Aubagne to Istres, 205.9 km (128 mi)

Result of Stage 1 & General classification after Stage 1
Rank	Rider	Team	Time
1	Justin Jules (FRA)	WB Veranclassic Aqua Protect	4h 52' 43"
2	Jérémy Lecroq (FRA)	Roubaix–Lille Métropole	+ 0"
3	Lorrenzo Manzin (FRA)	FDJ	+ 0"
4	Danilo Wyss (SUI)	BMC Racing Team	+ 0"
5	David Menut (FRA)	HP BTP–Auber93	+ 0"
6	Rudy Barbier (FRA)	AG2R La Mondiale	+ 0"
7	Anthony Maldonado (FRA)	HP BTP–Auber93	+ 0"
8	Oliviero Troia (ITA)	UAE Team Emirates	+ 0"
9	Damiano Caruso (ITA)	BMC Racing Team	+ 0"
10	Yannick Martinez (FRA)	Delko–Marseille Provence KTM	+ 0"

=== Stage 2 ===
22 February 2017 — Miramas to La Ciotat, 158.6 km (99 mi)

Result of Stage 2
Rank	Rider	Team	Time
1	Alexandre Geniez (FRA)	FDJ	3h 57' 12"
2	Rohan Dennis (AUS)	BMC Racing Team	+ 0"
3	Nicolas Edet (FRA)	Cofidis	+ 0"
4	Matej Mohorič (SLO)	UAE Team Emirates	+ 0"
5	Jérémy Lecroq (FRA)	Roubaix–Lille Métropole	+ 4"
6	Bryan Alaphilippe (FRA)	Armée de Terre	+ 4"
7	Simon Sellier (FRA)	France (national team)	+ 4"
8	David Menut (FRA)	HP BTP–Auber93	+ 4"
9	Oliviero Troia (ITA)	UAE Team Emirates	+ 4"
10	Armindo Fonseca (FRA)	Fortuneo–Vital Concept	+ 4"

General classification after Stage 2
Rank	Rider	Team	Time
1	Rohan Dennis (AUS)	BMC Racing Team	8h 49' 55"
2	Alexandre Geniez (FRA)	FDJ	+ 0"
3	Matej Mohorič (SLO)	UAE Team Emirates	+ 0"
4	Nicolas Edet (FRA)	Cofidis	+ 0"
5	Jérémy Lecroq (FRA)	Roubaix–Lille Métropole	+ 4"
6	Justin Jules (FRA)	WB Veranclassic Aqua Protect	+ 4"
7	David Menut (FRA)	HP BTP–Auber93	+ 4"
8	Oliviero Troia (ITA)	UAE Team Emirates	+ 4"
9	Rudy Barbier (FRA)	AG2R La Mondiale	+ 4"
10	Bryan Alaphilippe (FRA)	Armée de Terre	+ 4"

=== Stage 3 ===
23 February 2017 — Aix-en-Provence to Marseille, 168.2 km (105 mi)

Result of Stage 3
Rank	Rider	Team	Time
1	Mattia Cattaneo (ITA)	Androni Giocattoli–Sidermec	4h 05' 17"
2	Rohan Dennis (AUS)	BMC Racing Team	+ 2"
3	Jonathan Hivert (FRA)	Direct Énergie	+ 2"
4	Alexandre Geniez (FRA)	FDJ	+ 6"
5	Julien El Fares (FRA)	Delko–Marseille Provence KTM	+ 9"
6	Damiano Caruso (ITA)	BMC Racing Team	+ 11"
7	Anthony Roux (FRA)	FDJ	+ 11"
8	Justin Jules (FRA)	WB Veranclassic Aqua Protect	+ 11"
9	Nicolas Edet (FRA)	Cofidis	+ 11"
10	Maxime Bouet (FRA)	Fortuneo–Vital Concept	+ 11"

Final general classification
Rank	Rider	Team	Time
1	Rohan Dennis (AUS)	BMC Racing Team	12h 55' 14"
2	Mattia Cattaneo (ITA)	Androni Giocattoli–Sidermec	+ 2"
3	Alexandre Geniez (FRA)	FDJ	+ 4"
4	Jonathan Hivert (FRA)	Direct Énergie	+ 4"
5	Nicolas Edet (FRA)	Cofidis	+ 9"
6	Julien El Fares (FRA)	Delko–Marseille Provence KTM	+ 11"
7	Justin Jules (FRA)	WB Veranclassic Aqua Protect	+ 13"
8	Anthony Maldonado (FRA)	HP BTP–Auber93	+ 13"
9	Damiano Caruso (ITA)	BMC Racing Team	+ 13"
10	Maxime Bouet (FRA)	Fortuneo–Vital Concept	+ 13"

== Classification leadership table ==
In the 2017 Tour La Provence, four different jerseys were awarded for the main classifications. For the general classification, calculated by adding each cyclist's finishing times on each stage, the leader received a blue jersey. This classification was considered the most important of the 2017 Tour La Provence, and the winner of the classification was considered the winner of the race.

Additionally, there was a points classification, which awarded a green jersey. In the points classification, cyclists received points for finishing in the top 15 in a mass-start stage. For winning a stage, a rider earned 25 points, with 20 for second, 16 for third, 13 for fourth, 11 for fifth with a point fewer per place down to a single point for 15th place. Points towards the classification could also be accrued at intermediate sprint points during each stage. There was also a mountains classification, the leadership of which was marked by a red jersey. In the mountains classification, points were won by reaching the top of a climb before other cyclists, with more points available for the higher-categorised climbs. The fourth jersey represented the young rider classification, marked by a white jersey. This was decided in the same way as the general classification, but only riders born after 1 January 1994 were eligible to be ranked in the classification.

Additional jerseys were also awarded for the best rider in the overall classification from the Provence region (grey jersey), the most combative rider (black jersey) and the rider placed highest cumulatively across the general, points and mountains classification (multi-coloured jersey).

Stage	Winner	General classification	Points classification	Mountains classification	Young rider classification	Regional rider classification	Combination classification	Teams classification
1	Justin Jules	Justin Jules	Justin Jules	Alexandre Geniez	Jérémy Lecroq	Anthony Maldonado	Damiano Caruso	BMC Racing Team
2	Alexandre Geniez	Rohan Dennis	Jérémy Lecroq	Alexandre Geniez	Matej Mohorič	Anthony Maldonado	Alexandre Geniez	BMC Racing Team
3	Mattia Cattaneo	Rohan Dennis	Rohan Dennis	Jan Polanc	Léo Vincent	Julien El Fares	Alexandre Geniez	BMC Racing Team
Final		Rohan Dennis	Rohan Dennis	Jan Polanc	Léo Vincent	Julien El Fares	Alexandre Geniez	BMC Racing Team
