= 2016 FDJ season =

FDJ
- 2016 season
- UCI code: FDJ
- Status: UCI WorldTeam
- Manager: Marc Madiot
- Main sponsor(s): Française des Jeux
- Based: France
- Bicycles: Lapierre
- Groupset: Shimano

Season victories
- One-day races: 2
- Stage race overall: 3
- Stage race stages: 12
- National Championships: 3
- Jersey

The 2016 season for FDJ began in January at the Tour Down Under. As a UCI WorldTeam, they were automatically invited and obligated to send a squad to every event in the UCI World Tour.

== Team roster ==
As of 29 March 2016

Rider	Date of birth
William Bonnet (FRA)	June 25, 1982 (aged 33)
Sébastien Chavanel (FRA)	March 21, 1983 (aged 33)
Arnaud Courteille (FRA)	March 13, 1989 (aged 27)
Mickaël Delage (FRA)	August 6, 1985 (aged 30)
Arnaud Démare (FRA)	August 26, 1991 (aged 24)
Fabien Doubey (Note: Doubey joined the team on 1 August as a stagiaire, from CC Étupes.) (FRA)	21 October 1993 (aged 22)
Odd Christian Eiking (NOR)	December 28, 1994 (aged 21)
Kenny Elissonde (FRA)	July 22, 1991 (aged 24)
Murilo Fischer (BRA)	June 16, 1979 (aged 36)
Marc Fournier (FRA)	November 12, 1994 (aged 21)
David Gaudu (Note: Gaudu joined the team on 1 August as a stagiaire, from Cotes d'Armor-Marie Morin.) (FRA)	10 October 1996 (aged 19)
Alexandre Geniez (FRA)	April 16, 1988 (aged 27)
Daniel Hoelgaard (NOR)	July 1, 1993 (aged 22)
Ignatas Konovalovas (LTU)	December 8, 1985 (aged 30)
Mathieu Ladagnous (FRA)	December 12, 1984 (aged 31)
Johan Le Bon (FRA)	October 3, 1990 (aged 25)
Olivier Le Gac (FRA)	August 27, 1993 (aged 22)

Rider	Date of birth
Pierre-Henri Lecuisinier (FRA)	June 30, 1993 (aged 22)
Jérémy Maison (FRA)	July 21, 1993 (aged 22)
Lorrenzo Manzin (FRA)	July 26, 1994 (aged 21)
Steve Morabito (SUI)	January 30, 1983 (aged 33)
Yoann Offredo (FRA)	November 12, 1986 (aged 29)
Laurent Pichon (FRA)	July 19, 1986 (aged 29)
Cédric Pineau (FRA)	May 8, 1985 (aged 30)
Thibaut Pinot (FRA)	May 29, 1990 (aged 25)
Sébastien Reichenbach (SUI)	May 28, 1989 (aged 26)
Kévin Reza (FRA)	May 18, 1988 (aged 27)
Anthony Roux (FRA)	April 18, 1987 (aged 28)
Jérémy Roy (FRA)	June 22, 1983 (aged 32)
Marc Sarreau (FRA)	June 10, 1993 (aged 22)
Benoît Vaugrenard (FRA)	January 5, 1982 (aged 34)
Arthur Vichot (FRA)	November 26, 1988 (aged 27)
Léo Vincent (Note: Vincent joined the team on 1 August as a stagiaire, from CC Étupes.) (FRA)	6 November 1995 (aged 20)

Riders who joined the team for the 2016 season
Rider	2015 team
Odd Christian Eiking	neo-pro (Team Joker)
Marc Fournier	neo-pro (CC Nogent-sur-Oise)
Daniel Hoelgaard	neo-pro (Team Joker)
Ignatas Konovalovas	Marseille 13-KTM
Jérémy Maison	neo-pro (CC Etupes)
Sébastien Reichenbach	IAM Cycling

Riders who left the team during or after the 2015 season
Rider	2016 team
David Boucher	Crelan–Vastgoedservice
Anthony Geslin	Retires
Arnold Jeannesson	Cofidis
Francis Mourey	Fortuneo–Vital Concept
Jussi Veikkanen	Retires

== Season victories ==
Date	Race	Competition	Rider	Country	Location
7 February	Étoile de Bessèges, Teams classification	UCI Europe Tour	(Note: The riders on the squad were Thibaut Pinot, Arnaud Démare, Mickaël Delage, Sébastien Reichenbach, Arthur Vichot, Kévin Reza, Daniel Hoelgaard and Ignatas Konovalovas)	France	
11 February	La Méditerranéenne, Stage 1	UCI Europe Tour	Team Time Trial (Note: The winning riders were Arnaud Démare, Mickaël Delage, Odd Christian Eiking, Daniel Hoelgaard, Ignatas Konovalovas, Mathieu Ladagnous, Marc Sarreau, Alexandre Geniez)	Spain	Banyoles
12 February	La Méditerranéenne, Stage 2	UCI Europe Tour	Arnaud Démare (FRA)	France	Port-Vendres
21 February	Tour du Haut Var, Stage 2	UCI Europe Tour	Arthur Vichot (FRA)	France	Draguignan
21 February	Tour du Haut Var, Overall	UCI Europe Tour	Arthur Vichot (FRA)	France	
21 February	Tour du Haut Var, Points classification	UCI Europe Tour	Arthur Vichot (FRA)	France	
7 March	Paris–Nice, Stage 1	UCI World Tour	Arnaud Démare (FRA)	France	Vendôme
19 March	Milan–San Remo	UCI World Tour	Arnaud Démare (FRA)	Italy	Sanremo
26 March	Critérium International, Stage 2	UCI Europe Tour	Thibaut Pinot (FRA)	France	Porto-Vecchio
27 March	Critérium International, Stage 3	UCI Europe Tour	Thibaut Pinot (FRA)	France	L'Ospedale
27 March	Critérium International, Overall	UCI Europe Tour	Thibaut Pinot (FRA)	France	
27 March	Critérium International, Points classification	UCI Europe Tour	Thibaut Pinot (FRA)	France	
27 March	Critérium International, Teams classification	UCI Europe Tour	(Note: The riders on the squad were Thibaut Pinot, William Bonnet, Odd Christian Eiking, Alexandre Geniez, Laurent Pichon, Sébastien Reichenbach, Anthony Roux and Jérémy Roy)	France	
5 April	Circuit de la Sarthe, Stage 1	UCI Europe Tour	Marc Fournier (FRA)	France	Château-du-Loir
8 April	Circuit de la Sarthe, Overall	UCI Europe Tour	Marc Fournier (FRA)	France	
8 April	Circuit de la Sarthe, Young rider classification	UCI Europe Tour	Marc Fournier (FRA)	France	
29 April	Tour de Romandie, Stage 3	UCI World Tour	Thibaut Pinot (FRA)	Switzerland	Sion
22 May	Tour of Norway, Youth classification	UCI Europe Tour	Odd Christian Eiking (NOR)	Norway	
11 June	Critérium du Dauphiné, Stage 6	UCI World Tour	Thibaut Pinot (FRA)	France	Méribel
19 June	Route du Sud, Stage 5	UCI Europe Tour	Arnaud Démare (FRA)	France	Astarac Arros en Gascogne
19 June	Route du Sud, Points classification	UCI Europe Tour	Arnaud Démare (FRA)	France	
13 August	Tour de l'Ain, Stage 4	UCI Europe Tour	Alexandre Geniez (FRA)	France	Belley
22 August	Vuelta a España, Stage 3	UCI World Tour	Alexandre Geniez (FRA)	Spain	Dumbría
4 October	Binche–Chimay–Binche	UCI Europe Tour	Arnaud Démare (FRA)	Belgium	Binche

== National, Continental and World champions 2016 ==
Date	Discipline	Jersey	Rider	Country	Location
23 June	French National Time Trial Champion		Thibaut Pinot (FRA)	France	Vesoul
24 June	Lithuanian National Time Trial Champion		Ignatas Konovalovas (LTU)	Lithuania	Ignalina
26 June	French National Road Race Champion		Arthur Vichot (FRA)	France	Vesoul
