= Grote 1-MeiPrijs =

Cycling race in Belgium

Race details
- Date: 1 May
- Region: Hoboken, Flanders, Belgium
- Local name: 1-MeiPrijs (in Dutch)
- Discipline: Road
- Competition: UCI Europe Tour
- Type: One-day race

History
- First edition: 1928
- Editions: 88
- Final edition: 2015
- First winner: Alexander Maes (BEL)
- Most wins: 3 riders (3 wins each)
- Final winner: Kevin Suarez Martinez (BEL)

The Grote 1-MeiPrijs (also named Ereprijs Victor De Bruyne) was a European single-day cycle race held in the Belgian region of Flanders, around Hoboken. From 2005, the race was organized as a 1.2 event on the UCI Europe Tour. The race was downgraded to a national event in 2014 and was not held after 2015.

== Winners ==
Year	Country	Rider	Team
1928	Belgium	Alexander Maes	
1929	Belgium	Joseph Dervaes	
1930	Belgium	Joseph Dervaes	
1931	Belgium	Joseph Dervaes	
1932	Belgium	Pierre Vereecke	
1933	Belgium	Maurits Raes	
1934	Belgium	Edgard De Caluwé	
1935	Belgium	Karel Kaers	
1936	Belgium	Remy Van Den Steen	
1937	Belgium	Karel Kaers	
1938	Netherlands	Theo Middelkamp	
1939	Belgium	Gustaaf Deloor	
1940	Netherlands	Frans Pauwels	
1941	Belgium	Odiel Van Den Meersschaut	
1942	Belgium	Georges Claes	
1943	Belgium	Gorgon Hermans	
1944	Belgium	Sylvain Grysolle	
1945	Belgium	Maurice Meersman	
1946	Belgium	Eugène Kiewiet	
1947	Belgium	Maurice Mollin	
1948	Belgium	René Mertens	
1949	Belgium	Omer Dhaenens	
1950	Belgium	Gustaaf Salembier	
1951	Belgium	Karel De Baere	
1952	Belgium	Gerard Buyl	
1953	Belgium	Frans Loyaerts	
1954	Belgium	Gaston De Wachter	
1955	Belgium	Léo Buyst	
1956	Netherlands	Harrie De Boer	
1957	Belgium	Karel Clerckx	
1958	Netherlands	Gerrit Voorting	
1959	Belgium	Gentiel Saelens	
1960	Belgium	Gentiel Saelens	
1961	Belgium	Jean-Baptiste Claes	
1962	Belgium	Rik Luyten	
1963	Belgium	Frans Melckenbeeck	
1964	Belgium	Leon Vandaele	
1965	Netherlands	Bart Zoet	
1966	Belgium	Piet Oellibrandt	
1967	Belgium	Marin Creële	
1968	Belgium	Rene Corthout	
1969	Netherlands	Jacques Frijters	
1970	Belgium	Ronny Van De Vijver	
1971	Belgium	Eddy Goossens	
1972	Belgium	Raymond Steegmans	
1973	Belgium	Jozef Abelshausen	
1974	Belgium	Jos Jacobs	IJsboerke–Colner
1975	Belgium	Jos Jacobs	Europ Decor
1976	Belgium	Jos Jacobs	Verandalux–Dries
1977	Belgium	Etienne Van Der Helst	Maes Pils–Mini Flat
1978	Belgium	Eddy Verstraeten	
1979	Belgium	Dirk Baert	
1980	Belgium	Frans Van Looy	
1981	Belgium	Eric Vandeperre	
1982	Netherlands	Gerrie Van Gerwen	
1983	Belgium	Alain De Roo	
1984	Belgium	Alain De Roo	
1985	Belgium	Jan Bogaert	
1986	Netherlands	Ad Wijnands	
1987	Belgium	Herman Frison	
1988	Belgium	Jan Bogaert	
1989	Belgium	Johan Devos	
1990	Belgium	Kurt Onclin	
1991	Netherlands	Michel Cornelisse	
1992	Belgium	Jan Bogaert	
1993	Netherlands	Peter Pieters	
1994	Belgium	Johnny Dauwe	
1995	Belgium	Tom Steels	
1996	Netherlands	Michel Cornelisse	
1997	Belgium	Peter Spaenhoven	
1998	Denmark	Frank Høj	
1999	Belgium	Frank Corvers	
2000	Belgium	Tony Bracke	
2001	Belgium	Geert Omloop	
2002	Great Britain	Roger Hammond	
2003	Belgium	Joseph Boulton	
2004	Belgium	Jurgen Van Loocke	
2005	Great Britain	Hamish Haynes	Team Cyclingnews.com
2006	Belgium	Jean-Philippe Dony	
2007	Netherlands	Wouter Mol	P3 Transfer–Fondas
2008	Netherlands	Bobbie Traksel	P3 Transfer–Batavus
2009	France	Denis Flahaut	Landbouwkrediet–Colnago
2010	Belgium	Jan Kuyckx	Qin Cycling Team
2011	Lithuania	Aidis Kruopis	Landbouwkrediet
2012	Belgium	Christophe Prémont	Wallonie Bruxelles–Crédit Agricole
2013	Netherlands	Coen Vermeltfoort	Cycling Team De Rijke–Shanks
2014	Belgium	Walt De Winter	
2015	Belgium	Kevin Suarez Martinez	
