= Anthony Maldonado (cyclist) =

French cyclist (born 1991)

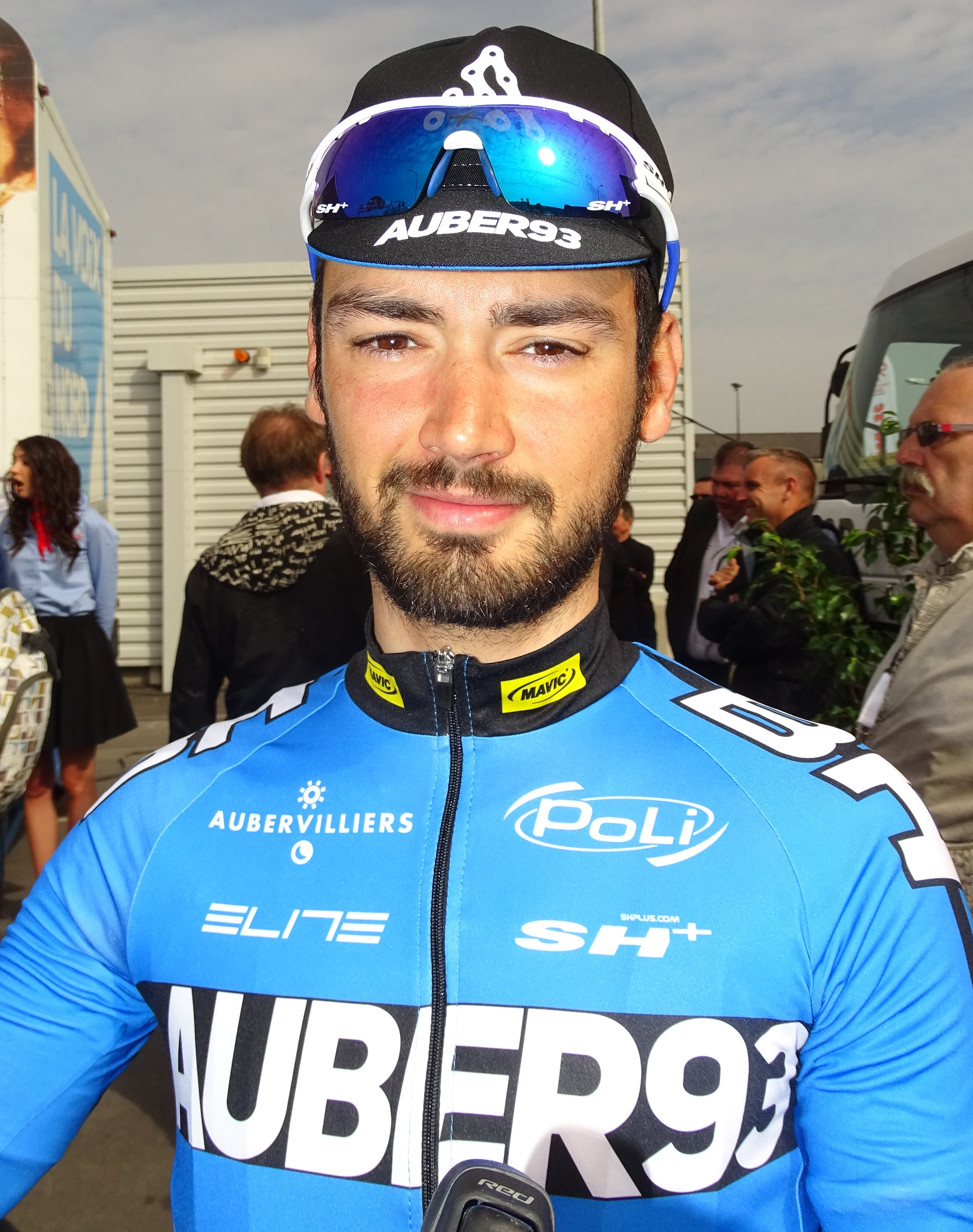
- Maldonado at the 2015 Grand Prix de Denain

Personal information
- Full name: Anthony Maldonado
- Born: 9 April 1991 (age 35) Puyricard, France
- Height: 1.75 m (5 ft 9 in)
- Weight: 57 kg (126 lb)

Cycling career
- Sport: Cycling
- Current team: Retired
- Discipline: Road
- Role: Rider

Amateur teams
- 2010: Vélo-Club La Pomme Marseille
- 2011–2012: Martigues SC
- 2013–2014: AVC Aix-en-Provence

Professional team
- 2015–2023: Auber 93

Anthony Maldonado (born 9 April 1991) is a French former racing cyclist, who competed as a professional from 2015 to 2023 for UCI Continental team St. Michel–Mavic–Auber93.

== Major results ==
2012
7th Overall Okolo Jižních Čech
2013
3rd Road race, Jeux de la Francophonie
10th Road race, Mediterranean Games
2014
8th Overall Tour du Loir-et-Cher
2015
10th La Roue Tourangelle
2016
9th La Drôme Classic
10th Polynormande
10th Route Adélie
2017
5th La Drôme Classic
7th Grand Prix de la Ville de Lillers
8th Overall Tour La Provence
2018
1st Overall Circuit des Ardennes

1st Points classification

4th Paris–Troyes
8th Cholet-Pays de la Loire
9th Route Adélie
2019
1st Overall Ronde de l'Oise

1st Stage 2

8th Cholet-Pays de la Loire
9th Paris–Bourges
2020
8th Paris–Camembert
10th Grand Prix La Marseillaise
10th Tour du Doubs
2021
9th Classic Grand Besançon Doubs
10th Grand Prix de la ville de Nogent-sur-Oise
