= Crystal Bicycle =

The "Kristallen Fiets" (Dutch for "Crystal Bicycle") is a cycle racing award, created in 1992 by the Belgian newspaper Het Laatste Nieuws. The award is given annually to the Belgian rider considered to have performed the best over the year.

As of 2013, Johan Museeuw holds the record, winning the award five times. Only two cyclo-cross riders have won the award, Paul Herygers and Sven Nys, although Wout van Aert also won the trophy twice after already having shifted focus to road racing.

Other categories have been introduced at later stages, including the Best Young Rider award in 1994, the Best Cycling Manager award in 2000, the best domestique award in 2005 (commonly referred to as the Crystal Drop of Sweat), the Best Female Rider in 2016, and finally the Best Young Female Rider in 2023.

== Recipients ==
Year	Crystal Bicycle (men)	Best Young Rider (men)	Best Manager	Crystal Drop of Sweat (Best Helper)	Crystal Bicycle (women)	Best Young Rider (women)
1992	Dirk De Wolf	Not Awarded	Not Awarded	Not Awarded	Not Awarded	Not Awarded
1993	Johan Museeuw	Not Awarded	Not Awarded	Not Awarded	Not Awarded	Not Awarded
1994	Paul Herygers	Kristof Trouvé	Not Awarded	Not Awarded	Not Awarded	Not Awarded
1995	Johan Museeuw	Leif Hoste	Not Awarded	Not Awarded	Not Awarded	Not Awarded
1996	Johan Museeuw	Glenn D'Hollander	Not Awarded	Not Awarded	Not Awarded	Not Awarded
1997	Johan Museeuw	Sven Nys	Not Awarded	Not Awarded	Not Awarded	Not Awarded
1998	Tom Steels	Sven Nys	Not Awarded	Not Awarded	Not Awarded	Not Awarded
1999	Frank Vandenbroucke	Kevin Hulsmans	Not Awarded	Not Awarded	Not Awarded	Not Awarded
2000	Andrei Tchmil	Jurgen Van Goolen	Patrick Lefevere & Johan Bruyneel	Not Awarded	Not Awarded	Not Awarded
2001	Rik Verbrugghe	Tom Boonen	Jef Braeckevelt	Not Awarded	Not Awarded	Not Awarded
2002	Johan Museeuw	Kevin De Weert	Johan Bruyneel	Not Awarded	Not Awarded	Not Awarded
2003	Peter Van Petegem	Johan Vansummeren	Johan Bruyneel	Not Awarded	Not Awarded	Not Awarded
2004	Tom Boonen	Niels Albert	Patrick Lefevere	Not Awarded	Not Awarded	Not Awarded
2005	Tom Boonen	Niels Albert	José De Cauwer	Kevin Hulsmans	Not Awarded	Not Awarded
2006	Tom Boonen	Dominique Cornu	Patrick Lefevere	Gert Steegmans	Not Awarded	Not Awarded
2007	Sven Nys	Niels Albert	Johan Bruyneel	Johan Vansummeren	Not Awarded	Not Awarded
2008	Philippe Gilbert	Jan Bakelants	Johan Bruyneel	Mario Aerts	Not Awarded	Not Awarded
2009	Philippe Gilbert	Kris Boeckmans	Johan Bruyneel	Stijn Vandenbergh	Not Awarded	Not Awarded
2010	Philippe Gilbert	Yannick Eijssen	Marc Sergeant	Mario Aerts	Not Awarded	Not Awarded
2011	Philippe Gilbert	Tosh Van der Sande	John Lelangue	Jelle Vanendert	Not Awarded	Not Awarded
2012	Tom Boonen	Gijs Van Hoecke	Carlo Bomans	Kevin De Weert	Not Awarded	Not Awarded
2013	Sven Nys	Igor Decraene	Patrick Lefevere	Stijn Vandenbergh	Not Awarded	Not Awarded
2014	Greg Van Avermaet	Dylan Teuns	Walter Planckaert	Iljo Keisse	Not Awarded	Not Awarded
2015	Greg Van Avermaet	Laurens De Plus	Walter Planckaert	Iljo Keisse	Not Awarded	Not Awarded
2016	Greg Van Avermaet	Bjorg Lambrecht	Kevin De Weert	Iljo Keisse	Jolien D'Hoore	Not Awarded
2017	Greg Van Avermaet	Bjorg Lambrecht	Patrick Lefevere	Julien Vermote	Jolien D'Hoore	Not Awarded
2018	Victor Campenaerts	Remco Evenepoel	Patrick Lefevere	Tim Declercq	Nicky Degrendele	Not Awarded
2019	Remco Evenepoel	Ilan Van Wilder	Patrick Lefevere	Tim Declercq	Sanne Cant	Not Awarded
2020	Wout van Aert	Thibau Nys	Allan Peiper	Tim Declercq	Lotte Kopecky	Not Awarded
2021	Wout van Aert	Thibau Nys	Christoph Roodhooft; Philip Roodhooft	Tim Declercq	Lotte Kopecky	Not Awarded
2022	Remco Evenepoel	Alec Segaert	Sven Vanthourenhout	Tiesj Benoot	Lotte Kopecky	Not Awarded
2023	Remco Evenepoel	William Junior Lecerf	Christoph Roodhooft; Philip Roodhooft	Nathan Van Hooydonck	Lotte Kopecky	Julie De Wilde
2024	Remco Evenepoel	Jarno Widar	Sven Vanthourenhout	Justine Ghekiere	Lotte Kopecky	Fleur Moors
2025	Remco Evenepoel	Jarno Widar	Christoph Roodhooft; Philip Roodhooft	Victor Campenaerts	Lotte Kopecky	Lore De Schepper
