= Geert Omloop =

Belgian cyclist (born 1974)

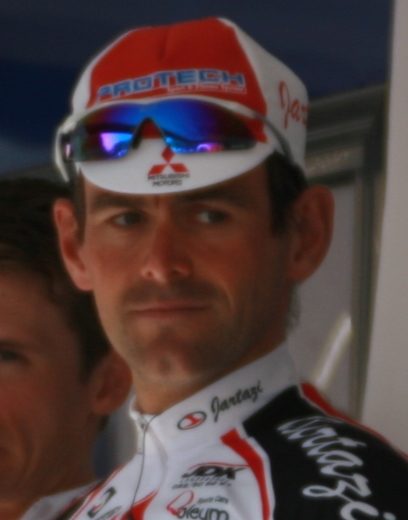

Personal information
- Full name: Geert Omloop
- Born: 12 February 1974 (age 52) Herentals, Belgium
- Height: 1.82 m (6 ft 0 in)
- Weight: 78 kg (172 lb)

Cycling career
- Sport: Cycling
- Current team: Retired
- Disciplines: Road; Track
- Role: Rider

Professional teams
- 1995: Rotan Spiessens–Hot Dog Louis (stagiaire)
- 1996: Pecaes–Bolato–Langrover
- 1996: Vosschemie–Zetelhallen (stagiaire)
- 1997: Team EC Bayer–Worringen
- 1998–1999: Spar–RDM
- 2000: Collstrop–De Federale Verzekeringen
- 2001–2003: Collstrop–Palmans
- 2004–2006: Mr. Bookmaker–Palmans–Collstrop
- 2007–2008: Jartazi–Promo Fashion
- 2009–2010: Palmans–Cras

Geert Omloop (born 12 February 1974) is a Belgian former professional road racing cyclist who was born in Herentals. He is the cousin of fellow cyclist Wim Omloop and the son of Marcel Omloop. He turned professional in 1997 having raced for several professional teams in 1995 and 1996 as a trainee. He became the Belgian National Road Race Champion in 2003, but lost the title in 2004 when he finished second.

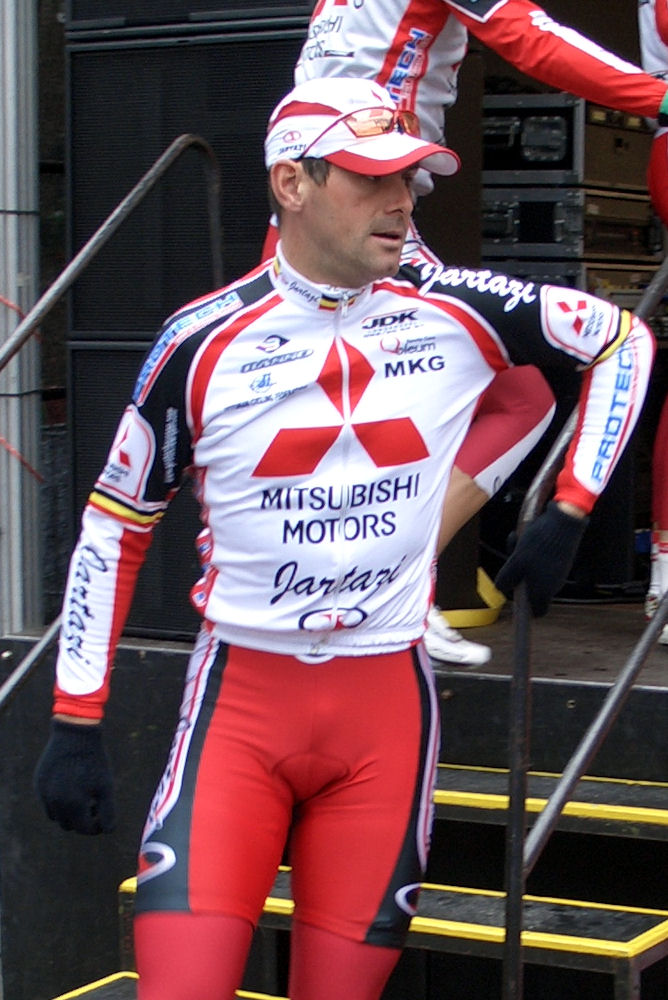
Geert Omloop

== Major results ==
1995
1st Stage 5 Tour de la province d'Anvers
8th Nationale Sluitingprijs
1996
1st Grote Prijs Stad Geel
5th Schaal Sels
1997
2nd Nationale Sluitingprijs
5th De Kustpijl
1999
1st Omloop van het Waasland
1st Omloop van de Vlaamse Scheldeboorden
2nd Omloop van de Westhoek
3rd GP Stad Vilvoorde
8th GP Stad Zottegem
2000
2nd Omloop van de Westhoek
2nd Zomergem–Adinkerke
3rd Grote 1-MeiPrijs
4th Overall Guldensporentweedaagse
4th Ronde van Midden-Zeeland
4th Kampioenschap van Vlaanderen
5th GP Stad Zottegem
7th GP Rudy Dhaenens
9th Le Samyn
2001
1st GP Rudy Dhaenens
1st Omloop van het Houtland
1st Grote 1-MeiPrijs
2nd GP Rik Van Steenbergen
2nd Delta Profronde
2nd Tour Beneden-Maas
3rd Grote Prijs Jef Scherens
5th Kampioenschap van Vlaanderen
8th Le Samyn
2002
1st Nationale Sluitingprijs
2nd ZLM Tour
2nd Henk Vos Memorial
3rd Tour de Vendée
3rd Grote 1-MeiPrijs
4th Vlaamse Havenpijl
7th Ronde van Midden-Zeeland
9th GP Stad Zottegem
2003
1st Road race, National Road Championships
1st Omloop van het Houtland
1st GP Stad Zottegem
1st Omloop van het Waasland
2nd Ronde van Midden-Zeeland
2nd Rund um den Flughafen Köln-Bonn
3rd Dwars door Gendringen
4th Brussels–Ingooigem
5th Omloop van de Vlaamse Scheldeboorden
5th Grote 1-MeiPrijs
6th Kampioenschap van Vlaanderen
8th Nationale Sluitingprijs
8th Kuurne–Brussels–Kuurne
9th Druivenkoers-Overijse
10th Schaal Sels
2004
1st GP Rudy Dhaenens
2nd Road race, National Road Championships
2nd GP de Villers-Cotterêts
5th Kuurne–Brussels–Kuurne
8th Overall Driedaagse van West-Vlaanderen
2005
1st Omloop Mandel-Leie-Schelde
2nd Schaal Sels
3rd Nokere Koerse
8th Memorial Rik Van Steenbergen
8th Tour de Rijke
9th Ronde van Noord-Holland
10th Flèche Hesbignonne
2006
4th De Drie Zustersteden
5th Overall Tour de Picardie
10th Nationale Sluitingprijs
2007
1st Gullegem Koerse
1st Grote Prijs Marcel Kint
1st Grote Prijs Beeckman-De Caluwé
2nd Omloop van het Waasland
4th Nationale Sluitingprijs
4th Grand Prix de Beuvry-la-Forêt
4th Internatie Reningelst
4th Omloop der Kempen
4th Classic Loire Atlantique
4th GP Briek Schotte
6th Nokere Koerse
9th Ronde van Drenthe
2008
1st Heistse Pijl
8th GP Briek Schotte
10th Ronde van Drenthe
2009
1st Ronde van het Groene Hart
1st Dwars door het Hageland
2nd Rund um Düren
9th Le Samyn
2010
2nd Ronde van Noord-Holland
6th Ronde van het Groene Hart
