= 2001 Grote Prijs Jef Scherens =

Race details
- Dates: 2 September 2001
- Stages: 1
- Distance: 195 km (121.2 mi)
- Winning time: 4h 36' 00"

Results
	Winner	Niko Eeckhout (BEL)
	Second	Björn Leukemans (BEL)
	Third	Geert Omloop (BEL)

The 2001 Grote Prijs Jef Scherens was the 35th edition of the Grote Prijs Jef Scherens cycle race and was held on 2 September 2001. The race started and finished in Leuven. The race was won by Niko Eeckhout.

== General classification ==
Final general classification

Rank	Rider	Time
1	Niko Eeckhout (BEL)	4h 36' 00"
2	Björn Leukemans (BEL)	+ 24"
3	Geert Omloop (BEL)	+ 1' 00"
4	Gert Vanderaerden (BEL)	+ 3' 22"
5	Glenn D'Hollander (BEL)	+ 3' 22"
6	Kristof Trouve (BEL)	+ 4' 04"
7	Bjørnar Vestøl (NOR)	+ 4' 07"
8	Bart Dockx (BEL)	+ 4' 07"
9	Manu L'Hoir (BEL)	+ 4' 07"
10	Wilfried Cretskens (BEL)	+ 4' 07"
