= 2018 Paris–Troyes =

- 2018 UCI Europe Tour

Race details
- Dates: 11 March 2018
- Stages: 1
- Distance: 180.3 km (112.0 mi)
- Winning time: 4h 29' 55"

Results
	Winner	Adrien Petit (FRA)	(Direct Énergie)
	Second	Lorrenzo Manzin (FRA)	(Vital Concept)
	Third	Damien Touzé (FRA)	(St. Michel–Auber93)

The 2018 Paris–Troyes was the 60th edition of Paris–Troyes road cycling one day race. It was part of UCI Europe Tour in category 1.2.

== Teams ==
Twenty-two teams were invited to take part in the race. These included five UCI Professional Continental teams and seventeen UCI Continental teams.

UCI Professional Continental teams

- Direct Énergie
- Fortuneo–Samsic
- Vital Concept
- Sport Vlaanderen–Baloise
- WB Aqua Protect Veranclassic

UCI Continental teams

- Roubaix–Lille Métropole
- St. Michel–Auber93
- Differdange–Losch
- Leopard Pro Cycling
- BHS–Almeborg Bornholm
- Team Vorarlberg Santic
- Joker Icopal
- Lotto–Soudal U23
- SCO Dijon
- VC Villefranche Beaujolais
- EFC-L&R-Vulsteke
- CC Nogent-sur-Oise
- CC Villeneuve Saint-Germain
- Team Peltrax-CS Dammarie-lès-Lys
- VC Toucy
- Charvieu-Chavagneux IC
- VC Saint-Quentin

== General classification ==
Result
Rank	Rider	Team	Time
1	Adrien Petit (FRA)	Direct Énergie	4h 29' 55"
2	Lorrenzo Manzin (FRA)	Vital Concept	+ 0"
3	Damien Touzé (FRA)	St. Michel–Auber93	+ 0"
4	Anthony Maldonado (FRA)	St. Michel–Auber93	+ 0"
5	Gerben Thijssen (BEL)	Lotto–Soudal U23	+ 0"
6	Bram Welten (NED)	Fortuneo–Samsic	+ 0"
7	Alexander Krieger (GER)	Leopard Pro Cycling	+ 0"
8	Jordan Levasseur (FRA)	VC Toucy	+ 0"
9	Olivier Pardini (BEL)	Differdange–Losch	+ 0"
10	Maxime De Poorter (BEL)	EFC-L&R-Vulsteke	+ 0"
