= Alexander Maes (cyclist) =

Belgian bicycle racer (1901–1973)

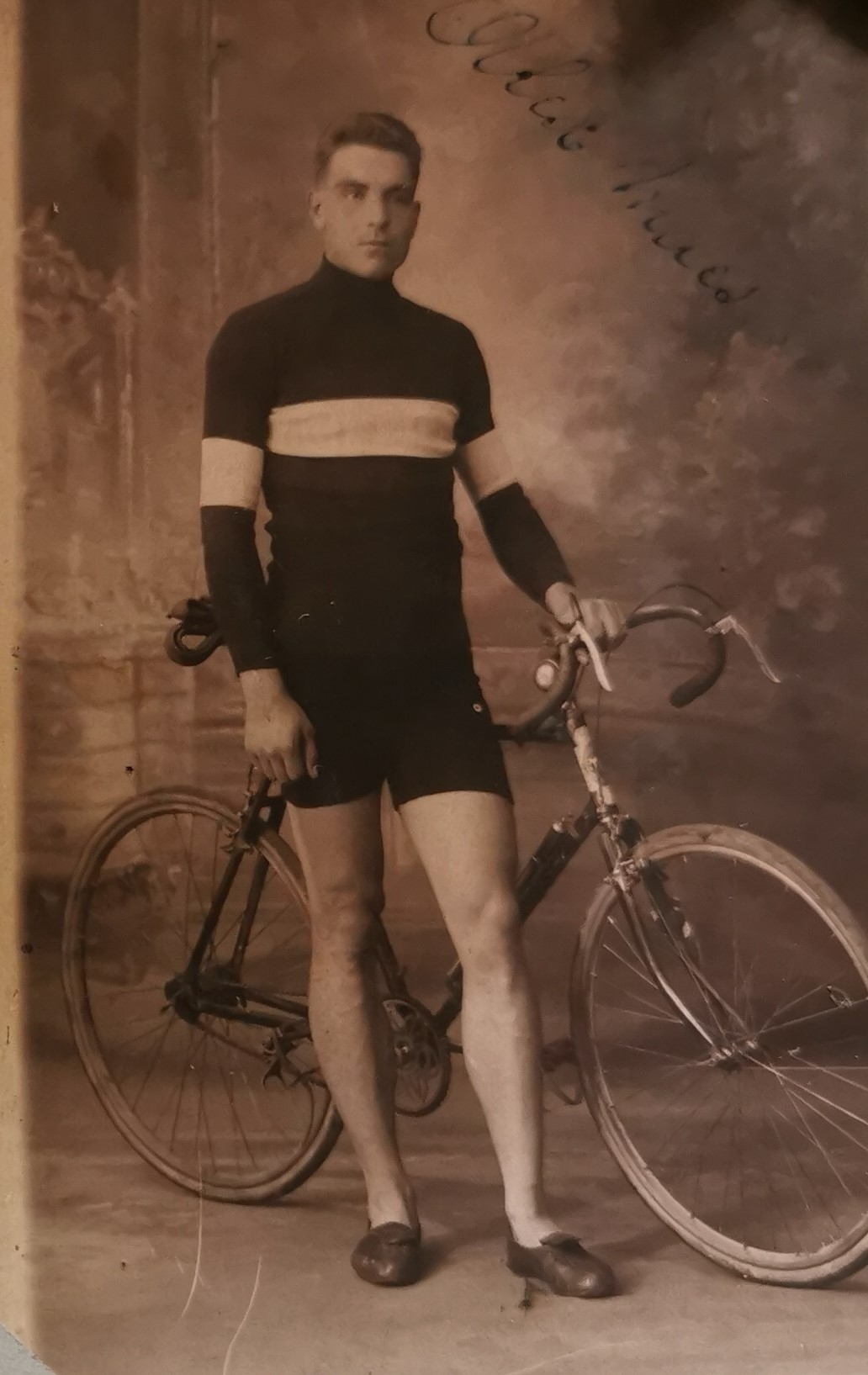
- Photo from family album (private collection)

Personal information
- Full name: Johannes Alexander Maes
- Born: 1 April 1901 Ekeren, Belgium
- Died: 30 December 1973 (aged 72) Zwijndrecht, Belgium

Cycling career
- Sport: Cycling
- Disciplines: Road; Track
- Role: Rider

Professional teams
- 1926: J.B. Louvet
- 1926–1927: Peugeot–Dunlop

Alexander Maes (Ekeren, 1 April 1901 – Zwijndrecht, 30 December 1973) was a Belgian bicycle racer.

(Johannes) Alexander Maes, son of Lambertus Maes and Anna Maria Teunen, was a refugee in the United Kingdom as a child during the First World War. He was a professional cyclist from 1924 to 1933. He competed in track cycling (6 days of Ghent and 6 days of Brussels) and road bicycle racing. During his professional career he had 9 individual victories, most of them during sprint finish races (Zwijndrecht in 1927, Lebbeke and Aalter in 1928 and the Grote Velokoers of Zottegem in 1930). His main successes include victories of Paris–Menin (1925), Circuit de l'Arvor (1927), Schaal Sels Merksem (1928), Grote 1-MeiPrijs (1928) and the inaugural Nationale Sluitingsprijs in 1929.

He notable rode for the Peugeot–Dunlop and J.B. Louvet teams. He participated twice in the Tour of Flanders (24th in 1926 and 28th in 1927).

After his cycling career he owned a sports pub in the vicinity of the Sportpaleis in Antwerp.

== Major results ==
1925
1st Paris–Menen
1928
1st Schaal Sels
1st Grote 1-MeiPrijs
4th Kampioenschap van Vlaanderen
1929
1st Nationale Sluitingprijs
