= Grand Prix Rudy Dhaenens =

Race details
- Date: Late March
- Region: East Flanders, Belgium
- Local name: Grand Prix Rudy Dhaenens (in Dutch)
- Discipline: Road
- Competition: UCI Europe Tour
- Type: One-day race

History
- First edition: 1999
- Editions: 9 (as of 2014)
- Final edition: 2007
- First winner: Hendrik Van Dijck (BEL)
- Most wins: Geert Omloop (BEL) (2 wins)
- Final winner: Jurgen Francois (BEL)

Grand Prix Rudy Dhaenens was a professional road bicycle race held annually in Nevele (Belgium) to honor the former World Racing Champion Rudy Dhaenens. In 2005 the race was organized as a 1.1 event on the UCI Europe Tour. The race was held as a National Event race in 2006.

== Winners ==
Year	Country	Rider	Team
1999	Belgium	Hendrik Van Dijck	
2000	Belgium	Niko Eeckhout	
2001	Belgium	Geert Omloop	
2002	Belgium	Wesley Van Speybroeck	
2003	France	Christophe Kern	
2004	Belgium	Geert Omloop	
2005	Belgium	Koen Barbé	
2006	Belgium	Filip Meirhaeghe	
2007	Belgium	Jurgen Francois	
