= Léo Vincent =

French cyclist

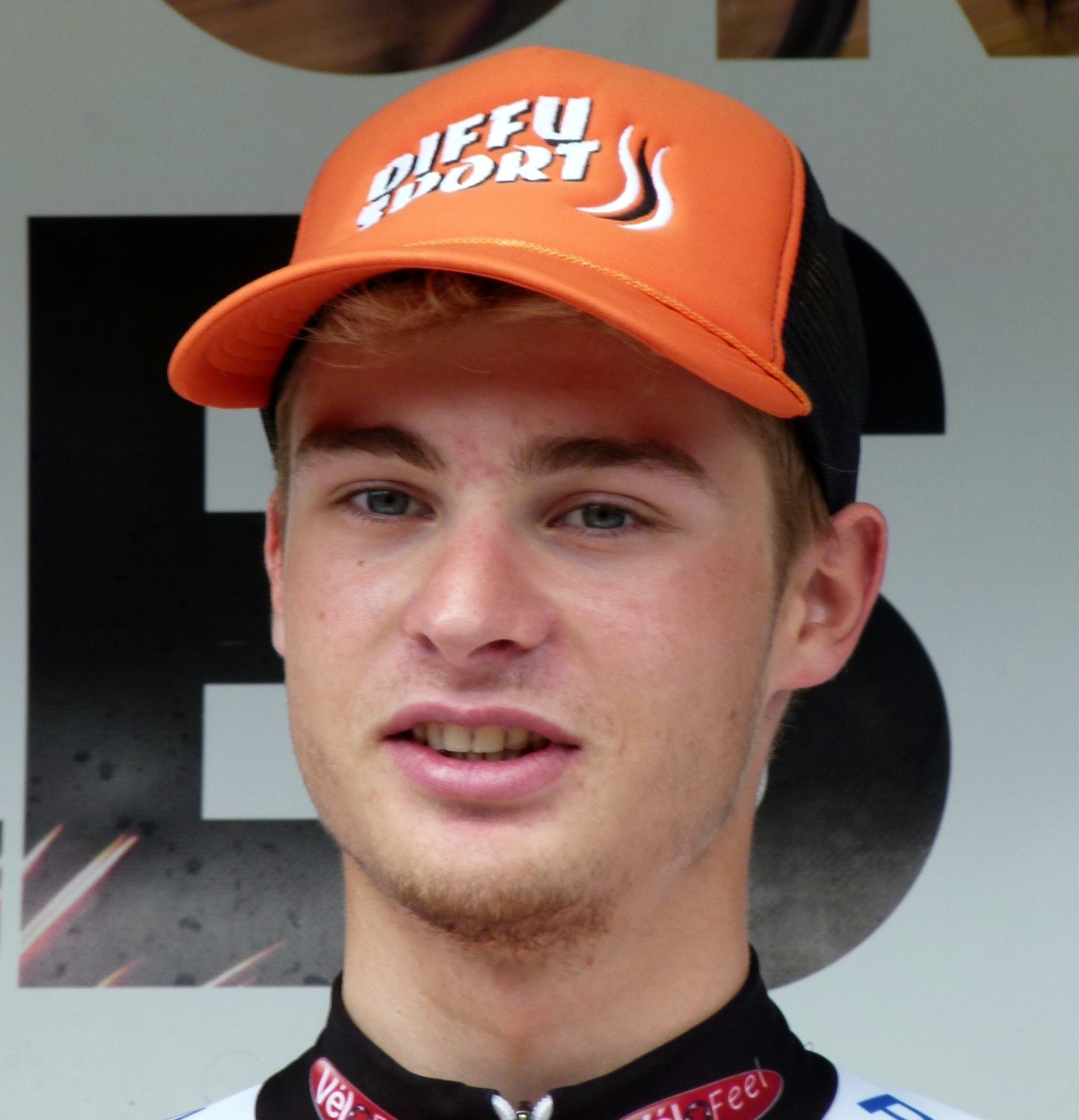
- Vincent in 2014

Personal information
- Full name: Léo Vincent
- Born: 6 November 1995 (age 30) Vesoul, France
- Height: 1.77 m (5 ft 10 in)
- Weight: 62 kg (137 lb)

Cycling career
- Sport: Cycling
- Current team: Retired
- Discipline: Road
- Role: Rider

Amateur teams
- 2014–2016: CC Étupes
- 2021: CC Étupes

Professional teams
- 2016: FDJ (stagiaire)
- 2017–2020: FDJ

Léo Vincent (born 6 November 1995) is a French former cyclist, who rode professionally for the Groupama–FDJ team, between 2017 and 2020. He competed in the 2018 Vuelta a España, finishing 77th overall.

== Major results ==
2015
1st Stage 4 Ronde de l'Isard
1st Stage 5 Tour des Pays de Savoie
2016
3rd Overall Ronde de l'Isard
4th Overall Tour des Pays de Savoie
2017
1st Young rider classification Tour La Provence

=== Grand Tour general classification results timeline ===
Grand Tour	2018
Giro d'Italia	—
Tour de France	—
Vuelta a España	77

Legend
—	Did not compete
DNF	Did not finish
