= Oliviero Troia =

Italian cyclist

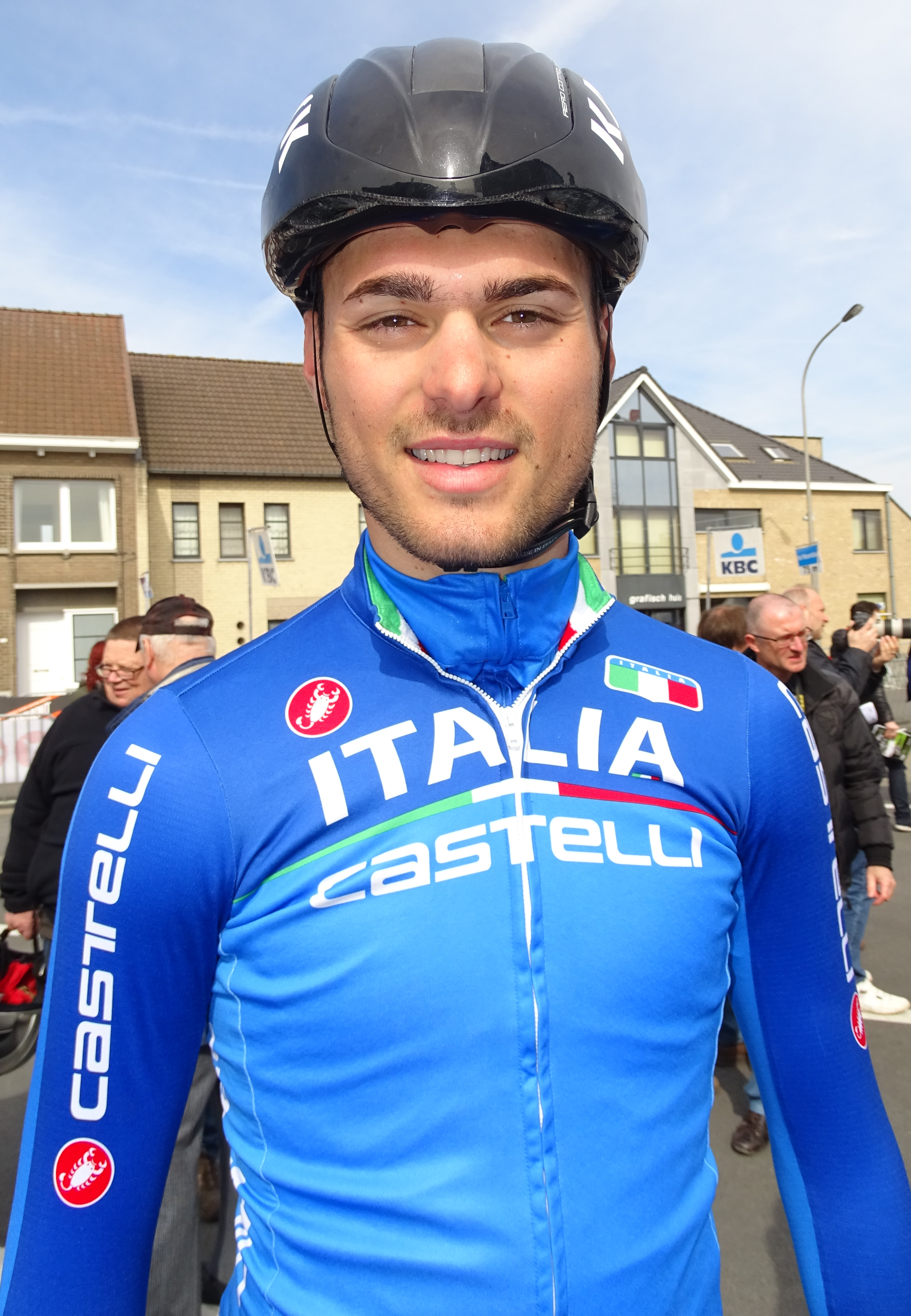
- Troia in 2016.

Personal information
- Full name: Oliviero Troia
- Born: 1 September 1994 (age 32) Bordighera, Liguria, Italy
- Height: 1.91 m (6 ft 3 in)
- Weight: 72 kg (159 lb; 11 st 5 lb)

Cycling career
- Sport: Cycling
- Discipline: Road
- Role: Rider

Amateur team
- 2013–2016: Team Colpack

Professional teams
- 2016: Lampre–Merida (stagiaire)
- 2017–2022: UAE Abu Dhabi

Oliviero Troia (born 1 September 1994) is an Italian cyclist, who last rode for UCI WorldTeam UAE Team Emirates. In July 2018, he was named in the start list for the Tour de France.

== Major results ==
2012
6th Road race, UEC European Junior Road Championships
9th Overall Giro della Lunigiana
2015
5th Trofeo Edil C
6th Trofeo Matteotti
2016
4th Ruota d'Oro
4th Paris–Roubaix Espoirs
2018
7th Coppa Bernocchi

=== Grand Tour general classification results timeline ===
| Grand Tour | 2018 | 2019 |
|---|---|---|
| Giro d'Italia | — | — |
| Tour de France | 133 | — |
| Vuelta a España | — | 150 |

Legend
| — | Did not compete |
| DNF | Did not finish |
