= Marc Fournier =

French cyclist

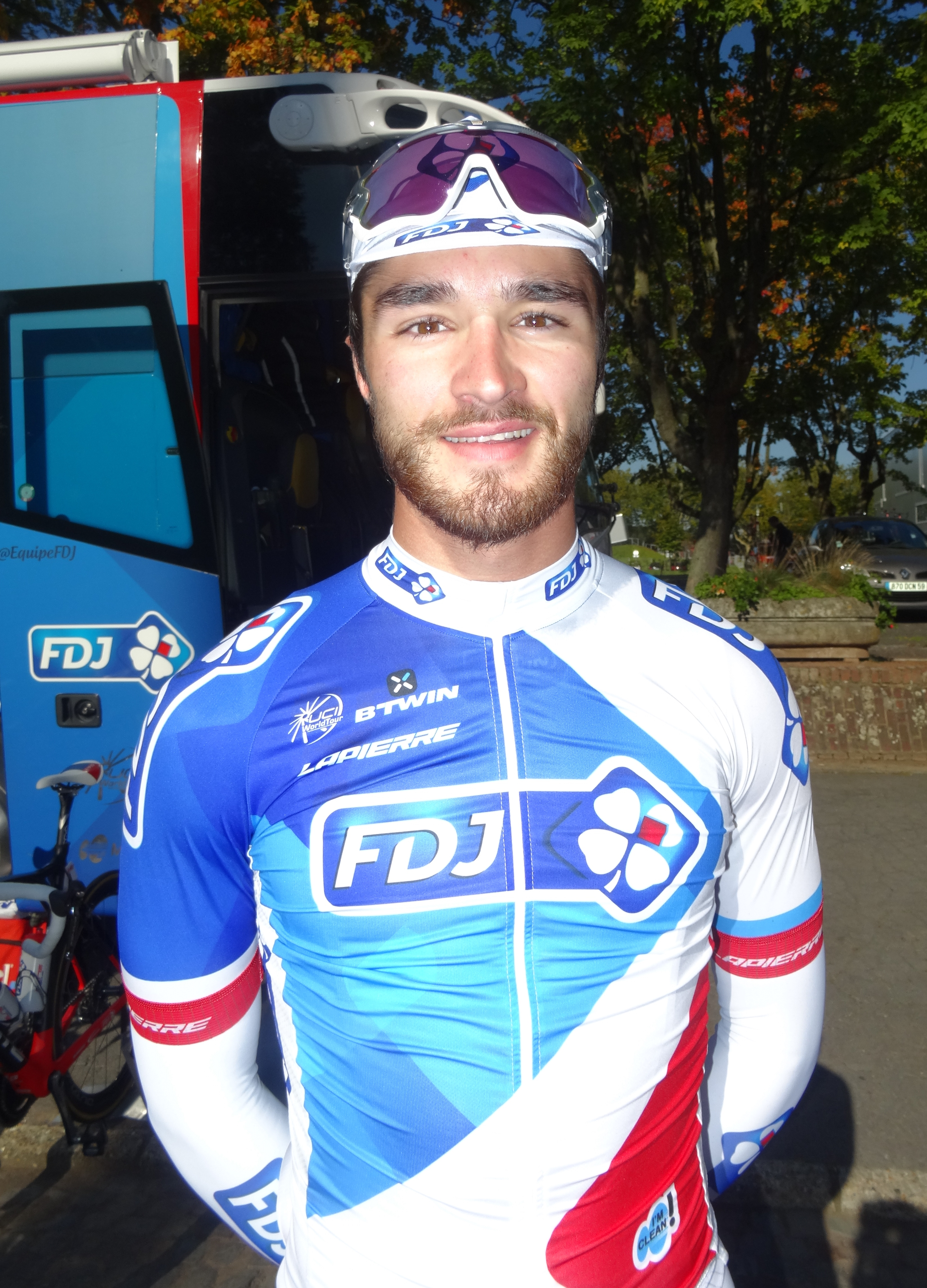
- Fournier in October 2015

Personal information
- Full name: Marc Fournier
- Born: 12 November 1994 (age 31) Alençon, France
- Height: 1.83 m (6 ft 0 in)
- Weight: 71 kg (157 lb)

Cycling career
- Sport: Cycling
- Current team: Retired
- Disciplines: Road; Track
- Role: Rider
- Rider type: Rouleur

Amateur teams
- 2011–2012: VC Saint-Lo Pont Hebert Junior
- 2013–2015: CC Nogent-sur-Oise

Professional teams
- 2015: FDJ (stagiaire)
- 2016–2017: FDJ
- 2018–2019: Vital Concept

Marc Fournier (born 12 November 1994 in Alençon) is a French former professional cyclist, who rode professionally between 2016 and 2019 for the FDJ and Vital Concept–B&B Hotels teams. He was named in the startlist for the 2017 Vuelta a España.

== Major results ==
2012
3rd Road race, National Junior Road Championships
2013
2nd Overall Boucles de la Mayenne

1st Young rider classification

2015
1st Stage 1 Le Triptyque des Monts et Châteaux
2nd Time trial, National Under-23 Road Championships
9th Grand Prix de la ville de Nogent-sur-Oise
2016
1st Overall Circuit de la Sarthe

1st Young rider classification
1st Stage 1

3rd Duo Normand (with Johan Le Bon)

=== Grand Tour general classification results timeline ===
Grand Tour	2017
Giro d'Italia	—
Tour de France	—
Vuelta a España	DNF

Legend
—	Did not compete
DNF	Did not finish
