= 1998 UCI Road World Championships – Women's road race =

Women's Individual Road Race
1998 UCI Road World Championships
- Rainbow jersey

Race details
- Dates: 1998-10-10
- Stages: 1 in (Netherlands) Valkenburg (NED)
- Distance: 103.2 km (64.13 mi)
- Winning time: 02h 35' 35"

Results
| | Winner | (Lithuania) Diana Žiliūtė (LTU) |
| | Second | (Netherlands) Leontien van Moorsel (NED) |
| | Third | (Germany) Hanka Kupfernagel (GER) |

The Women's Individual Road Race at the 1998 UCI Road World Championships was held on Saturday October 10, 1998, in Valkenburg, Netherlands, over a total distance of 103.2 kilometres (6 x 17.2 km laps). There were a total of 121 starters, with 95 cyclists finishing the race.

== Final classification ==
| Rank | Rider | Time |
|---|---|---|
| 1st place, gold medalist(s) | Diana Žiliūtė (LTU) | 02:35:35 |
| 2nd place, silver medalist(s) | Leontien van Moorsel (NED) | — |
| 3rd place, bronze medalist(s) | Hanka Kupfernagel (GER) | — |
| 4. | Rasa Polikevičiūtė (LTU) | — |
| 5. | Alessandra Cappellotto (ITA) | — |
| 6. | Svitlana Hihilyeva (UKR) | — |
| 7. | Linda Jackson (CAN) | — |
| 8. | Gunn-Rita Dahle Flesjå (NOR) | — |
| 9. | Jeannie Longo-Ciprelli (FRA) | + 00.01 |
| 10. | Anna Wilson (AUS) | + 00.46 |
| 11. | Zita Urbonaitė (LTU) | — |
| 12. | Yvonne Schnorf (SUI) | — |
| 13. | Alison Sydor (CAN) | — |
| 14. | Jolanta Polikevičiūtė (LTU) | — |
| 15. | Edita Pučinskaitė (LTU) | — |
| 16. | Catherine Marsal (FRA) | — |
| 17. | Susanne Ljungskog (SWE) | — |
| 18. | Heidi Van De Vijver (BEL) | — |
| 19. | Elisabeth Chevanne (FRA) | — |
| 20. | Fabiana Luperini (ITA) | — |
| 21. | Zulfiya Zabirova (RUS) | + 00.49 |
| 22. | Monica Valen (NOR) | + 02.07 |
| 23. | Zinajda Stahurskaya (BLR) | — |
| 24. | Marcia Eicher-Vouets (SUI) | — |
| 25. | Bogumiła Matusiak (POL) | — |
| 26. | Mirjam Melchers (NED) | — |
| 27. | Dede Barry (USA) | — |
| 28. | Judith Arndt (GER) | — |
| 29. | Yvonne McGregor (GBR) | — |
| 30. | Rosa María Bravo (ESP) | — |
| 31. | Ingunn Bollerud (NOR) | — |
| 32. | Tracy Gaudry (AUS) | — |
| 33. | Geraldine Loewenguth (FRA) | — |
| 34. | Tatyana Kaverina (RUS) | — |
| 35. | Wenche Stensvold (NOR) | — |
| 36. | Valeria Cappellotto (ITA) | + 02.08 |
| 37. | Leigh Hobson (CAN) | — |
| 38. | Ragnhild Kostøl (NOR) | — |
| 39. | Lucille Hunkeler (SUI) | — |
| 40. | Svetlana Stepanova (RUS) | — |
| 41. | Fany Lecourtois (FRA) | — |
| 42. | Cindy Pieters (BEL) | — |
| 43. | Oksana Saprykina (UKR) | + 2.10 |
| 44. | Severine Desbouys (FRA) | + 2.11 |
| 45. | Jacqueline Brabenetz (GER) | + 2.15 |
| 46. | Mari Holden (USA) | + 2.54 |
| 47. | Roberta Bonanomi (ITA) | + 2.55 |
| 48. | Elsbeth Vink (NED) | — |
| 49. | Daniela Veronesi (SMR) | + 3.03 |
| 50. | Sara Felloni (ITA) | + 3.46 |
| 51. | Barbara Heeb (SUI) | + 4.08 |
| 52. | Nicole Brändli (SUI) | — |
| 53. | Chantal Beltman (NED) | + 4.17 |
| 54. | Sanna Lehtimäki (FIN) | — |
| 55. | Julie Young (USA) | — |
| 56. | Tamara Polyakova (UKR) | + 5.11 |
| 57. | Kerstin Scheitle (GER) | + 6.53 |
| 58. | Nicole Vermast (NED) | — |
| 59. | Jacinta Coleman (NZL) | + 6.54 |
| 60. | Petra Rossner (GER) | — |
| 61. | Ana Martínez (ESP) | — |
| 62. | Jorunn Kvalø (NOR) | — |
| 63. | Marie Høljer (SWE) | + 12.06 |
| 64. | Pia Sundstedt (FIN) | + 12.07 |
| 65. | Anke Erlank (RSA) | — |
| 66. | Yulia Martissova (RUS) | — |
| 67. | Luisiana Pegoraro (ITA) | + 12.39 |
| 68. | Miluse Flasková (CZE) | + 12.40 |
| 69. | Berta Fernández (ESP) | — |
| 70. | Natalya Kychtuk (UKR) | — |
| 71. | Els Pauwels (BEL) | — |
| 72. | Lisbeth Simper (DEN) | — |
| 73. | Sarah Ulmer (NZL) | + 13.47 |
| 74. | Rosalind Reekie-May (NZL) | + 15.22 |
| 75. | Yvonne Brunen (NED) | + 15.23 |
| 76. | Liuda Triabaite (LTU) | — |
| 77. | Joanna Lawn (NZL) | — |
| 78. | Elisabeth Tadich (AUS) | — |
| 79. | Maiken Jørgensen (DEN) | — |
| 80. | Sandra Missbach (GER) | — |
| 81. | Svetlana Potyomkina (RUS) | — |
| 82. | Natalya Yuganyuk (UKR) | — |
| 83. | Pamela Schuster (USA) | + 17.20 |
| 84. | Kristina Obrucová (CZE) | + 22.12 |
| 85. | Malgorzata Wysocka (POL) | + 23.16 |
| 86. | Tuija Kinnunen (FIN) | + 23.17 |
| 87. | Irini Tsouvala (GRE) | — |
| 88. | Ronel Van Wyck (RSA) | — |
| 89. | Monika Kotek (POL) | — |
| 90. | Lotte Schmidt (DEN) | — |
| 91. | Alena Barillová (SVK) | — |
| 92. | Sanne Schmidt (DEN) | — |
| 93. | Rikke Olsen (DEN) | + 23.23 |
| 94. | Lada Kozlíková (CZE) | + 31.54 |
| 95. | Larisa Chuyenka (BLR) | + 36.46 |
DID NOT FINISH
| | Simona Parente (ITA) | |
Juanita Feldhahn (AUS)
Kathryn Watt (AUS)
Karen Bliss-Livingston (USA)
Emily Robbins (USA)
Kendra Wenzel (USA)
Melina Rasmussen (DEN)
Valentiana Karpenko (UKR)
Lenka Ilavská (SVK)
Montserrat Alonso (ESP)
Rosa Cristina Vega (ESP)
Teodora Ruano (ESP)
Lyne Bessette (CAN)
Susan Palmer (CAN)
Svetlana Samokhvalova (RUS)
Sarka Vichová (CZE)
Sandra Wamplfer (SUI)
Megan Hughes (GBR)
Angela Hunter (GBR)
Louise Jones (GBR)
Maria Lawrence (GBR)
Sara Symington (GBR)
Karin Avenant (RSA)
Magdalena Day (RSA)
Claudia Saintagne (BRA)
DID NOT START
| | Fatma Galiulina (UZB) | |
