= 2009 UCI Road World Championships – Men's road race =

Men's Individual Road Race
2009 UCI Road World Championships
- Rainbow jersey

Race details
- Dates: September 27, 2009
- Stages: 1
- Distance: 262 km (162.8 mi)
- Winning time: 6h 56' 26"

Medalists
	Gold	Cadel Evans (AUS)	(Australia)
	Silver	Alexandr Kolobnev (RUS)	(Russia)
	Bronze	Joaquim Rodríguez (ESP)	(Spain)

The Men's Individual Road Race of the 2009 UCI Road World Championships cycling event took place on 27 September in Mendrisio, Switzerland. The course of 262 km consisted of nineteen laps around an undulating circuit. The pre-race favourites came from the strong Italian and Spanish national squads, with Damiano Cunego and Alejandro Valverde both considered possible contenders.

The race was won by Australian Cadel Evans, the first Australian victory in the World road race. Evans, who took his third victory of the season, moved clear from a group of nine riders on the final lap to win the race.

== Final classification ==
Rank	Rider	Country	Time
1	Cadel Evans	Australia	06h 56'26"
1	Alexandr Kolobnev	Russia	at 27"
1	Joaquim Rodríguez	Spain	s.t.
4	Samuel Sánchez	Spain	at 30"
5	Fabian Cancellara	Switzerland	s.t.
6	Philippe Gilbert	Belgium	at 51"
7	Matti Breschel	Denmark	s.t.
8	Damiano Cunego	Italy	s.t.
9	Alejandro Valverde	Spain	s.t.
10	Simon Gerrans	Australia	at 1'47"
11	Fabian Wegmann	Germany	s.t.
12	Kurt Asle Arvesen	Norway	s.t.
13	Chris Anker Sørensen	Denmark	at 1'59"
14	Johnny Hoogerland	Netherlands	at 2'02"
15	Óscar Freire	Spain	s.t.
16	Ivan Basso	Italy	s.t.
17	André Cardoso	Portugal	at 2'44"
18	Michael Barry	Canada	s.t.
19	Sergei Ivanov	Russia	s.t.
20	Karsten Kroon	Netherlands	at 2'50"
21	Filippo Pozzato	Italy	s.t.
22	Leonardo Duque	Colombia	s.t.
23	Koos Moerenhout	Netherlands	s.t.
24	Sylwester Szmyd	Poland	s.t.
25	Kevin De Weert	Belgium	s.t.
26	Alexander Vinokourov	Kazakhstan	s.t.
27	Vasil Kiryienka	Belarus	s.t.
28	Oliver Zaugg	Switzerland	s.t.
29	Sylvain Chavanel	France	s.t.
30	Ignatas Konovalovas	Lithuania	s.t.
31	Alexander Bocharov	Russia	s.t.
32	Tadej Valjavec	Slovenia	s.t.
33	Thomas Löfkvist	Sweden	s.t.
34	Sérgio Paulinho	Portugal	s.t.
35	Janez Brajkovič	Slovenia	s.t.
36	Robert Gesink	Netherlands	at 3'01"
37	Miguel Ángel Rubiano	Colombia	at 3'21"
38	Tom Boonen	Belgium	s.t.
39	Bert De Waele	Belgium	s.t.
40	Philip Deignan	Ireland	s.t.
41	Alessandro Ballan	Italy	s.t.
42	Daniel Moreno	Spain	s.t.
43	Jakob Fuglsang	Denmark	at 3'45"
44	Greg Van Avermaet	Belgium	s.t.
45	Kim Kirchen	Luxembourg	at 4'20"
46	Pierrick Fédrigo	France	at 4'29"
47	Marcus Ljungqvist	Sweden	at 5'20"
48	Gorazd Štangelj	Slovenia	s.t.
49	Jussi Veikkanen	Finland	s.t.
50	José Rujano	Venezuela	s.t.
51	Eduard Vorganov	Russia	s.t.
52	Steve Cummings	Great Britain	s.t.
53	Andriy Hryvko	Ukraine	s.t.
54	Kristjan Fajt	Slovenia	s.t.

Rank	Rider	Country	Time
55	Murilo Fischer	Brazil	at 5'20"
56	Kanstantsin Sivtsov	Belarus	s.t.
57	Fumiyuki Beppu	Japan	s.t.
58	Assan Bazayev	Kazakhstan	s.t.
59	Craig Lewis	United States	s.t.
60	Edvald Boasson Hagen	Norway	s.t.
61	Christophe Riblon	France	s.t.
62	Przemysław Niemiec	Poland	s.t.
63	Nick Nuyens	Belgium	s.t.
64	Matthew Lloyd	Australia	at 6'07"
65	Luca Paolini	Italy	at 7'43"
66	Dmitry Fofonov	Kazakhstan	s.t.
67	Thomas Voeckler	France	s.t.
68	Dan Martin	Ireland	at 8'22"
69	Rui Costa	Portugal	s.t.
70	Vladimir Miholjević	Croatia	at 10'54"
71	Stefano Garzelli	Italy	s.t.
72	Oleksandr Kvachuk	Ukraine	s.t.
73	Bartosz Huzarski	Poland	s.t.
74	José Serpa	Colombia	s.t.
75	Carlos José Ochoa	Venezuela	s.t.
76	Hrvoje Miholjević	Croatia	s.t.
77	Aleksejs Saramotins	Latvia	s.t.
78	Fredrik Kessiakoff	Sweden	s.t.
79	Grischa Niermann	Germany	s.t.
80	Timmy Duggan	United States	s.t.
81	Stian Remme	Norway	s.t.
82	Michael Albasini	Switzerland	s.t.
83	Franklin Chacón	Venezuela	s.t.
84	Rene Mandri	Estonia	s.t.
85	Pavel Brutt	Russia	s.t.
86	Michał Gołaś	Poland	s.t.
87	Gabriel Rasch	Norway	s.t.
88	Maarten Wijnants	Belgium	s.t.
89	Maxime Monfort	Belgium	s.t.
90	Martin Velits	Slovakia	s.t.
91	Lars Boom	Netherlands	s.t.
92	Roger Hammond	Great Britain	s.t.
93	Christophe Le Mével	France	s.t.
94	Tom Peterson	United States	s.t.
95	Dimitri Champion	France	s.t.
96	Hayden Roulston	New Zealand	s.t.
97	Maxim Iglinsky	Kazakhstan	s.t.
98	Jason McCartney	United States	s.t.
99	Johannes Fröhlinger	Germany	s.t.
100	Peter Velits	Slovakia	s.t.
101	Rigoberto Urán	Colombia	s.t.
102	Gerhard Trampusch	Austria	at 14'03"
103	Paul Martens	Germany	s.t.
104	Volodymyr Zagorodniy	Ukraine	s.t.
105	Vladimir Karpets	Russia	s.t.
106	Jan Bárta	Czech Republic	s.t.
107	Michael Rogers	Australia	s.t.
108	Juan Carlos López Marin	Colombia	s.t.

=== Riders who did not finish ===
89 riders failed to finish the race.

Rider	Country
Martín Garrido	Argentina
Alfredo Lucero	Argentina
Matías Médici	Argentina
Simon Clarke	Australia
Allan Davis	Australia
Mathew Hayman	Australia
Stuart O'Grady	Australia
Wesley Sulzberger	Australia
Christoph Sokoll	Austria
Peter Wrolich	Austria
Aliaksandr Kuschynski	Belarus
Francis De Greef	Belgium
Tiago Fiorilli	Brazil
Magno Nazaret	Brazil
Ryder Hesjedal	Canada
Svein Tuft	Canada
Carlos Oyarzún	Chile
Mauricio Ardila	Colombia
Andrey Amador	Costa Rica
Matija Kvasina	Croatia
Roman Kreuziger	Czech Republic
Martin Mareš	Czech Republic
Lars Bak	Denmark
Frank Høj	Denmark
Anders Lund	Denmark
Rein Taaramäe	Estonia
Janek Tombak	Estonia
Gerald Ciolek	Germany
André Greipel	Germany
Christian Knees	Germany

Rider	Country
Tony Martin	Germany
Marcel Sieberg	Germany
Russell Downing	Great Britain
Chris Froome	Great Britain
Daniel Lloyd	Great Britain
David Millar	Great Britain
Ian Stannard	Great Britain
Ben Swift	Great Britain
Geraint Thomas	Great Britain
Istvan Cziraki	Hungary
Gergely Ivanics	Hungary
Péter Kusztor	Hungary
Nicolas Roche	Ireland
Marzio Bruseghin	Italy
Michele Scarponi	Italy
Giovanni Visconti	Italy
Yukiya Arashiro	Japan
Taiji Nishitani	Japan
Valentin Iglinskiy	Kazakhstan
Andrey Kashechkin	Kazakhstan
Oļegs Meļehs	Latvia
Laurent Didier	Luxembourg
Jempy Drucker	Luxembourg
Andy Schleck	Luxembourg
Dan Craven	Namibia
Sebastian Langeveld	Netherlands
Timothy Gudsell	New Zealand
Roy Hegreberg	Norway
Thor Hushovd	Norway

Rider	Country
Lars Petter Nordhaug	Norway
Håvard Nybø	Norway
Frederik Wilmann	Norway
Jacek Morajko	Poland
Maciej Paterski	Poland
Guennadi Mikhailov	Russia
Evgeny Popov	Russia
Alexander Porsev	Russia
Žolt Dér	Serbia
Esad Hasanović	Serbia
Nebojša Jovanović	Serbia
Ján Valach	Slovakia
Grega Bole	Slovenia
Borut Božič	Slovenia
Jay Robert Thomson	South Africa
Carlos Barredo	Spain
Juan José Cobo	Spain
Rubén Plaza	Spain
Rubens Bertogliati	Switzerland
Mathias Frank	Switzerland
Grégory Rast	Switzerland
Serhiy Honchar	Ukraine
Ruslan Pidgornyy	Ukraine
Volodymyr Starchyk	Ukraine
Andrew Bajadali	United States
Brent Bookwalter	United States
Tom Danielson	United States
Tyler Farrar	United States
Fabricio Ferrari	Uruguay
Manuel Medina	Venezuela

== Nation qualification ==
14 to be enrolled, 9 to start
Spain
Italy
Belgium
Germany
Luxembourg
Australia
United States
Great Britain
Russia
Norway
9 to be enrolled, 6 to start
South Africa
Colombia
Venezuela
Kazakhstan
France
Netherlands
Slovenia
Poland
Ukraine
Denmark
Switzerland
5 to be enrolled, 3 to start
Tunisia
Argentina
Canada
Brazil
Japan
Iran
Portugal
Estonia
Austria
Croatia
Hungary
Sweden
Latvia
Serbia
New Zealand
Czech Republic
Ireland
Slovakia
Belarus
2 to be enrolled, 1 to start
Lithuania
Finland
Namibia
Cuba
Chile
Costa Rica
Ecuador
Uruguay
Bulgaria
