= 1997 UCI Road World Championships – Women's time trial =

Women's time trial
1997 UCI Road World Championships
- Rainbow jersey

Race details
- Dates: 8 October 1997 in San Sebastián (ESP)
- Stages: 1
- Distance: 28 km (17 mi)
- Winning time: 39' 15"

Medalists
	Gold	Jeannie Longo (FRA)
	Silver	Zulfiya Zabirova (RUS)
	Bronze	Judith Arndt (GER)

The Women's time trial at the 1997 UCI Road World Championships took place in San Sebastián, Spain on 8 October 1997.

== Final classification ==
Rank	Rider	Country	Time
1st place, gold medalist(s)	Jeannie Longo	France	39' 15"
2nd place, silver medalist(s)	Zulfiya Zabirova	Russia	+ 0"
3rd place, bronze medalist(s)	Judith Arndt	Germany	+ 29"
4	Hanka Kupfernagel	Germany	+ 39"
5	Elizabeth Emery	United States	+ 57"
6	Catherine Marsal	France	+ 1' 08"
7	Mari Holden	United States	+ 1' 17"
8	Linda Jackson	Canada	+ 1' 21"
9	Zinaida Stahurskaya	Belarus	+ 1' 31"
10	Alessandra Cappellotto	Italy	+ 1' 31"
11	Jolanta Polikevičiūtė	Lithuania	+ 1' 40"
12	Valentina Polkhanova	Russia	+ 1' 49"
13	Kathy Watt	Australia	+ 2' 12"
14	Elena Tchalykh	Russia	+ 2' 32"
15	Lynette Nixon	Australia	+ 2' 35"
16	Monica Valvik-Valen	Norway	+ 2' 41"
17	Yvonne McGregor	United Kingdom	+ 2' 42"
18	Liuda Triabaitė	Lithuania	+ 2' 48"
19	Lenka Ilavská	Slovakia	+ 2' 49"
20	Tatiana Stiajkina	Ukraine	+ 2' 57"
21	Tuija Kinnunen	Finland	+ 2' 59"
22	Barbara Heeb	Switzerland	+ 3' 07"
23	Bogumiła Matusiak	Poland	+ 3' 09"
24	Gabriella Pregnolato	Italy	+ 3' 12"
25	Anke Erlank	South Africa	+ 3' 39"
26	Susanne Ljungskog	Sweden	+ 3' 40"
27	Jorunn Kvalø	Norway	+ 3' 42"
28	Meike de Bruijn	Netherlands	+ 3' 45"
29	Kristina Obrucova	Czech Republic	+ 3' 49"
30	Maxine Johnson	United Kingdom	+ 3' 59"
31	Marie Höljer	Sweden	+ 4' 06"
32	Chantal Beltman	Netherlands	+ 4' 29"
33	Izasqun Bengoa	Spain	+ 4' 41"
34	Marcia Eicher-Vouets	Switzerland	+ 4' 55"
35	Annie Gariepy	Canada	+ 5' 06"
36	Annelie Colyn	South Africa	+ 5' 38"
37	Olena Boudovitska	Ukraine	+ 5' 57"
38	Brigitte Krebs	Austria	+ 6' 31"
39	Marta Vilajosana	Spain	+ 6' 36"
