= Sven Erik Bystrøm =

Norwegian racing cyclist

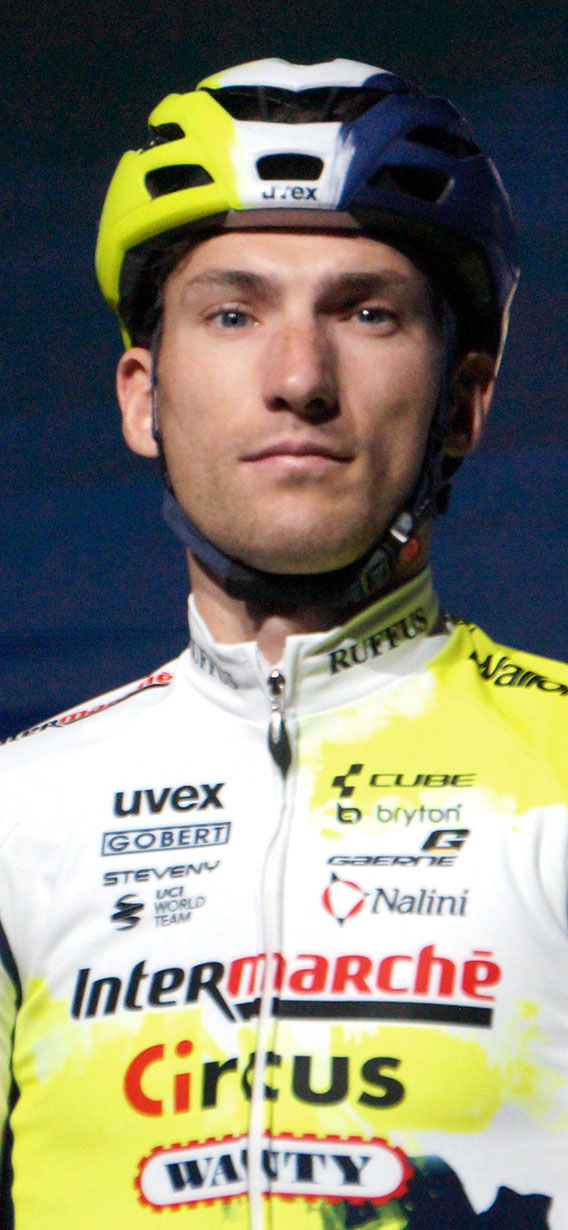
- Bystrøm in 2023

Personal information
- Full name: Sven Erik Bystrøm
- Born: 21 January 1992 (age 34) Haugesund, Norway
- Height: 1.89 m (6 ft 2 1/2 in)
- Weight: 70 kg (154 lb; 11 st 0 lb)

Cycling career
- Sport: Cycling
- Current team: Groupama–FDJ United
- Disciplines: Road; Track
- Role: Rider

Amateur team
- 2012–2014: Team Øster Hus–Ridley

Professional teams
- 2014: Team Katusha (stagiaire)
- 2015–2017: Team Katusha
- 2018–2021: UAE Team Emirates
- 2022–2023: Intermarché–Wanty–Gobert Matériaux
- 2024–2025: Groupama–FDJ
- 2026–: Uno-X Mobility

Major wins
- One-day races and Classics National Road Race Championships (2020)
Medal record
Representing Norway
Men's road bicycle racing
World Championships
Gold medal – first place	2014 Ponferrada	Under-23 road race

Sven Erik Bystrøm (born 21 January 1992, in Haugesund) is a Norwegian road bicycle racer, who currently rides for UCI WorldTeam Uno-X Mobility. He was the 2014 Under-23 World Road Race Champion.

He signed with the Continental level Team Øster Hus–Ridley in 2012. He signed for Team Katusha as a trainee from August 2014, with a full professional contract from 2015. He was named in the startlist for the 2016 Vuelta a España. He also started the 2017 Vuelta a Espana but crashed out with a broken shoulder on stage 7.

In 2018, he joined UAE Team Emirates on an initial two-year contract. In July 2019, he was named in the startlist for the 2019 Tour de France.

== Major results ==
2009
1st Overall Grenland Grand Prix

1st Stage 2

2nd Ringerike GP Juniors
2nd U6 Cycle Tour Tidaholm Juniors
2010
3rd Road race, National Junior Road Championships
10th Overall Regio-Tour Juniors

1st Stage 3

2011
5th Himmerland Rundt
2012
1st Eschborn-Frankfurt City Loop U23
2nd Road race, National Under-23 Road Championships
8th Rogaland GP
2013
3rd Road race, National Under-23 Road Championships
4th Baronie Breda Classic
7th Ringerike GP
2014
1st Road race, UCI Road World Under-23 Championships
2nd Ringerike GP
3rd Eschborn-Frankfurt City Loop U23
6th Hadeland GP
6th Baronie Breda Classic
7th ZLM Tour
9th Ronde van Drenthe
10th Overall Tour of Norway
10th Overall Tour des Fjords
10th Ronde van Vlaanderen U23
2015
1st Prologue (TTT) Tour of Austria
1st Young rider classification, Circuit Cycliste Sarthe
2016
7th Le Samyn
8th Overall Tour of Qatar
2017
2nd Road race, National Road Championships
2020
1st Road race, National Road Championships
2021
6th Trofeo Calvia
10th Overall Tour of Norway
2022
9th Overall Volta ao Algarve
Combativity award Stage 2 Tour de France
2023
National Road Championships

4th Road race
4th Time trial

7th Overall Tour Down Under
2025
9th Overall Arctic Race of Norway

=== Grand Tour general classification results timeline ===
Grand Tour	2016	2017	2018	2019	2020	2021	2022	2023	2024	2025
Giro d'Italia	—	—	—	—	—	—	—	DNF	—	130
Tour de France	—	—	—	110	—	—	93	—	—	—
Vuelta a España	141	DNF	113	—	—	—	—	—	117	—

Legend
—	Did not compete
DNF	Did not finish
