= Norwegian National Road Race Championships =

National road cycling championship in Norway

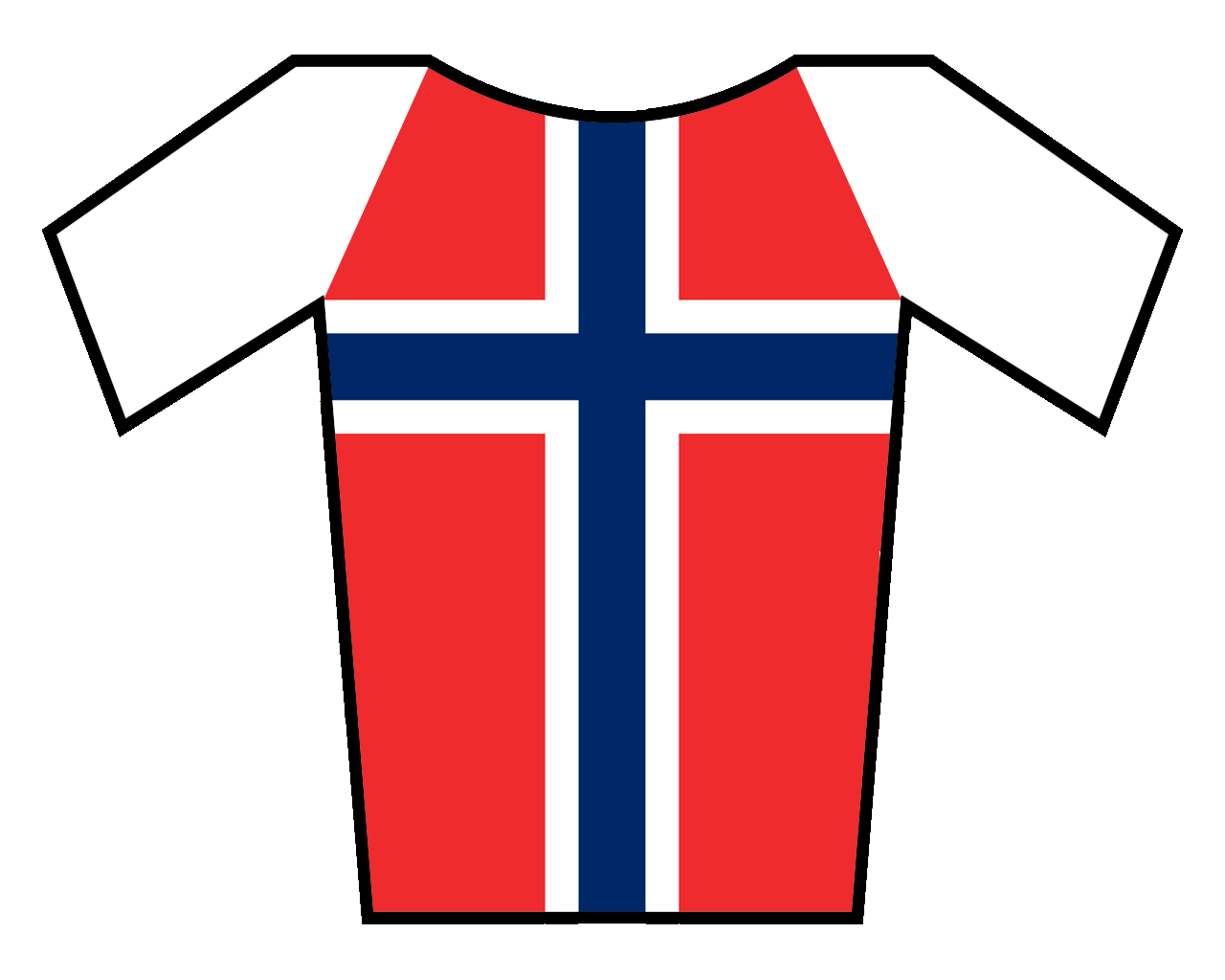
The Champion's Jersey

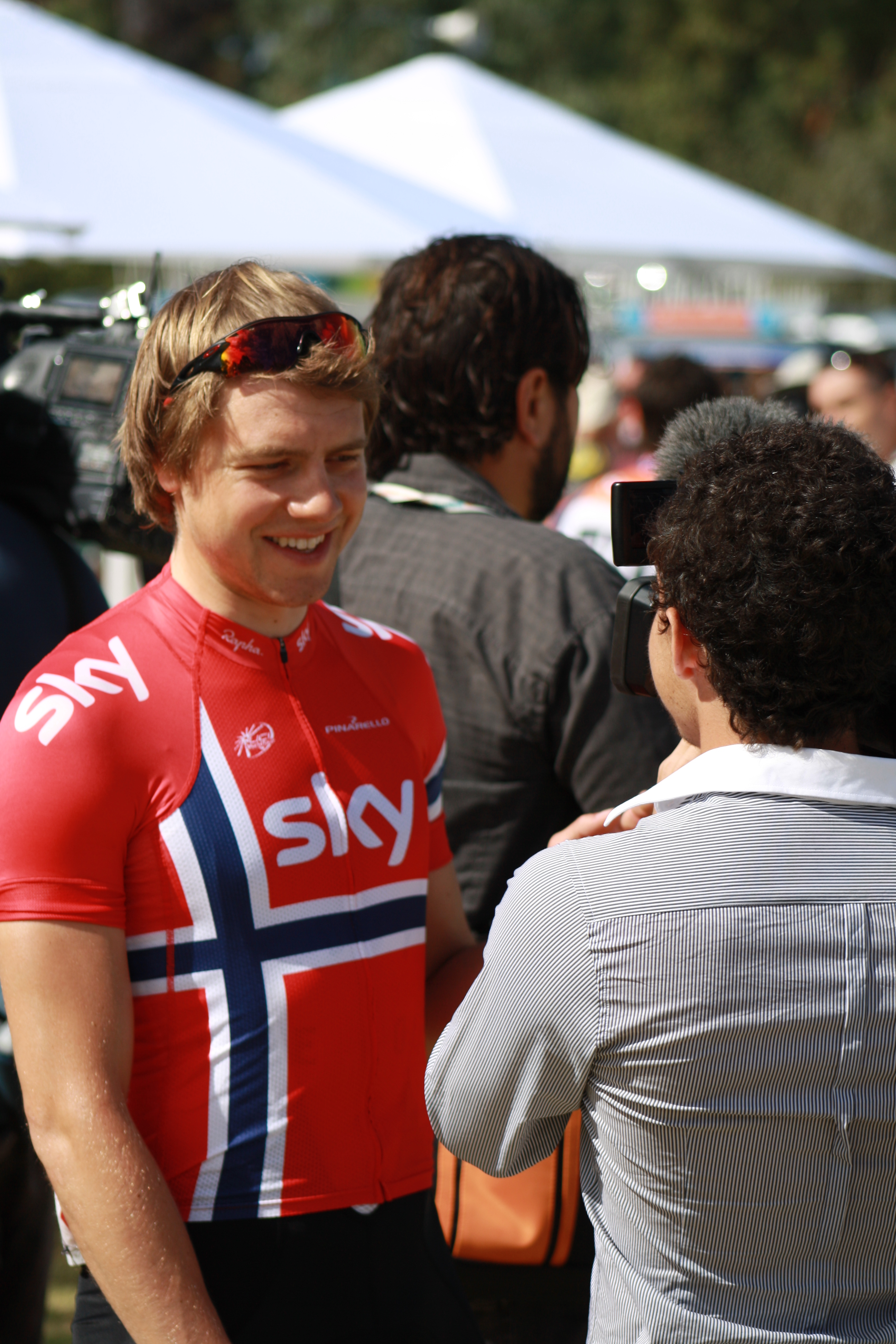
Edvald Boasson Hagen, pictured in 2013, has won the men's title on three occasions

The Norwegian National Road Race Championships, have been held annually with an event for each category of rider; Men, Women, junior riders & under 23 riders, since 1946. The event also includes the Norwegian National Time Trial Championships and the Norwegian National Criterium Championships.

The winners of each event are awarded with a symbolic cycling jersey featuring the Norwegian flag on the chest, which can be worn by the rider at other road racing events in the country to show their status as national champion. The champion's stripes can be combined into a sponsored rider's team kit design for this purpose.

== Men ==
=== Elite ===
Norwegian National Road Race Championships – Men's elite race
Race details
- Region: Norway
- Discipline: Road bicycle racing
- Type: One-day

History
- First edition: 1940
- First winner: Odd Westbye
- Most wins: Kurt Asle Arvesen (5 wins)
- Most recent: Markus Hoelgaard

Year	Gold	Silver	Bronze
1940	Odd Westbye		
1941– 1945	Not held due to World War II		
1946	Leif Ekås		
1947	Erling Kristiansen		
1948	Per Thorkildsen		
1949	Erling Kristiansen (2)		
1950	Arild Andersen		
1951	Odd Berg		
1952	Odd Berg (2)		
1953	Erling Kristiansen (3)		
1954	Kjell Pedersen		
1955	Odd Berg (3)		
1956	Kåre Vårvik		
1957	Aage Kjelstrup		
1958	Kjell Pedersen (2)		
1959	Trygve Lullau		
1960	Per Digerud		
1961	Per Digerud (2)		
1962	Fredrik Kveil		
1963	Fredrik Kveil (2)		
1964	Per Digerud (3)		
1965	Cato Nordbeck		
1966	Karl Helland		
1967	Tore Milsett		
1968	Tore Milsett (2)		
1969	Thorleif Andresen		
1970	Tom Martin Biseth		
1971	Thorleif Andresen (2)		
1972	Knut Knudsen		
1973	Knut Knudsen (2)		
1974	Tom Martin Biseth (2)		
1975	Svein Langholm		
1976	Magne Orre		
1977	Geir Digerud		
1978	Geir Digerud (2)		
1979	Geir Digerud (3)		
1980	Jon Rangfred Hanssen		
1981	Morten Sæther		
1982	Ole Kristian Silseth		
1983	Morten Sæther (2)		
1984	Dag Otto Lauritzen		
1985	Atle Pedersen		
1986	Atle Pedersen		
1987	Jørn Skaane		
1988	Erik Johan Sæbø		
1989	Finn Vegard Nordhagen		
1990	Bjørn Stenersen		
1991	Bo André Namtvedt		
1992	Dag Erik Pedersen		
1993	Johnny Sæther		
1994	Steffen Kjærgaard		
1995	Bo André Namtvedt		
1996	Frode Flesjå	Andrè Kjærgård	Trond Kristian Karlsen
1997	Kurt Asle Arvesen	Bjørnar Vestøl	Ole Sigurd Simensen
1998	Kurt Asle Arvesen (2)	Egil Andersen	Robertino Ivanov
1999	Svein Gaute Hølestøl	Mads Kaggestad	Øyvind Karlborn
2000	Rune Jogert	Bjørnar Vestøl	Gisle Vikøyr
2001	Erlend Engelsvoll	Gabriel Rasch	Morten Christiansen
2002	Kurt Asle Arvesen (3)	Steffen Kjærgaard	Thor Hushovd
2003	Gabriel Rasch	Morten Hegreberg	Roar Frøseth
2004	Thor Hushovd	Kurt Asle Arvesen	Morten Hegreberg
2005	Morten Christiansen	Andreas Sand	Morten Hegreberg
2006	Lars Petter Nordhaug	Edvald Boasson Hagen	Roy Hegreberg
2007	Alexander Kristoff	Thor Hushovd	Frederik Wilmann
2008	Kurt Asle Arvesen (4)	Stian Remme	Lars Petter Nordhaug
2009	Kurt Asle Arvesen (5)	Alexander Kristoff	Thor Hushovd
2010	Thor Hushovd (2)	Christer Rake	Roy Hegreberg
2011	Alexander Kristoff (2)	Vegard Stake Laengen	Thor Hushovd
2012	Edvald Boasson Hagen	Lars Petter Nordhaug	Alexander Kristoff
2013	Thor Hushovd (3)	Alexander Kristoff	Edvald Boasson Hagen
2014	Tormod Hausken Jacobsen	Filip Eidsheim	Odd Christian Eiking
2015	Edvald Boasson Hagen (2)	Odd Christian Eiking	Vegard Stake Laengen
2016	Edvald Boasson Hagen (3)	Alexander Kristoff	Kristoffer Halvorsen
2017	Rasmus Tiller	Sven Erik Bystrøm	Bjørnar Øverland
2018	Vegard Stake Laengen	Rasmus Tiller	Kristian Aasvold
2019	Amund Grøndahl Jansen	Andreas Leknessund	Carl Fredrik Hagen
2020	Sven Erik Bystrøm	Jonas Iversby Hvideberg	Carl Fredrik Hagen
2021	Tobias Foss	Anders Skaarseth	Kristian Aasvold
2022	Rasmus Tiller (2)	Alexander Kristoff	Edvald Boasson Hagen
2023	Fredrik Dversnes	Alexander Kristoff	Jonas Abrahamsen
2024	Markus Hoelgaard	Rasmus Tiller	Fredrik Dversnes
2025	Andreas Leknessund	Anders Halland Johannessen	Tobias Halland Johannessen
2026	Anders Skaarseth	Markus Hoelgaard	Jonas Abrahamsen

=== Under 23 ===
Year	Gold	Silver	Bronze
2003	Per Lund	Andreas Molandsveen	Roy Hegreberg
2004	Håvard Nybø		
2005	Lars Petter Nordhaug	Christopher Myhre	Svein Vold
2006	Anders Hvideberg		
2007	Frederik Wilmann	Stian Sommerseth	Edvald Boasson Hagen
2008	Ole Jensen	Håkon Stokka	Adrian Gjølberg
2009	Alexander Kristoff	Johan Fredrik Ziesler	Vegard Robinson Bugge
2010	Magnus Børresen	Vegard Robinson Bugge	Daniel Jarstø
2011	Vegard Robinson Bugge	Vegard Stake Laengen	Christian Hannestad
2012	August Jensen	Sven Erik Bystrøm	Max Emil Kørner
2013	Kristoffer Skjerping	Kristian Dyrnes	Sven Erik Bystrøm
2014	Sondre Holst Enger	Andreas Erland	Fredrik Strand Galta
2015	Odd Christian Eiking	Truls Korsæth	Anders Skaarseth
2016	Amund Grøndahl Jansen	Kristoffer Halvorsen	Markus Hoelgaard
2017	Anders Skaarseth	Torstein Træen	Rasmus Tiller
2018	Torjus Sleen	Iver Skaarseth	Syver Wærsted
2019	Idar Andersen	Andreas Staune-Mittet	Erik Ysland
2020	Martin Urianstad	Anders Halland Johannessen	Andreas Leknessund
2021	Tord Gudmestad	Tim Edvard Pettersen	Vebjørn Rønning
2022	Søren Wærenskjold	Johannes Staune-Mittet	Sebastian Larsen

=== Junior ===
Year	Gold	Silver	Bronze
1962	Arvid Sørensen		
1963	Bjarne Westmo		
1964	Jack Roar Johnsen		
1965	Bjarte Bruland		
1966	Arne Sporild		
1967	Knut Knudsen		
1968	Per Nilsen		
1969	Knut Bøe		
1970	Jan Martin Aaberg		
1971	Svein Langholm		
1972	Bjørn Bilstad		
1973	Harald Tiedemand		
1974	Jan Georg Iversen		
1975	Asbjørn Kristiansen		
1976	Hans Petter Ødegård		
1977	Dag Erik Pedersen		
1978	Geir Dahlen		
1979	Morten Dyrkorn		
1980	Odd Hallèn		
1981	Torjus Larsen		
1982	Atle Pedersen		
1983	Jon Bøe		
1984	Jan Erik Fjotland		
1985	Richard Rom Hansen		
1987	Knut Erik Nordengen		
1988	Roar Skaane		
1989	Bernt Andersen		
1990	Trond Bjerkely		
1991	Helge Hegerland		
1992	Thomas Nordahl		
1993	Dag Erik Ysland		
1994	Roy Sonsterud		
1995	Morten Hegreberg		
1996	Thor Hushovd		
1997	Stig Sverre Holmsen		
1998	Lars Breiseth		
1999	Per Martin Lund		
2000	Andreas Molandsveen		
2001	Christopher Myhre		
2002	Leonard Snoeks		
2003	Haakon Lilland	Stian Sommerseth	Frederik Wilmann
2004	Edvald Boasson Hagen	Haakon Lilland	Christoffer Berggren
2005	Edvald Boasson Hagen	Sten Stenersen	Anders Lund
2006	Sten Stenersen	Stian Aarud	
2007	Daniel Gomnes		
2008	Daniel Gomnes		
2009	Alexander Hervåg	Anders Tombre Pettersen	Jaran Nilsen
2010	Daniel Hoelgaard	Kristoffer Skjerping	Sven Erik Bystrøm
2011	Oscar Landa	Daniel Hoelgaard	Kristoffer Skjerping
2012	Fridtjof Røinås		Markus Hoelgaard
2013	Marius Sylta		
2014	Martin Vangen	Erlend Blikra	Tobias Foss
2015	Tobias Foss	Iver Knotten	Torjus Sleen
2016	Joakim Kjemhus	Hakon Aalrust	Erik Ysland
2017	Idar Andersen	Andreas Leknessund	Søren Wærenskjold
2018	Tord Gudmestad	Erlend Litlere	Fredrik Gjesteland Finnesand
2019	Sakarias Koller Løland	Dennis Gråsvold	Embret Svestad-Bårdseng
2020	Per Strand Hagenes	Tim Edvard Pettersen	Daniel Vold
2021	Per Strand Hagenes	Ola Sylling	Even Thorvaldsen
2022	Tobias Nakken	Oliver Aukland	Jesper Stiansen

== Women ==
Norwegian National Road Race Championships – Women's elite race
Race details
- Region: Norway
- Discipline: Road bicycle racing
- Type: One-day

History
- First edition: 1974
- First winner: May Britt Nilsen
- Most wins: Anita Valen de Vries (6 wins)
- Most recent: Sigrid Ytterhus Haugset

Year	Gold	Silver	Bronze
1974	May Britt Nilsen		
1975	May Britt Nilsen (2)		
1976	May Britt Nilsen (3)		
1977	May Britt Nilsen (4)		
1978	May Britt Nilsen (5)		
1979	Anita Andreassen		
1980	Nina Søby		
1981	Lisbeth Korsmo		
1982	Nina Johnsen		
1983	Nina Søby (2)		
1984	Unni Larsen		
1985	Anita Valen		
1986	Tone Benjaminsen		
1987	Unni Larsen (2)		
1988	Unni Larsen (3)		
1989	Unni Larsen (4)		
1990	Tone Fossum		
1991	Ragnhild Kostøl		
1992	Monica Valen		
1993	Monica Valen (2)		
1994	Monica Valen (3)		
1995	Jorunn Kvalø		
1996	Ingunn Bollerud	Ragnhild Kostøl	
1997	Monica Valen (4)	Jorunn Kvalø	Wenche Stensvold
1998	Monica Valen (5)	Aud Kari Berg	Ragnhild Kostøl
1999	Ragnhild Kostøl (2)	Solrun Flatås	Cecilie Christiansen
2000	Aud Kari Berg	Ingunn Bollerud	Monica Valen
2001	Aud Kari Berg (2)	Cecilie Christiansen	Linn Torp
2002	Anita Valen (2)	Jorunn Kvalø	Wenche Stensvold
2003	Anita Valen (3)	Linn Torp	Lene Byberg
2004	Anita Valen (4)	Linn Torp	Lene Byberg
2005	Anita Valen (5)	Linn Torp	Hege Line Eie
2006	Linn Torp	Elin Fylkesnes	Gunn Hilleren
2007	Kristine Saastad	Anita Valen de Vries	Solrun Flatås
2008	Anita Valen de Vries (6)	Linn Torp	Hege Line Eie
2009	Linn Torp (2)	Elin Steinsbø Fylkesnes	Marie Voreland
2010	Lise Nøstvold	Lene Byberg	Line Margareta Foss
2011	Frøydis Meen Wærsted	Emilie Moberg	Stine Borgli
2012	Hildegunn Gjertrud Hovdenak	Miriam Bjørnsrud	Lise Nøstvold
2013	Cecilie Gotaas Johnsen	Miriam Bjørnsrud	Emilie Moberg
2014	Camilla Indset Sørgjerd	Cecilie Gotaas Johnsen	Ingrid Lorvik
2015	Miriam Bjørnsrud	Cecilie Gotaas Johnsen	Ingrid Lorvik
2016	Vita Heine	Miriam Bjørnsrud	Katrine Aalerud
2017	Vita Heine (2)	Katrine Aalerud	Ingrid Lorvik
2018	Vita Heine (3)	Susanne Andersen	Stine Borgli
2019	Ingrid Lorvik	Susanne Andersen	Ingvild Gåskjenn
2020	Mie Bjørndal Ottestad	Vibeke Lystad	Emilie Moberg
2021	Vita Heine (4)	Emilie Moberg	Ingvild Gåskjenn
2022	Malin Eriksen	Vibeke Lystad	Mari Hole Mohr
2023	Susanne Andersen	Katrine Aalerud	Mie Bjørndal Ottestad
2024	Mie Bjørndal Ottestad (2)	Emma Dyrhovden	Katrine Aalerud
2025	Mie Bjørndal Ottestad (3)	Katrine Aalerud	Kamilla Aasebø
2026	Sigrid Ytterhus Haugset	Katrine Aalerud	Marte Berg Edseth

== Criterium Championships ==
Norwegian National Criterium Championships
Race details
- Region: Norway
- Discipline: Road bicycle racing
- Type: One-day

Year	Men's winner	Women's winner
1996	Svein Gaute Hølestøl	Ingunn Bollerud
1997	Kurt Asle Arvesen	Monica Valen
1998	Stig Kristiansen	Ragnhild Kostøl
1999	Rune Jogert	Jorunn Kvalø
2000	Svein Gaute Hølestøl	Monica Valen
2001	Rune Jogert	Jorunn Kvalø
2002	Lars Breiseth	Anita Valen
2003	Martin Vestby	Anita Valen
2004	Jostein Hole	Lene Byberg
2005	Jon Øystein Bergseth	Helene Tveter
2006	Roy Hegreberg	Linn Torp
2007	Joachim Bøhler	Elin Steinsbø Fylkesnes
2008	Alexander Kristoff	Bjørg Eva Jensen
2009	Alexander Kristoff	Marie Voreland
2010	Roy Hegreberg	Tone Hatteland
2011	Sven Erik Bystrøm	Emilie Moberg
2012	Kristoffer Skjerping	Emilie Moberg
2013	Sven Erik Bystrøm	Thea Thorsen
2014	Håvard Blikra	Miriam Bjørnsrud
2015	Herman Dahl	Thea Thorsen
2016	Kristoffer Halvorsen	Miriam Bjørnsrud
2017	Kristoffer Halvorsen	Susanne Andersen
2018	Erlend Blikra	Susanne Andersen
2019	Jonas Iversby Hvideberg	Ingvild Gåskjenn
2020	Erlend Blikra	Caroline Thorvik Olsen
2021	Tord Gudmestad	Nora Tveit
2022	Martin Urianstad	Pernille Feldmann

== See also ==
- Norwegian National Time Trial Championships
- National road cycling championships
