= Stian Remme =

Norwegian cyclist

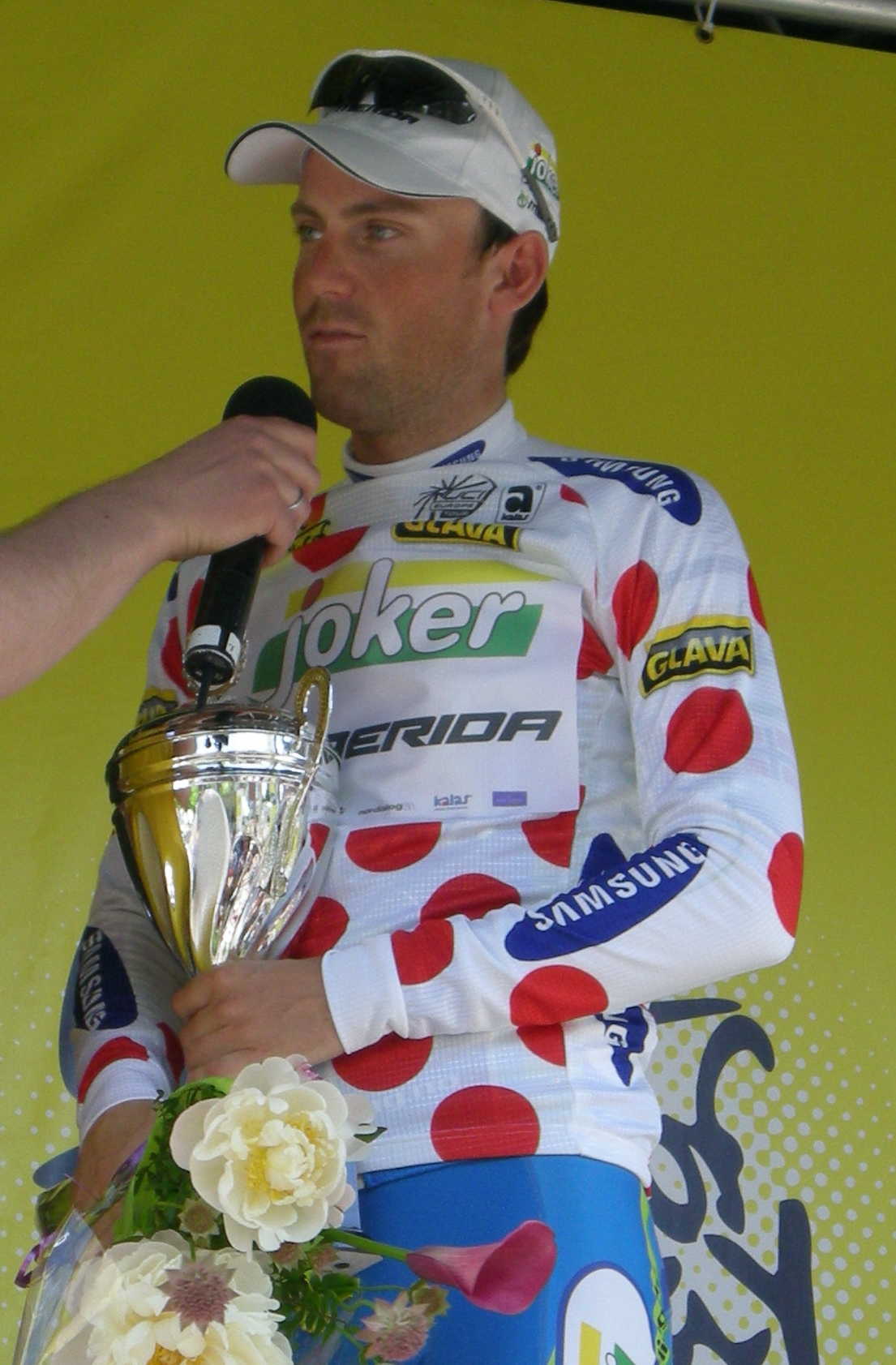

Personal information
- Full name: Stian Remme
- Born: 4 June 1982 (age 44) Bergen, Norway

Cycling career
- Sport: Cycling
- Current team: Retired
- Discipline: Road
- Role: Rider

Professional teams
- 2004–2008: Team Sparebanken Vest
- 2009–2013: Joker–Bianchi
- 2014: Team FixIT.no

Stian Remme (born 4 June 1982) is a Norwegian former professional racing cyclist.

== Major results ==
2005
1st Team time trial, National Road Championships (with Are Andresen Hunsager and Morten Christiansen)
2006
1st Team time trial, National Road Championships (with Morten Hegreberg and Kjetil Ingvaldsen)
1st Stage 2 Fana Sykkelfestival
2007
1st Overall Grenland GP

1st Stage 3

2nd Ronde de l'Oise
2008
2nd Road race, National Road Championships
3rd Overall Tour des Pyrénées

1st Stage 2

2009
1st Overall Fana Sykkelfestival

1st Stages 1 & 2

1st Stage 5 Ringerike GP
2011
2nd Tour Alsace
2nd Mi-août en Bretagne
2013
3rd Hadeland GP
