= Filip Eidsheim =

Norwegian bicycle racer

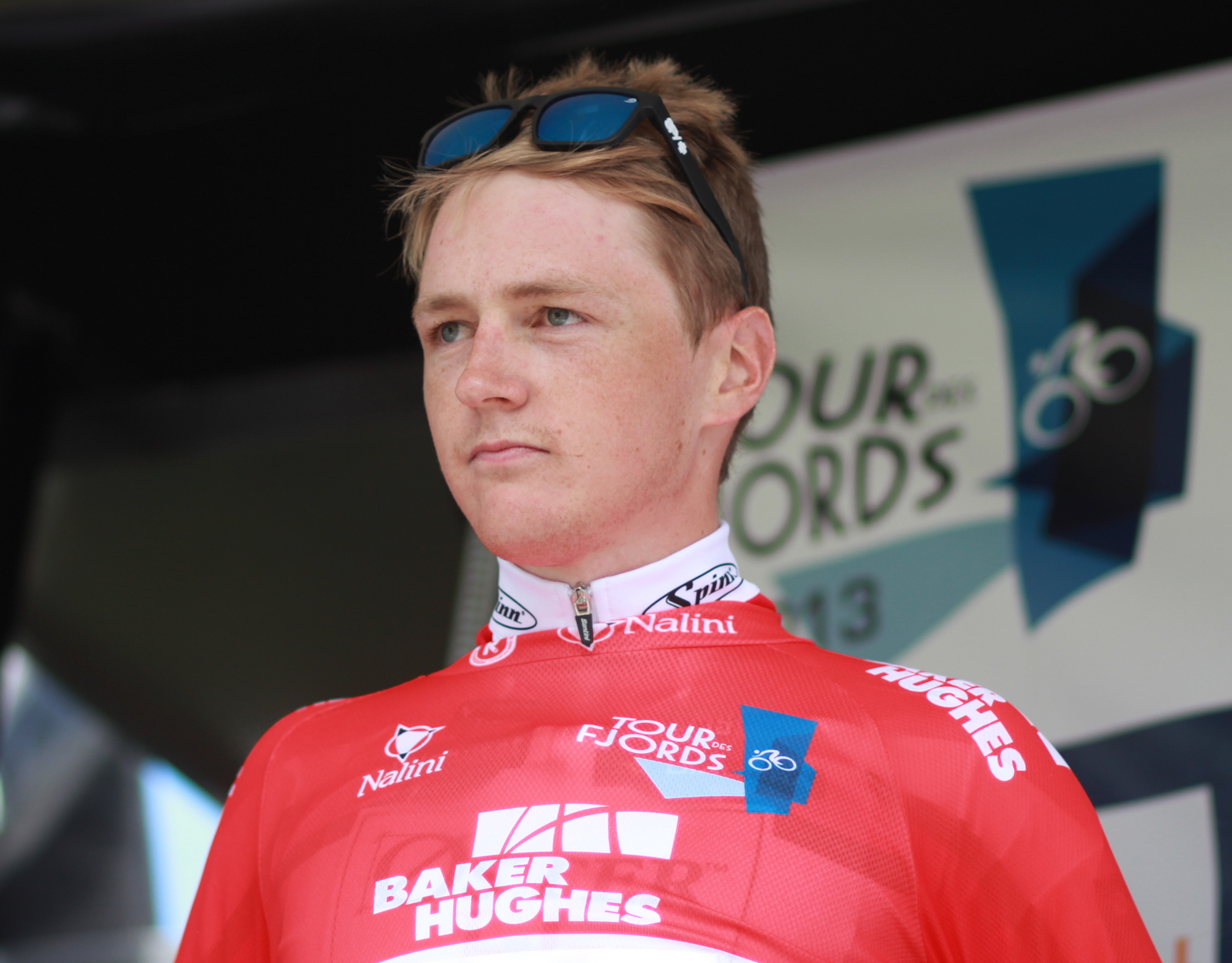
- Eidsheim at the 2013 Tour des Fjords

Personal information
- Full name: Filip Eidsheim
- Born: 16 February 1990 (age 36)

Cycling career
- Sport: Cycling
- Current team: Retired
- Discipline: Road
- Role: Rider

Professional teams
- 2010–2013: Sparebanken Vest–Ridley
- 2014–2015: Team FixIT.no

Filip Eidsheim (born 16 February 1990) is a Norwegian former professional cyclist.

== Major results ==
2008
2nd Time trial, National Junior Road Championships
2010
1st Stage 4 Tour des Pyrénées
2011
3rd Dwars door de Antwerpse Kempen
2012
4th ZLM Tour
10th Ronde van Vlaanderen U23
2013
8th Skive–Løbet
2014
2nd Road race, National Road Championships
3rd Central European Tour Szerencs–Ibrány
5th Central European Tour Košice–Miskolc
10th Trofej Umag
2015
Tour du Maroc

1st Stages 9 & 10

6th GP Viborg
