= Håvard Blikra =

Norwegian cyclist

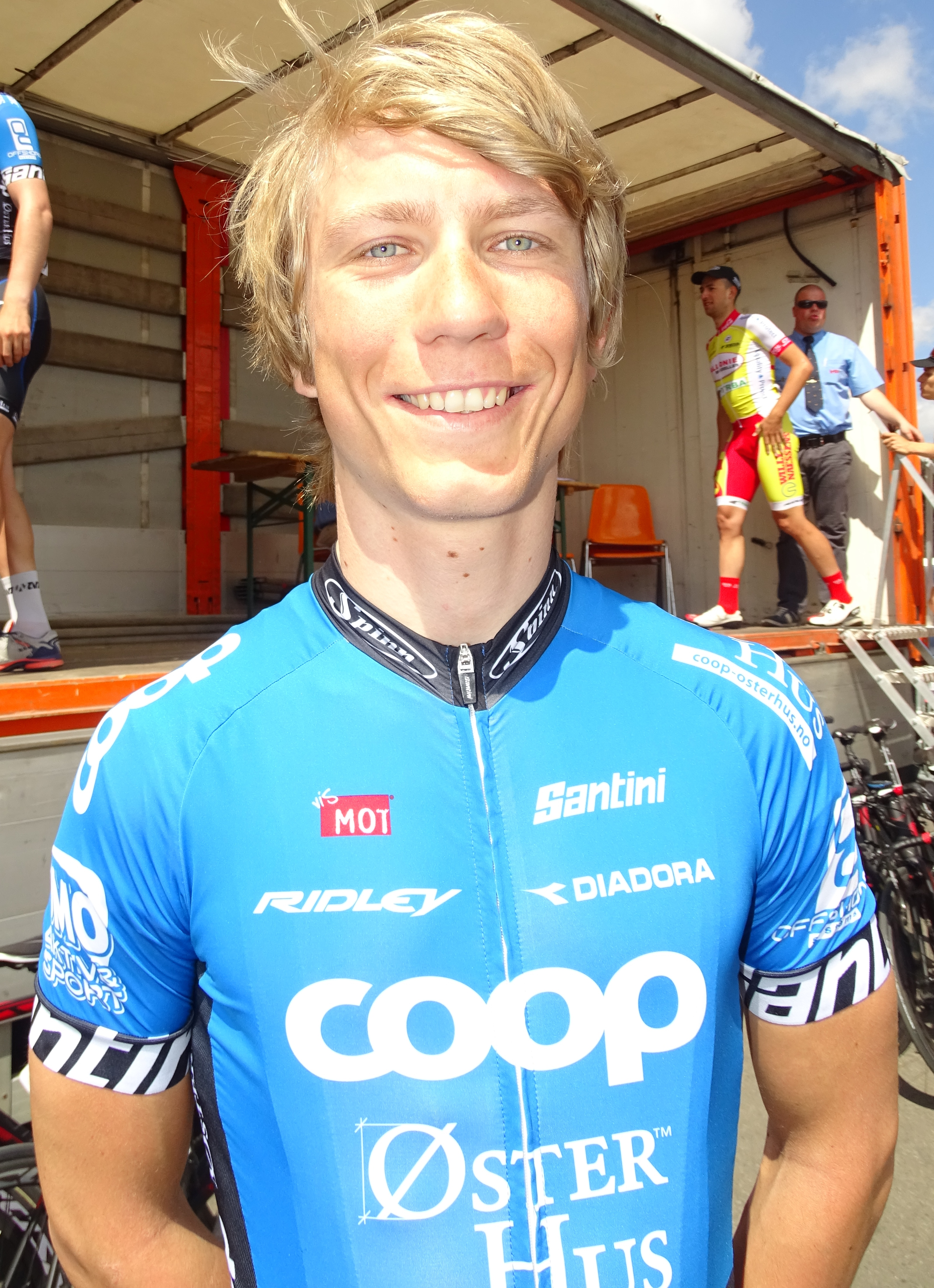
- Blikra in 2015

Personal information
- Full name: Håvard Jorbekk Blikra
- Born: November 2, 1991 (age 34) Norway

Cycling career
- Sport: Cycling
- Current team: Retired
- Discipline: Road
- Role: Rider

Amateur teams
- 2009–2010: Stavanger SK
- 2010: Sparebanken Vest–Ridley (stagiaire)

Professional team
- 2011–2017: Sparebanken Vest–Ridley

Håvard Jorbekk Blikra (born November 2, 1991) is a Norwegian former road cyclist.

== Major results ==
2012
5th Poreč Trophy
9th Rogaland GP
2014
3rd Grand Prix Paul Borremans
5th Destination Thy
7th Hadeland GP
2015
1st Overall Boucle de l'Artois

1st Stages 1, 2 & 3

2nd Skive–Løbet
3rd Ster van Zwolle
6th Himmerland Rundt
8th Gooikse Pijl
2016
4th Arno Wallaard Memorial
5th GP Viborg
6th Himmerland Rundt
7th Grand Prix de la Ville de Lillers
