= Ringerike GP =

Norwegian one-day road cycling race

Ringerike Grand Prix
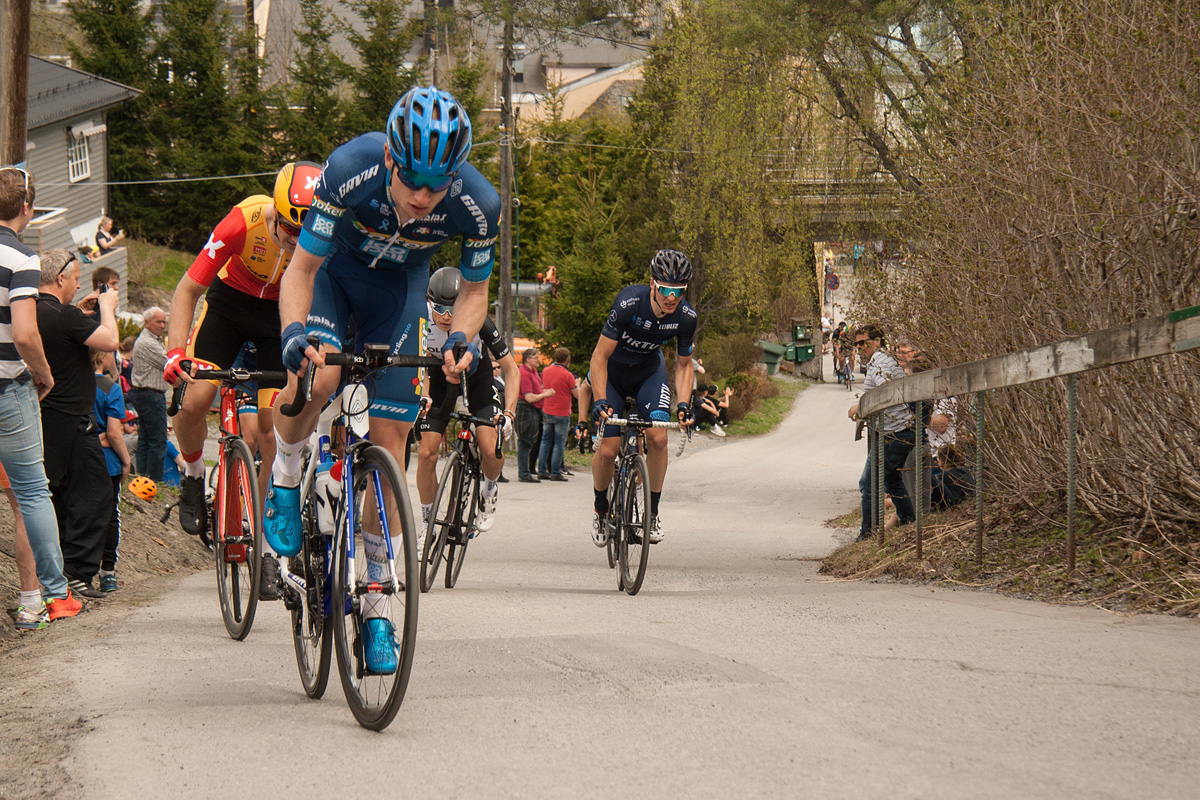
- The race in 2018

Race details
- Date: Early May
- Region: Ringerike, Norway
- Discipline: Road
- Type: Stage race (until 2010); One-day race (since 2011)
- Organiser: Ringerike Sykkelklubb
- Web site: www.rgp.no

History
- Editions: 49 (as of 2026)
- First winner: Tom Martin Biseth (NOR)
- Most wins: Dag Erik Pedersen (NOR); Dag Otto Lauritzen (NOR); (3 wins)
- Most recent: Kevin Sandli Messel (NOR)

Ringerike Grand Prix is a road bicycle race held annually near Hønefoss, in the region of Ringerike, Norway. The race was created in 1975 as the Fossen Grand Prix, and was ranked 2.2 on the UCI Europe Tour between 2005 and 2010. In 2011 it turned into a one-day race (not UCI race) while Tour of Norway, held in the whole eastern Norway, replaced it on the calendar. In 2013 the race came back on the UCI Europe Tour as a race ranked 1.2.

== Winners ==
Year	Country	Rider	Team
1975	Norway	Tom Martin Biseth	
1976	Norway	Jon Rangfred Hanssen	
1977	Norway	Stein Bråthen	
1978	Norway	Arne Klavenes	
1979	Norway	Dag Erik Pedersen	
1980	Norway	Stein Bråthen	
1981	Norway	Dag Erik Pedersen	
1982	Norway	Terje Gjengaar	
1983	Norway	Dag Otto Lauritzen	
1984	Norway	Torjus Larsen	
1985	Norway	Torjus Larsen	
1986	Norway	Atle Pedersen	
1987	Norway	Olaf Lurvik	
1988	No race		
1989	Norway	Jan Erik Fjotland	
1990	Norway	Dag Erik Pedersen	
1991	Norway	Dag Otto Lauritzen	
1992	Norway	Dag Otto Lauritzen	
1993	Norway	Ole Sigurd Simensen	
1994	Norway	Steffen Kjærgaard	
1995	Norway	Ole Sigurd Simensen	
1996	Norway	Svein Gaute Hølestøl	
1997	Norway	Bo André Namtvedt	
1998	Norway	Svein Gaute Hølestøl	
1999	Norway	Thor Hushovd	
2000	Poland	Arkadiusz Wojtas	Mróz–Supradyn Witaminy
2001	Germany	Enrico Poitschke	Wiesenhof–Leipzig
2002	Norway	Mads Kaggestad	Team Krone
2003	Sweden	Jonas Holmkvist	Team Bianchi Scandinavia
2004	Finland	Kimmo Kananen	Team Bianchi Nordic
2005	Norway	Are Andresen	Team Sparebanken Vest
2006	Norway	Gabriel Rasch	Maxbo–Bianchi
2007	Norway	Edvald Boasson Hagen	Maxbo–Bianchi
2008	Sweden	Fredrik Ericsson	Cykelcity.se
2009	Russia	Sergey Firsanov	Team Designa Køkken
2010	Norway	Christer Rake	Joker–Bianchi
2011	Norway	Gabriel Rasch	Garmin–Cervélo
2012	Denmark	Michael Rasmussen	Christina Watches–Onfone
2013	Norway	Reidar Borgersen	Joker–Merida
2014	Denmark	Magnus Cort	Cult Energy–Vital Water
2015	Denmark	Asbjørn Kragh Andersen	Team TreFor–Blue Water
2016	Norway	Trond Trondsen	Team Sparebanken Sør
2017	Denmark	Rasmus Guldhammer	Team VéloCONCEPT
2018	Norway	Syver Wærsted	Uno-X Norwegian Development Team
2019	Norway	Kristoffer Skjerping	Uno-X Norwegian Development Team
2020– 2021	No race due to the COVID-19 pandemic in Norway		
2022	Norway	Sakarias Løland	Uno-X Dare Development Team
2023	Great Britain	Jack Rootkin-Gray	Saint Piran
2024	Norway	Idar Andersen	Uno-X Mobility Development Team
2025	Norway	Sakarias Koller Løland	Uno-X Mobility
2026	Norway	Kevin Sandli Messel	Team Ringerike
