= Gustav Höög =

Swedish cyclist

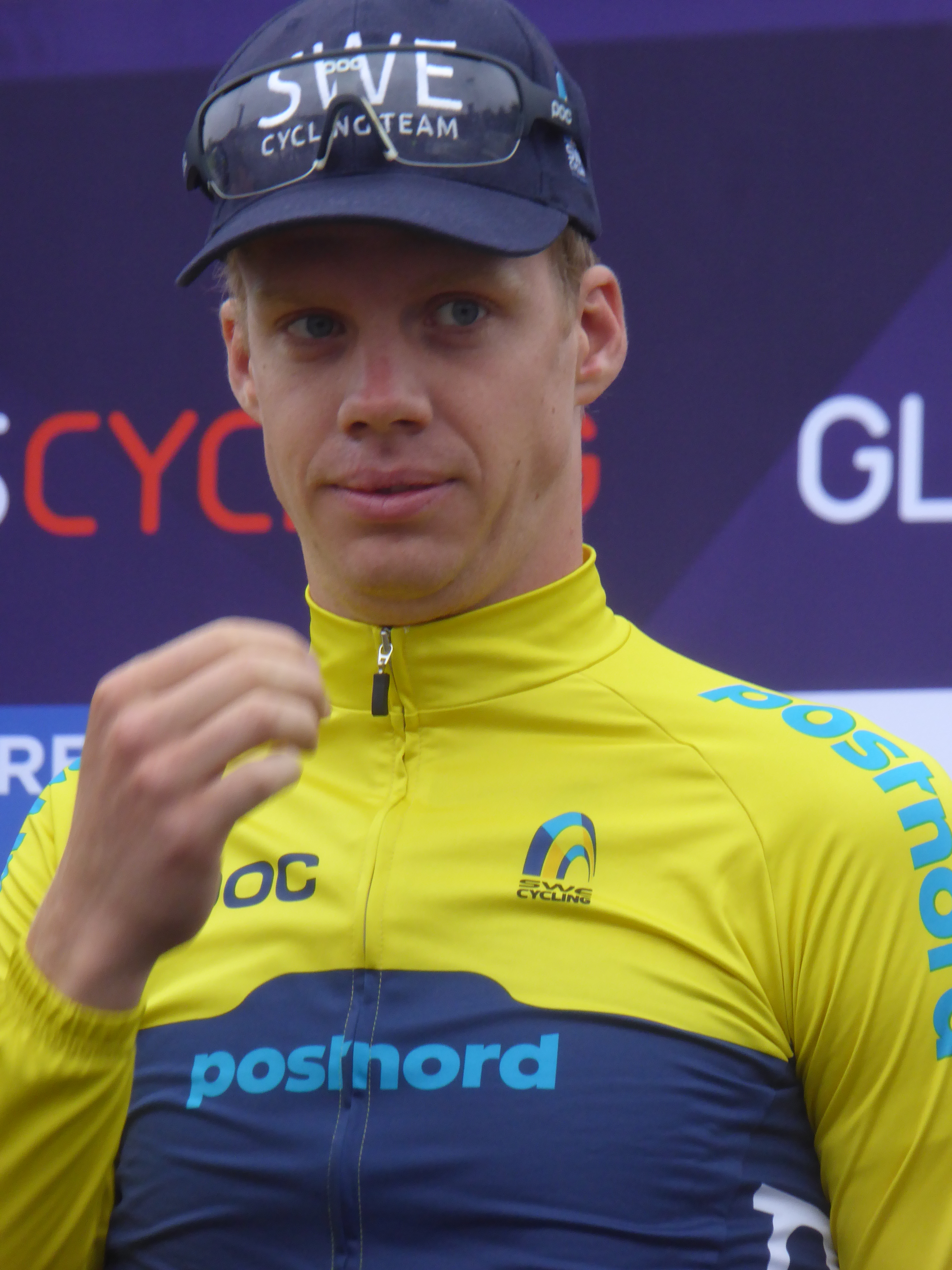
- Höög at the 2018 European Road Cycling Championships

Personal information
- Full name: Gustav Höög
- Born: 11 April 1995 (age 31)

Cycling career
- Sport: Cycling
- Current team: Retired
- Discipline: Road
- Role: Rider

Amateur team
- 2014: CK Bure

Professional teams
- 2015–2016: Team Tre Berg–Bianchi
- 2017–2018: Team Coop

Gustav Höög (born 11 April 1995) is a Swedish former road cyclist, who competed professionally between 2015 and 2018 for Team Tre Berg–Bianchi and Team Coop.

== Major results ==
2013
1st Road race, National Junior Road Championships
9th Paris–Roubaix Juniors
2014
5th Road race, National Road Championships
7th Skive–Løbet
2015
2nd Road race, National Under-23 Road Championships
3rd Overall Tour of Estonia
3rd Overall Baltic Chain Tour

1st Young rider classification

5th GP Viborg
2018
1st Memorial Van Coningsloo
1st Kalmar Grand Prix
3rd Road race, National Road Championships
9th Heistse Pijl
