= Vårvik =

Vårvik is a Norwegian surname. Notable people with the surname include:

- Atle Vårvik (born 1965), Norwegian speed skater and entrepreneur
- Dagfinn Vårvik (1924–2018), Norwegian politician
- Kåre Vårvik, Norwegian cyclist
