= Team Coop–Repsol =

Team Coop–Repsol can refer to:

- Team Coop–Repsol (men's team)
- Team Coop–Repsol (women's team)
