= Roy Hegreberg =

Norwegian cyclist

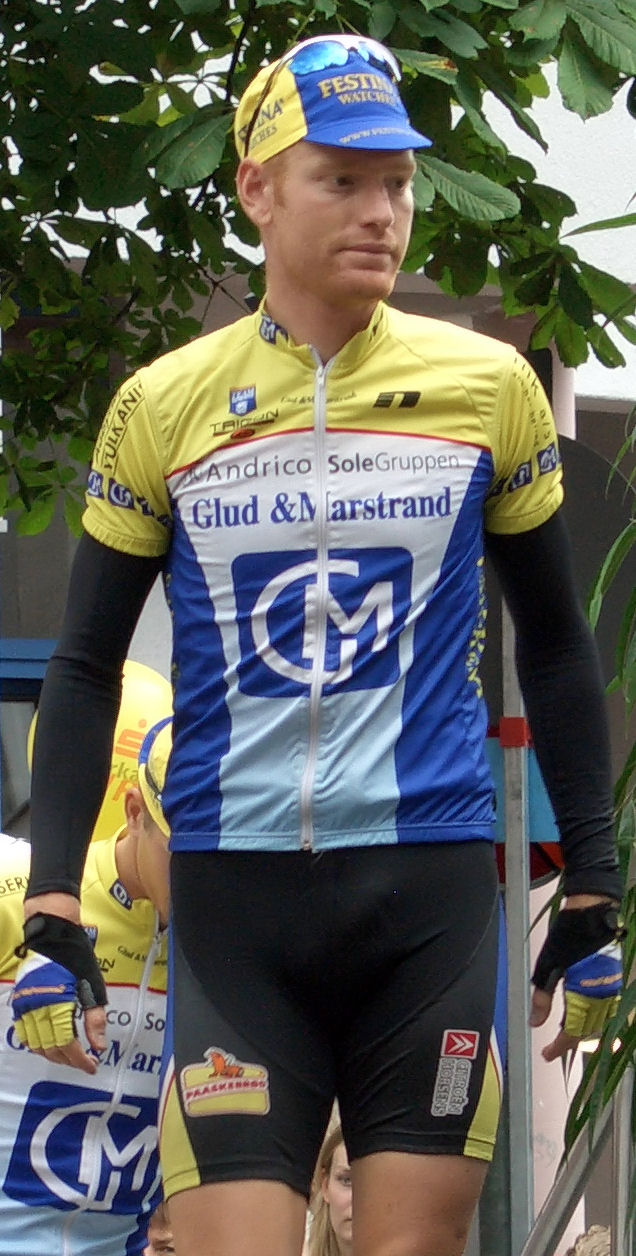

Personal information
- Full name: Roy Hegreberg
- Born: 25 March 1981 (age 45) Norway

Cycling career
- Sport: Cycling
- Current team: Retired
- Discipline: Road
- Role: Rider; Manager

Professional teams
- 2004: Jartazi Granville Team
- 2005–2006: Glud & Marstrand–Horsens
- 2007: Team Sparebanken Vest
- 2008: Team GLS–Pakke Shop
- 2009–2011: Sparebanken Vest–Ridley

Managerial teams
- 2012–2018: Team Øster Hus–Ridley
- 2023–: Team Coop–Repsol

Roy Hegreberg (born 25 March 1981 in Norway) is a Norwegian former professional road bicycle racer, who competed as a professional between 2004 and 2011. He is the younger brother of Morten Hegreberg.

After his career he became the race director of the Norwegian stage race Tour des Fjords.

== Major results ==
2003
3rd Road race, National Under-23 Road Championships
2004
7th Omloop van het Houtland
9th Challenge de Hesbaye
10th Vlaamse Havenpijl
2005
4th Overall Ringerike GP

1st Stage 5

2006
3rd Road race, National Road Championships
2007
8th Grand Prix de Beuvry-la-Forêt
2008
8th Overall Tour du Loir-et-Cher
8th Overall Boucle de l'Artois
9th Druivenkoers Overijse
2009
5th Road race, National Road Championships
7th Ronde van Noord-Holland
8th Arno Wallaard Memorial
9th Memorial Rik Van Steenbergen
9th Antwerpse Havenpijl
2010
1st Stage 1 Tour des Pyrénées
3rd Road race, National Road Championships
5th Ronde van Noord-Holland
7th Rogaland GP
10th Schaal Sels
10th Kernen Omloop Echt-Susteren
2011
4th Porec Trophy
5th Zellik–Galmaarden
6th GP Impanis-Van Petegem
7th Rogaland GP
7th Dutch Food Valley Classic
8th Druivenkoers Overijse
8th Scandinavian Race in Uppsala
