= Benjaminsen =

Benjaminsen is a Nordic surname. Notable people with the surname include:

- Andrine Benjaminsen (born 1995), Norwegian orienteer and ski orienteer
- Anne Benjaminsen (born 1964), Finnish ski-orienteering competitor
- Aron Benjaminsen (born 2007), Faroese footballer
- Fróði Benjaminsen (born 1977), Faroese footballer
- Tone Benjaminsen, Norwegian racing cyclist
- Vidar Benjaminsen (born 1962), Norwegian ski-orienteering competitor
