= Morten Hegreberg =

Norwegian cyclist

Personal information
- Full name: Morten Hegreberg
- Born: June 11, 1977 (age 49) Stavanger, Norway

Cycling career
- Sport: Cycling
- Current team: Retired
- Discipline: Road
- Role: Rider

Professional teams
- 2000–2001: Ville de Charleroi–New Systems
- 2004: Jartazi Granville Team
- 2005–2008: Team Sparebanken Vest

Morten Hegreberg (born 11 June 1977) is a Norwegian former professional cyclist. He competed in the men's individual road race at the 2004 Summer Olympics. He is the older brother of Roy Hegreberg.

== Major results ==
1995
1st Road race, National Junior Road Championships
2000
1st Stage 2 Ringerike GP
2002
7th Classic Loire Atlantique
2003
2nd Road race, National Road Championships
2004
3rd Road race, National Road Championships
2005
1st Stage 7 An Post Rás
3rd Road race, National Road Championships
2006
1st Team time trial, National Road Championships
1st Stage 9 An Post Rás
2007
5th Flèche du Sud
2008
7th Rogaland Grand Prix
