= Håvard Nybø =

Norwegian cyclist

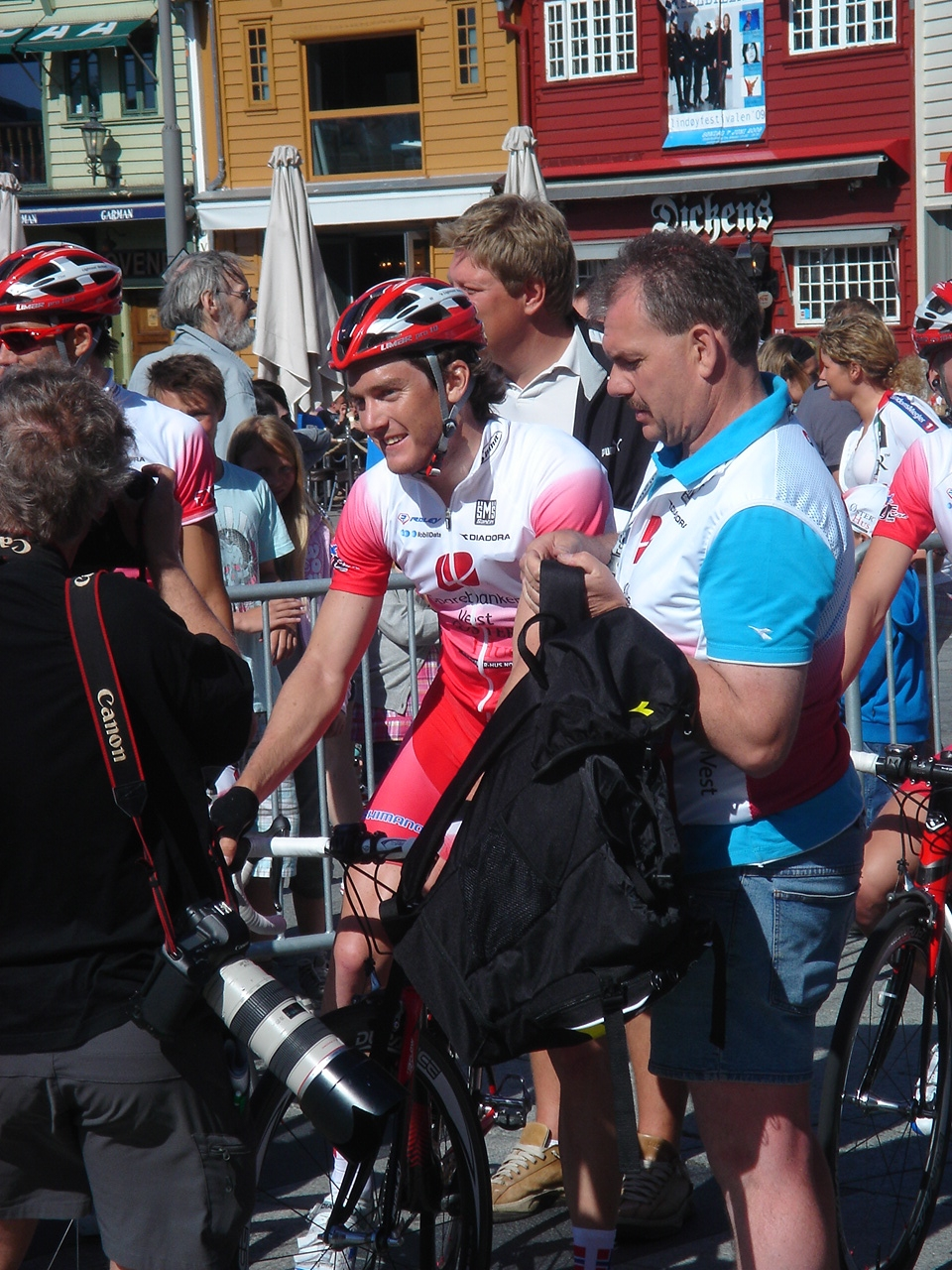
- Nybø in 2009

Personal information
- Full name: Håvard Nybø
- Born: 11 April 1983 (age 43) Norway

Cycling career
- Sport: Cycling
- Current team: Retired
- Discipline: Road
- Role: Rider

Professional teams
- 2005–2006: Glud & Marstrand–Horsens
- 2007–2009: Team Sparebanken Vest

Håvard Nybø (born 11 April 1983) is a Norwegian former professional racing cyclist.

== Major results ==
2004
1st Road race, National Under-23 Road Championships
2006
1st Stage 2 Ringerike GP
2009
1st Rogaland Grand Prix
