= Trond Trondsen =

Norwegian cyclist

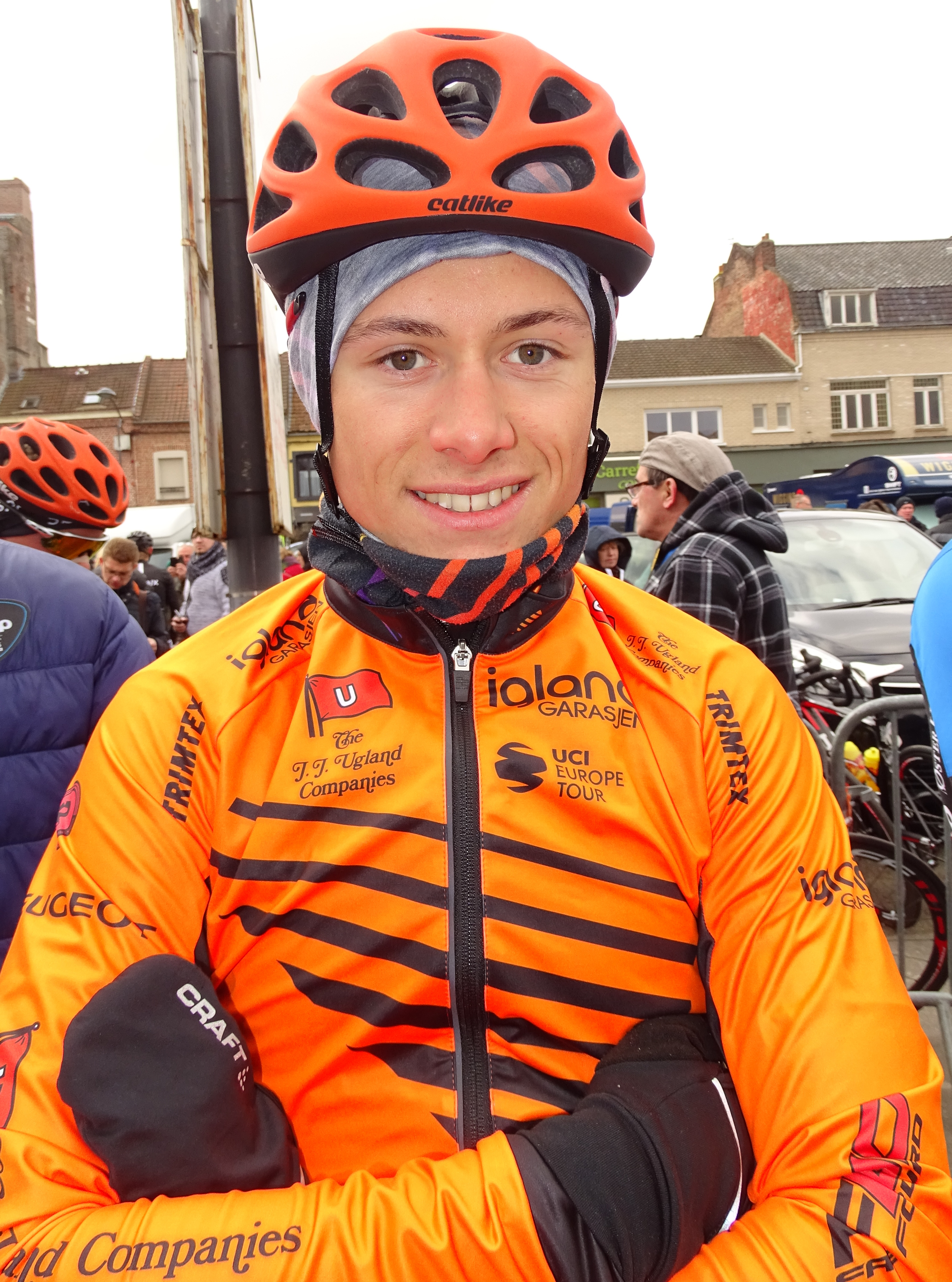
- Trondsen in 2016.

Personal information
- Full name: Trond Håkon Trondsen
- Born: 4 August 1994 (age 32) Trondheim, Norway

Cycling career
- Sport: Cycling
- Discipline: Road
- Role: Rider

Amateur team
- 2019: Wanty–Gobert (stagiaire)

Professional teams
- 2013–2014: Team Frøy–Bianchi
- 2015–2017: Team Sparebanken Sør
- 2018–2020: Team Coop

Trond Håkon Trondsen (born 4 August 1994) is a Norwegian cyclist, who most recently rode for UCI Continental team Team Coop.

== Major results ==
2016
1st Ringerike GP
8th Overall Tour du Loir-et-Cher
2017
4th Overall East Bohemia Tour
5th Overall Baltic Chain Tour
5th Road race, National Road Championships
2018
1st Scandinavian Race Uppsala
8th Overall Tour de Normandie
2019
1st Sundvolden GP
3rd Overall Tour de Normandie

1st Stage 6

2020
1st Gylne Gutuer
