= Tuija =

Tuija is a feminine Finnish given name. Notable people with the name include:

- Tuija Brax (born 1965), Finnish politician
- Tuija Hakkila (born 1959), Finnish classical pianist
- Tuija Helander (born 1961), Finnish hurdler
- Tuija Hyyrynen (born 1988), Finnish footballer
- Tuija Kinnunen (born 1965), Finnish cyclist
- Tuija Lehtinen (born 1954), Finnish writer
- Tuija Lindström (1950–2017), Finnish-Swedish photographer and artist
- Tuija Toivonen (born 1958), Finnish long-distance runner
