= Unni Larsen =

Norwegian cyclist and dogsled racer

Personal information
- Born: 23 March 1959 (age 67) Oslo, Norway

Cycling career
- Sport: Cycling

Unni Larsen (born 23 March 1959) is a Norwegian former racing cyclist and dogsled racer who competed in two Olympic Games (1984, 1988). Between 1977 and 1992, she won fifteen titles at the Norwegian cycling championships.

== Personal life ==
Larsen has three brothers. She studied carpentry at a vocational school and apprenticed to become a carpenter. She has a daughter, Trine, born in June 1985.

== Career ==
Larsen began skiing as a child, and in 1983, she placed 15th in the national championships in 10 km cross-country skiing. She was also the national champion in relay dogsled racing in 1984. Larsen felt that dogsled racing had better gender equality than cycling, saying that races for men and women were held at the same time at the same courses, which was usually not the case in cycling, and that the environment was less sexist, although she did see increasing respect for women cyclists during her career.

When she was 17 in 1976, she bought her first bicycle, which she intended to use for transit to and from school, but her neighbor convinced her to buy an expensive bike for racing. She entered her first race a few days later and won. This qualified her for her first national championships, and despite her lack of experience, she placed 4th.

The next year, she beat May Britt Nilsen to win her first national title in the time trial and was sent to the Nordic championships as part of the first Norwegian women's team. Larsen later commented that the women's accommodations at the event were inferior to those of the men. In 1978, she competed at her first UCI Road World Championships in Nürburg, where the Norwegian women's team was forced out of their hotel room after one night to accommodate the men's team.

She cut back on her training efforts for several years, feeling that there was too much pressure on her to succeed, but after the 1981 season, Larsen began to intensify her training again.

Larsen has fifteen victories in various Norwegian cycling championships and is also a Nordic champion in road racing. She participated in the 1984 Summer Olympics in Los Angeles, where she placed fourth. She originally planned to retire after the Olympics, but as her season went well, she decided to continue competing. Later in the year, she discovered she was pregnant. She applied for funding to train for the upcoming 1988 Summer Olympics in Seoul, and though she was uncertain whether she would receive the funding due to her pregnancy, it was granted to her. She continued training during her pregnancy until advised to stop by her doctor.

Larsen competed at the 1988 Olympics, where she finished 20th.
