= Arild Andersen (cyclist) =

Norwegian cyclist

Personal information
- Born: 19 February 1928
- Died: 11 January 1997 (aged 68)

Cycling career
- Sport: Cycling
- Role: Rider

Arild Andersen (19 February 1928 – 11 January 1997) was a Norwegian professional racing cyclist. He won the Norwegian National Road Race Championship in 1950.
