= Anita Andreassen =

Norwegian musher and cyclist

Medal record

Representing Norway

Women's mushing

World Championships
Gold medal – first place	1992	Pulk
Gold medal – first place	1993	Pulk
Gold medal – first place	1994	Pulk
Bronze medal – third place	1991	Pulk

Anita Andreassen (born 9 October 1960) is a Norwegian mushing competitor and cyclist. She is a three time world champion in mushing. She was awarded Egebergs Ærespris in 1996, for excelling in multiple sports.

== Mushing ==
She received a bronze medal at the 1991 World Championship, followed by gold medals in 1992, 1993 and 1994. At the 1993 World Championships, she also raced faster than the men. She is three times European champion (2 individual, 1 relay), and several times national champion in mushing.

In 1987 she also became the first to win all three events during the Norwegian mushing championships. The achievement earned her the King's Cup. She also won the King's Cup trophy in mushing in 1989. She retired after her 1994 title.

== Other sports ==
Andreassen was national champion in road cycling in 1979. In a tight race in Steinkjer, during which it hailed, she won only centimetres ahead of reigning five-time national champion May Britt Nilsen. Andreassen was a member of the national team from 1977 to 1980, and represented Norway at the 1979 UCI Road World Championships.

She has also competed successfully in cross country skiing.

== Awards ==
Andreassen was awarded Egebergs Ærespris in 1996, for her accomplishments in mushing, cycling and skiing. She received the badge of honor from Troms District Association of the Sports Confederation in 1982, and the badge with star in 2004, for her later achievements.

== Personal life ==
She was born in Tromsø and resided in Tromsdalen. Having finished commerce school in 1978, she worked as a bank clerk in the 1980s. She later resided in Skellefteå, having had two children in 1995 and 1997.

Awards
Preceded by Ingrid Kristiansen	Egebergs Ærespris; 1996	Succeeded by Anette Bøe
