= Karl Helland =

Norwegian cyclist

Personal information
- Born: 17 March 1943 (age 83) Copenhagen, Denmark

Cycling career
- Sport: Cycling
- Role: Rider

Karl Helland (born 17 March 1943) is a Norwegian former professional racing cyclist. He won the Norwegian National Road Race Championship in 1966.
