= Nina Søby =

Norwegian cyclist

Personal information
- Born: 4 August 1956 (age 70) Hamar, Norway

Cycling career
- Sport: Cycling
- Role: Rider

Nina Søby (born 4 August 1956) is a Norwegian former professional racing cyclist. She won the Norwegian National Road Race Championship in 1980 and 1983. She also competed at the 1984 Summer Olympics in Los Angeles, where she placed 18th in the individual road race.
