= Gabriel Rasch =

Norwegian cyclist

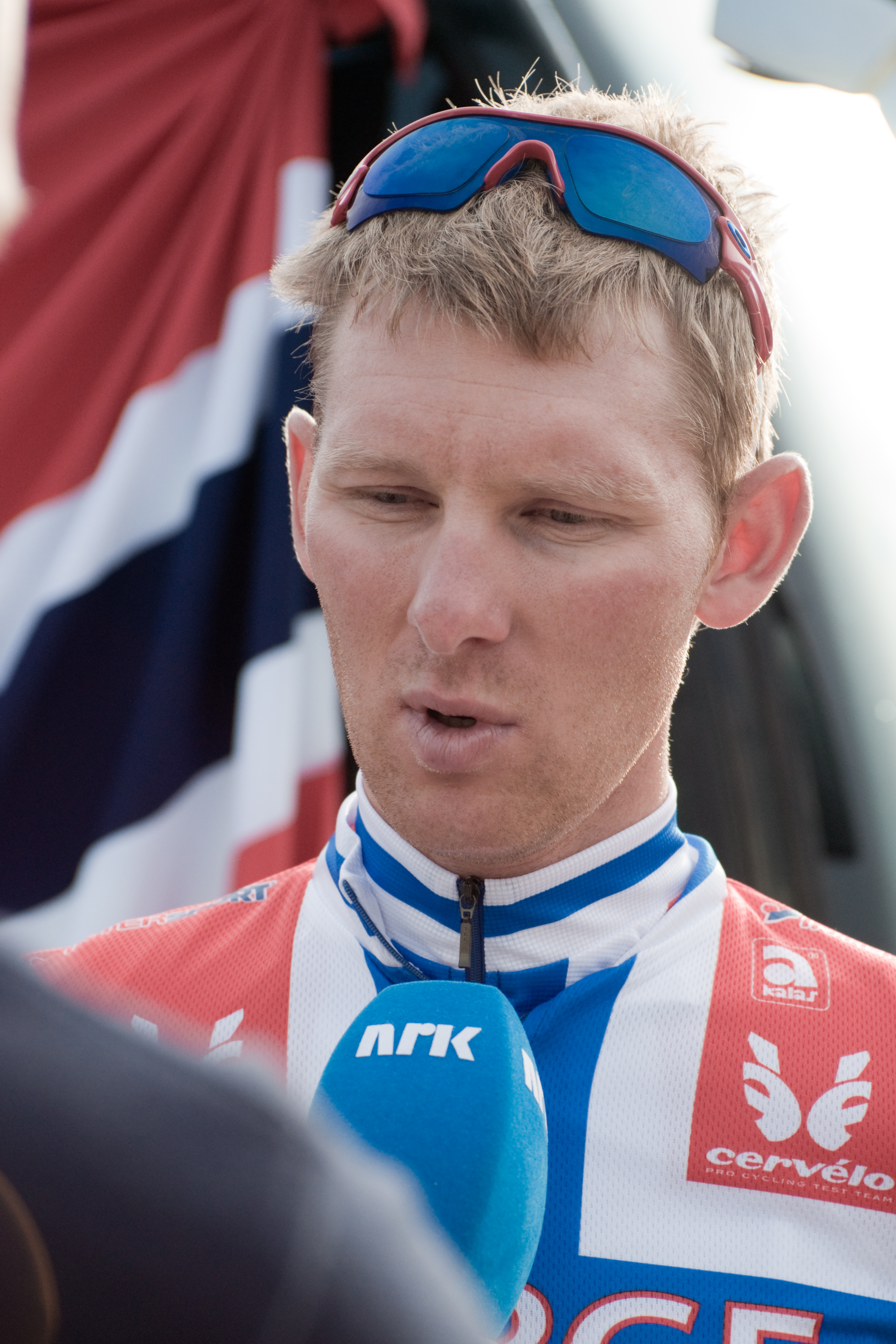
- Rasch at the 2009 UCI Road World Championships.

Personal information
- Full name: Ole Gabriel Rasch
- Nickname: Gabba
- Born: 8 April 1976 (age 50) Hole, Norway
- Height: 1.84 m (6 ft 0 in)
- Weight: 73 kg (161 lb)

Cycling career
- Sport: Cycling
- Current team: Uno-X Mobility
- Discipline: Road
- Role: Rider (retired); Directeur sportif
- Rider type: Classics specialist

Amateur teams
- 2002: Team Krone
- 2003: Ringerike
- 2003: Team Fakta (stagiaire)
- 2005: Team Sparebanken Vest
- 2006–2007: Maxbo–Bianchi

Professional teams
- 2008: Crédit Agricole
- 2009–2010: Cervélo TestTeam
- 2011: Garmin–Cervélo
- 2012: FDJ–BigMat
- 2013–2014: Team Sky

Managerial teams
- 2014–2022: Team Sky
- 2023–: Uno-X Pro Cycling Team

Ole Gabriel Rasch (born 8 April 1976) is a Norwegian former road bicycle racer, who currently works as a directeur sportif for UCI WorldTeam Uno-X Mobility.

== Career ==
Rasch was born in Hole, Norway. For his first three professional contracts, Rasch was a teammate of countryman Thor Hushovd, and he has credited Hushovd with helping him break into the professional ranks. He won the Norwegian National Road Race Championship in 2003.

Rasch left FDJ–BigMat at the end of the 2012 season, and was scheduled to join the new IAM Cycling team for the 2013 season. However, it was later announced that Rasch was joining Team Sky instead. It was announced in October 2013, that Rasch would retire from cycling during the 2014 season, to become a directeur sportif with Team Sky. Rasch completed his professional career with a 117th-place finish in Paris–Roubaix.

== Personal life ==
Rasch currently resides in Monaco.

== Major results ==
2000
7th Overall Tour de l'Ain
8th Overall Tour de Slovaquie
2001
2nd Road race, National Road Championships
9th Overall Ringerike GP
2002
2nd Overall Ringerike GP
2003
1st Road race, National Road Championships
6th Mi-Août 3
2004
3rd Overall Ringerike GP
2005
5th Overall Tour de Slovaquie
7th Overall Rás Tailteann
7th Overall Ringerike GP
2006
1st Overall Ringerike GP
1st GP Möbel Alvisse
2nd Overall Cinturón a Mallorca
2nd Druivenkoers
3rd Overall Tour de la Somme
4th Overall Rhône-Alpes Isère Tour
6th Grote Prijs Stad Zottegem
7th Colliers Classic
8th Overall Roserittet
9th GP Herning
2007
1st Overall Gjøvik GP
1st Overall Rhône-Alpes Isère Tour

1st Stage 3

3rd Overall Ringerike GP
4th Overall Paris–Corrèze
6th Sparkassen Giro Bochum
8th Overall Rheinland-Pfalz Rundfahrt
9th Overall Circuit des Ardennes
2008
5th Tro-Bro Léon
6th Overall Circuit Franco-Belge
2011
1st Overall Ringerike GP
7th Overall Tour of Qatar
10th Overall Tour de Picardie

=== Grand Tour general classification results timeline ===
Grand Tour	2008	2009	2010	2011	2012
Giro d'Italia	—	—	DNF	—	151
Tour de France	Did not contest during his career				
Vuelta a España	86	101	—	—	118

Legend
—	Did not compete
DNF	Did not finish
