= Tormod Hausken Jacobsen =

Norwegian cyclist

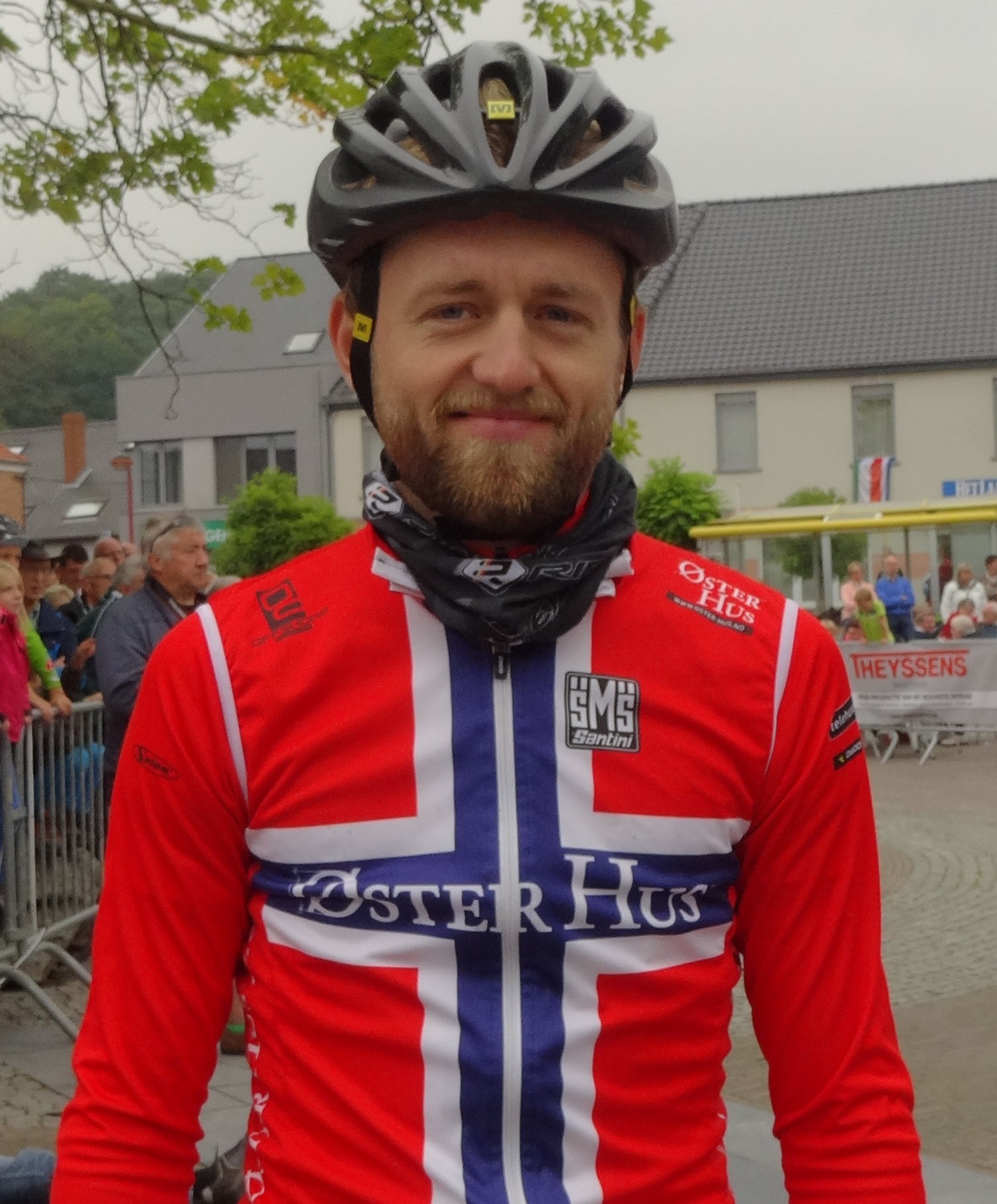
- Hausken Jacobsen in 2014

Personal information
- Full name: Tormod Hausken Jacobsen
- Born: 17 August 1993 (age 33) Stavanger, Norway

Cycling career
- Sport: Cycling
- Current team: Retired
- Discipline: Road
- Role: Rider

Amateur team
- 2006–2012: Strand Stavanger SK

Professional teams
- 2012: Team Øster Hus–Ridley (stagiaire)
- 2013–2015: Team Øster Hus–Ridley

Tormod Hausken Jacobsen (born 17 August 1993) is a Norwegian former professional racing cyclist. He won the Norwegian National Road Race Championships in 2014.

== Major results ==
2014
1st Road race, National Road Championships
9th Eschborn-Frankfurt City Loop U23
