= Erlend Engelsvoll =

Norwegian cyclist

Personal information
- Born: 17 November 1975 (age 50)

Cycling career
- Sport: Cycling
- Role: Rider

Erlend Engelsvoll (born 17 November 1975) is a Norwegian former professional racing cyclist. He won the Norwegian National Road Race Championship in 2001.
