= Odd Westbye =

Norwegian cyclist

Cycling career
- Sport: Cycling
- Role: Rider

Odd Westbye is a Norwegian former professional racing cyclist. He won the Norwegian National Road Race Championship in 1940.
