= Finn Vegard Nordhagen =

Norwegian cyclist

Cycling career
- Sport: Cycling
- Role: Rider

Finn Vegard Nordhagen is a Norwegian former professional racing cyclist. He won the Norwegian National Road Race Championship in 1989.
