= Frode Flesjå =

Norwegian cyclist

Personal information
- Born: 31 December 1973 (age 52)

Cycling career
- Sport: Cycling
- Role: Rider

Frode Flesjå (born 31 December 1973) is a Norwegian former professional racing cyclist. He won the Norwegian National Road Race Championship in 1996.
