= Camilla Indset Sørgjerd =

Norwegian cyclist

Personal information
- Born: 25 October 1978 (age 47)

Cycling career
- Sport: Cycling
- Role: Rider

Camilla Indset Sørgjerd (born 25 October 1978) is a Norwegian professional racing cyclist. She won the Norwegian National Road Race Championship in 2014.
