= Jørn Skaane =

Norwegian cyclist

Cycling career
- Sport: Cycling
- Role: Rider

Jørn Skaane is a Norwegian former professional racing cyclist. He won the Norwegian National Road Race Championship in 1987.
