= Per Thorkildsen =

Norwegian cyclist

Cycling career
- Sport: Cycling
- Role: Rider

Per Thorkildsen is a Norwegian former professional racing cyclist. He won the Norwegian National Road Race Championship in 1948.
