= Oscar Landa =

Norwegian cyclist

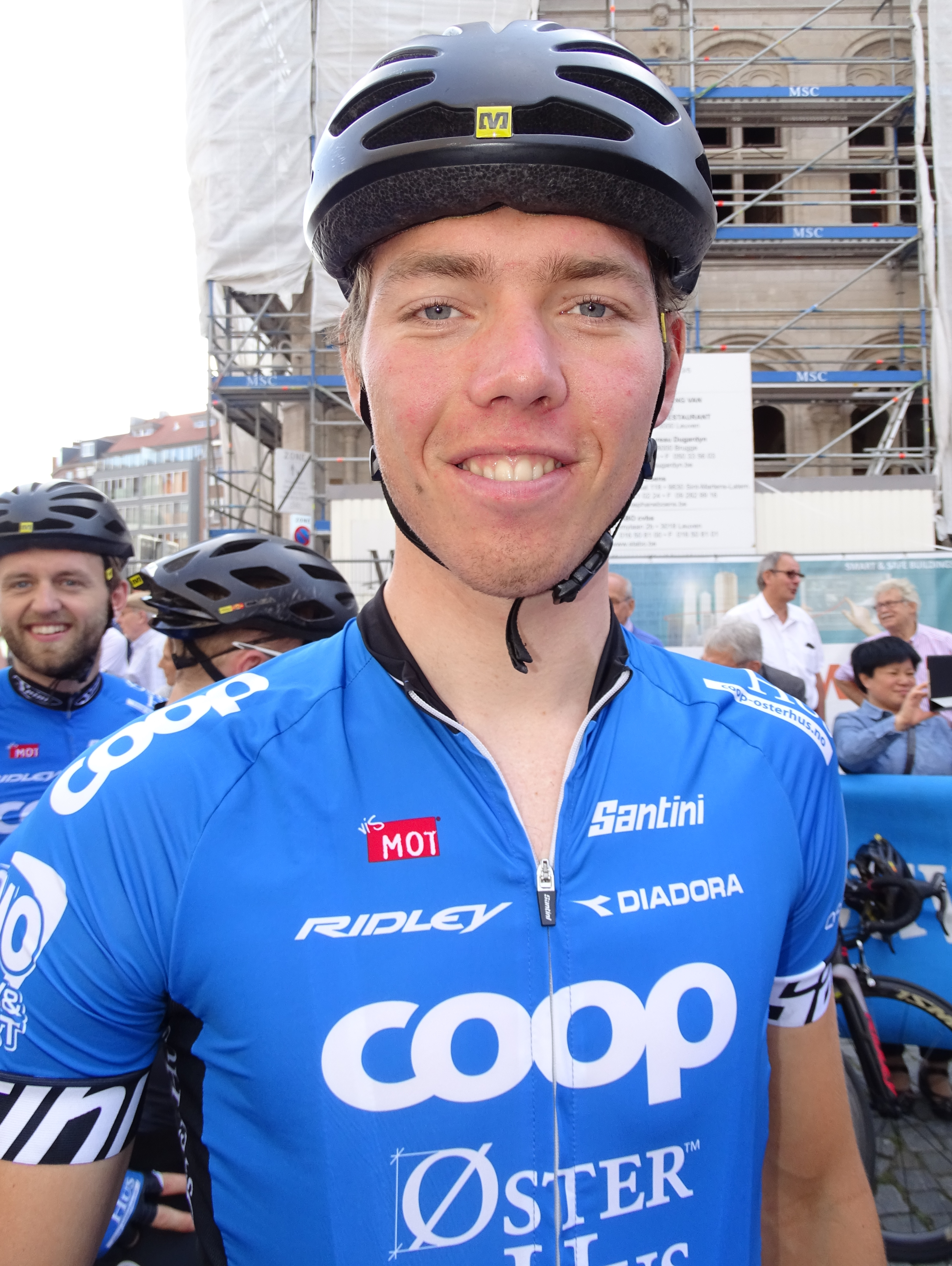
- Landa in August 2015

Personal information
- Full name: Oscar Emil Landa
- Born: 15 August 1993 (age 33) Stavanger, Norway

Cycling career
- Sport: Cycling
- Current team: Retired
- Discipline: Road
- Role: Rider

Professional team
- 2013–2016: Team Øster Hus–Ridley

Oscar Emil Landa (born 15 August 1993) is a Norwegian former road cyclist.

== Major results ==
2011
1st Road race, National Junior Road Championships
2013
2nd Trofej Umag
10th Poreč Trophy
2015
1st GP Viborg
