= Johnny Sæther =

Norwegian cyclist

Cycling career
- Sport: Cycling
- Role: Rider

Johnny Sæther is a Norwegian former professional racing cyclist. He won the Norwegian National Road Race Championship in 1993.
