= Kjell Pedersen =

Norwegian cyclist

Cycling career
- Sport: Cycling
- Role: Rider

Kjell Pedersen is a Norwegian former professional racing cyclist. He won the Norwegian National Road Race Championship in 1954 and 1958.
