= Kristoffer Skjerping =

Norwegian cyclist (born 1993)

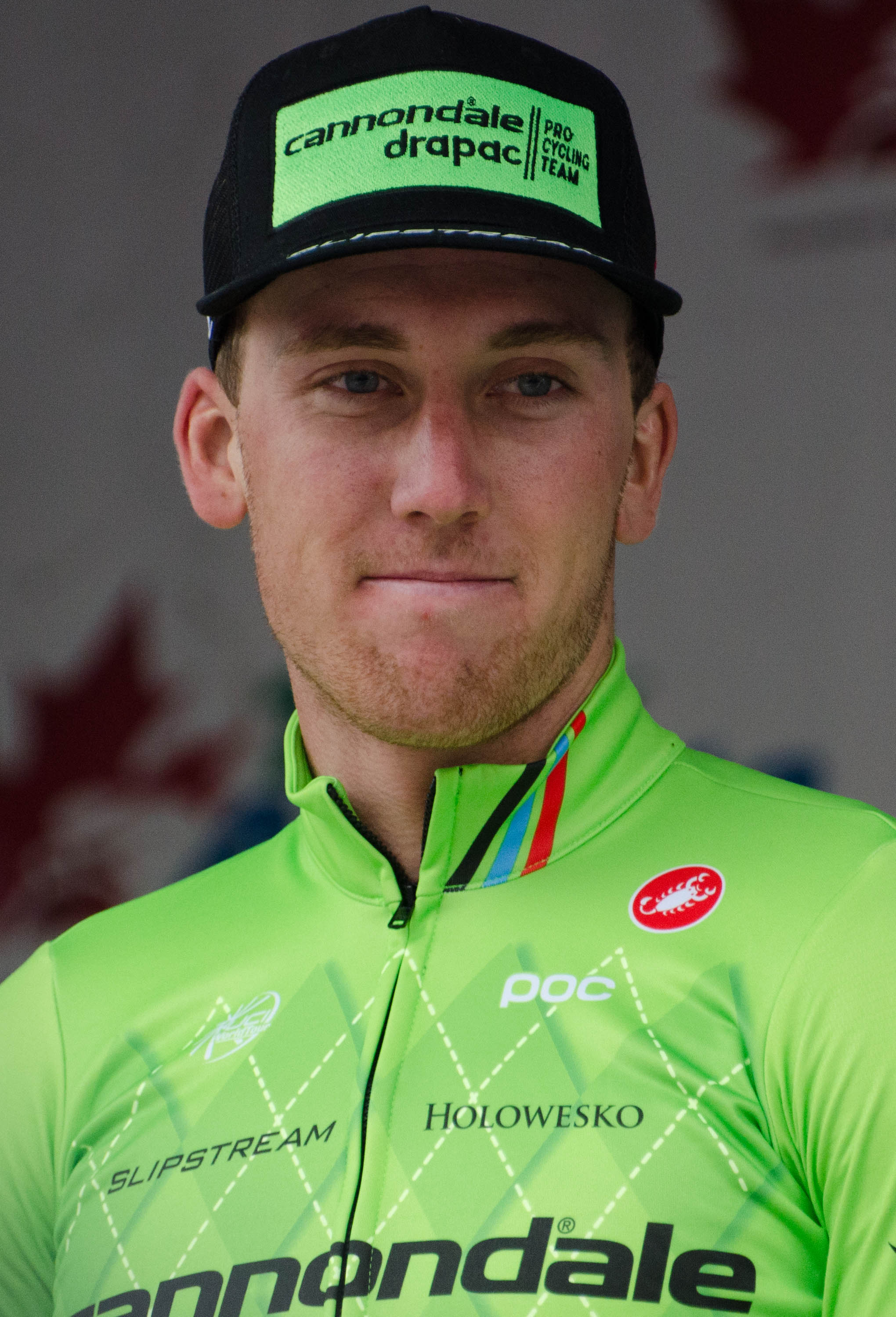
- Skjerping at the 2016 Tour of Alberta

Personal information
- Full name: Kristoffer Skjerping
- Born: 4 May 1993 (age 33) Bergen, Norway
- Height: 1.83 m (6 ft 0 in)
- Weight: 69 kg (152 lb)

Cycling career
- Sport: Cycling
- Current team: Kjekkas IF Sykkel
- Discipline: Road
- Role: Rider
- Rider type: Classics specialist

Amateur teams
- 2011: Glamdal SK
- 2022–: Kjekkas IF Sykkel

Professional teams
- 2012–2014: Joker–Merida
- 2015–2016: Cannondale–Garmin
- 2017–2018: Joker Icopal
- 2019: Uno-X Norwegian Development Team
Medal record
Representing Norway
Men's road bicycle racing
World Championships
Bronze medal – third place	2014 Ponferrada	Under-23 road race

Kristoffer Skjerping (born 4 May 1993) is a Norwegian road racing cyclist, who currently rides for amateur team Kjekkas IF Sykkel. He previously rode professionally between 2012 and 2019 for the Cannondale–Drapac, Joker Icopal (over two spells) and Uno-X Norwegian Development Team teams.

== Biography ==
Born on 4 May 1993, in Bergen, Norway, Skjerping spent his adolescence in Sotra, Norway. Skjerping resides in Gjerdrum, Norway.

Between 2012 and 2014, Skjerping competed with Joker–Merida, a UCI Continental team.

Skjerping signed with Cannondale–Garmin, a UCI ProTeam, for the 2015 and 2016 seasons.

== Major results ==
2010
2nd Road race, National Junior Road Championships
5th Overall Niedersachsen Rundfahrt Juniors
2011
National Junior Road Championships

1st Time trial
3rd Road race

2012
2nd Ringerike GP
2013
1st Road race, National Under-23 Road Championships
9th Ringerike GP
2014
1st Stage 1 Tour de l'Avenir
2nd Paris–Troyes
2nd Ronde Van Vlaanderen Beloften
3rd Road race, UCI Under-23 Road World Championships
3rd Ringerike GP
2016
1st Stage 1 (TTT) Czech Cycling Tour
2017
3rd Time trial, National Road Championships
5th Grand Prix de la Ville de Lillers
5th Grote Prijs Stad Zottegem
7th Overall Tour de Bretagne
2018
3rd Time trial, National Road Championships
2019
1st Ringerike GP
1st Gylne Gutuer
7th Himmerland Rundt
2023
3rd Gylne Gutuer
4th Overall Baltic Chain Tour
