= Fredrik Kveil =

Norwegian cyclist

Cycling career
- Sport: Cycling
- Role: Rider

Fredrik Kveil is a Norwegian former professional racing cyclist. He won the Norwegian National Road Race Championship in 1962 and 1963.
