= Rune Jogert =

Norwegian cyclist

Personal information
- Born: 15 February 1977 (age 49)

Cycling career
- Sport: Cycling
- Role: Rider

Rune Jogert (born 15 February 1977) is a Norwegian former professional racing cyclist. He won the Norwegian National Road Race Championship in 2000.

== Doping ==
Jogert tested positive for ephedrine at the Berliner 4-Etappen-Fahrt in 1997 and was subsequently handed a two-month ban by CAS, after the Norwegian Cycling Federation had neglected to inform the UCI about the result.
