= Tord Gudmestad =

Norwegian cyclist

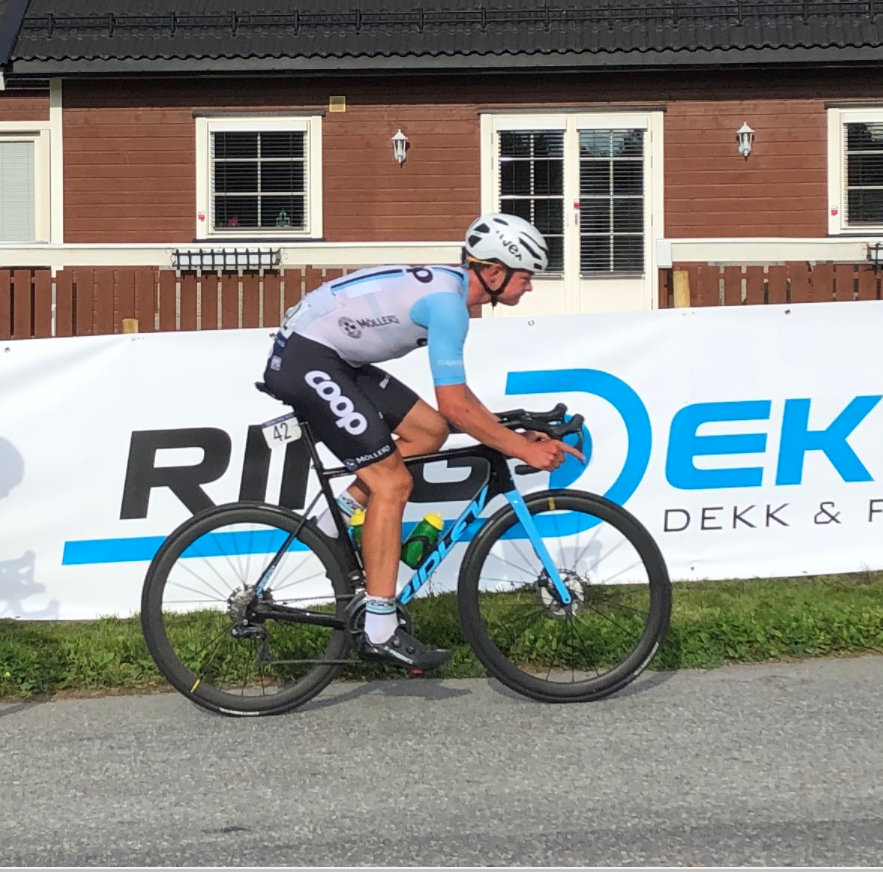
- Gudmestad in 2020

Personal information
- Born: 8 May 2001 (age 25) Nærbø, Norway
- Height: 1.87 m (6 ft 2 in)

Cycling career
- Sport: Cycling
- Current team: Decathlon CMA CGM Team
- Discipline: Road
- Role: Rider

Amateur team
- 2019: Stavanger SK

Professional teams
- 2020–2021: Team Coop
- 2022–2024: Uno-X Pro Cycling Team
- 2025–: Decathlon–AG2R La Mondiale

Tord Gudmestad (born 8 May 2001) is a Norwegian professional road cyclist, who currently rides for UCI WorldTeam Decathlon CMA CGM Team.

== Major results ==
2018
1st Road race, National Junior Road Championships
2020
7th Gylne Gutuer
10th Hafjell GP
2021
1st Road race, National Under-23 Road Championships
1st International Rhodes Grand Prix
Dookoła Mazowsza

1st Points classification
1st Stages 2 & 3

2nd Puchar Ministra Obrony Narodowej
4th Himmerland Rundt
5th Overall Orlen Nations Grand Prix
2022
1st Mountains classification, Tour Poitou-Charentes en Nouvelle-Aquitaine
1st Grand Prix Megasaray
2023
9th La Roue Tourangelle
10th Route Adélie de Vitré
2024 (1 pro win)
1st Veenendaal–Veenendaal
5th Heistse Pijl
7th Circuit de Wallonie
8th Rund um Köln
9th Elfstedenronde
2026
2nd Classic Var
4th Copenhagen Sprint
