= Tone Benjaminsen =

Norwegian cyclist

Cycling career
- Sport: Cycling
- Role: Rider
- Rider type: Sprinter

Tone Benjaminsen is a Norwegian former professional racing cyclist. She won the Norwegian National Road Race Championship in 1985, 1986 and time trail in 1988. In 1987 she won the Nordic Championship Road Race in Finland.
