= Jon Rangfred Hanssen =

Norwegian cyclist

Personal information
- Born: 19 June 1956 (age 70)

Cycling career
- Sport: Cycling
- Role: Rider

Jon Rangfred Hanssen (born 19 June 1956) is a Norwegian former racing cyclist. He won the Norwegian National Road Race Championship in 1980.
