= Svein Gaute Hølestøl =

Norwegian cyclist

- Born: 1 March 1971 (age 55); Stavanger, Norway
- Occupation: Cyclist

Svein Gaute Hølestøl (born 1 March 1971) is a Norwegian former professional cyclist. He was born in Stavanger. He competed at the 1996 and 2000 Summer Olympics. He won the 1999 Norwegian National Road Race Championships and the 2000 Norwegian National Time Trial Championships.
