= Ragnhild Kostøl =

Norwegian cyclist

Personal information
- Nationality: Norwegian
- Born: 25 May 1969 (age 56); Oslo

Sport
- Sport: Cycling

Ragnhild Kostøl (born 25 May 1969) is a Norwegian cyclist. She was born in Oslo. She won the Norwegian National Road Race Championship in 1991 and 1999.

She competed at the 1996 and the 2000 Summer Olympics.
