= Stein Bråthen =

Norwegian cyclist

Personal information
- Born: 26 August 1954 (age 72) Oslo, Norway

Cycling career
- Sport: Cycling

Stein Bråthen (born 26 August 1954) is a Norwegian cyclist. He was born in Oslo. He competed at the 1976 Summer Olympics in Montreal, where he placed eighth in the team time trial with the Norwegian team, which consisted of Geir Digerud, Arne Klavenes, Magne Orre and Bråthen
