= Ingunn Bollerud =

Norwegian cyclist

Personal information
- Born: 16 November 1972 (age 53) Nes, Akershus, Norway

Cycling career
- Sport: Cycling

Ingunn Bollerud (born 16 November 1972) is a Norwegian former cyclist. She was born in Nes municipality in Akershus. She won the Norwegian National Road Race Championship in 1996.

She competed at the 1992, 1996 and 2000 Summer Olympics.
