= Arne Klavenes =

Norwegian cyclist

Personal information
- Born: 26 July 1952 (age 74) Holmestrand, Norway

Cycling career
- Sport: Cycling

Arne Klavenes (born 26 July 1952) is a Norwegian cyclist. He was born in Holmestrand. He competed at the 1976 Summer Olympics in Montreal, where he placed eighth in the team time trial with the Norwegian team, which consisted of Geir Digerud, Stein Bråthen, Magne Orre and Klavenes.
