= Tom Martin Biseth =

Norwegian cyclist

Personal information
- Born: 29 March 1946 (age 80) Tønsberg, Norway

Cycling career
- Sport: Cycling
- Role: Rider

Tom Martin Biseth (born 29 March 1946) is a Norwegian former professional racing cyclist. He won the Norwegian National Road Race Championship in 1970 and 1974.
