= Nicole Vermast =

Dutch cyclist (born 1968)

Personal information
- Born: 6 March 1968 (age 58) Netherlands

Cycling career
- Sport: Cycling
- Discipline: Road cycling

Professional teams
- 1997: VKS
- 1998: Opstalan

Nicole Vermast (born 6 March 1968) is a road cyclist from the Netherlands. She represented her nation at the 1998 UCI Road World Championships.
