= Oksana Saprykina =

Ukrainian cyclist

Personal information
- Full name: Oksana Saprykina
- Born: 18 January 1979 (age 47) Ukrainian SSR, Soviet Union
- Height: 172 cm (5 ft 8 in)
- Weight: 55 kg (121 lb)

Cycling career
- Sport: Cycling
- Discipline: Road cycling

Oksana Saprykina (Original name Оксана Саприкіна; born 18 January 1979) is a road cyclist from Ukraine. She represented her nation at the 2000 Summer Olympics.
