= Bo André Namtvedt =

Norwegian cyclist

Personal information
- Born: 6 February 1967 (age 59) Hordaland, Norway

Cycling career
- Sport: Cycling
- Role: Rider

Bo André Namtvedt (born 6 February 1967) is a Norwegian former professional racing cyclist. He won the Norwegian National Road Race Championship in 1991 and 1995.
