= Monica Valvik =

Norwegian cyclist

Monica Valen
Personal information
- Full name: Grethe Monica Eikild Valen
- Born: 15 September 1970 (age 56) Skien, Norway

Cycling career
- Sport: Cycling
- Discipline: Road
- Role: Rider
Medal record
Representing Norway
Women's road cycling
World Championships
Gold medal – first place	1994 Agrigento	Road race

Grethe Monica Eikild Valen (born 15 September 1970) is a Norwegian racing cyclist. She won the Norwegian National Road Race Championship five times in the 1990s.

She was born in Skien and is the sister of Anita Valen. She was married to Svein Inge Valvik.

She competed at the 1992 Summer Olympics, where she placed fifth, and at the 2000 Summer Olympics, where she placed 29th. She won a gold medal at the 1994 UCI Road World Championships.
