= Morten Christiansen (cyclist) =

Norwegian cyclist

Personal information
- Born: 16 May 1974 (age 52)

Cycling career
- Sport: Cycling
- Role: Rider

Morten Christiansenl (born 16 May 1974) is a Norwegian former professional racing cyclist. He won the Norwegian National Road Race Championship in 2005.
