= Jorunn Kvalø =

Norwegian cyclist

Personal information
- Born: 9 July 1975 (age 51)

Cycling career
- Sport: Cycling
- Role: Rider

Jorunn Kvalø (born 15 July 1975) is a Norwegian former professional racing cyclist. She won the Norwegian National Road Race Championship in 1995.
