= Mads Kaggestad =

Norwegian cyclist

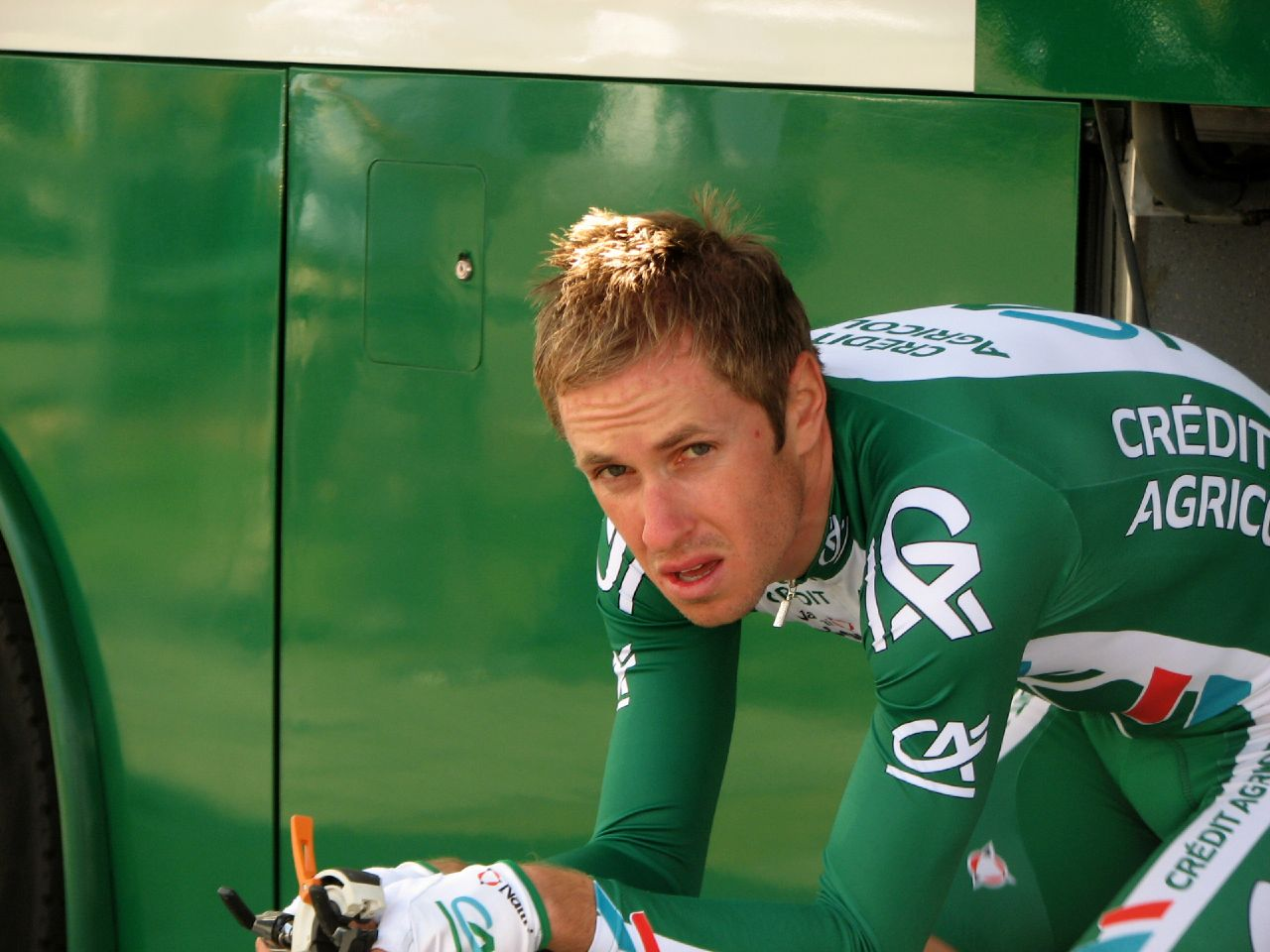
- Kaggestad in 2007

Personal information
- Born: 22 February 1977 (age 49)

Cycling career
- Sport: Cycling
- Current team: Retired
- Role: Rider

Professional teams
- 2002: Team Krone
- 2004: Norwegian Olympic Cycling Team
- 2003–2007: Crédit Agricole

Mads Petter Kaggestad (born 22 February 1977) is a former Norwegian professional road racing cyclist. He competed for the French Crédit Agricole team between 2003 and 2007. During 2002 he was a member of the amateur Team Krone. He competed in the men's individual road race at the 2004 Summer Olympics.

He hails from Modum and is the son of Johan Kaggestad, an athletics coach and television commentator.

== Race won ==
2002
Ringerike GP
