= May Britt Nilsen =

Norwegian cyclist and speed skater (born 1958)

Personal information
- Born: 9 April 1958 (age 68)

Cycling career
- Sport: Cycling
- Role: Rider

May Britt Nilsen (born 9 April 1958) is a Norwegian former professional racing cyclist. She won the Norwegian National Road Race Championship five times in the 1970s.
