= GP Viborg =

Danish one-day road cycling race

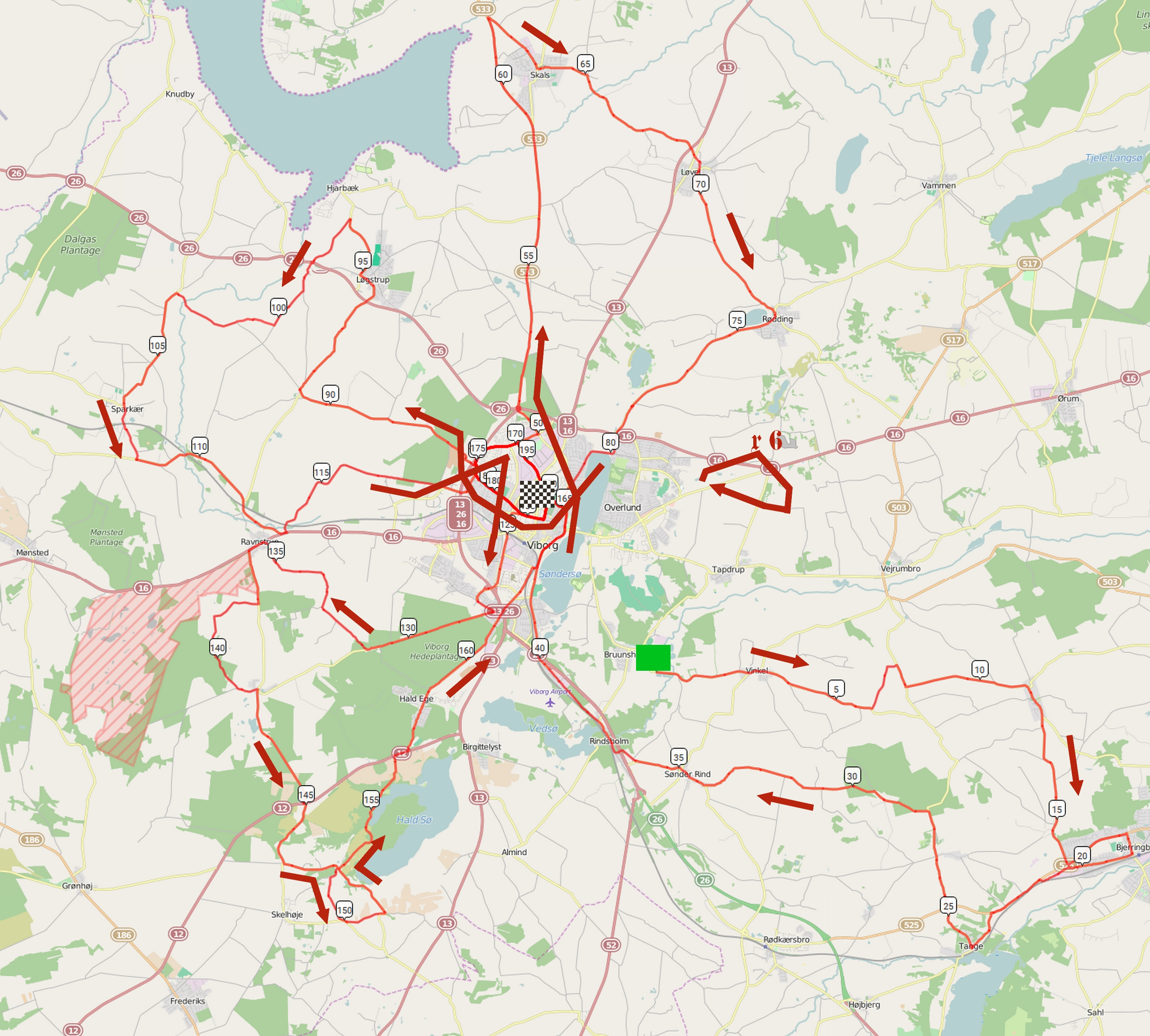
- 2015 GP Viborg

Race details
- Date: April/May
- Region: Denmark
- Discipline: Road
- Competition: UCI Europe Tour 1.2
- Type: One-day race
- Web site: www.gpviborg.dk

History
- First edition: 2013
- Editions: 5 (as of 2017)
- First winner: Constantino Zaballa (ESP)
- Most wins: No repeat winners
- Most recent: Kasper Asgreen (DEN)

The GP Viborg is a cycling race held in Denmark. It is part of UCI Europe Tour in category 1.2. It was known as Destination Thy in 2013 and 2014.

== Winners ==
Year	Country	Rider	Team
2013	Spain	Constantino Zaballa	Christina Watches–Onfone
2014	Denmark	Magnus Cort	Cult Energy–Vital Water
2015	Norway	Oscar Landa	Team Coop–Øster Hus
2016	Netherlands	Johim Ariesen	Metec–TKH
2017	Denmark	Kasper Asgreen	Team VéloCONCEPT
