= Tuija Kinnunen =

Finnish cyclist

Personal information
- Full name: Tuija Kinnunen
- Born: 10 May 1965 (age 61)

Cycling career
- Sport: Cycling
- Role: Rider

Tuija Kinnunen (born 10 May 1965) is a Finnish former racing cyclist. She finished in second place in the Finnish National Road Race Championships in 1998.
