= Team Drali–Repsol =

Norwegian cycling team

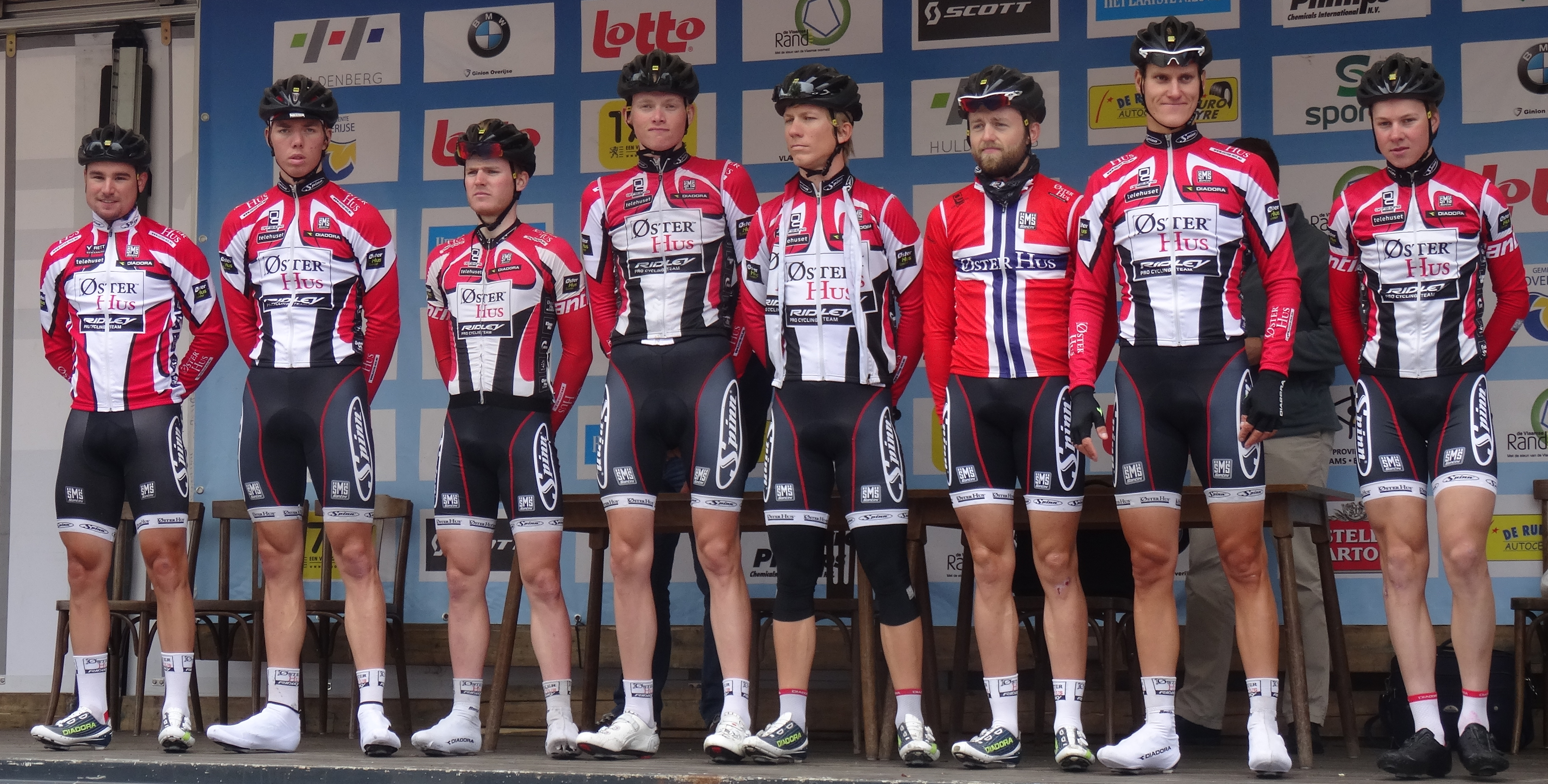

Team information
- UCI code: TCR
- Registered: Norway
- Founded: 2004
- Discipline: Road
- Status: Continental

Key personnel
- General manager: Jan Erik Fjotland
- Team managers: Magnus Børresen; Edward de Weerdt; Gilbert de Weerdt

Team name history
- 2004–2008 2009–2011 2012–2014 2015–2016 2017–2022 2023–2025 2026–: Team Sparebanken Vest; Sparebanken Vest–Ridley; Team Øster Hus–Ridley; Team Coop–Øster Hus; Team Coop; Team Coop–Repsol; Team Drali–Repsol
Jersey

Team Drali–Repsol (UCI team code: TCR) is a UCI Continental cycling team based in Norway. It is managed by Jan Erik Fjotland with the help of Magnus Børresen, Edward de Weerdt and Gilbert de Weerdt.

== Team roster ==
As of 23 May 2023.

Rider	Date of birth
Håkon Aalrust (NOR)	5 January 1998 (age 28)
Cedrik Bakke Christophersen (NOR)	11 December 2001 (age 24)
André Drege (NOR)	4 May 1999 (age 27)
Karsten Larsen Feldmann (NOR)	28 March 2003 (age 23)
Amund Haakonsen (NOR)	10 October 2000 (age 25)

Rider	Date of birth
Kalle Kvam (NOR)	27 February 2003 (age 23)
Eirik Lunder (NOR)	9 June 1999 (age 27)
Johan Ravnøy (NOR)	23 November 2003 (age 22)
Anton Stensby (NOR)	17 January 2001 (age 25)
Magnus Wæhre (NOR)	2 May 2002 (age 24)

== Major wins ==
2005
Norway Road Race Championships, Morten Christiansen
Stage 5 FBD Insurance Rás, Morten Christiansen
Stage 7 FBD Insurance Rás, Morten Hegreberg
Ringerike GP, Are Andresen
2006
Stage 9 FBD Insurance Ras, Morten Hegreberg
Overall Grand Prix Cycliste de Gemenc, Martin Prázdnovský

Prologue (ITT) & Stage 2, Martin Prázdnovský

Overall Tour de Guadeloupe, Martin Prázdnovský
2008
Stage 2 Tour des Pyrénées, Stian Remme
2009
Rogaland GP, Haavard Nybö
2010
Sweden Road Race Championships, Michael Stevenson
Stage 1 Tour des Pyrénées, Roy Hegreberg
Stage 4 Tour des Pyrénées, Filip Eidsheim
2011
Stage 2a Vuelta Ciclista a León, Daniel Jarsto
2012
Eschborn-Frankfurt City Loop U23, Sven Erik Bystrøm
Kernen Omloop Echt-Susteren, Daniel Hoelgaard
2013
Hadeland GP, Fredrik Strand Galta
2014
UCI World Under-23 Road Race Championships, Sven Erik Bystrøm
Norway Road Race Championships, Tormod Hausken Jacobsen
2015
GP Viborg, Oscar Landa
Overall Kreiz Breizh Elites, August Jensen

Stages 2 & 3, Fredrik Strand Galta
Stage 4, August Jensen

2016
Overall GP Liberty Seguros, August Jensen

Stage 1, August Jensen

2017
Stage 1 East Bohemia Tour, Krister Hagen
Stage 5 Tour du Loir et Cher, August Jensen
Stages 3 & 4 Oberösterreichrundfahrt, August Jensen
Stage 3 Arctic Race of Norway, August Jensen
2018
Trofej Umag, Krister Hagen
Overall Istrian Spring Trophy, Krister Hagen
Scandinavian Race in Uppsala, Trond Trondsen
Memorial Philippe Van Coningsloo, Gustav Höög
Hansa Bygg Kalmar Grand Prix Road Race, Gustav Höög
2019
Stage 6 Tour de Normandie, Trond Trondsen
Sundvolden GP, Trond Trondsen
Stage 1 Tour d'Eure-et-Loir, Trond Trondsen
2021
Overall International Tour of Rhodes, Fredrik Dversnes
International Rhodes Grand Prix, Tord Gudmestad
Stage 1 Dookoła Mazowsza, Eirik Lunder
Stages 2 & 3 Dookoła Mazowsza, Tord Gudmestad
Puchar Ministra Obrony Narodowej, Louis Bendixen
2022
International Rhodes Grand Prix, André Drege
Overall International Tour of Rhodes, Louis Bendixen

Stages 1 & 2, Louis Bendixen

Stage 2 Tour du Loir-et-Cher, Andreas Stokbro
Stage 1 Oberösterreich Rundfahrt, Andreas Stokbro
Gylne Gutuer, André Drege
2023
Stage 2 South Aegean Tour, Cedrik Bakke Christophersen
International Rhodes Grand Prix, Eirik Lunder

== See also ==
- List of UCI professional continental and continental teams
