= Tour des Fjords =

Norwegian multi-day road cycling race

Race details
- Date: Late May
- Region: Rogaland and Hordaland, Norway
- Discipline: Road
- Competition: UCI Europe Tour
- Organiser: Tour des Fjords AS
- Web site: www.tourdesfjords.no

History
- First edition: 2008
- Editions: 11
- Final edition: 2018
- First winner: Michael Tronborg (DEN)
- Most wins: Alexander Kristoff (NOR) (2 wins)
- Final winner: Michael Albasini (SUI)

Tour des Fjords (known as the Rogaland Grand Prix until 2012) was a road bicycle race held annually between 2008 and 2018 in the region of western Norway. The race merged with the Tour of Norway prior to its 2019 edition, with Tour des Fjords AS becoming its organiser.

== Winners ==
Year	Country	Rider	Team
2008	Denmark	Michael Tronborg	Team Designa Køkken
2009	Norway	Håvard Nybø	Sparebanken Vest–Ridley
2010	Ukraine	Vitaly Popkov	ISD Continental Team
2011	Norway	Frederik Wilmann	Joker–Merida
2012	Spain	Antonio Piedra	Caja Rural
2013	Russia	Sergey Chernetskiy	Team Katusha
2014	Norway	Alexander Kristoff	Team Katusha
2015	Austria	Marco Haller	Team Katusha
2016	Norway	Alexander Kristoff	Team Katusha
2017	Norway	Edvald Boasson Hagen	Team Dimension Data
2018	Switzerland	Michael Albasini	Mitchelton–Scott
