= List of rosters for Maxbo–Bianchi and its successors =

This is a comprehensive list of the rosters of Norwegian UCI Continental cycling team, Team Joker, organised by season.

== 2020 ==
As of February 25, 2020, age as of 1 January 2020:

Rider	Date of birth
Hakon Aalrust (NOR)	5 January 1998 (aged 21)
Daniel Arnes (NOR)	6 June 2000 (aged 19)
Herman Dahl (NOR)	24 November 1993 (aged 26)
Ludvik Holstad (NOR)	1 August 1998 (aged 21)
Adne Holter (NOR)	8 July 2000 (aged 19)
Øivind Lukkedahl (NOR)	19 June 1994 (aged 25)

Rider	Date of birth
Sondre Midtsveen (NOR)	11 September 1997 (aged 22)
Fridtjof Røinås (NOR)	2 August 1994 (aged 25)
Andreas Staune-Mittet (NOR)	5 July 1998 (aged 21)
Marius Wold (NOR)	16 July 1998 (aged 21)
Søren Wærenskjold (NOR)	12 March 2000 (aged 19)

== 2019 ==
Age as of 1 January 2019:

Rider	Date of birth
Aksel Aasheim (NOR)	16 May 1997 (aged 21)
Daniel Arnes (NOR)	6 June 2000 (aged 18)
Herman Dahl (NOR)	24 November 1993 (aged 25)
Henrik Evensen (NOR)	17 November 1994 (aged 24)
Ole Forfang (NOR)	22 March 1995 (aged 23)
Bjørn Tore Hoem (NOR)	12 April 1991 (aged 27)

Rider	Date of birth
Ludvik Holstad (NOR)	1 August 1998 (aged 20)
Kristian Klevjer (NOR)	17 July 1999 (aged 19)
Øivind Lukkedahl (NOR)	19 June 1994 (aged 24)
Fridtjof Røinås (NOR)	2 August 1994 (aged 24)
Andreas Vangstad (NOR)	24 March 1992 (aged 26)
Søren Wærenskjold (NOR)	12 March 2000 (aged 18)

== 2018 ==
Age as of 1 January 2018:

Rider	Date of birth
Aksel Aasheim (NOR)	16 May 1997 (aged 20)
Herman Dahl (NOR)	24 November 1993 (aged 24)
Henrik Evensen (NOR)	17 November 1994 (aged 23)
Ole Forfang (NOR)	22 March 1995 (aged 22)
Carl Fredrik Hagen (NOR)	26 September 1991 (aged 26)
Markus Hoelgaard (NOR)	4 October 1994 (aged 23)

Rider	Date of birth
Bjørn Tore Hoem (NOR)	12 April 1991 (aged 26)
Iver Knotten (NOR)	17 December 1998 (aged 19)
Fridtjof Roinas (NOR)	2 August 1994 (aged 23)
Kristoffer Skjerping (NOR)	4 May 1993 (aged 24)
Rasmus Tiller (NOR)	28 July 1996 (aged 21)
Andreas Vangstad (NOR)	24 March 1992 (aged 25)

== 2017 ==
Age as of 1 January 2017:

Rider	Date of birth
Vegard Breen (NOR)	8 February 1990 (aged 26)
Ole Forfang (NOR)	22 March 1995 (aged 21)
Tobias Foss (NOR)	25 May 1997 (aged 19)
Carl Fredrik Hagen (NOR)	26 September 1991 (aged 25)
Kristoffer Halvorsen (NOR)	13 April 1996 (aged 20)
Markus Hoelgaard (NOR)	4 October 1994 (aged 22)

Rider	Date of birth
Bjørn Tore Hoem (NOR)	12 April 1991 (aged 25)
Iver Knotten (NOR)	17 December 1998 (aged 18)
Anders Skaarseth (NOR)	7 May 1995 (aged 21)
Kristoffer Skjerping (NOR)	4 May 1993 (aged 23)
Adrian Aas Stien (NOR)	28 October 1992 (aged 24)
Rasmus Fossum Tiller (NOR)	28 July 1996 (aged 23)

== 2016 ==
Roster in 2016, age as of 1 January 2016:

Rider	Date of birth
Reidar Borgersen (NOR)	10 May 1980 (aged 35)
Ole Forfang (NOR)	22 March 1995 (aged 20)
Tobias Foss (NOR)	25 May 1997 (aged 18)
Kristoffer Halvorsen (NOR)	13 April 1996 (aged 19)
Daniel Hoelgaard (NOR)	7 January 1993 (aged 22)
Bjørn Tore Hoem (NOR)	12 April 1991 (aged 24)
Amund Grøndahl Jansen (NOR)	11 February 1994 (aged 21)

Rider	Date of birth
Truls Korsæth (NOR)	16 September 1993 (aged 22)
Philip Lindau (SWE)	18 August 1991 (aged 24)
Anders Skaarseth (NOR)	7 May 1995 (aged 20)
Torjus Sleen (NOR)	30 March 1997 (aged 18)
Adrian Aas Stien (NOR)	28 October 1992 (aged 23)
Edvin Wilson (SWE)	25 April 1989 (aged 26)

== 2015 ==
Roster in 2015, age as of 1 January 2015:

Rider	Date of birth
Reidar Borgersen (NOR)	10 May 1980 (aged 34)
Odd Christian Eiking (NOR)	28 December 1994 (aged 20)
Kristoffer Halvorsen (NOR)	13 April 1996 (aged 18)
Daniel Hoelgaard (NOR)	7 January 1993 (aged 21)
Bjørn Tore Hoem (NOR)	12 April 1991 (aged 23)
Amund Grøndahl Jansen (NOR)	11 February 1994 (aged 20)
Truls Korsæth (NOR)	16 September 1993 (aged 21)

Rider	Date of birth
Vegard Stake Laengen (NOR)	7 February 1989 (aged 25)
Philip Lindau (SWE)	18 August 1991 (aged 23)
Sindre Lunke (NOR)	17 April 1993 (aged 21)
Anders Skaarseth (NOR)	7 May 1995 (aged 19)
Adrian Aas Stien (NOR)	28 October 1992 (aged 22)
Edvin Wilson (SWE)	25 April 1989 (aged 25)

== 2014 ==
Roster in 2014, age as of 1 January 2014:

Rider	Date of birth
Reidar Borgersen (NOR)	10 May 1980 (aged 33)
Vegard Robinson Bugge (NOR)	7 December 1989 (aged 24)
Odd Christian Eiking (NOR)	28 December 1994 (aged 19)
Truls Korsæth (NOR)	16 September 1993 (aged 20)
Philip Lindau (SWE)	18 August 1991 (aged 22)
Martin Olsen (NOR)	8 January 1992 (aged 21)

Rider	Date of birth
Jo Kogstad Ringheim (NOR)	12 February 1991 (aged 22)
Anders Skaarseth (NOR)	7 May 1995 (aged 18)
Kristoffer Skjerping (NOR)	4 May 1993 (aged 20)
Adrian Aas Stien (NOR)	28 October 1992 (aged 21)
Oskar Svendsen (NOR)	10 April 1994 (aged 19)
Edvin Wilson (SWE)	25 April 1989 (aged 24)

== 2013 ==
Roster in 2013, age as of 1 January 2013:

Rider	Date of birth
Reidar Borgersen (NOR)	10 May 1980 (aged 32)
Vegard Breen (NOR)	8 February 1990 (aged 22)
Vegard Robinson Bugge (NOR)	7 December 1989 (aged 23)
Audun Fløtten (NOR)	20 August 1990 (aged 22)
Adrian Gjølberg (NOR)	23 February 1989 (aged 23)
Christer Jensen (NOR)	19 February 1990 (aged 22)
Truls Korsæth (NOR)	16 September 1993 (aged 19)

Rider	Date of birth
Martin Olsen (NOR)	8 January 1992 (aged 20)
Stian Remme (NOR)	4 June 1982 (aged 30)
Kristoffer Skjerping (NOR)	4 May 1993 (aged 19)
Sondre Gjerdevik Sørtveit (NOR)	15 August 1988 (aged 24)
Oskar Svendsen (NOR)	10 April 1994 (aged 18)
Edvin Wilson (SWE)	25 April 1989 (aged 23)

== 2010 ==
Roster in 2010, age as of 1 January 2010:

Rider	Date of birth
Vegard Breen (NOR)	8 February 1990 (aged 19)
Vegard Robinson Bugge (NOR)	7 December 1989 (aged 20)
Ole Haavardsholm (NOR)	18 July 1989 (aged 20)
Vegard Stake Laengen (NOR)	7 February 1989 (aged 20)
Christer Rake (NOR)	19 March 1987 (aged 22)

Rider	Date of birth
Stian Remme (NOR)	4 June 1982 (aged 27)
Sondre Gjerdevik Sørtveit (NOR)	15 August 1988 (aged 21)
Ingar Stokstad (NOR)	16 December 1989 (aged 20)
Svein Erik Vold (NOR)	31 October 1985 (aged 24)

== 2009 ==
Roster in 2009, age as of 1 January 2009:

Rider	Date of birth
Magnus Espeland (NOR)	1 August 1983 (aged 25)
Ole Haavardsholm (NOR)	18 July 1989 (aged 19)
Alexander Kristoff (NOR)	5 July 1987 (aged 21)
Vegard Stake Laengen (NOR)	7 February 1989 (aged 19)
Lars Petter Nordhaug (NOR)	14 May 1984 (aged 24)
Stian Remme (NOR)	4 June 1982 (aged 26)

Rider	Date of birth
Sondre Gjerdevik Sørtveit (NOR)	15 August 1988 (aged 20)
Sten Stenersen (NOR)	15 August 1988 (aged 20)
Ingar Stokstad (NOR)	16 December 1989 (aged 19)
Svein Erik Vold (NOR)	31 October 1985 (aged 23)
Frederik Wilmann (NOR)	17 July 1985 (aged 23)

== 2008 ==
Roster in 2008, age as of 1 January 2008:

Rider	Date of birth
Joachim Bøhler (NOR)	19 July 1980 (aged 27)
Ole Haavardsholm (NOR)	18 July 1989 (aged 18)
Alexander Kristoff (NOR)	5 July 1987 (aged 20)
Lars Petter Nordhaug (NOR)	14 May 1984 (aged 23)
Stian Sommerseth (NOR)	24 May 1985 (aged 22)

Rider	Date of birth
Sten Stenersen (NOR)	15 August 1988 (aged 19)
Ingar Stokstad (NOR)	16 December 1989 (aged 18)
Svein Erik Vold (NOR)	31 October 1985 (aged 22)
Frederik Wilmann (NOR)	17 July 1985 (aged 22)

== 2007 ==
Roster in 2007, age as of 1 January 2007:

Rider	Date of birth
Edvald Boasson Hagen (NOR)	17 May 1987 (aged 19)
Joachim Bøhler (NOR)	19 July 1980 (aged 26)
Alexander Kristoff (NOR)	5 July 1987 (aged 19)
Lars Petter Nordhaug (NOR)	14 May 1984 (aged 22)
Gabriel Rasch (NOR)	8 April 1976 (aged 30)

Rider	Date of birth
Stian Sommerseth (NOR)	24 May 1985 (aged 21)
Sten Stenersen (NOR)	15 August 1988 (aged 18)
Svein Erik Vold (NOR)	31 October 1985 (aged 21)
Frederik Wilmann (NOR)	17 July 1985 (aged 21)

== 2006 ==
Roster in 2006, age as of 1 January 2006:

Rider	Date of birth
Edvald Boasson Hagen (NOR)	17 May 1987 (aged 18)
Joachim Bøhler (NOR)	19 July 1980 (aged 25)
Christopher Myhre (NOR)	28 February 1983 (aged 22)
Lars Petter Nordhaug (NOR)	14 May 1984 (aged 21)
Gabriel Rasch (NOR)	8 April 1976 (aged 29)

Rider	Date of birth
Leonard Snoeks (NOR)	26 February 1985 (aged 20)
Stian Sommerseth (NOR)	24 May 1985 (aged 20)
Svein Erik Vold (NOR)	31 October 1985 (aged 20)
Frederik Wilmann (NOR)	17 July 1985 (aged 20)

== 2005 ==
Roster in 2005, age as of 1 January 2005:

Rider	Date of birth
Joachim Bøhler (NOR)	19 July 1980 (aged 25)
Petter Jørgensen (NOR)	10 October 1980 (aged 25)
Christopher Myhre (NOR)	28 February 1983 (aged 22)
Lars Petter Nordhaug (NOR)	14 May 1984 (aged 21)

Rider	Date of birth
Leonard Snoeks (NOR)	26 February 1985 (aged 20)
Stian Sommerseth (NOR)	24 May 1985 (aged 20)
Svein Erik Vold (NOR)	31 October 1985 (aged 20)
Frederik Wilmann (NOR)	17 July 1985 (aged 20)
