= 2018 Tour des Fjords =

2018 UCI Europe Tour

Race details
- Dates: 22–24 May 2018
- Stages: 3
- Distance: 571.3 km (355.0 mi)
- Winning time: 13h 32' 01"

Results
	Winner	Michael Albasini (SUI)
	Second	Bjorg Lambrecht (BEL)
	Third	Pim Ligthart (NED)
	Points	Michael Albasini (SUI)
	Mountains	Carlos Verona (ESP)
	Youth	Bjorg Lambrecht (BEL)
	Team	Roompot–Nederlandse Loterij

The 2018 Tour des Fjords was the sixth edition of the Tour des Fjords road cycling stage race. The race was part of UCI Europe Tour in category 2.HC and was won by Swiss rider Michael Albasini of Mitchelton–BikeExchange.

== Teams ==
Twenty-one teams started the race. Each team had a maximum of six riders:

UCI WorldTeams

- Team Dimension Data
- LottoNL–Jumbo
- Mitchelton–Scott
- Team Sky
- Trek–Segafredo
- EF Education First–Drapac p/b Cannondale
- Lotto–Soudal
- Quick-Step Floors
- Team Sunweb

UCI Professional Continental teams

- Aqua Blue Sport
- CCC–Sprandi–Polkowice
- Israel Cycling Academy
- Roompot–Nederlandse Loterij
- Caja Rural–Seguros RGA
- Delko–Marseille Provence KTM
- Nippo–Vini Fantini–Europa Ovini
- Sport Vlaanderen–Baloise

UCI Continental teams

- Team Coop
- Joker Icopal
- Uno-X Norwegian Development Team
- Team Virtu Cycling

== Route ==
Stage characteristics and winners
Stage	Date	Course	Distance	Type	Stage winner
1	22 May	Lindesnes to Grimstad	191.4 km (118.9 mi)	Flat stage	Fabio Jakobsen (NED)
2	23 May	Risør to Kristiansand	188.9 km (117.4 mi)	Flat stage	Michael Albasini (SUI)
3	24 May	Farsund to Egersund	191 km (119 mi)	Hilly stage	Bjorg Lambrecht (BEL)

== Stages ==
=== Stage 1 ===
Stage 1 result

Rank	Rider	Team	Time
1	Fabio Jakobsen (NED)	Quick-Step Floors	4h 22' 32"
2	Moreno Hofland (NED)	Lotto–Soudal	s.t.
3	Timo Roosen (NED)	LottoNL–Jumbo	s.t.
4	Amund Grøndahl Jansen (NOR)	LottoNL–Jumbo	s.t.
5	Edvald Boasson Hagen (NOR)	Team Dimension Data	s.t.
6	Eduard-Michael Grosu (ROM)	Nippo–Vini Fantini–Europa Ovini	s.t.
7	Nelson Soto (COL)	Caja Rural–Seguros RGA	s.t.
8	Jeroen Meijers (NED)	Roompot–Nederlandse Loterij	s.t.
9	Michael Albasini (SUI)	Mitchelton–Scott	s.t.
10	Dries Van Gestel (BEL)	Sport Vlaanderen–Baloise	s.t.

General classification after Stage 1

Rank	Rider	Team	Time
1	Fabio Jakobsen (NED)	Quick-Step Floors	4h 22' 22"
2	Moreno Hofland (NED)	Lotto–Soudal	+ 4"
3	František Sisr (CZE)	CCC–Sprandi–Polkowice	+ 5"
4	Henrik Evensen (NOR)	Joker Icopal	s.t.
5	Timo Roosen (NED)	LottoNL–Jumbo	+ 6"
6	Floris Gerts (NED)	Roompot–Nederlandse Loterij	+ 8"
7	Amund Grøndahl Jansen (NOR)	LottoNL–Jumbo	+ 10"
8	Edvald Boasson Hagen (NOR)	Team Dimension Data	s.t.
9	Eduard-Michael Grosu (ROM)	Nippo–Vini Fantini–Europa Ovini	s.t.
10	Nelson Soto (COL)	Caja Rural–Seguros RGA	s.t.

=== Stage 2 ===
Stage 2 result

Rank	Rider	Team	Time
1	Michael Albasini (SUI)	Mitchelton–Scott	4h 33' 02"
2	Pim Ligthart (NED)	Roompot–Nederlandse Loterij	s.t.
3	Kristoffer Halvorsen (NOR)	Team Sky	s.t.
4	Edvald Boasson Hagen (NOR)	Team Dimension Data	s.t.
5	Amund Grøndahl Jansen (NOR)	LottoNL–Jumbo	s.t.
6	Timo Roosen (NED)	LottoNL–Jumbo	s.t.
7	Fabio Jakobsen (NED)	Quick-Step Floors	s.t.
8	Davide Martinelli (ITA)	Quick-Step Floors	s.t.
9	Herman Dahl (NOR)	Joker Icopal	s.t.
10	Søren Kragh Andersen (DEN)	Team Sunweb	s.t.

General classification after Stage 2

Rank	Rider	Team	Time
1	Fabio Jakobsen (NED)	Quick-Step Floors	8h 55' 24"
2	Michael Albasini (SUI)	Mitchelton–Scott	s.t.
3	Pim Ligthart (NED)	Roompot–Nederlandse Loterij	+ 4"
4	František Sisr (CZE)	CCC–Sprandi–Polkowice	+ 5"
5	Michael Gogl (AUT)	Trek–Segafredo	s.t.
6	Timo Roosen (NED)	LottoNL–Jumbo	+ 6"
7	Kristoffer Halvorsen (NOR)	Team Sky	s.t.
8	Edvald Boasson Hagen (NOR)	Team Dimension Data	+ 10"
9	Amund Grøndahl Jansen (NOR)	LottoNL–Jumbo	s.t.
10	Søren Kragh Andersen (DEN)	Team Sunweb	s.t.

=== Stage 3 ===
Stage 3 result

Rank	Rider	Team	Time
1	Bjorg Lambrecht (BEL)	Lotto–Soudal	4h 36' 43"
2	Michael Albasini (SUI)	Mitchelton–Scott	s.t.
3	Edvald Boasson Hagen (NOR)	Team Dimension Data	s.t.
4	Pim Ligthart (NED)	Roompot–Nederlandse Loterij	s.t.
5	Amund Grøndahl Jansen (NOR)	LottoNL–Jumbo	+ 3"
6	August Jensen (NOR)	Israel Cycling Academy	s.t.
7	Ruben Guerreiro (POR)	Trek–Segafredo	s.t.
8	Søren Kragh Andersen (DEN)	Team Sunweb	s.t.
9	Aaron Gate (NZL)	Aqua Blue Sport	s.t.
10	Jeroen Meijers (NED)	Roompot–Nederlandse Loterij	s.t.

== Results ==
Final general classification

Rank	Rider	Team	Time
1	Michael Albasini (SUI)	Mitchelton–Scott	13h 32' 01"
2	Bjorg Lambrecht (BEL)	Lotto–Soudal	+ 6"
3	Pim Ligthart (NED)	Roompot–Nederlandse Loterij	+ 10"
4	Edvald Boasson Hagen (NOR)	Team Dimension Data	+ 12"
5	Michael Gogl (AUT)	Trek–Segafredo	+ 14"
6	Timo Roosen (NED)	LottoNL–Jumbo	+ 15"
7	Amund Grøndahl Jansen (NOR)	LottoNL–Jumbo	+ 19"
8	Søren Kragh Andersen (DEN)	Team Sunweb	s.t.
9	Jeroen Meijers (NED)	Roompot–Nederlandse Loterij	s.t.
10	Ruben Guerreiro (POR)	Trek–Segafredo	s.t.
