= 2019 Danmark Rundt =

2019 UCI Europe Tour
- Route, from the left is stage 2, 3, 1, 4, 5

Race details
- Dates: 21–25 August 2019
- Stages: 5
- Distance: 727 km (451.7 mi)

Results
Jersey awarded to the overall winner	Winner	Niklas Larsen (DEN)	(Team ColoQuick)
	Second	Jonas Vingegaard (DEN)	(Team Jumbo–Visma)
	Third	Rasmus Quaade (DEN)	(Riwal Readynez)
Jersey awarded to the points classification winner	Points	Jasper De Buyst (BEL)	(Lotto–Soudal)
Jersey awarded to the mountains classification winner	Mountains	Fridtjof Røinås (NOR)	(Joker Fuel of Norway)
Jersey awarded to the youth classification winner	Youth	Niklas Larsen (DEN)	(Team ColoQuick)
Jersey awarded to the combativity classification winner	Combativity	Torstein Træen (NOR)	(Uno-X Norwegian Development Team)
	Team	Lotto–Soudal	

The 2019 Danmark Rundt (officially PostNord Danmark Rundt 2019 for sponsorship reasons) is a men's road bicycle race which was held from 21 August to 25 August 2019. It was the 29th edition of Danmark Rundt, which was established in 1985. The race was rated as a 2.HC event and formed part of the 2019 UCI Europe Tour. The race was made up of five stages over five days and includes an individual time trial.

== Teams ==
A total of 20 teams with 6 riders each race in the 2019 Danmark Rundt: 3 UCI WorldTeams, 10 UCI Professional Continental teams, 6 UCI Continental Teams along with a Danish national team under the Team Postnord Danmark name. PostNord is the name sponsor of the race.

UCI WorldTeams

- Lotto–Soudal
- Team Jumbo–Visma
- Team Sunweb

UCI Professional Continental Teams

- Bardiani–CSF
- Corendon–Circus
- Hagens Berman Axeon
- Israel Cycling Academy
- Riwal Readynez
- Roompot–Charles
- Team Novo Nordisk
- Sport Vlaanderen–Baloise
- Vital Concept–B&B Hotels
- W52 / FC Porto

UCI Continental Teams

- BHS–Almeborg Bornholm
- Joker Fuel of Norway
- Team ColoQuick
- Hurom BDC Development
- Team Waoo
- Uno-X Norwegian Development Team

National Teams

- Team PostNord Danmark

== Schedule ==
There are five stages over five days with an individual time trial on day two.

Stage	Date	Route	Distance	Type	Stage winner
1	21 August	Silkeborg to Silkeborg	170 km (110 mi)	Flat stage	Tiesj Benoot (BEL)
2	22 August	Grindsted	17.0 km (10.6 mi)	Individual time trial	Martin Toft Madsen (DEN)
3	23 August	Holstebro to Vejle	200 km (120 mi)	Hilly stage	Lasse Norman Hansen (DEN)
4	24 August	Korsør to Asnæs Indelukke	175 km (109 mi)	Flat stage	Jasper De Buyst (BEL)
5	25 August	Roskilde to Frederiksberg	165 km (103 mi)	Flat stage	Tim Merlier (BEL)

== Stages ==
=== Stage 1 ===
21 August 2019 – Silkeborg to Silkeborg, 170 km (105.6 mi)

Stage 1 result
Rank	Rider	Team	Time
1	Tiesj Benoot (BEL)	Lotto–Soudal	3h 54' 48"
2	Jasper De Buyst (BEL)	Lotto–Soudal	+ 0"
3	Amaury Capiot (BEL)	Sport Vlaanderen–Baloise	+ 0"
4	Niklas Larsen (DEN)	Team ColoQuick	+ 0"
5	Krists Neilands (LAT)	Israel Cycling Academy	+ 0"
6	Amund Grøndahl Jansen (NOR)	Team Jumbo–Visma	+ 0"
7	Mads Würtz Schmidt (DEN)	Team PostNord Danmark	+ 0"
8	Tim Merlier (BEL)	Corendon–Circus	+ 3"
9	Bryan Coquard (FRA)	Vital Concept–B&B Hotels	+ 3"
10	Herman Dahl (NOR)	Joker Fuel of Norway	+ 3"

General classification after Stage 1
Rank	Rider	Team	Time
1	Tiesj Benoot (BEL)	Lotto–Soudal	3h 54' 38"
2	Jasper De Buyst (BEL)	Lotto–Soudal	+ 4"
3	Amaury Capiot (BEL)	Sport Vlaanderen–Baloise	+ 6"
4	Niklas Larsen (DEN)	Team ColoQuick	+ 10"
5	Krists Neilands (LAT)	Israel Cycling Academy	+ 10"
6	Amund Grøndahl Jansen (NOR)	Team Jumbo–Visma	+ 10"
7	Mads Würtz Schmidt (DEN)	Team PostNord Danmark	+ 10"
8	Torstein Traeen (NOR)	Uno-X Norwegian Development Team	+ 10"
9	Jonas Abrahamsen (NOR)	Uno-X Norwegian Development Team	+ 11"
10	Tim Merlier (BEL)	Corendon–Circus	+ 13"

=== Stage 2 ===
22 August 2019 – Grindsted, 17 km (10.6 mi), individual time trial (ITT)

Stage 2 result
Rank	Rider	Team	Time
1	Martin Toft Madsen (DEN)	BHS–Almeborg Bornholm	19' 35"
2	Rasmus Quaade (DEN)	Riwal Readynez	+ 11"
3	Mads Würtz Schmidt (DEN)	Team PostNord Danmark	+ 11"
4	Niklas Larsen (DEN)	Team ColoQuick	+ 11"
5	Mikkel Bjerg (DEN)	Hagens Berman Axeon	+ 12"
6	Brent Van Moer (BEL)	Lotto–Soudal	+ 19"
7	Jonas Vingegaard (DEN)	Team Jumbo–Visma	+ 19"
8	Lasse Norman Hansen (DEN)	Corendon–Circus	+ 20"
9	Matthias Brändle (AUT)	Israel Cycling Academy	+ 24"
10	Koen Bouwman (NED)	Team Jumbo–Visma	+ 27"

General classification after Stage 2
Rank	Rider	Team	Time
1	Mads Würtz Schmidt (DEN)	Team PostNord Danmark	4h 14' 34"
2	Niklas Larsen (DEN)	Team ColoQuick	+ 0"
3	Rasmus Quaade (DEN)	Riwal Readynez	+ 3"
4	Mikkel Bjerg (DEN)	Hagens Berman Axeon	+ 4"
5	Martin Toft Madsen (DEN)	BHS–Almeborg Bornholm	+ 10"
6	Brent Van Moer (BEL)	Lotto–Soudal	+ 11"
7	Jonas Vingegaard (DEN)	Team Jumbo–Visma	+ 11"
8	Lasse Norman Hansen (DEN)	Corendon–Circus	+ 12"
9	Tiesj Benoot (BEL)	Lotto–Soudal	+ 14"
10	Matthias Brändle (AUT)	Israel Cycling Academy	+ 16"

=== Stage 3 ===
23 August 2019 – Holstebro to Vejle, 200 km (124.3 mi)

Stage 3 result
Rank	Rider	Team	Time
1	Lasse Norman Hansen (DEN)	Corendon–Circus	4h 46' 45"
2	Jonas Vingegaard (DEN)	Team Jumbo–Visma	+ 0"
3	Niklas Larsen (DEN)	Team ColoQuick	+ 0"
4	Rasmus Quaade (DEN)	Riwal Readynez	+ 0"
5	Markus Hoelgaard (NOR)	Uno-X Norwegian Development Team	+ 7"
6	Amaury Capiot (BEL)	Sport Vlaanderen–Baloise	+ 13"
7	Jasper De Buyst (BEL)	Lotto–Soudal	+ 15"
8	Amund Grøndahl Jansen (NOR)	Team Jumbo–Visma	+ 15"
9	Tiesj Benoot (BEL)	Lotto–Soudal	+ 15"
10	Thomas Sprengers (BEL)	Sport Vlaanderen–Baloise	+ 15"

General classification after Stage 3
Rank	Rider	Team	Time
1	Niklas Larsen (DEN)	Team ColoQuick	9h 01' 15"
2	Lasse Norman Hansen (DEN)	Corendon–Circus	+ 6"
3	Rasmus Quaade (DEN)	Riwal Readynez	+ 7'
4	Jonas Vingegaard (DEN)	Team Jumbo–Visma	+ 9"
5	Mikkel Bjerg (DEN)	Hagens Berman Axeon	+ 32"
6	Tiesj Benoot (BEL)	Lotto–Soudal	+ 33"
7	Jasper De Buyst (BEL)	Lotto–Soudal	+ 36"
8	Koen Bouwman (NED)	Team Jumbo–Visma	+ 53"
9	Brent Van Moer (BEL)	Lotto–Soudal	+ 55"
10	Christoffer Lisson (DEN)	BHS–Almeborg Bornholm	+ 1' 08"

=== Stage 4 ===
24 August 2019 – Korsør to Asnæs Indelukke, 175 km (108.7 mi)

Stage 4 result
Rank	Rider	Team	Time
1	Jasper De Buyst (BEL)	Lotto–Soudal	4h 09' 38"
2	Amaury Capiot (BEL)	Sport Vlaanderen–Baloise	+ 0"
3	Huub Duyn (NED)	Roompot–Charles	+ 0"
4	Jonas Vingegaard (DEN)	Team Jumbo–Visma	+ 3"
5	Rasmus Quaade (DEN)	Riwal Readynez	+ 3"
6	Alexander Kamp (DEN)	Riwal Readynez	+ 3"
7	Niklas Larsen (DEN)	Team ColoQuick	+ 3"
8	Roy Goldstein (ISR)	Israel Cycling Academy	+ 5"
9	Gustavo César (ESP)	W52 / FC Porto	+ 5"
10	Charles Planet (FRA)	Team Novo Nordisk	+ 5"

General classification after Stage 4
Rank	Rider	Team	Time
1	Niklas Larsen (DEN)	Team ColoQuick	13h 10' 56"
2	Jonas Vingegaard (DEN)	Team Jumbo–Visma	+ 6"
3	Rasmus Quaade (DEN)	Riwal Readynez	+ 7'
4	Lasse Norman Hansen (DEN)	Corendon–Circus	+ 12"
5	Jasper De Buyst (BEL)	Lotto–Soudal	+ 23"
6	Mikkel Bjerg (DEN)	Hagens Berman Axeon	+ 34"
7	Brent Van Moer (BEL)	Lotto–Soudal	+ 1' 05"
8	Koen Bouwman (NED)	Team Jumbo–Visma	+ 1' 08"
9	Christoffer Lisson (DEN)	BHS–Almeborg Bornholm	+ 1' 16"
10	Johan Le Bon (FRA)	Vital Concept–B&B Hotels	+ 1' 19"

=== Stage 5 ===
25 August 2019 – Roskilde to Frederiksberg, 165 km (102.5 mi)

Stage 5 result
Rank	Rider	Team	Time
1	Tim Merlier (BEL)	Corendon–Circus	3h 41' 37"
2	Bryan Coquard (FRA)	Vital Concept–B&B Hotels	+ 0"
3	Jasper De Buyst (BEL)	Lotto–Soudal	+ 0"
4	Amaury Capiot (BEL)	Sport Vlaanderen–Baloise	+ 0"
5	Amund Grøndahl Jansen (NOR)	Team Jumbo–Visma	+ 0"
6	Louis Bendixen (DEN)	Team PostNord Danmark	+ 0"
7	Christoffer Lisson (DEN)	BHS–Almeborg Bornholm	+ 0"
8	Joris Nieuwenhuis (NED)	Team Sunweb	+ 0"
9	Dennis van Winden (NED)	Israel Cycling Academy	+ 0"
10	Herman Dahl (NOR)	Joker Fuel of Norway	+ 0"

General classification after Stage 5
Rank	Rider	Team	Time
1	Niklas Larsen (DEN)	Team ColoQuick	16h 52' 33"
2	Jonas Vingegaard (DEN)	Team Jumbo–Visma	+ 11"
3	Rasmus Quaade (DEN)	Riwal Readynez	+ 12'
4	Lasse Norman Hansen (DEN)	Corendon–Circus	+ 12"
5	Jasper De Buyst (BEL)	Lotto–Soudal	+ 19"
6	Mikkel Bjerg (DEN)	Hagens Berman Axeon	+ 39"
7	Brent Van Moer (BEL)	Lotto–Soudal	+ 1' 10"
8	Koen Bouwman (NED)	Team Jumbo–Visma	+ 1' 13"
9	Christoffer Lisson (DEN)	BHS–Almeborg Bornholm	+ 1' 16"
10	Edgar Pinto (POR)	W52 / FC Porto	+ 1' 23"

== Classification leadership ==
Stage	Winner	General classification	Points classification	Mountains classification	Young rider classification	Team classification	Fighter competition
1	Tiesj Benoot	Tiesj Benoot	Tiesj Benoot	Sasha Weemaes	Niklas Larsen	Lotto–Soudal	Aksel Bech Skot-Hansen
2	Martin Toft Madsen	Mads Würtz Schmidt	Niklas Larsen	Sasha Weemaes	Niklas Larsen	Lotto–Soudal	Not awarded
3	Lasse Norman Hansen	Niklas Larsen	Niklas Larsen	Fridtjof Røinås	Niklas Larsen	Team Jumbo–Visma	Torstein Træen
4	Jasper De Buyst	Niklas Larsen	Jasper De Buyst	Fridtjof Røinås	Niklas Larsen	Lotto–Soudal	Torstein Træen
5	Tim Merlier	Niklas Larsen	Jasper De Buyst	Fridtjof Røinås	Niklas Larsen	Lotto–Soudal	Torstein Træen
Final		Niklas Larsen	Jasper De Buyst	Fridtjof Røinås	Niklas Larsen	Lotto–Soudal	Torstein Træen

== Final classification standings ==
Legend
Denotes the winner of the general classification	Denotes the winner of the young rider classification
Denotes the winner of the points classification	Denotes the winner of the active rider classification
Denotes the winner of the mountains classification	Denotes the winner of the team classification

=== General classification ===
Final general classification (1-10)
Rank	Rider	Team	Time
1	Niklas Larsen (DEN)	Team ColoQuick	16h 52' 33"
2	Jonas Vingegaard (DEN)	Team Jumbo–Visma	+ 11"
3	Rasmus Quaade (DEN)	Riwal Readynez	+ 12"
4	Lasse Norman Hansen (DEN)	Corendon–Circus	+ 12"
5	Jasper De Buyst (BEL)	Lotto–Soudal	+ 19"
6	Mikkel Bjerg (DEN)	Hagens Berman Axeon	+ 39"
7	Brent Van Moer (BEL)	Lotto–Soudal	+ 1' 10"
8	Koen Bouwman (NED)	Team Jumbo–Visma	+ 1' 13"
9	Christoffer Lisson (DEN)	BHS–Almeborg Bornholm	+ 1' 16"
10	Edgar Pinto (POR)	W52 / FC Porto	+ 1' 23"

=== Points classification ===
Final points classification (1-10)
Rank	Rider	Team	Points
1	Jasper De Buyst (BEL)	Lotto–Soudal	34
2	Niklas Larsen (DEN)	Team ColoQuick	34
3	Jonas Vingegaard (DEN)	Team Jumbo–Visma	32
4	Amaury Capiot (BEL)	Sport Vlaanderen–Baloise	30
5	Rasmus Quaade (DEN)	Riwal Readynez	29
6	Lasse Norman Hansen (DEN)	Corendon–Circus	23
7	Tiesj Benoot (BEL)	Lotto–Soudal	19
8	Torstein Træen (NOR)	Uno-X Norwegian Development Team	18
9	Mads Würtz Schmidt (DEN)	Team PostNord Danmark	16
10	Martin Toft Madsen (DEN)	BHS–Almeborg Bornholm	15

=== Mountains classification ===
Final mountains classification (1-10)
Rank	Rider	Team	Points
1	Fridtjof Røinås (NOR)	Joker Fuel of Norway	84
2	Mads Rahbek (DEN)	BHS–Almeborg Bornholm	68
3	Torstein Træen (NOR)	Uno-X Norwegian Development Team	56
4	Sasha Weemaes (BEL)	Sport Vlaanderen–Baloise	36
5	Mads Würtz Schmidt (DEN)	Team PostNord Danmark	24
6	Paolo Simion (ITA)	Bardiani–CSF	20
7	Martin Salmon (GER)	Team Sunweb	16
8	Andreas Vangstad (NOR)	Joker Fuel of Norway	16
9	Umberto Poli (ITA)	Team Novo Nordisk	16
10	Silas Zacharias Clemmensen (DEN)	Team Waoo	12

=== Young rider classification ===
Final young rider classification (1-10)
Rank	Rider	Team	Time
1	Niklas Larsen (DEN)	Team ColoQuick	16h 52' 33"
2	Mikkel Bjerg (DEN)	Hagens Berman Axeon	+ 39"
3	Brent Van Moer (BEL)	Lotto–Soudal	+ 1' 10"
4	Ian Garrison (USA)	Hagens Berman Axeon	+ 1' 41"
5	Florian Stork (GER)	Team Sunweb	+ 1' 57'
6	Aaron Verwilst (BEL)	Sport Vlaanderen–Baloise	+ 3' 53"
7	Pascal Eenkhoorn (NED)	Team Jumbo–Visma	+ 4' 44"
8	André Carvalho (POR)	Hagens Berman Axeon	+ 6' 20"
9	Martin Salmon (GER)	Team Sunweb	+ 7' 59"
10	Marten Kooistra (NED)	Team Sunweb	+ 9' 27"

=== Active rider classification ===
Final active rider classification (1-8)
Rank	Rider	Team	Points
1	Torstein Træen (NOR)	Uno-X Norwegian Development Team	24
2	Martin Salmon (GER)	Team Sunweb	12
3	Aksel Bech Skot-Hansen (DEN)	Team ColoQuick	12
4	Mirco Maestri (ITA)	Bardiani–CSF	8
5	Martin Mortensen (DEN)	Team Waoo	8
6	Mads Rahbek (DEN)	BHS–Almeborg Bornholm	8
7	Paolo Simion (ITA)	Bardiani–CSF	4
8	Mads Würtz Schmidt (DEN)	Team PostNord Danmark	4

=== Teams classification ===
Final teams classification (1-10)
Rank	Team	Time
1	Lotto–Soudal	50h 41' 04"
2	Team Jumbo–Visma	+ 10"
3	W52 / FC Porto	+ 33"
4	BHS–Almeborg Bornholm	+ 50"
5	Team Sunweb	+ 1' 59"
6	Sport Vlaanderen–Baloise	+ 4' 20"
7	Hagens Berman Axeon	+ 4' 31"
8	Roompot–Charles	+ 4' 38"
9	Israel Cycling Academy	+ 4' 39"
10	Joker Fuel of Norway	+ 5' 47"
