= 2019 Arctic Race of Norway =

2019 UCI Europe Tour

Race details
- Dates: 15–18 August 2019
- Stages: 4
- Distance: 687 km (426.9 mi)
- Winning time: 14h 59' 27"

Results
| Jersey awarded to the overall winner | Winner | Alexey Lutsenko (KAZ) | (Astana) |
| | Second | Warren Barguil (FRA) | (Arkéa–Samsic) |
| | Third | Krists Neilands (LAT) | (Israel Cycling Academy) |
| Jersey awarded to the points classification winner | Points | Alexey Lutsenko (KAZ) | (Astana) |
| Jersey awarded to the mountains classification winner | Mountains | Odd Christian Eiking (NOR) | (Wanty–Gobert) |
| Jersey awarded to the youth classification winner | Youth | Krists Neilands (LAT) | (Israel Cycling Academy) |
| | Team | Astana | |

The 2019 Arctic Race of Norway was a four-stage cycling stage race that took place in Norway between 15 and 18 August. It was the seventh edition of the Arctic Race of Norway and is rated as a 2.HC event as part of the UCI Europe Tour.

== Schedule ==
Stage characteristics and winners
| Stage | Date | Course | Distance | Type | Stage winner |
|---|---|---|---|---|---|
| 1 | August 15 | Å to Leknes | 181 km (112.5 mi) | Hilly stage | Mathieu van der Poel (NED) |
| 2 | August 16 | Henningsvær to Svolvær | 164 km (101.9 mi) | Flat stage | Bryan Coquard (FRA) |
| 3 | August 17 | Sortland to Melbu (Storheia Summit) | 176.5 km (109.7 mi) | Mountain stage | Odd Christian Eiking (NOR) |
| 4 | August 18 | Lødingen to Narvik | 165.5 km (102.8 mi) | Flat stage | Markus Hoelgaard (NOR) |
| Total | | 687 km (426.9 mi) | | | |

== Teams ==
Twenty teams of up to six riders were invited to take part in the race. Of these teams, four were UCI WorldTeams, thirteen were UCI Professional Continental teams, and three were UCI Continental teams.

UCI WorldTeams

- Astana
- Team Dimension Data
- Team Jumbo–Visma
- Team Katusha–Alpecin

UCI Professional Continental Teams

- Arkéa–Samsic
- Cofidis
- Corendon–Circus
- Delko–Marseille Provence
- Euskadi–Murias
- Israel Cycling Academy
- Rally UHC Cycling
- Riwal Readynez
- Sport Vlaanderen–Baloise
- Total Direct Énergie
- Vital Concept–B&B Hotels
- Wallonie Bruxelles
- Wanty–Gobert

UCI Continental Teams

- Joker Fuel of Norway
- Team Coop
- Uno-X Norwegian Development Team

== Stages ==
=== Stage 1 ===
15 August 2019 – Å to Leknes, 181 km (112.5 mi)

Stage 1 result
| Rank | Rider | Team | Time |
|---|---|---|---|
| 1 | Mathieu van der Poel (NED) | Corendon–Circus | 3h 45' 14" |
| 2 | Danny van Poppel (NED) | Team Jumbo–Visma | + 0" |
| 3 | Andrea Pasqualon (ITA) | Wanty–Gobert | + 0" |
| 4 | Benjamin Declercq (BEL) | Sport Vlaanderen–Baloise | + 0" |
| 5 | Krists Neilands (LAT) | Israel Cycling Academy | + 0" |
| 6 | Jordi Warlop (BEL) | Sport Vlaanderen–Baloise | + 0" |
| 7 | Enrico Gasparotto (ITA) | Team Dimension Data | + 0" |
| 8 | Markus Hoelgaard (NOR) | Uno-X Norwegian Development Team | + 0" |
| 9 | Alexey Lutsenko (KAZ) | Astana | + 0" |
| 10 | Franck Bonnamour (FRA) | Arkéa–Samsic | + 0" |

General classification after Stage 1
| Rank | Rider | Team | Time |
|---|---|---|---|
| 1 | Mathieu van der Poel (NED) | Corendon–Circus | 3h 45' 04" |
| 2 | Alexey Lutsenko (KAZ) | Astana | + 3" |
| 3 | Danny van Poppel (NED) | Team Jumbo–Visma | + 4" |
| 4 | Andrea Pasqualon (ITA) | Wanty–Gobert | + 5" |
| 5 | Markus Hoelgaard (NOR) | Uno-X Norwegian Development Team | + 6" |
| 6 | Amund Grøndahl Jansen (NOR) | Team Jumbo–Visma | + 7" |
| 7 | Magnus Cort (DEN) | Astana | + 8" |
| 8 | Krists Neilands (LAT) | Israel Cycling Academy | + 9" |
| 9 | Benjamin Declercq (BEL) | Sport Vlaanderen–Baloise | + 10" |
| 10 | Jordi Warlop (BEL) | Sport Vlaanderen–Baloise | + 10" |

=== Stage 2 ===
16 August 2019 – Henningsvær to Svolvær, 164 km (101.9 mi)

Stage 2 result
| Rank | Rider | Team | Time |
|---|---|---|---|
| 1 | Bryan Coquard (FRA) | Vital Concept–B&B Hotels | 3h 31' 11" |
| 2 | Mathieu van der Poel (NED) | Corendon–Circus | + 0" |
| 3 | Christophe Laporte (FRA) | Cofidis | + 0" |
| 4 | August Jensen (NOR) | Israel Cycling Academy | + 0" |
| 5 | Louis Bendixen (DEN) | Team Coop | + 0" |
| 6 | Herman Dahl (NOR) | Joker Fuel of Norway | + 0" |
| 7 | Emīls Liepiņš (LAT) | Wallonie Bruxelles | + 0" |
| 8 | Nathan Haas (AUS) | Team Katusha–Alpecin | + 0" |
| 9 | Christophe Noppe (BEL) | Sport Vlaanderen–Baloise | + 0" |
| 10 | Jordi Warlop (BEL) | Sport Vlaanderen–Baloise | + 0" |

General classification after Stage 2
| Rank | Rider | Team | Time |
|---|---|---|---|
| 1 | Mathieu van der Poel (NED) | Corendon–Circus | 7h 16' 09" |
| 2 | Alexey Lutsenko (KAZ) | Astana | + 9" |
| 3 | Markus Hoelgaard (NOR) | Uno-X Norwegian Development Team | + 9" |
| 4 | Andrea Pasqualon (ITA) | Wanty–Gobert | + 11" |
| 5 | Christophe Laporte (FRA) | Cofidis | + 12" |
| 6 | Amund Grøndahl Jansen (NOR) | Team Jumbo–Visma | + 13" |
| 7 | Krists Neilands (LAT) | Israel Cycling Academy | + 13" |
| 8 | Magnus Cort (DEN) | Astana | + 14" |
| 9 | Jordi Warlop (BEL) | Sport Vlaanderen–Baloise | + 16" |
| 10 | Benjamin Declercq (BEL) | Sport Vlaanderen–Baloise | + 16" |

=== Stage 3 ===
17 August 2019 – Sortland to Melbu (Storheia Summit), 176.5 km (109.7 mi)

Stage 3 result
| Rank | Rider | Team | Time |
|---|---|---|---|
| 1 | Odd Christian Eiking (NOR) | Wanty–Gobert | 4h 07' 32" |
| 2 | Warren Barguil (FRA) | Arkéa–Samsic | + 5" |
| 3 | Alexey Lutsenko (KAZ) | Astana | + 13" |
| 4 | Lilian Calmejane (FRA) | Total Direct Énergie | + 17" |
| 5 | Krists Neilands (LAT) | Israel Cycling Academy | + 17" |
| 6 | Hugo Houle (CAN) | Astana | + 23" |
| 7 | Tom-Jelte Slagter (NED) | Team Dimension Data | + 32" |
| 8 | Simon Carr (GBR) | Delko–Marseille Provence | + 36" |
| 9 | Sindre Skjøstad Lunke (NOR) | Riwal Readynez | + 36" |
| 10 | Magnus Cort (DEN) | Astana | + 36" |

General classification after Stage 3
| Rank | Rider | Team | Time |
|---|---|---|---|
| 1 | Warren Barguil (FRA) | Arkéa–Samsic | 11h 23' 56" |
| 2 | Alexey Lutsenko (KAZ) | Astana | + 3" |
| 3 | Krists Neilands (LAT) | Israel Cycling Academy | + 15" |
| 4 | Lilian Calmejane (FRA) | Total Direct Énergie | + 18" |
| 5 | Hugo Houle (CAN) | Astana | + 30" |
| 6 | Magnus Cort (DEN) | Astana | + 35" |
| 7 | Sindre Skjøstad Lunke (NOR) | Riwal Readynez | + 37" |
| 8 | Enrico Gasparotto (ITA) | Team Dimension Data | + 48" |
| 9 | Brandon McNulty (USA) | Rally UHC Cycling | + 48" |
| 10 | Markus Hoelgaard (NOR) | Uno-X Norwegian Development Team | + 52" |

=== Stage 4 ===
18 August 2019 – Lødingen to Narvik, 165.5 km (102.8 mi)

Stage 4 result
| Rank | Rider | Team | Time |
|---|---|---|---|
| 1 | Markus Hoelgaard (NOR) | Uno-X Norwegian Development Team | 3h 35' 32" |
| 2 | Amund Grøndahl Jansen (NOR) | Team Jumbo–Visma | + 0" |
| 3 | Alexey Lutsenko (KAZ) | Astana | + 3" |
| 4 | Warren Barguil (FRA) | Arkéa–Samsic | + 4" |
| 5 | Kristian Sbaragli (ITA) | Israel Cycling Academy | + 4" |
| 6 | Lilian Calmejane (FRA) | Total Direct Énergie | + 4" |
| 7 | Enrico Gasparotto (ITA) | Team Dimension Data | + 4" |
| 8 | Ilnur Zakarin (RUS) | Team Katusha–Alpecin | + 4" |
| 9 | Krists Neilands (LAT) | Israel Cycling Academy | + 4" |
| 10 | Sindre Skjøstad Lunke (NOR) | Riwal Readynez | + 4" |

General classification after Stage 4
| Rank | Rider | Team | Time |
|---|---|---|---|
| 1 | Alexey Lutsenko (KAZ) | Astana | 14h 59' 27" |
| 2 | Warren Barguil (FRA) | Arkéa–Samsic | + 1" |
| 3 | Krists Neilands (LAT) | Israel Cycling Academy | + 19" |
| 4 | Lilian Calmejane (FRA) | Total Direct Énergie | + 23" |
| 5 | Hugo Houle (CAN) | Astana | + 40" |
| 6 | Sindre Skjøstad Lunke (NOR) | Riwal Readynez | + 42" |
| 7 | Markus Hoelgaard (NOR) | Uno-X Norwegian Development Team | + 43" |
| 8 | Amund Grøndahl Jansen (NOR) | Team Jumbo–Visma | + 51" |
| 9 | Enrico Gasparotto (ITA) | Team Dimension Data | + 53" |
| 10 | Steve Cummings (GBR) | Team Dimension Data | + 1' 12" |

== Classifications ==
The race included four main classifications: the general classification (represented by a yellow and orange jersey), the points classification (represented by a green jersey), the mountains classification (represented by a salmon jersey) and the youth classification (represented by a white jersey). There was also an award for the most aggressive rider on each stage and a team classification.

| Stage | Winner | General classification | Points classification | Mountains classification | Young rider classification | Teams classification | Combativity award |
|---|---|---|---|---|---|---|---|
| 1 | Mathieu van der Poel | Mathieu van der Poel | Mathieu van der Poel | Steve Cummings | Mathieu van der Poel | Sport Vlaanderen–Baloise | Alexey Lutsenko |
| 2 | Bryan Coquard | Mathieu van der Poel | Mathieu van der Poel | Steve Cummings | Mathieu van der Poel | Sport Vlaanderen–Baloise | Erik Resell |
| 3 | Odd Christian Eiking | Warren Barguil | Mathieu van der Poel | Steve Cummings | Krists Neilands | Astana | Erlend Blikra |
| 4 | Markus Hoelgaard | Alexey Lutsenko | Alexey Lutsenko | Odd Christian Eiking | Krists Neilands | Astana | Jonas Iversby Hvideberg |
| Final | | Alexey Lutsenko | Alexey Lutsenko | Odd Christian Eiking | Krists Neilands | Astana | not awarded |

== Classification standings ==
Legend
| Denotes the leader of the general classification |
| Denotes the leader of the points classification |
| Denotes the leader of the mountains classification |
| Denotes the leader of the young rider classification |
| Denotes the winner of the combativity award |

=== General classification ===
Final general classification (1-10)
| Rank | Rider | Team | Time |
|---|---|---|---|
| 1 | Alexey Lutsenko (KAZ) | Astana | 14h 59' 27" |
| 2 | Warren Barguil (FRA) | Arkéa–Samsic | + 1" |
| 3 | Krists Neilands (LAT) | Israel Cycling Academy | + 19" |
| 4 | Lilian Calmejane (FRA) | Total Direct Énergie | + 23" |
| 5 | Hugo Houle (CAN) | Astana | + 40" |
| 6 | Sindre Skjøstad Lunke (NOR) | Riwal Readynez | + 42" |
| 7 | Markus Hoelgaard (NOR) | Uno-X Norwegian Development Team | + 43" |
| 8 | Amund Grøndahl Jansen (NOR) | Team Jumbo–Visma | + 51" |
| 9 | Enrico Gasparotto (ITA) | Team Dimension Data | + 53" |
| 10 | Steve Cummings (GBR) | Team Dimension Data | + 1' 12" |

=== Points classification ===
Final points classification (1-10)
| Rank | Rider | Team | Points |
|---|---|---|---|
| 1 | Alexey Lutsenko (KAZ) | Astana | 30 |
| 2 | Mathieu van der Poel (NED) | Corendon–Circus | 27 |
| 3 | Markus Hoelgaard (NOR) | Uno-X Norwegian Development Team | 25 |
| 4 | Bryan Coquard (FRA) | Vital Concept–B&B Hotels | 24 |
| 5 | Warren Barguil (FRA) | Arkéa–Samsic | 23 |
| 6 | Krists Neilands (LAT) | Israel Cycling Academy | 18 |
| 7 | Odd Christian Eiking (NOR) | Wanty–Gobert | 15 |
| 8 | Amund Grøndahl Jansen (NOR) | Team Jumbo–Visma | 15 |
| 9 | Danny van Poppel (NED) | Team Jumbo–Visma | 14 |
| 10 | Andrea Pasqualon (ITA) | Wanty–Gobert | 10 |

=== Mountains classification ===
Final mountains classification (1-10)
| Rank | Rider | Team | Points |
|---|---|---|---|
| 1 | Odd Christian Eiking (NOR) | Wanty–Gobert | 20 |
| 2 | Steve Cummings (GBR) | Team Dimension Data | 12 |
| 3 | Jonas Iversby Hvideberg (NOR) | Uno-X Norwegian Development Team | 11 |
| 4 | Tom-Jelte Slagter (NED) | Team Dimension Data | 10 |
| 5 | Alexey Lutsenko (KAZ) | Astana | 10 |
| 6 | Warren Barguil (FRA) | Arkéa–Samsic | 8 |
| 7 | Markus Hoelgaard (NOR) | Uno-X Norwegian Development Team | 5 |
| 8 | Lilian Calmejane (FRA) | Total Direct Énergie | 5 |
| 9 | Lucas Eriksson (SWE) | Riwal Readynez | 5 |
| 10 | Danny van Poppel (NED) | Team Jumbo–Visma | 4 |

=== Young rider classification ===
Final young rider classification after stage 4 (1-10)
| Rank | Rider | Team | Time |
|---|---|---|---|
| 1 | Krists Neilands (LAT) | Israel Cycling Academy | 14h 59' 46" |
| 2 | Markus Hoelgaard (NOR) | Uno-X Norwegian Development Team | + 24" |
| 3 | Amund Grøndahl Jansen (NOR) | Team Jumbo–Visma | + 32" |
| 4 | Lucas Eriksson (SWE) | Riwal Readynez | + 1' 01" |
| 5 | Benjamin Declercq (BEL) | Sport Vlaanderen–Baloise | + 1' 28" |
| 6 | Brandon McNulty (USA) | Rally UHC Cycling | + 2' 47" |
| 7 | Mathieu van der Poel (NED) | Corendon–Circus | + 3' 46" |
| 8 | Franck Bonnamour (FRA) | Arkéa–Samsic | + 6' 12" |
| 9 | Jordi Warlop (BEL) | Sport Vlaanderen–Baloise | + 7' 08" |
| 10 | Odd Christian Eiking (NOR) | Wanty–Gobert | + 16' 37" |

=== Teams classification ===
Final teams classification (1-10)
| Rank | Team | Time |
|---|---|---|
| 1 | Astana | 45h 02' 14" |
| 2 | Riwal Readynez | + 2' 13" |
| 3 | Total Direct Énergie | + 14' 34" |
| 4 | Sport Vlaanderen–Baloise | + 14' 56" |
| 5 | Team Jumbo–Visma | + 15' 26" |
| 6 | Team Dimension Data | + 22' 46" |
| 7 | Arkéa–Samsic | + 28' 36" |
| 8 | Team Katusha–Alpecin | + 28' 59" |
| 9 | Wanty–Gobert | + 36' 40" |
| 10 | Cofidis | + 38' 08" |
