= Adrian Aas Stien =

Norwegian cyclist

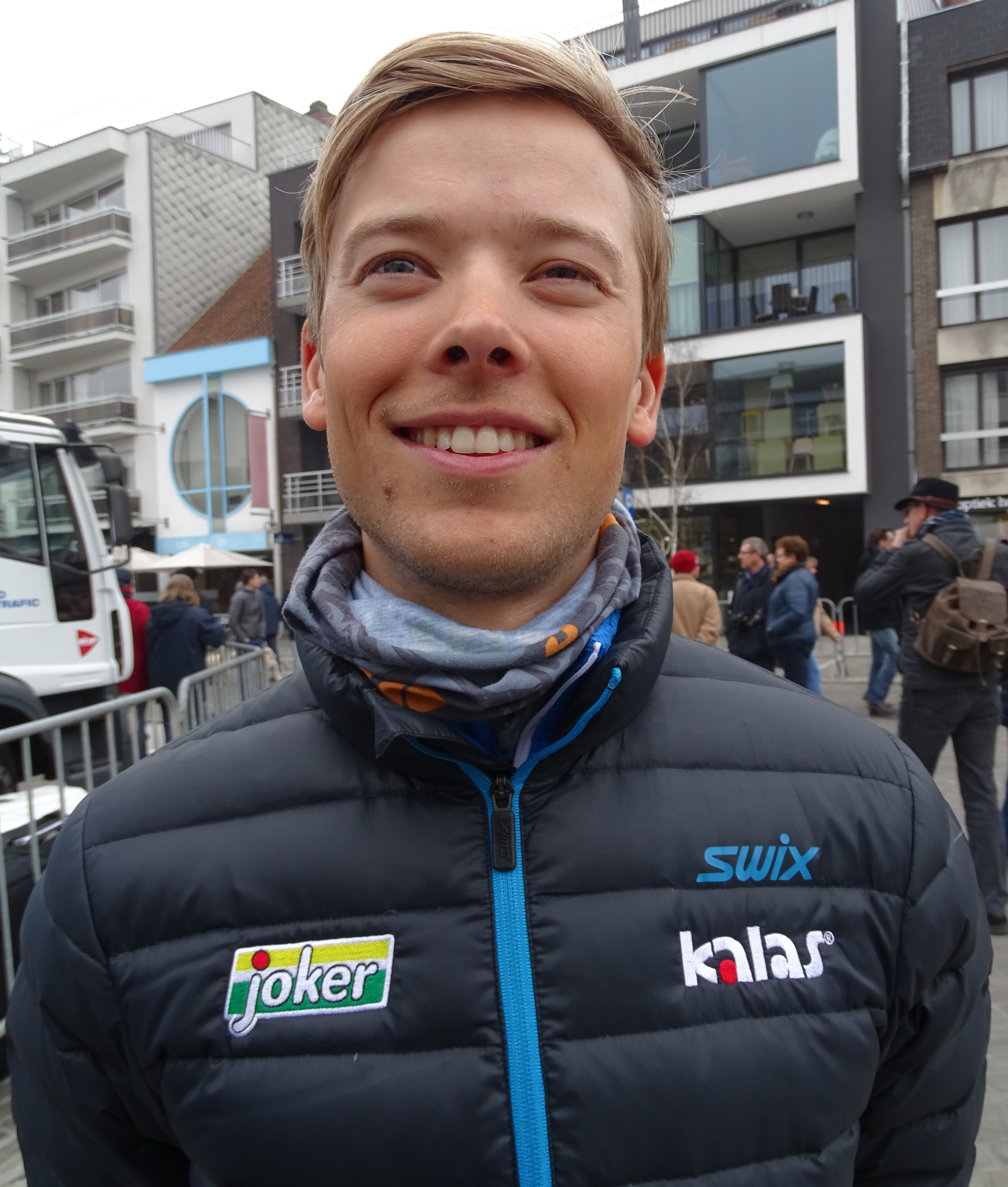
- Stien in 2015

Personal information
- Born: 28 October 1992 (age 33) Norway

Cycling career
- Sport: Cycling
- Current team: Retired
- Discipline: Road
- Role: Rider

Amateur team
- 2014: TVK Sykkel

Professional teams
- 2014: Team Joker (stagiaire)
- 2015–2017: Team Joker

Adrian Aas Stien (born 28 October 1992) is a Norwegian former professional cyclist.

== Major results ==
2015
1st Stage 1 Tour de Bretagne
3rd Kampioenschap van Vlaanderen
10th Ronde van Noord-Holland
2016
Tour de Gironde

1st Points classification
1st Stage 3

6th Overall Ronde de l'Oise
