= Philip Lindau =

Swedish cyclist

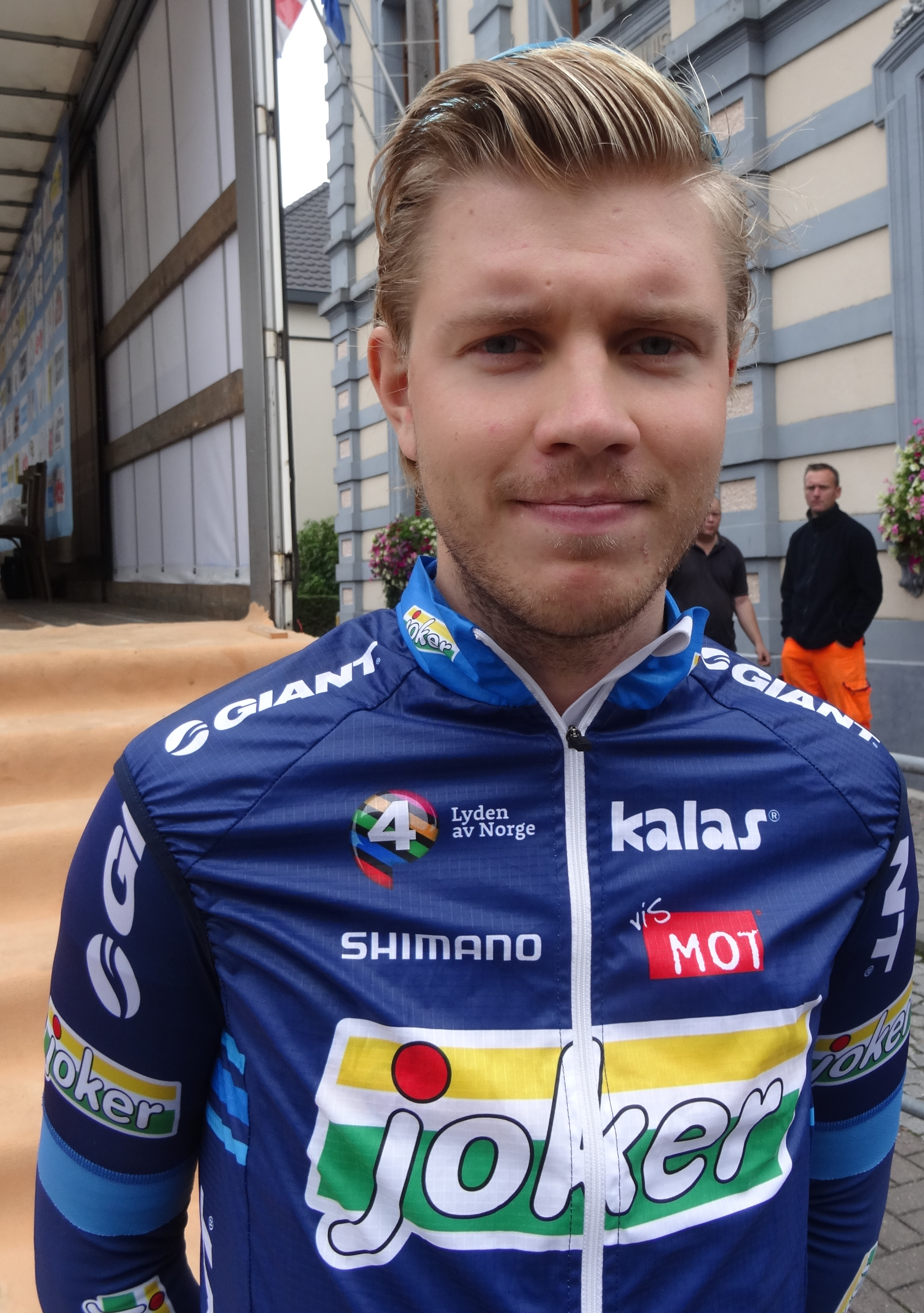
- Lindau in 2014

Personal information
- Full name: Philip Lindau
- Born: 18 August 1991 (age 35) Jönköping, Sweden

Cycling career
- Sport: Cycling
- Current team: Retired
- Discipline: Road
- Role: Rider

Professional teams
- 2011–2012: Team CykelCity.se
- 2013: Team People4you–Unaas Cycling
- 2014–2016: Team Joker
- 2017: Team Coop

Philip Lindau (born 18 August 1991 in Jönköping) is a Swedish former road cyclist.

== Major results ==
2011
1st Road race, National Road Championships
