= Edvin Wilson =

Swedish cyclist

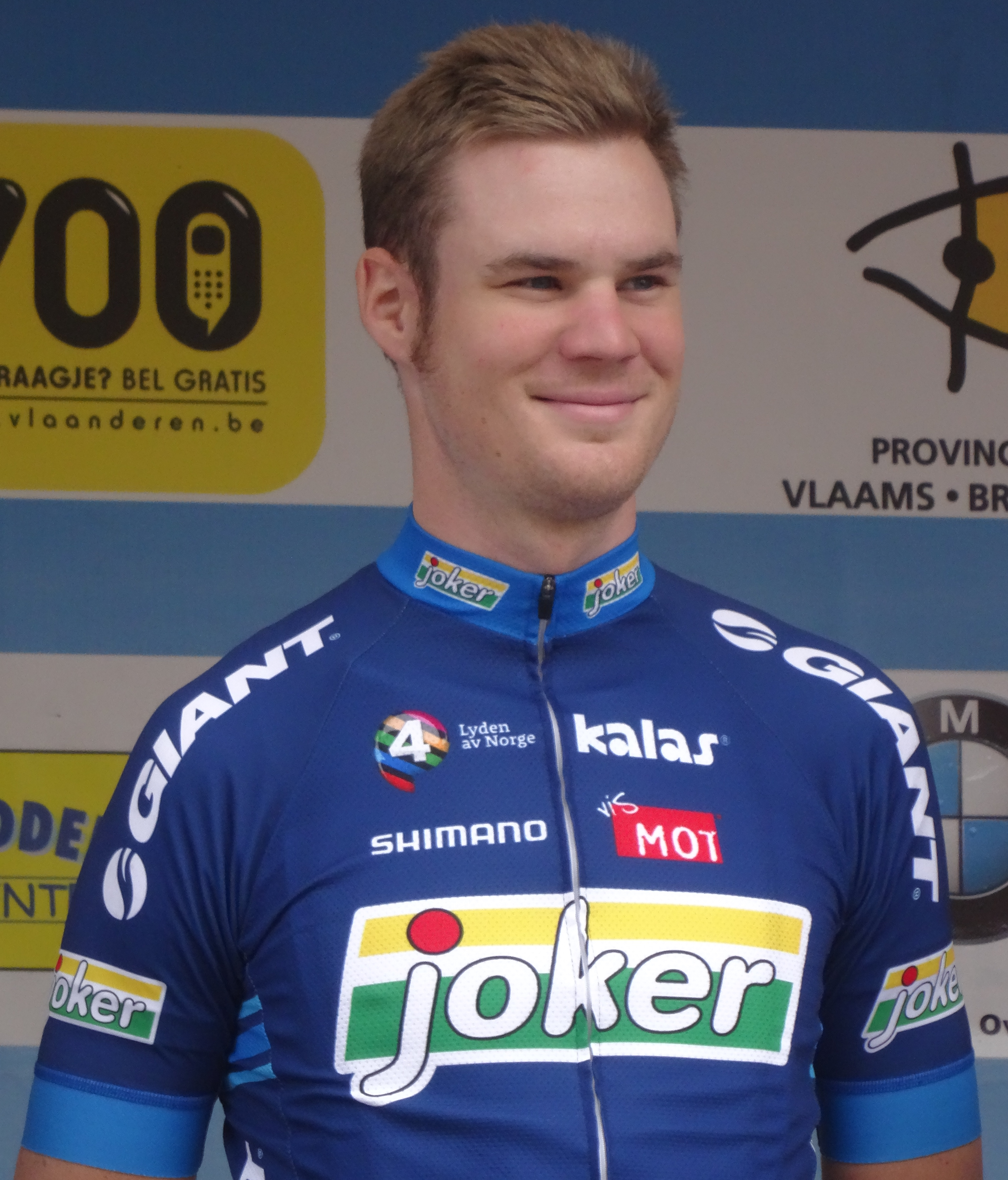
- Wilson in 2014

Personal information
- Born: 25 April 1989 (age 37) Sweden

Cycling career
- Sport: Cycling
- Discipline: Road
- Role: Rider

Amateur team
- 2018: Ryska Posten RT

Professional teams
- 2012: Team CykelCity.se
- 2013–2016: Joker–Merida

Edvin Wilson (born 25 April 1989) is a Swedish cyclist.

== Major results ==
2006
1st Road race, National Junior Road Championships
2012
3rd Scandinavian Race Uppsala
10th Overall Ronde de l'Oise
2013
5th Scandinavian Race Uppsala
2014
1st Arno Wallaard Memorial
2015
7th Dorpenomloop Rucphen
