= Christoffer Lisson =

Danish cyclist (born 1995)

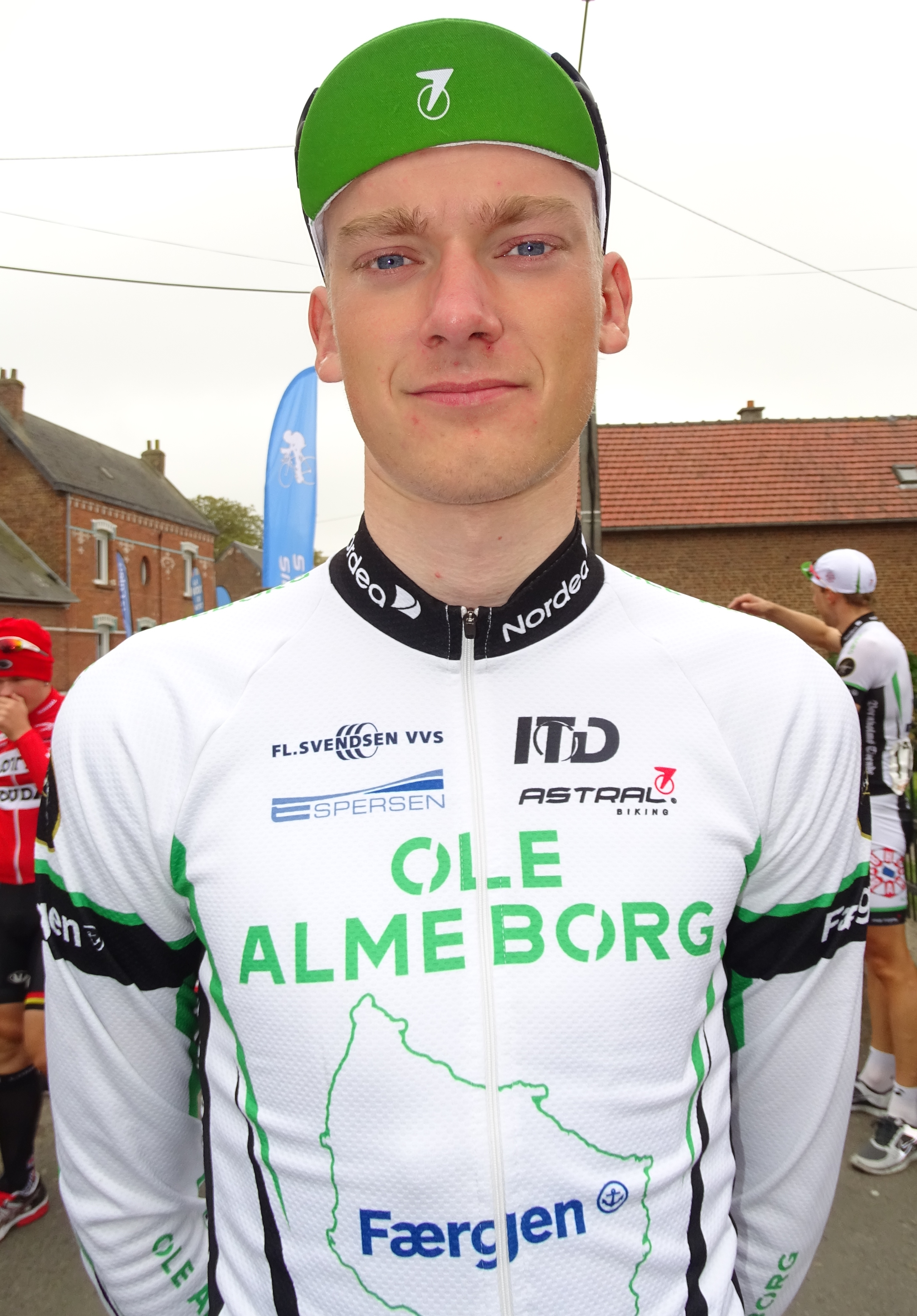
- Lisson in 2015

Personal information
- Born: 28 November 1995 (age 30) Kalundborg, Denmark
- Height: 1.93 m (6 ft 4 in)
- Weight: 73 kg (161 lb)

Cycling career
- Sport: Cycling
- Discipline: Road
- Role: Rider

Professional teams
- 2014: Team Designa Køkken–Knudsgaard
- 2015–2019: Team Almeborg–Bornholm
- 2020–2022: Riwal Readynez

Christoffer Lisson (born 28 November 1995) is a Danish cyclist, who last rode for UCI Continental team Riwal Cycling Team.

== Major results ==
2013
1st Overall GP Général Patton
2nd Overall Tour du Pays de Vaud
3rd Overall Aubel–Thimister–La Gleize
2017
2nd Chrono des Nations U23
6th Memorial Philippe Van Coningsloo
9th Kalmar Grand Prix
2018
3rd Skive–Løbet
8th Overall Paris–Arras Tour
8th Ringerike GP
2019
3rd Skive–Løbet
5th Road race, National Road Championships
5th Duo Normand
5th Chrono Champenois
9th Overall Tour of Denmark
9th Kalmar Grand Prix
