= Daniel Hoelgaard =

Norwegian cyclist

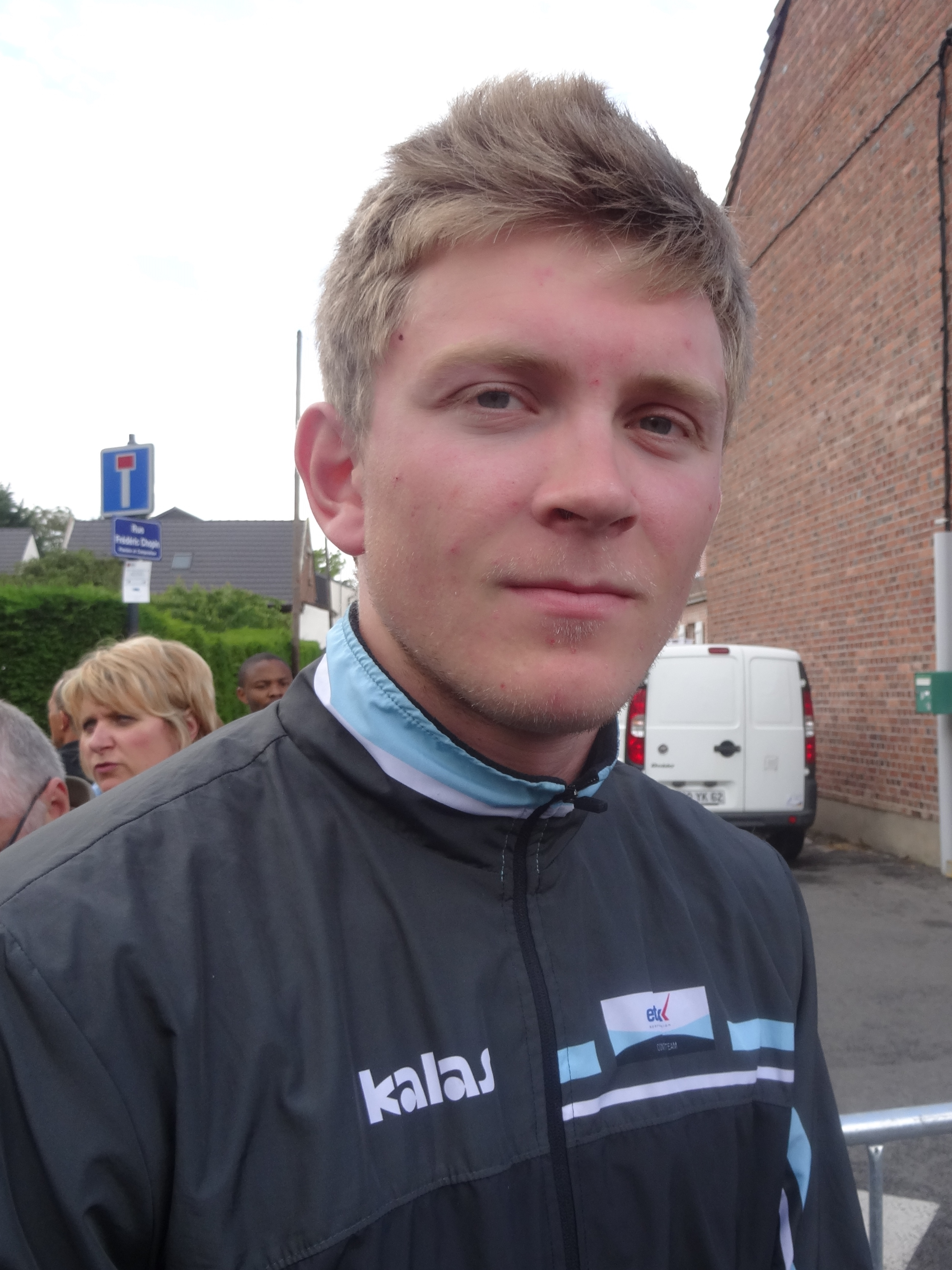
- Hoelgaard in 2014.

Personal information
- Full name: Daniel Hoelgaard
- Born: 1 July 1993 (age 33) Stavanger, Norway
- Height: 1.83 m (6 ft 0 in)
- Weight: 77 kg (170 lb)

Cycling career
- Sport: Cycling
- Current team: Retired
- Discipline: Road
- Role: Rider
- Rider type: Sprinter

Professional teams
- 2012: Team Øster Hus–Ridley
- 2013–2014: Etixx–IHNed
- 2015: Team Joker
- 2016–2019: FDJ
- 2020–2021: Uno-X Norwegian Development Team

Daniel Hoelgaard (born 1 July 1993) is a Norwegian former cyclist, who competed as a professional from 2012 to 2021. He competed in one Grand Tour: the 2017 Vuelta a España. Hoelgaard retired from competition at the end of the 2021 season. He is the brother of fellow racing cyclist Markus Hoelgaard.

== Major results ==
2010
1st Road race, National Junior Road Championships
9th GP Herning
2011
1st Stage 2 Regio-Tour Junioren
2nd Road race, National Junior Road Championships
7th Road race, UCI Junior Road World Championships
2012
1st Kernen Omloop Echt-Susteren
2014
Tour de Bretagne

1st Points classification
1st Stage 5

Okolo Jižních Čech

1st Points classification
1st Stages 1 & 4

4th Overall Ronde de l'Oise

1st Stage 2

5th Puchar Ministra Obrony Narodowej
10th De Kustpijl
2015
2nd Velothon Stockholm
3rd Overall Tour de Bretagne

1st Points classification
1st Stage 5

3rd La Côte Picarde
4th Overall Tour de Normandie

1st Stage 3

6th Kernen Omloop Echt-Susteren
2016
1st Stage 1 (TTT) La Méditerranéenne
7th Bretagne Classic
2017
7th Tour de Vendée
2018
2nd Classic Loire-Atlantique
6th Cholet-Pays de Loire

=== Grand Tour general classification results timeline ===
Grand Tour	2017
Giro d'Italia	—
Tour de France	—
Vuelta a España	125

Legend
—	Did not compete
DNF	Did not finish
