= Vegard Stake Laengen =

Norwegian racing cyclist

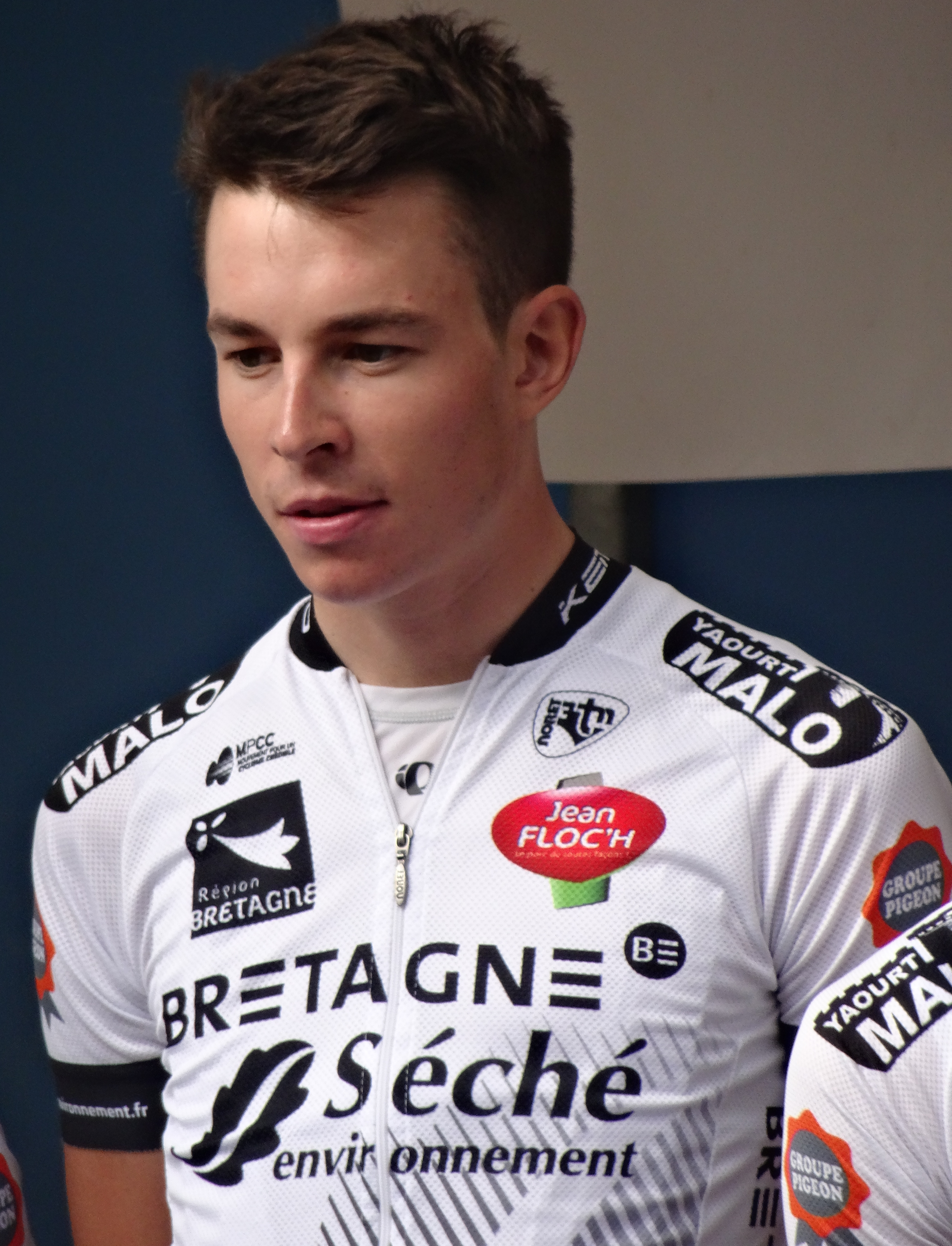
- Laengen at the 2014 Tour de l'Eurométropole

Personal information
- Full name: Vegard Stake Laengen
- Born: 7 February 1989 (age 37) Oslo, Norway
- Height: 1.95 m (6 ft 5 in)
- Weight: 79 kg (174 lb; 12 st 6 lb)

Cycling career
- Sport: Cycling
- Current team: UAE Team Emirates XRG
- Discipline: Road
- Role: Rider
- Rider type: Classics specialist; Time-trialist

Amateur team
- 2008: Team Trek Adecco

Professional teams
- 2009–2011: Joker–Bianchi
- 2012: Team Type 1–Sanofi
- 2013–2014: Bretagne–Séché Environnement
- 2015: Team Joker
- 2016: IAM Cycling
- 2017–: UAE Abu Dhabi

Major wins
- One-day races and Classics National Road Race Championships (2018)
Medal record
Representing Norway
Men's road bicycle racing
European Road Championships
Bronze medal – third place	2011 Offida	Under-23 time trial

Vegard Stake Laengen (born 7 February 1989) is a Norwegian professional road racing cyclist, who currently rides for UCI WorldTeam UAE Team Emirates XRG.

== Career ==
Born in Oslo, Laengen competed for Norway at the 2012 and 2016 Olympics. In August 2015 Team Joker confirmed that Laengen would be leaving the team to join IAM Cycling for 2016. He has competed in ten Grand Tours in his career. In 2018, he was crowned the Norwegian national road race champion.

== Personal life ==
Laengen currently resides in Fredrikstad, Norway.

== Major results ==
2009
10th Rogaland GP
2010
1st Overall Giro della Regione Friuli Venezia Giulia
4th Road race, National Road Championships
9th Overall Tour Alsace
2011
National Road Championships

2nd Road race
4th Time trial

3rd Time trial, UEC European Under-23 Road Championships
3rd Overall Le Triptyque des Monts et Châteaux
4th Overall Tour de l'Avenir
5th Overall Tour Alsace
7th Ronde van Vlaanderen Beloften
2012
1st Stage 5 Tour de Beauce
5th Road race, National Road Championships
2013
2nd Overall Kreiz Breizh Elites
3rd Tour du Doubs
2014
9th Boucles de l'Aulne
2015
1st Overall Tour Alsace

1st Stage 3

2nd Overall Ronde de l'Oise

1st Stage 3

2nd Chrono Champenois
National Road Championships

3rd Road race
4th Time trial

3rd Hadeland GP
4th Ringerike GP
2016
2nd Time trial, National Road Championships
2017
6th Overall Tour of California
8th Gran Premio di Lugano
9th Overall Colorado Classic
Combativity award Stage 6 Tour de France
2018 (1 pro win)
1st Road race, National Road Championships
10th Overall Tour of Slovenia
2021
2nd Trofeo Andratx–Mirador d'Es Colomer

=== Grand Tour general classification results timeline ===
Grand Tour	2016	2017	2018	2019	2020	2021	2022	2023	2024
Giro d'Italia	83	—	102	—	—	—	—	—	75
Tour de France	—	127	—	107	82	112	DNF	102	
Vuelta a España	81	—	107	—	—	—	—		

Legend
—	Did not compete
DNF	Did not finish
