= Christina Jewelry–Kuma =

Team information
- UCI code: CPH
- Registered: Denmark
- Founded: 2015
- Discipline: Road
- Status: UCI Continental
- Bicycles: BMC
- Website: Team home page

Key personnel
- Team managers: Philip Nielsen; Sune Ryssel; Christian Brandt Pedersen; Oliver Sachmann Hansen

Team name history
- 2015 2016 2017 2017–: Team Soigneur–FBL (Amateur); Team Soigneur–Copenhagen Pro Cycling; Copenhagen Pro Cycling; Christina Jewelry–Kuma

Christina Jewelry–Kuma is a UCI Continental team founded in 2015 and based in Denmark. From 2016 they participate in UCI Continental Circuits races.

== Team roster ==
Rider	Date of birth
Filip Bengtsson (SWE)	17 September 1995 (age 30)
Mads Corell (DEN)	4 October 1995 (age 30)
Daniel Crista (ROU)	19 January 1991 (age 35)
Morten Gadgaard (DEN)	24 September 1996 (age 29)
Morten Höberg (DNK)	8 March 1988 (age 38)

Rider	Date of birth
Maximilian Hoffmann (DNK)	26 February 1997 (age 29)
Christian Ingemann Lindquist (DNK)	5 August 1997 (age 29)
Fredrik Ludvigsson (SWE)	28 April 1994 (age 32)
Mathias Lindberg Mortensen (DEN)	21 November 1992 (age 33)
Jonas Nordkroggaard (DNK)	3 June 1994 (age 32)
Frederik Wilmann (NOR)	17 July 1985 (age 41)
