= Reidar Borgersen =

Norwegian cyclist

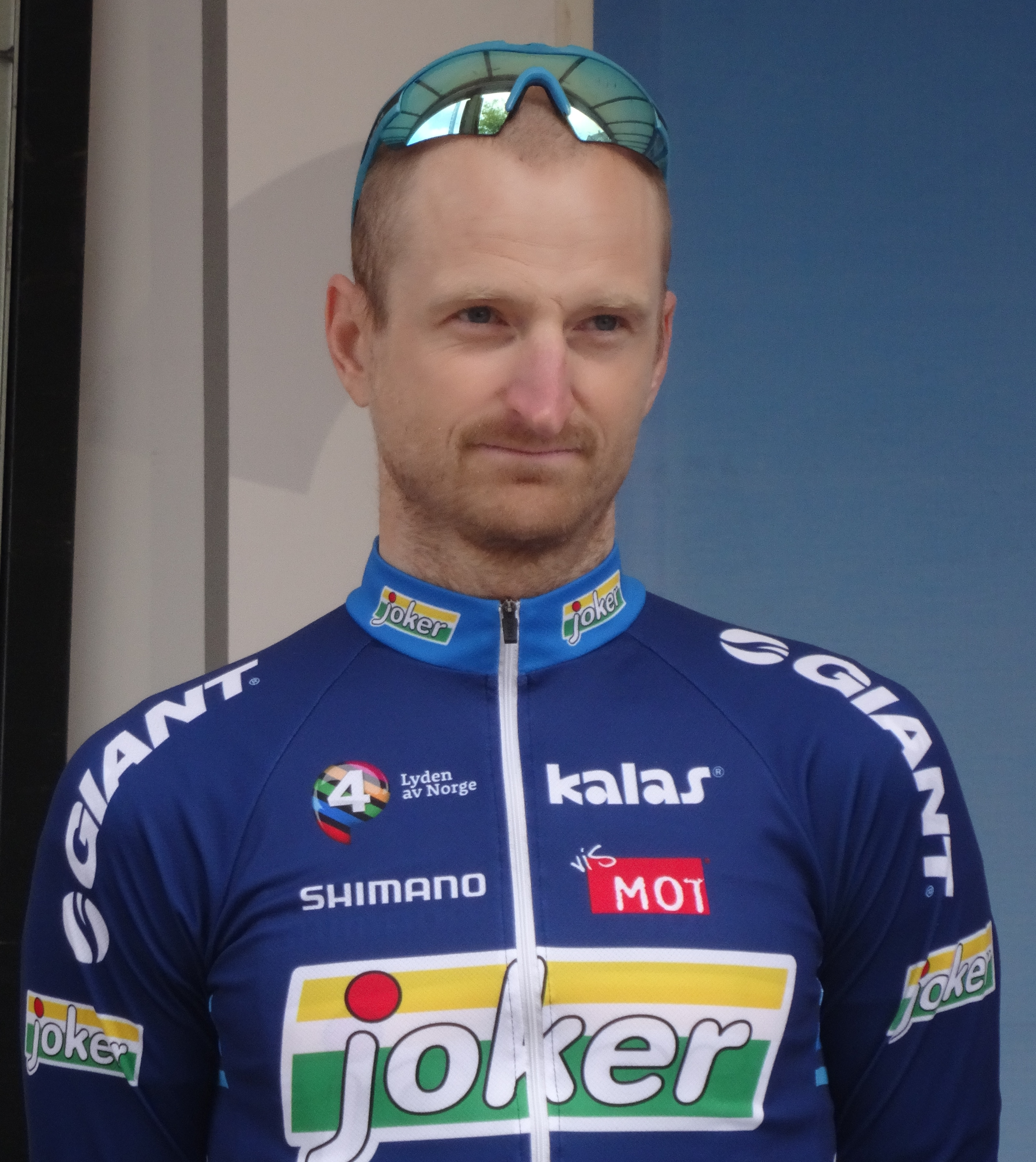
- Borgersen in 2014

Personal information
- Full name: Reidar Bohlin Borgersen
- Born: 10 April 1980 (age 46) Krokstadelva, Norway
- Weight: 82 kg (181 lb)

Cycling career
- Sport: Cycling
- Current team: Retired
- Discipline: Road
- Role: Rider
- Rider type: Rouleur; Time trialist

Professional team
- 2010–2016: Joker–Bianchi

Major wins
- Norwegian National Time Trial Championships (2012, 2014)

Reidar Bohlin Borgersen (born 10 April 1980) is a Norwegian former racing cyclist, and speed skater. He rode at the 2014 UCI Road World Championships, and was the 2012 and 2014 winner of the Norwegian National Time Trial Championships.

== Major results ==
2010
2nd Time trial, National Road Championships
2011
2nd Time trial, National Road Championships
2012
1st Time trial, National Road Championships
1st Mountains classification Ronde de l'Oise
2013
1st Ringerike GP
3rd Time trial, National Road Championships
4th Overall Boucles de la Mayenne
7th Destination Thy
2014
1st Time trial, National Road Championships
1st Overall Okolo Jižních Čech

1st Stage 2 (ITT)

1st Duo Normand (with Truls Korsæth)
2nd Chrono Champenois
3rd Overall Tour de Normandie
3rd Chrono des Nations
8th Overall Ronde de l'Oise
2015
6th Chrono des Nations
10th Gooikse Pijl
2016
2nd Chrono Champenois
3rd Overall Circuit des Ardennes
4th Time trial, National Road Championships
4th Grand Prix de la Ville de Lillers
4th Ringerike GP
6th Duo Normand (with Truls Korsæth)
9th Chrono des Nations
