= Fridtjof Røinås =

Norwegian cyclist

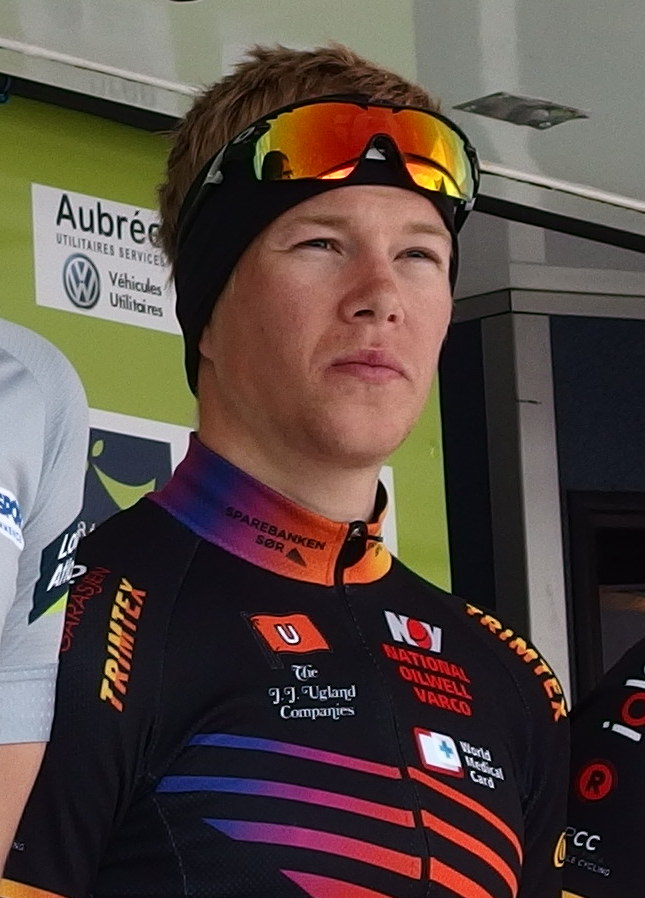
- Røinås in 2014

Personal information
- Full name: Fridtjof Rasin Røinås
- Born: 2 August 1994 (age 32) Grimstad Municipality, Norway

Cycling career
- Sport: Cycling
- Current team: Retired
- Discipline: Road
- Role: Rider

Amateur team
- 2012: Grimstad SK

Professional teams
- 2013–2017: Team Plussbank
- 2018–2020: Joker Icopal

Fridtjof Rasin Røinås (born 2 August 1994) is a Norwegian former racing cyclist. He competed in the men's team time trial event at the 2017 UCI Road World Championships.

== Major results ==
2012
1st Road race, National Junior Road Championships
2013
4th Himmerland Rundt
2015
1st Stage 3 East Bohemia Tour
2016
5th Overall Tour du Loir-et-Cher

1st Stage 3

2017
10th Overall Baltic Chain Tour
2018
10th Omloop van het Houtland
2019
1st Mountains classification, Danmark Rundt
8th Himmerland Rundt
2020
4th International Rhodes Grand Prix
5th Overall International Tour of Rhodes
