= Ole Haavardsholm =

Norwegian cyclist

Personal information
- Born: 18 July 1989 (age 37) Stavanger, Norway

Cycling career
- Sport: Cycling
- Current team: Retired
- Discipline: Road
- Role: Rider
- Rider type: Time Trialist

Professional team
- 2008–2010: Joker Bianchi

Ole Haavardsholm (born 18 July 1989, in Stavanger) is a former Norwegian cyclist.

== Palmares ==
2006
1st Junior National Time Trial Championships
2007
1st Junior National Time Trial Championships
1st Stage 1 Sint-Martinusprijs Kontich
2nd Grand Prix Général Patton

1st Stage 2

3rd Junior European Road Race Championships
3rd Keizer der Juniores
2009
1st Poreč Trophy
