= Ole Forfang =

Norwegian cyclist

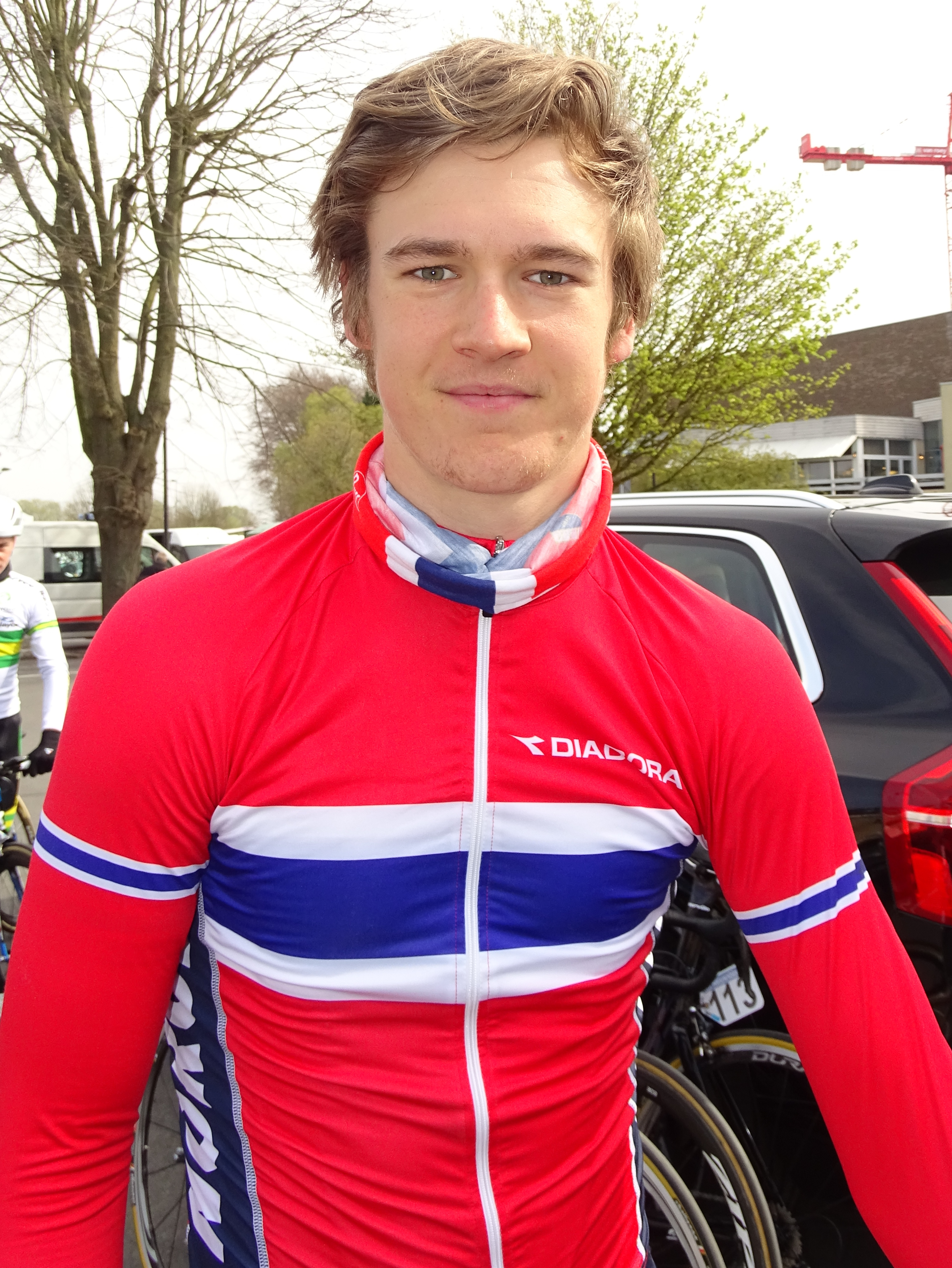
- Ole Forfang in 2016

Personal information
- Born: 22 March 1995 (age 31) Oslo, Norway

Cycling career
- Sport: Cycling
- Current team: Retired
- Discipline: Road
- Role: Rider

Amateur team
- 2014: Lillehammer CK

Professional teams
- 2015: Team Ringeriks–Kraft
- 2016–2019: Team Joker

Ole Forfang (born 22 March 1995) is a Norwegian former racing cyclist. He competed in the men's team time trial event at the 2017 UCI Road World Championships.

== Major results ==
2016
1st Stage 1 (TTT) ZLM Roompot Tour
2017
6th De Kustpijl
8th Kattekoers
2019
1st Overall Tour de Normandie

1st Young rider classification
1st Stage 4

6th Volta Limburg Classic
