= Vegard Breen =

Norwegian cyclist

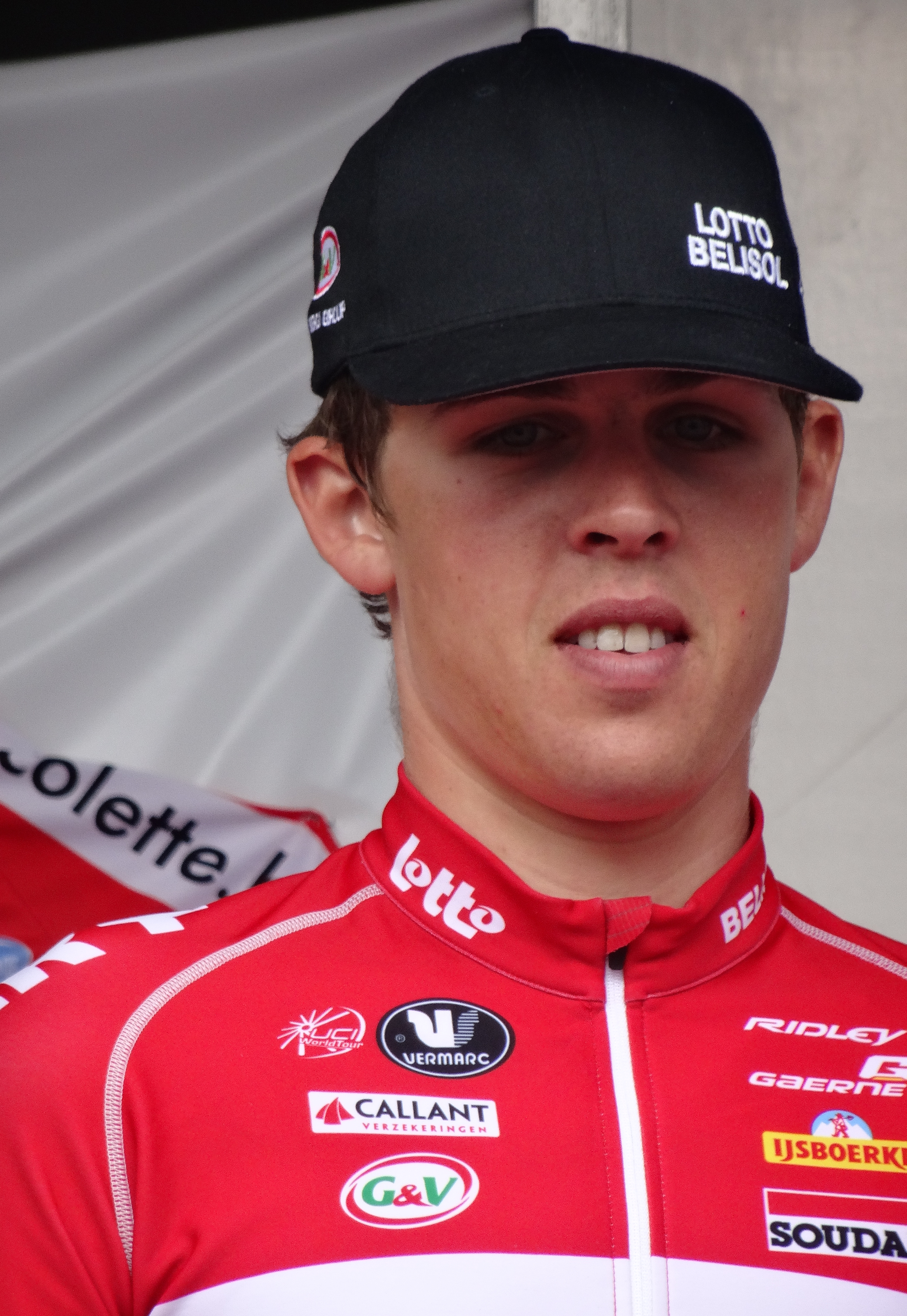
- Breen in 2014

Personal information
- Full name: Vegard Breen
- Born: 8 February 1990 (age 36) Norway
- Height: 1.87 m (6 ft 2 in)
- Weight: 74 kg (163 lb; 11.7 st)

Cycling career
- Sport: Cycling
- Current team: Retired
- Discipline: Road
- Role: Rider

Professional teams
- 2010–2013: Joker–Bianchi
- 2014–2015: Lotto–Belisol
- 2016: Fortuneo–Vital Concept
- 2017: Joker Icopal

Vegard Breen (born 8 February 1990) is a Norwegian former professional cyclist, who rode professionally between 2010 and 2017. He was named in the start list for the 2016 Tour de France.

== Major results ==
2008
1st Time trial, National Junior Road Championships
2nd Time trial, UEC European Road Championships
2nd Overall Trofeo Karlsberg
9th Time trial, UCI Juniors World Championships
2012
1st La Côte Picarde
4th Overall Tour de Bretagne
2013
1st Overall Ronde de l'Oise

1st Points classification

3rd Overall Tour du Loir-et-Cher
7th Overall Circuit des Ardennes

1st Stage 3 (TTT)

8th Overall Tour de Bretagne
2014
9th Dwars door Drenthe

=== Grand Tour general classification results timeline ===
Grand Tour	2014	2015	2016
Giro d'Italia	—	—	—
Tour de France	—	—	167
Vuelta a España	129	—	—

Legend
—	Did not compete
DNF	Did not finish
