= Frederik Wilmann =

Norwegian cyclist

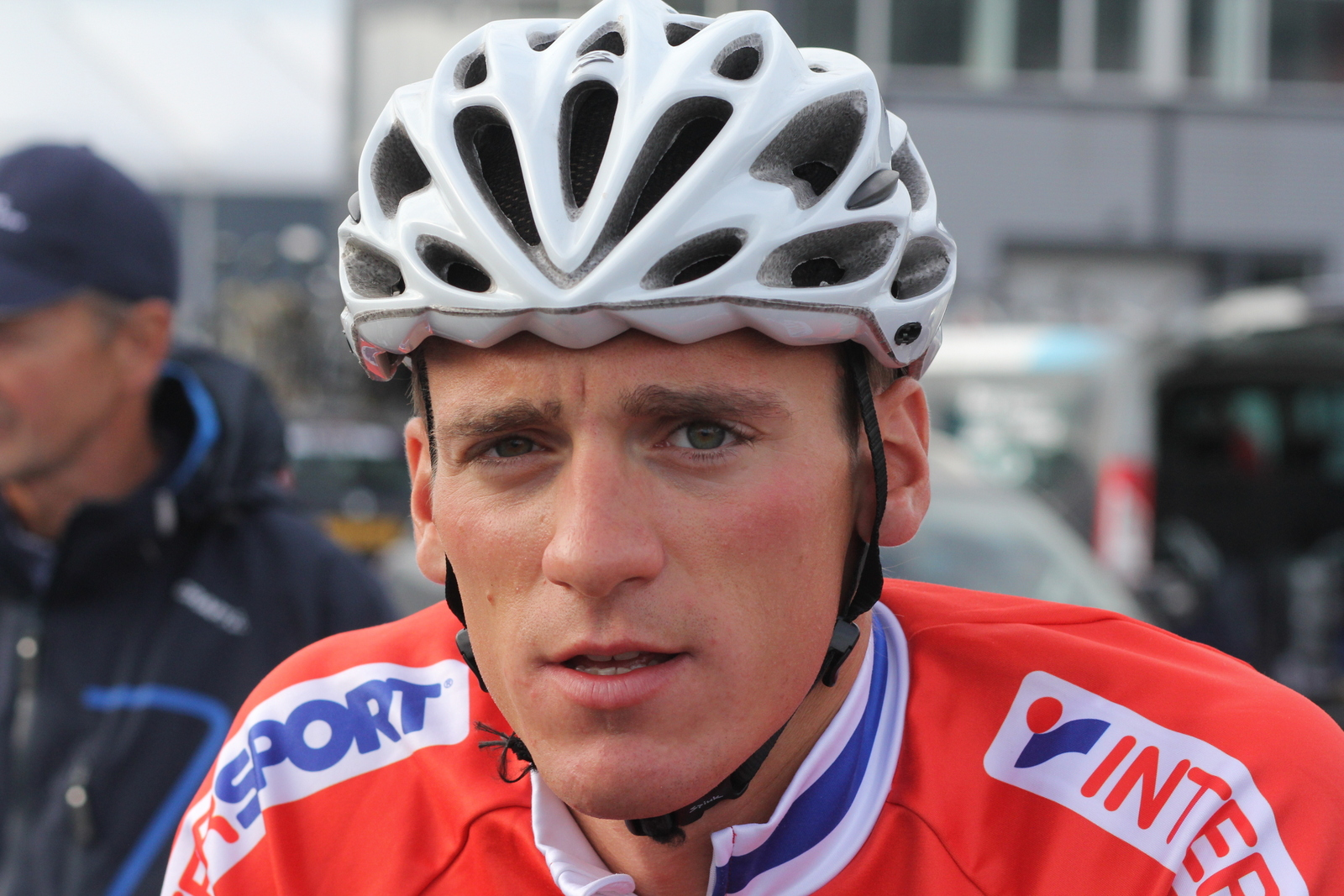

Personal information
- Full name: Frederik Wilmann
- Born: 17 July 1985 (age 41) Viggja, Norway

Cycling career
- Sport: Cycling
- Current team: Retired
- Discipline: Road
- Role: Rider
- Rider type: Climber

Amateur teams
- 2004: Vestfold SK Mix
- 2018: IK Hero

Professional teams
- 2005–2009: Maxbo–Bianchi
- 2010: Skil–Shimano
- 2011: Joker–Merida
- 2012–2013: Christina Watches–Onfone
- 2014–2015: Team Ringeriks–Kraft
- 2016: Team ColoQuick–Cult
- 2017: Copenhagen Pro Cycling

Major wins
- National Under-23 Road Race Championships (2007); Mi-Août Bretonne (2009)

Frederik Wilmann (born 17 July 1985 in Viggja) is a Norwegian former professional road bicycle racer, who rode professionally between 2005 and 2017. He is the son of Norwegian cyclist Jostein Wilmann.

== Career ==
In 2007, Wilmann finished third in the Norwegian National Road Race Championships, behind Alexander Kristoff and Thor Hushovd. But he became the under-23 road race champion, after beating Stian Sommerseth, Edvald Boasson Hagen and Kristoff.

After riding for several years in the Norwegian outfit, Joker–Bianchi, Wilmann signed a two-year contract with the Dutch team Skil–Shimano in 2010. He broke off the contract in late 2010 due to dissatisfaction, and then returned to his former team, Joker–Merida. After only one year "back home", he signed for the Danish team Christina Watches–Onfone in late 2011, riding together with experienced riders like Michael Rasmussen and Stefan Schumacher. In 2014 and 2015, Wilmann rode for Team Ringeriks–Kraft.

== Major results ==
2003
3rd Road race, National Junior Road Championships
2005
1st Overall Grenland GP

1st Stage 1

2007
1st Road race, National Under-23 Road Championships
1st Gjøvik GP
1st Stage 1 Trøndelag GP
3rd Road race, National Road Championships
9th Overall Tour de l'Avenir
9th Rund um die Hainleite
2008
1st Stage 7 Tour de Bretagne
2nd Sandefjord GP
5th Time trial, National Under-23 Road Championships
2009
1st Overall Mi-Août Bretonne
3rd Time trial, National Road Championships
3rd Overall Tour Alsace

1st Stage 1

6th Overall Paris–Corrèze
7th Overall Istrian Spring Trophy
7th Overall Ringerike GP
10th Overall Le Triptyque des Monts et Châteaux
2011
1st Rogaland GP
5th Overall Tour of Norway
7th Overall Cinturón a Mallorca
2015
5th Overall Volta Ciclística Internacional do Rio Grande do Sul
10th Hadeland GP
2016
6th Sundvolden GP
9th Overall Tour of China I
