= Truls Korsæth =

Norwegian cyclist

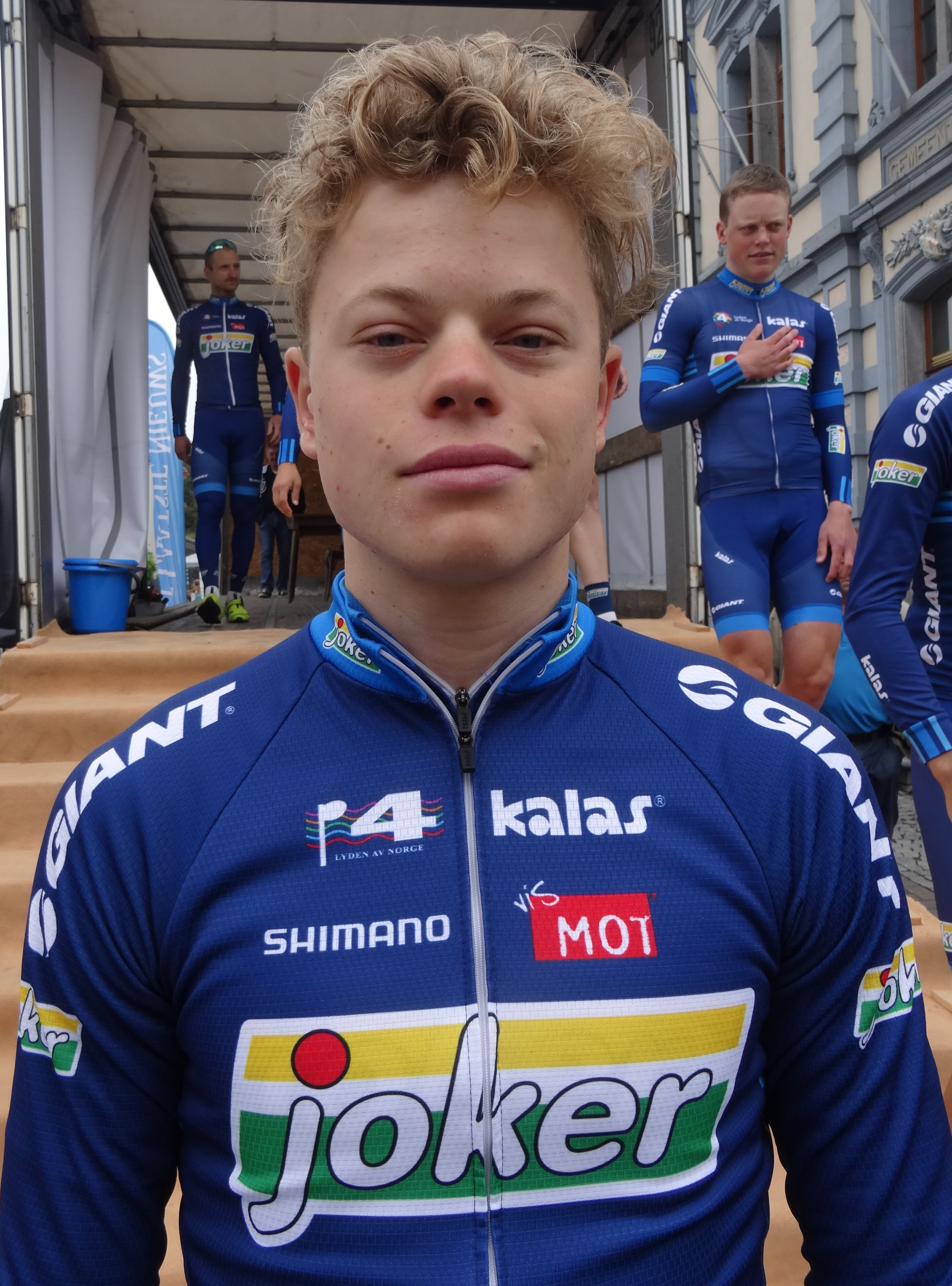
- Korsæth in 2014.

Personal information
- Full name: Truls Engen Korsæth
- Born: 16 September 1993 (age 33) Norway
- Height: 1.86 m (6 ft 1 in)
- Weight: 84 kg (185 lb)

Cycling career
- Sport: Cycling
- Discipline: Road
- Role: Rider

Amateur teams
- 2012: Lillehammer CK
- 2013–2016: Joker–Merida

Professional team
- 2017–2018: Astana

Truls Engen Korsæth (born 16 September 1993) is a Norwegian former cyclist, who competed for the Lillehammer CK, Team Joker Byggtorget and Astana teams between 2012 and 2018. He turned professional with Astana in 2017 after four years riding for Joker–Merida. During the 2018 season he suffered from illness, with his last race of the year being the Tour de Yorkshire in May, and in September 2018 he announced his retirement from competition.

== Major results ==
2011
2nd Time trial, National Junior Road Championships
2012
1st Time trial, National Under-23 Road Championships
2013
1st Time trial, National Under-23 Road Championships
1st Stage 3 (TTT) Circuit des Ardennes
2014
1st Duo Normand (with Reidar Borgersen)
2015
National Road Championships

1st Under-23 time trial
2nd Under-23 road race
3rd Time trial

2nd Ronde van Noord-Holland
3rd Ronde van Vlaanderen Beloften
4th Time trial, UCI Under-23 Road World Championships
9th Overall ZLM Tour
2016
1st Stage 1 Tour de Gironde
6th Duo Normand (with Reidar Borgersen)
8th Chrono des Nations
9th Chrono Champenois
