= Christer Rake =

Norwegian cyclist

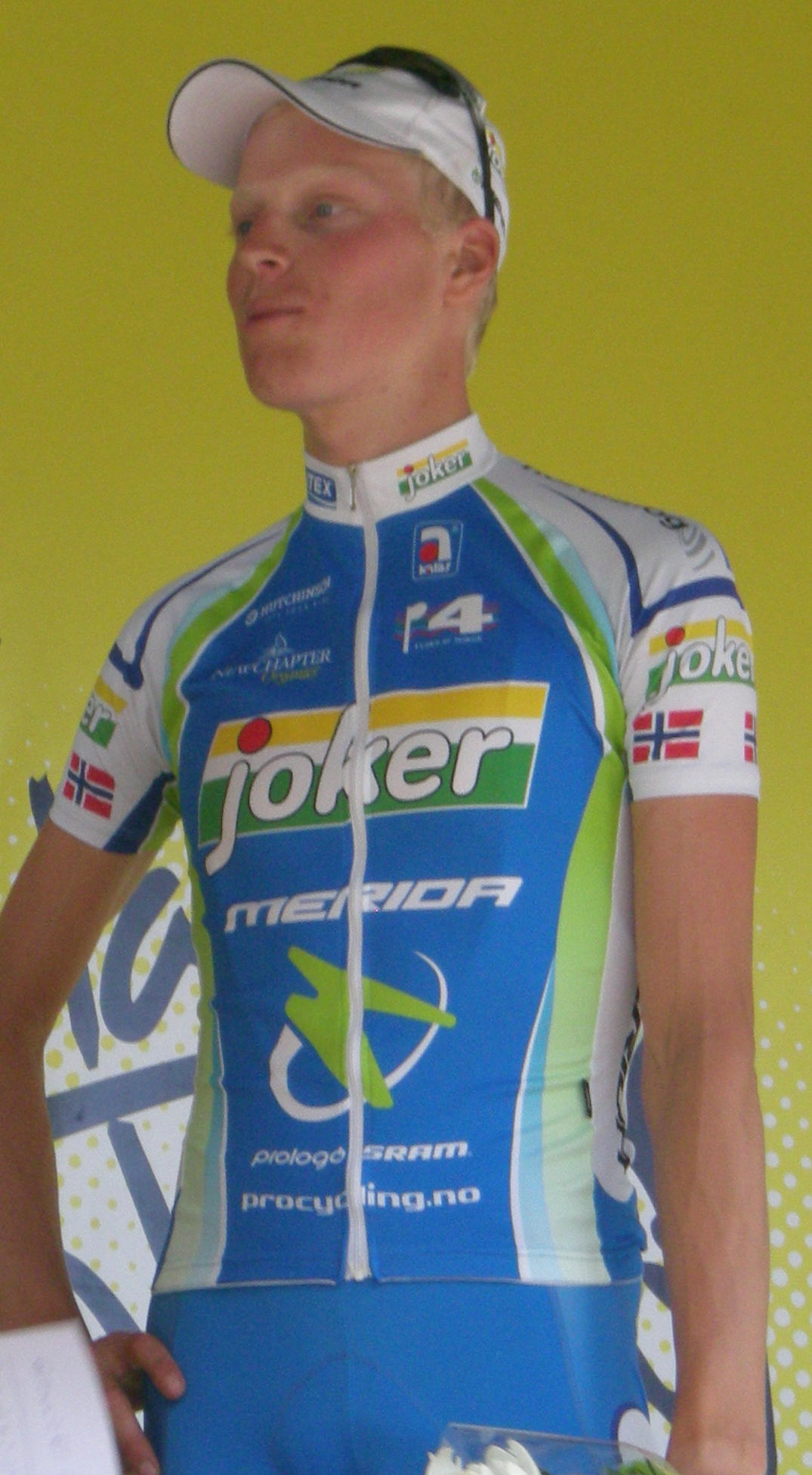
- Rake in 2011

Personal information
- Full name: Christer Rake
- Born: 19 March 1987 (age 39) Stavanger, Norway

Cycling career
- Sport: Cycling
- Current team: Retired
- Discipline: Road
- Role: Rider

Professional teams
- 2006: Glud & Marstrand–Horsens
- 2007–2009: Team Sparebanken Vest
- 2010–2012: Joker–Bianchi

Christer Rake (born 19 March 1987 in Stavanger) is a Norwegian former professional road racing cyclist.

== Major results ==
2009
4th Road race, National Road Championships
5th Arno Wallaard Memorial
6th Overall Ringerike GP
10th Prague–Karlovy Vary–Prague
2010
1st Overall Ringerike GP

1st Stage 4

National Road Championships

2nd Road race
4th Time trial

4th Overall Tour of China
2011
7th Overall Tour of Norway

1st Stage 5

7th Overall Tour of China
2012
2nd Overall Mi-Août Bretonne
