= Henrik Evensen =

Norwegian cyclist

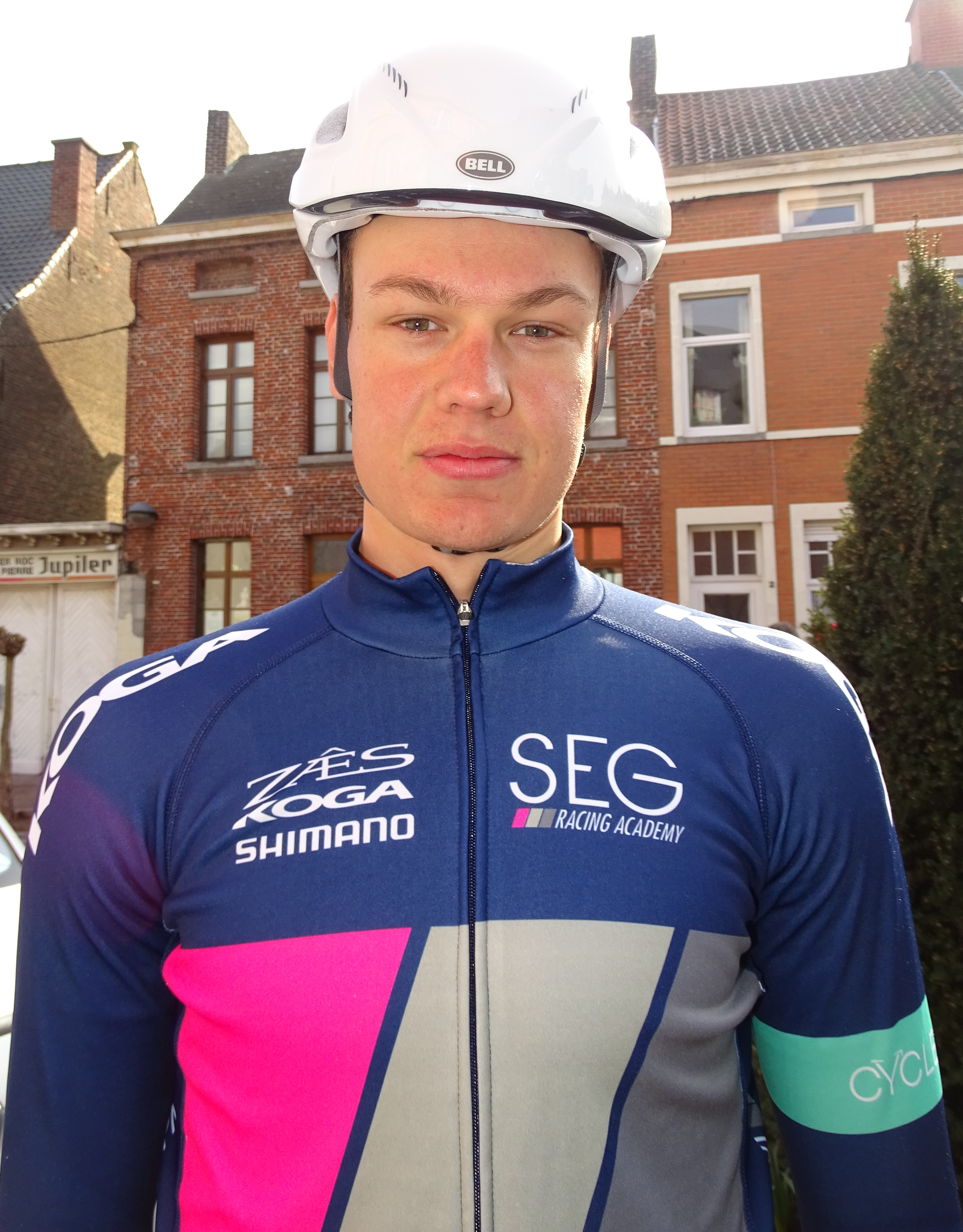
- Evensen in 2016

Personal information
- Full name: Henrik Evensen
- Born: 17 November 1994 (age 31) Maura, Norway

Cycling career
- Sport: Cycling
- Discipline: Road
- Role: Rider

Professional teams
- 2013–2015: Team Frøy–Bianchi
- 2016–2017: SEG Racing Academy
- 2018–2019: Joker Icopal

Henrik Evensen (born 17 November 1994) is a Norwegian cyclist, who last rode for UCI Continental team Joker Fuel of Norway.

== Major results ==
2016
7th Slag om Norg
9th Paris–Roubaix Espoirs
2017
9th Grote Prijs Marcel Kint
2018
1st Overall Ronde de l'Oise

1st Points classification
1st Stages 1 & 4
