= Amund Grøndahl Jansen =

Norwegian cyclist

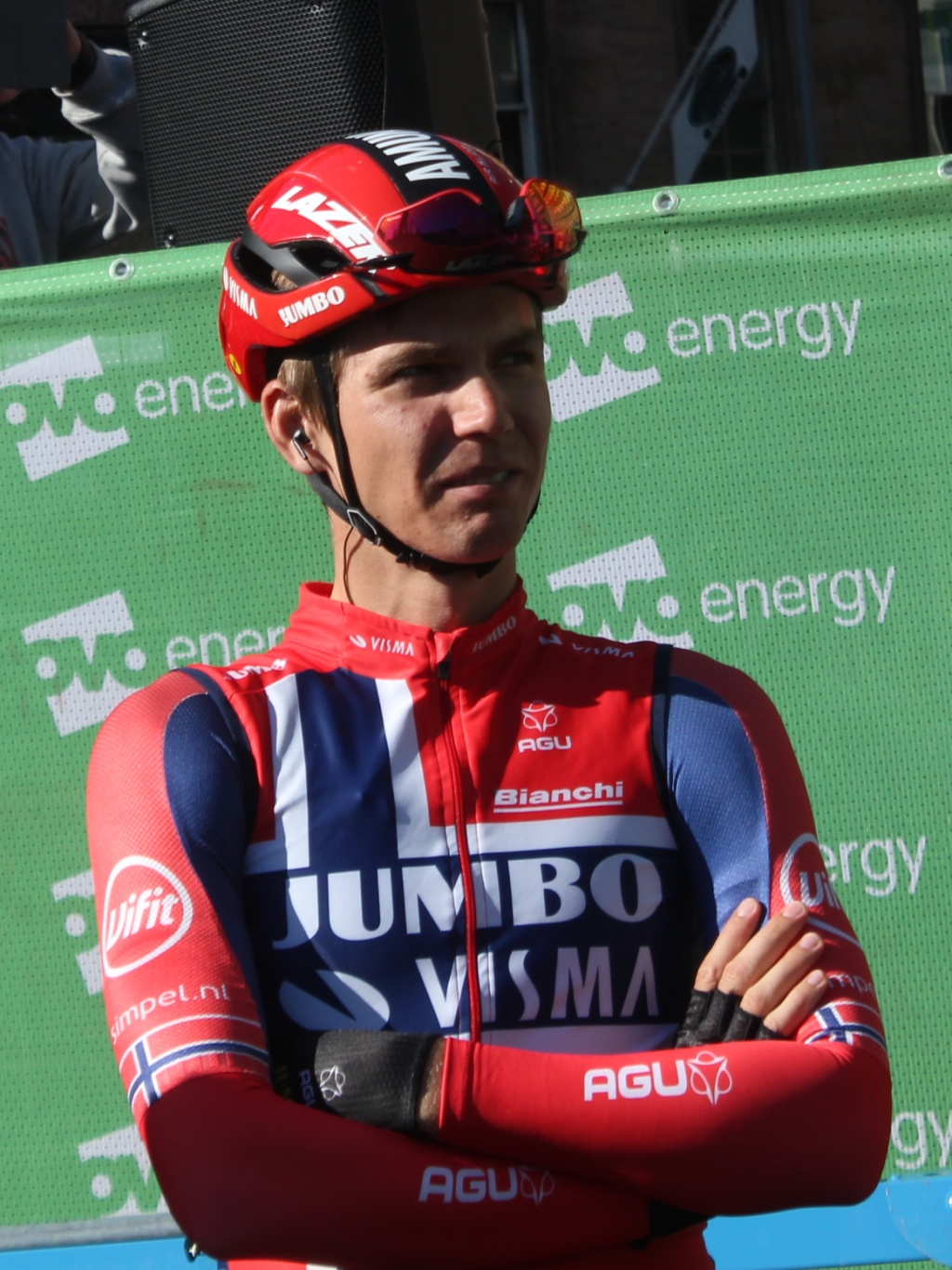
- Grøndahl Jansen at the 2019 Tour of Britain

Personal information
- Full name: Amund Grøndahl Jansen
- Born: 11 February 1994 (age 32) Nes, Akershus
- Height: 1.87 m (6 ft 1 1/2 in)
- Weight: 83 kg (183 lb; 13 st 1 lb)

Cycling career
- Sport: Cycling
- Current team: Uno-X Mobility
- Discipline: Road
- Role: Rider

Professional teams
- 2013–2014: Team Plussbank
- 2015–2016: Team Joker
- 2017–2020: LottoNL–Jumbo
- 2021–2024: Team BikeExchange
- 2025: Uno-X Mobility

Major wins
- Grand Tours Tour de France 1 TTT stage (2019) One-day races and Classics National Road Race Championships (2019)

Amund Grøndahl Jansen (born 11 February 1994) is a Norwegian former professional cyclist, who competed from 2013 to 2025 and last rode for UCI ProTeam Uno-X Mobility. He won the Norwegian National Road Race Championships in 2019.

== Career ==
In July 2018, he was named in the start list for the 2018 Tour de France.

In June 2019, Grøndahl Jansen won his first professional stage win at Stage 3 of the 2019 ZLM Tour, attacking from a reduced group with one kilometre from the finish. Later that month, he became Norwegian road champion, winning in a sprint of three riders.

In September 2020, Grøndahl Jansen signed a two-year contract with Mitchelton–Scott, later renamed as Team BikeExchange, from the 2021 season.

== Major results ==
2011
1st Stage 4 Internationale Niedersachsen-Rundfahrt
2012
2nd Time trial, National Junior Road Championships
UEC European Junior Road Championships

4th Time trial
10th Road race

2014
1st Mountains classification, Tour of Norway
5th Time trial, National Road Championships
2016
1st Road race, National Under-23 Road Championships
1st Overall ZLM Roompot Tour

1st Stage 1 (TTT)

1st Overall Tour de Gironde

1st Mountains classification
1st Young rider classification
1st Stage 2

1st Stage 2 Tour de l'Avenir
4th Tour of Flanders U23
5th Road race, UCI Road World Under-23 Championships
7th Grand Prix d'Isbergues
2017
2nd Druivenkoers Overijse
4th Schaal Sels
5th Binche–Chimay–Binche
8th Primus Classic
10th Tour de l'Eurométropole
2018
2nd Gooikse Pijl
7th Overall Tour des Fjords
2019
1st Road race, National Road Championships
1st Stage 2 (TTT) Tour de France
2nd Overall ZLM Tour

1st Stage 3

2nd Overall Four Days of Dunkirk
5th Bretagne Classic
5th London–Surrey Classic
8th Overall Arctic Race of Norway
10th Overall Tour of Britain
2024
1st Stage 1 (TTT) Okolo Slovenska

=== Grand Tour general classification results timeline ===
Grand Tour	2018	2019	2020	2021	2022
Giro d'Italia	—	—	—	—	—
Tour de France	139	140	128	DNF	132
Vuelta a España	—	—	—	—	—

Legend
—	Did not compete
DNF	Did not finish
