= Herman Dahl =

Norwegian cyclist

Personal information
- Full name: Herman Dahl
- Born: 24 November 1993 (age 32) Kristiansand, Norway
- Height: 1.92 m (6 ft 4 in)

Cycling career
- Sport: Cycling
- Current team: Retired
- Discipline: Road
- Role: Rider
- Rider type: Sprinter

Professional teams
- 2015–2017: Team Sparebanken Sør
- 2018–2020: Joker Icopal

Herman Dahl (born 24 November 1993) is a Norwegian former racing cyclist, who competed as a professional from 2015 to 2020. He competed in the men's team time trial event at the 2017 UCI Road World Championships.

== Major results ==
2016
5th Road race, National Road Championships
8th Gooikse Pijl
2017
1st Overall Baltic Chain Tour

1st Stages 3 & 4

6th Fyen Rundt
2018
1st GP Horsens
2nd Omloop Mandel-Leie-Schelde
6th Overall Tour de Bretagne

1st Stage 1

6th Fyen Rundt
2019
1st Stage 3 Tour of Rhodes
4th International Rhodes Grand Prix
6th Gooikse Pijl
2020
2nd International Rhodes Grand Prix
