= Ronde de l'Oise =

French multi-day road cycling race

Race details
- Date: Early June
- Region: Oise
- Discipline: Road
- Competition: UCI Europe Tour
- Type: Stage race
- Organiser: Union cycliste de Liancourt-Rantigny
- Race director: Michel Birck
- Web site: www.rondedeoise.com

History
- First edition: 1954
- Editions: 70 (as of 2026)
- First winner: Pierre Badosa (FRA)
- Most wins: Pierre Bataille (FRA); Eddy Seigneur (FRA); Jean-Michel Thilloy (FRA)(2 wins)
- Most recent: Patrick Eddy (AUS)

The Ronde de l'Oise is a cycling stage race held annually in the department of Oise in France. It was founded in 1954 and in 2007 became part of the UCI Europe Tour in category 2.2.

== Winners ==
| Year | Country | Rider | Team |
|---|---|---|---|
| 1954 | France | Pierre Badosa | U.S.B. Paris |
| 1955 | France | Roger Idoux | USM Gagny |
| 1956 | France | Georges Riera | V.C.C.A. |
| 1957 | France | Alain Henwood | V.C. Pont |
| 1958 | France | Pierre Bataille | Pedale Noyonnaise |
| 1959 | France | Ernest Vilfroy | VC Beauvais |
| 1960 | France | F. Delavault | Antony B.C. |
| 1961 | France | Jacques Fouquet | C.C. Creil |
| 1962 | France | Guy Bouchet | V.C. Compiègne |
| 1963 | France | Daniel Schneider | CSM Puteaux |
| 1964 | France | Pierre Bataille | Pedale Noyonnaise |
| 1965 | France | Alain Redolfi | U.C. Savigny |
| 1966 | France | L. Magnier | Pedale Noyonnaise |
| 1967 | France | Michel Martin | SV Senlis |
| 1968 | France | P. Spiguelaire | UMO Beaumont |
| 1969 | France | Éric Lalouette | VC Ponthieu |
| 1970 | France | C. Beraet | UMO Beaumont |
| 1971 | France | Castan | VC Beauchamp |
| 1972 | France | Lepied | UMO Beaumont |
| 1973 | France | François Accart | S.C. Picardie |
| 1974 | France | F. Cheve | UMO Beaumont |
| 1975 | France | G. Manchon | CM Aubervilliers |
| 1976 | France | Gilles Carrara | SV Senlis |
| 1977 | France | Walter Ricci | C.S.M. Persan |
| 1978 | France | Gilles Blanchardon | C.S.M. Persan |
| 1979 | France | Philippe Senez | C.S.M. Persan |
| 1980 | Australia | Daniel Vanechop | C.S.M. Persan |
| 1981 | France | Lionel Poret | Didier Louis |
| 1982 | France | Jean-Jacques Philippe | C.S.M. Persan |
| 1983 | France | André Fossé | CC Villeneuve |
| 1984 | France | Éric Martin | VC Beauvais |
| 1985 | France | Jean-Marc Follet | CC Villeneuve |
| 1986 | France | Gerard Aviègne | C.S.M. Persan |
| 1987 | France | Richard Vivien | Calvados |
| 1988 | France | Claude Carlin | ASPTT Paris |
| 1989 | France | Eddy Seigneur | Picardie |
| 1990 | France | Christophe Capelle | Bataillon de Joinville |
| 1991 | France | Eddy Seigneur | Cyclo-club de Nogent-sur-Oise |
| 1992 | France | Jean-Michel Thilloy | VC Rouen |
| 1993 | Netherlands | Marco Vermey | VC Amateur Saint-Quentin |
| 1994 | Belgium | Fabrice Naessens | Team Saleine |
| 1995 | France | Laurent Lefèvre | CPEF Flanders |
| 1996 | France | Vincent Templier | ASPTT Paris |
| 1997 | France | Jean-Michel Thilloy | VC Amateur Saint-Quentin |
| 1998 | Finland | Miika Hietanen | VC Amateur Saint-Quentin |
| 1999 | France | Mickaël Fouliard | Cyclo-club de Nogent-sur-Oise |
| 2000 | France | Jérémie Dérangère | S.C. Dijon |
| 2001 | France | Pascal Carlot | Cyclo-club de Nogent-sur-Oise |
| 2002 | France | Vincent Petilleau | VC Roubaix |
| 2003 | France | Christophe Riblon | Cyclo-club de Nogent-sur-Oise |
| 2004 | France | Sébastien Minard | Cyclo-club de Nogent-sur-Oise |
| 2005 | France | Thierry David | Vélo-Club La Pomme Marseille |
| 2006 | France | Franck Perque | Cyclo-club de Nogent-sur-Oise |
| 2007 | Sweden | Fredrik Johansson | Team Designa Køkken |
| 2008 | France | Niels Brouzes | Auber 93 |
| 2009 | Belgium | Steven Van Vooren | An Post–M.Donnelly–Grant Thornton–Sean Kelly |
| 2010 | France | Steven Tronet | Roubaix–Lille Métropole |
| 2011 | Lithuania | Gediminas Bagdonas | An Post–Sean Kelly |
| 2012 | France | Jean-Luc Delpech | Bretagne–Schuller |
| 2013 | Norway | Vegard Breen | Joker–Merida |
| 2014 | Denmark | Magnus Cort | Cult Energy–Vital Water |
| 2015 | Great Britain | Josh Edmondson | An Post–Chain Reaction |
| 2016 | Italy | Antonino Parrinello | D'Amico–Bottecchia |
| 2017 | France | Flavien Dassonville | HP BTP–Auber93 |
| 2018 | Norway | Henrik Evensen | Joker Icopal |
| 2019 | France | Anthony Maldonado | St. Michel–Auber93 |
| 2020– 2021 | No race due to the COVID-19 pandemic in France | | |
| 2022 | New Zealand | James Fouché | Bolton Equities Black Spoke Pro Cycling |
| 2023 | Netherlands | Frank van den Broek | ABLOC CT |
| 2024 | France | Pierre Barbier | Philippe Wagner–Bazin |
| 2025 | No race | | |
| 2026 | Australia | Patrick Eddy | Team Brennan |
