= Joker Fuel of Norway =

Norwegian cycling team

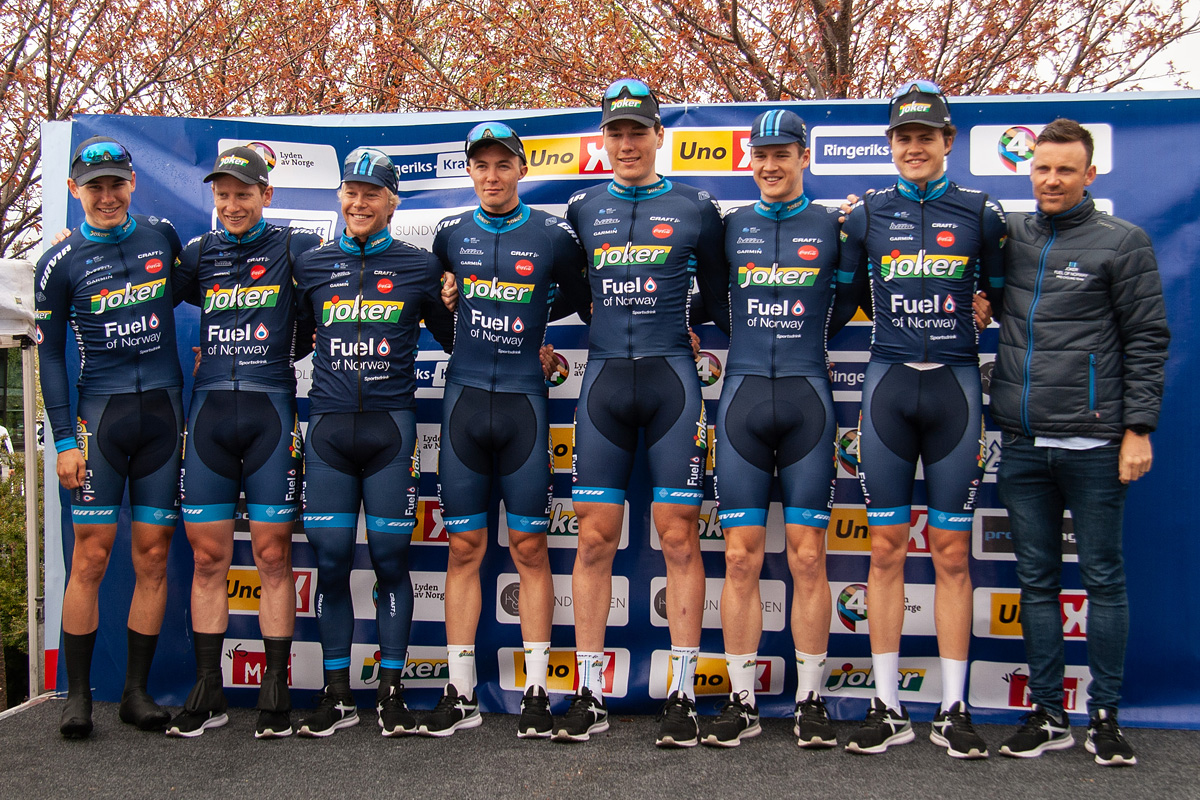

Team information
- UCI code: TMB (2005–2008); TJB (2009–2010, 2016); TJM (2011–2013); TJO (2014–2015); TJI (2017–2018); JFN (2019–2020)
- Registered: Norway
- Founded: 2005
- Disbanded: 2020
- Discipline: Road
- Status: Continental

Key personnel
- General manager: Birger Hungerholdt
- Team manager: Gino van Oudehove

Team name history
- 2005–2007 2008–2010 2011–2013 2014–2016 2016 2017–2018 2019–2020: Maxbo–Bianchi; Joker–Bianchi; Joker–Merida; Team Joker; Team Joker–Byggtorget; Joker Icopal; Joker Fuel of Norway

Joker Fuel of Norway (UCI team code: JFN) was a UCI Continental cycling team based in Norway, managed by Birger Hungerholdt with assistance from directeur sportifs Gino van Oudehove and Anders Linnestad. The team had well known riders, including Alexander Kristoff who rode for the team from 2007 to 2009, and Edvald Boasson Hagen who joined the team in 2006 Maxbo–Bianchi and in his first season in the continental circuits he took eight wins including three stages of the Tour de l'Avenir.

The team folded in 2020 due to financial pressures of the COVID-19 pandemic.

== Team roster ==
As of 6 April 2020.

Rider	Date of birth
Håkon Aalrust (NOR)	5 January 1998 (age 28)
Daniel Årnes (NOR)	6 June 2000 (age 26)
Herman Dahl (NOR)	24 November 1993 (age 32)
Ludvik Holstad (NOR)	1 August 1998 (age 28)
Ådne Holter (NOR)	8 July 2000 (age 26)
Øivind Lukkedal (NOR)	19 June 1994 (age 32)

Rider	Date of birth
Sondre Midtsveen (NOR)	11 September 1997 (age 28)
Fridtjof Røinås (NOR)	2 August 1994 (age 32)
Andreas Staune-Mittet (NOR)	5 July 1998 (age 28)
Søren Wærenskjold (NOR)	12 March 2000 (age 26)
Marius Wold (NOR)	16 July 1998 (age 28)

== Major wins ==
2006
Norway Road Race Championships, Lars Petter Nordhaug
Stage 4 Rhône-Alpes Isère Tour, Edvald Boasson Hagen
Stages 1 & 5 Thüringen Rundfahrt der U23, Edvald Boasson Hagen
GP Möbel Alvisse, Gabriel Rasch
Stage 3 Flèche du Sud, Christopher Myhre
Overall Ringerike GP, Gabriel Rasch

Stage 3, Edvald Boasson Hagen

Scandinavian Open Road Race, Edvald Boasson Hagen
Stages 2, 5 & 7 Tour de l'Avenir, Edvald Boasson Hagen
2007
Norway Time Trial Championships, Edvald Boasson Hagen
Norway Road Race Championships, Alexander Kristoff
Overall Istrian Spring Trophy, Edvald Boasson Hagen

Prologue, Edvald Boasson Hagen

Stage 6 Tour de Normandie, Edvald Boasson Hagen
Overall Rhône-Alpes Isère Tour, Gabriel Rasch

Stage 3, Gabriel Rasch

Stages 1 & 6 Tour de Bretagne, Edvald Boasson Hagen
Overall Ringerike GP, Edvald Boasson Hagen

Stages 1, 2, 3 & 5, Edvald Boasson Hagen

Overall Paris–Corrèze, Edvald Boasson Hagen

Stages 1 & 2, Edvald Boasson Hagen

Stage 4 Tour of Ireland, Edvald Boasson Hagen
2008
Stage 7 Tour de Bretagne, Frederik Wilmann
Stage 2 Olympia's Tour, Joachim Bohler
Stage 3 Ringerike GP, Joachim Bohler
Stage 4 Ringerike GP, Alexander Kristoff
2009
Poreč Trophy, Ole Haavardsholm
Stage 6 Tour de Normandie, Lars Petter Nordhaug
Stage 3 Ringerike GP, Alexander Kristoff
Stage 4 Ringerike GP, Sondre Sortveit
Stage 5 Ringerike GP, Stian Remme
Stage 1 Tour Alsace, Frederik Wilmann
Overall Mi-Août Bretonne, Frederik Wilmann
Stage 3 Tour of Ireland, Lars Petter Nordhaug
2010
Overall Ringerike GP, Christer Rake

Stage 4, Christer Rake

2011
Rogaland GP, Frederik Wilmann
Stage 5 Tour of Norway, Christer Rake
Stage 2 Tour of China, Adrian Gjølberg
2012
Norway Time Trial Championships, Reidar Borgersen
2013
Stage 3 Circuit des Ardennes, Team time trial
Ringerike GP, Reidar Borgersen
Overall Ronde de l'Oise, Vegard Breen
Gooikse Pijl, Vegard Robinson Bugge
2014
Norway Time Trial Championships, Reidar Borgersen
Arno Wallaard Memorial, Edvin Wilson
Overall Okolo Jižních Čech, Reidar Borgersen

Stage 2 (ITT), Reidar Borgersen

Duo Normand, Reidar Borgersen & Truls Korsæth
2015
Stage 3 Tour de Normandie, Daniel Hoelgaard
Stage 5 Tour de Normandie, Bjørn Tore Hoem
Stage 1 Tour de Bretagne, Adrian Aas Stien
Stage 5 Tour de Bretagne, Daniel Hoelgaard
Stage 3 Ronde de l'Oise, Vegard Stake Laengen
Overall Tour Alsace, Vegard Stake Laengen

Stage 1, Bjørn Tore Hoem
Stage 3, Vegard Stake Laengen

2016
Overall Tour de Gironde, Amund Grøndahl Jansen

Stage 1, Truls Korsæth
Stage 2, Amund Grøndahl Jansen
Stage 3, Adrian Aas Stien

Grand Prix d'Isbergues, Kristoffer Halvorsen
Stages 3b & 4 Olympia's Tour, Kristoffer Halvorsen
UCI Under-23 World Road Race Championships, Kristoffer Halvorsen
2017
Handzame Classic, Kristoffer Halvorsen
Stage 1 Circuit des Ardennes, Markus Hoelgaard
Norway Road Race Championships, Rasmus Tiller
Stage 1 Tour Alsace, Markus Hoelgaard
Stage 3 Tour Alsace, Carl Fredrik Hagen
2018
Overall Tour du Jura, Carl Fredrik Hagen
Stage 1 Tour de Bretagne, Herman Dahl
Prologue Grand Prix Priessnitz spa, Rasmus Tiller
Overall Ronde de l'Oise, Henrik Evensen

Stages 1 & 4, Henrik Evensen

GP Horsens, Herman Dahl
2019
Stage 3 International Tour of Rhodes, Herman Dahl
Stage 4 Tour de Normandie, Ole Forfang
2020
Stage 1 International Tour of Rhodes, Søren Wærenskjold

== National Champions ==
2006
Norway Road Race Championships, Lars Petter Nordhaug
2007
Norway Time Trial Championships, Edvald Boasson Hagen
Norway Race Championships, Alexander Kristoff
2012
Norway Time Trial Championships, Reidar Borgersen
2014
Norway Time Trial Championships, Reidar Borgersen
2017
Norway Road Race Championships, Rasmus Tiller
