= Norwegian National Time Trial Championships =

National road cycling championship in Norway

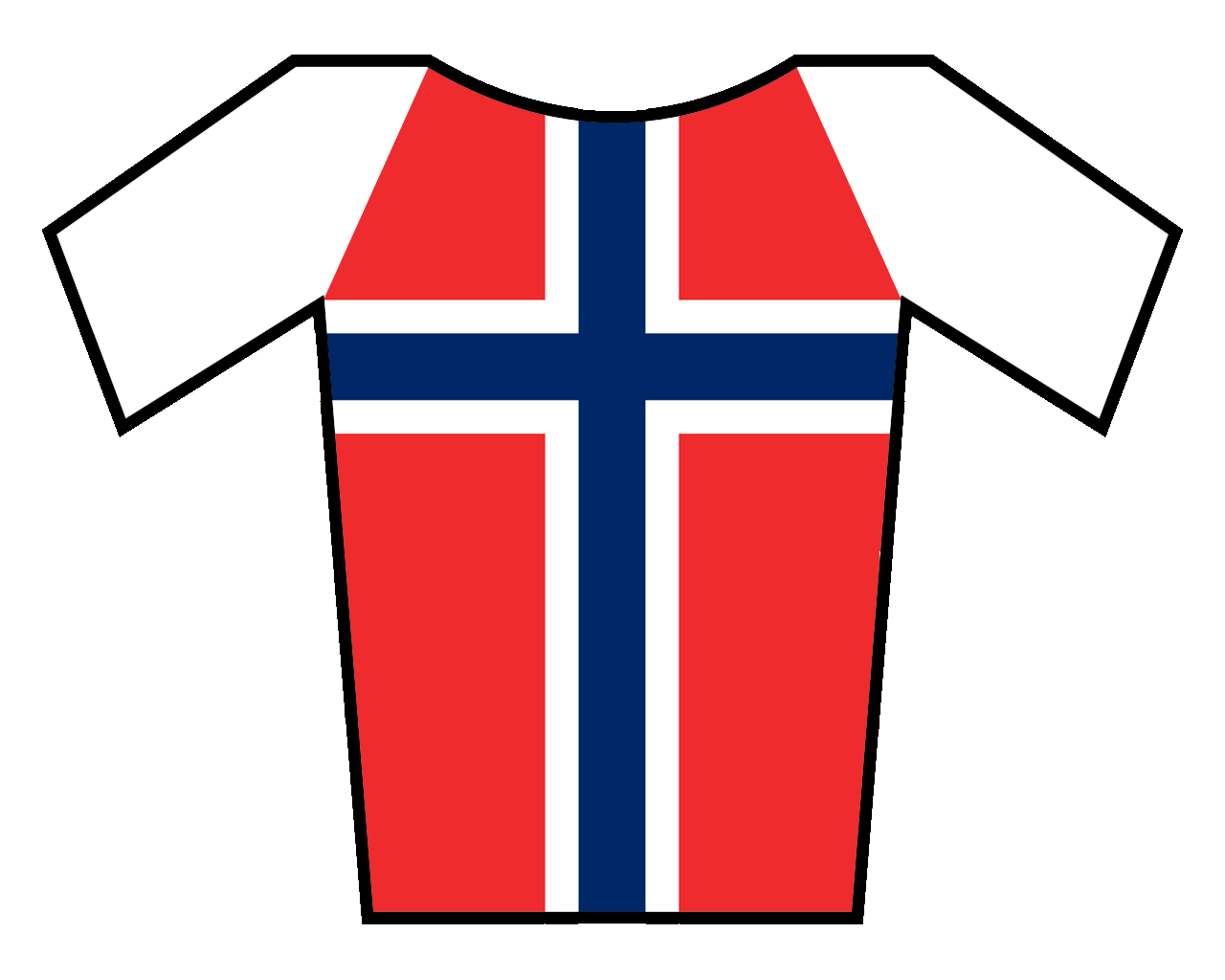
The Champion's Jersey

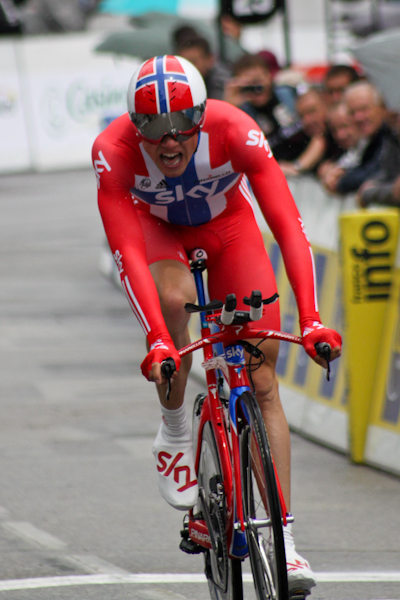
Edvald Boasson Hagen

The Norwegian National Time Trial Championships are held annually. They are a cycling race which decides the Norwegian cycling champion in the time trial discipline, across several categories of rider. The event was first held in 1921 and was won by Ole Moen. At the beginning there were often back-to-back wins from many riders. Recent multiple victors have included Edvald Boasson Hagen, Thor Hushovd, Kurt Asle Arvesen and Steffen Kjærgaard. The current champions are Tobias Foss and Ane Iversen.

== Multiple winners ==
Men

Wins	Name
10	Edvald Boasson Hagen
7	Aage Myhrvold
6	Geir Digerud
5	Steffen Kjærgaard
5	Per Digerud
4	Ragnvald Martinsen
3	Thor Hushovd
3	Jan Bakke
3	Morten Sæther
3	Bjørn Stenersen
2	Ragnar Johansen
2	Trond Svendsen
2	Knut Knudsen
2	Tobias Foss
2	Reidar Borgersen
2	Kurt Asle Arvesen
2	Andreas Leknessund
2	Olav Moxness

Women

Wins	Name
6	Anita Valen
5	Unni Larsen
4	May Britt Hartwell
3	Monika Valen
3	Solrun Flatås Risnes
3	Vita Heine
2	Ingunn Bollerud
2	Wenche Stensvold
2	Gunn Hilleren
2	Katrine Aalerud

== Men ==
=== Elite ===
Year	Gold	Silver	Bronze
1921	Ole Moen		
1922	James Kristiansen		
1923	Sverre Aune		
1924	Reidar Raaen		
1925	Egil Reichborn-Kjennerud		
1926	Olav Moxness		
1927	Trond Svendsen		
1928	Olav Moxness		
1929	Ragnvald Martinsen		
1930	Trond Svendsen		
1931	Ragnvald Martinsen		
1932	Ragnar Johansen		
1933	Reidar Hansen		
1934	Ragnvald Martinsen		
1935	Roald Stenersen		
1936	Ragnvald Martinsen		
1937	Ragnar Johansen		
1938	Leif Ekås		
1939	Aage Myhrvold		
1940	Aage Myhrvold		
1941–45	suspended due to World War II		
1946	Aage Myhrvold		
1947	Aage Myhrvold		
1948	Erling Kristiansen		
1949	Aage Myhrvold		
1950	Kjell Pedersen		
1951	not disputed		
1952	Aage Myhrvold		
1953	Aage Myhrvold		
1954	Arthur Borge		
1955	Per Digerud		
1956	Roald Aas		
1957	Per Digerud		
1958	Per Digerud		
1959	Jan Bakke		
1960	Jan Bakke		
1961	Per Digerud		
1962	Per Digerud		
1963	Jan Bakke		
1964	Thorleif Andresen		
1965	Jan Helland		
1966	Knut Eie		
1967	Cato Nordbeck		
1968	Nils Algerøy		
1969	Leif Yli		
1970	Arve Haugen		
1971	Dag Linnestad		
1972	Knut Knudsen		
1973	Knut Knudsen		
1974	Willie Pedersen		
1975	Geir Digerud		
1976	Geir Digerud		
1977	Geir Digerud		
1978	Geir Digerud		
1979	Geir Digerud		
1980	Geir Digerud		
1981	Morten Sæther		
1982	Ole Kristian Silseth		
1983	Morten Sæther		
1984	Arnstein Raunehaug		
1985	Torjus Larsen		
1986	Jaanus Kuum		
1987	Morten Sæther		
1988	Jørn Skaane		
1989	Bjørn Stenersen		
1990	Dag Otto Lauritzen		
1991	Bjørn Stenersen		
1992	Bjørn Stenersen		
1993	Leif Eriksen		
1994	Stig Kristiansen		
1995	Ole Simensen		
1996	Steffen Kjærgaard		
1997	Steffen Kjærgaard		
1998	Steffen Kjærgaard		
1999	Steffen Kjærgaard	Bjørnar Vestøl	Svein Gaute Hølestøl
2000	Svein Gaute Hølestøl	Bjørnar Vestøl	Stig Kristiansen
2001	Kurt Asle Arvesen	Geir Lien	Mads Kaggestad
2002	Thor Hushovd	Steffen Kjærgaard	Bjørnar Vestøl
2003	Steffen Kjærgaard	Kurt Asle Arvesen	Bjørnar Vestøl
2004	Thor Hushovd	Kurt Asle Arvesen	Terje Tho
2005	Thor Hushovd	Kurt Asle Arvesen	Knut Anders Fostervold
2006	Kurt Asle Arvesen	Kjetil Ingvaldsen	Knut Anders Fostervold
2007	Edvald Boasson Hagen	Knut Anders Fostervold	Kurt Asle Arvesen
2008	Edvald Boasson Hagen	Geir Lien	Knut Anders Fostervold
2009	Edvald Boasson Hagen	Kurt Asle Arvesen	Frederik Wilmann
2010	Edvald Boasson Hagen	Reidar Borgersen	Stian Saugstad
2011	Edvald Boasson Hagen	Reidar Borgersen	Lorents Aasvold
2012	Reidar Borgersen	Edvald Boasson Hagen	Lars Petter Nordhaug
2013	Edvald Boasson Hagen	Thor Hushovd	Reidar Borgersen
2014	Reidar Borgersen	Bjørn Tore Hoem	Andreas Vangstad
2015	Edvald Boasson Hagen	Andreas Vangstad	Truls Korsæth
2016	Edvald Boasson Hagen	Vegard Stake Laengen	Andreas Vangstad
2017	Edvald Boasson Hagen	Andreas Vangstad	Kristoffer Skjerping
2018	Edvald Boasson Hagen	Andreas Leknessund	Kristoffer Skjerping
2019	Andreas Leknessund	Iver Knotten	Edvald Boasson Hagen
2020	Andreas Leknessund	Tobias Foss	Søren Wærenskjold
2021	Tobias Foss	Søren Wærenskjold	Andreas Leknessund
2022	Tobias Foss	Søren Wærenskjold	Truls Nordhagen
2023	Søren Wærenskjold	Iver Knotten	Andreas Leknessund

== Women ==
Year	Gold	Silver	Bronze
1976	May Britt Nilsen		
1977	Unni Larsen		
1978	Unni Larsen		
1979	Bjørg Eva Jensen		
1980	Elisabeth Fagernes		
1981	Liv Hegstad		
1982	Unni Larsen		
1983	Marit Ericssen		
1984	Unni Larsen		
1985	Anita Valen		
1986	Unni Larsen		
1987	Astrid Danielsen		
1988	Tone Benjaminsen		
1989	May Britt Hartwell		
1990	May Britt Hartwell		
1991	Ingunn Bollerud		
1992	Monika Valen		
1993	Monika Valen		
1994	May Britt Hartwell		
1995	May Britt Hartwell		
1996	Ingunn Bollerud		
1997	Monika Valen		
1998	Wenche Stensvold	Monika Valen	Jorunn Kvalø
1999	Solrun Flatås Risnes	Wenche Stensvold	Anne Kristine Tyssø
2000	Wenche Stensvold	Solrun Flatås Risnes	Ingunn Bollerud
2001	Solrun Flatås Risnes	Jorunn Kvalø	Gunn-Rita Dahle
2002	Solrun Flatås Risnes	Anita Valen	Wenche Stensvold
2003	Anita Valen	Linn Torp	Camilla Hott Johansen
2004	Anita Valen	Anette Lysebo	Camilla Hott Johansen
2005	Anita Valen	Camilla Hott Johansen	Gunn Hilleren
2006	Anny Hauglid	Camilla Hott Johansen	Gunn Hilleren
2007	Anita Valen	Elin Fylkesnes	Gunn Hilleren
2008	Anita Valen	Elin Fylkesnes	Anny Hauglid
2009	Gunn Hilleren	Bjørg Eva Jensen	Elin Fylkesnes
2010	Gunn Hilleren	Elin Fylkesnes	Thrude Natholmen
2011	Camilla Hott Johansen	Bjørg Eva Jensen	Lise Nøstvold
2012	Lise Nøstvold	Cecilie Gotaas Johnsen	Tina Andreassen
2013	Tina Andreassen	Cecilie Gotaas Johnsen	Hildegunn Gjertrud Hovdenak
2014	Thrude Natholmen	Tina Andreassen	Cecilie Gotaas Johnsen
2015	Cecilie Gotaas Johnsen	Marie Elise Ommundsen	Thrude Natholmen
2016	Vita Heine	Cecilie Gotaas Johnsen	Miriam Bjørnsrud
2017	Vita Heine	Thea Thorsen	Katrine Aalerud
2018	Line Marie Gulliksen	Thea Thorsen	Vita Heine
2019	Vita Heine	Katrine Aalerud	Line Marie Gulliksen
2020	Katrine Aalerud	Vita Heine	Elise Marie Olsen
2021	Katrine Aalerud	Vita Heine	Mie Bjørndal Ottestad
2022	Ane Iversen	Katrine Aalerud	Marte Berg Edseth
2023	Mie Bjørndal Ottestad	Ane Iversen	Sigrid Ytterhus Haugset

== See also ==
- Norwegian National Road Race Championships
- National Road Cycling Championships
