= List of rosters for Team Hitec Products UCK and its successors =

This page lists the rosters of the UCI Women's Team – Team Hitec Products – sorted by season.

== 2016 ==
As of 2 February 2016

| Rider | Date of birth |
|---|---|
| Susanne Andersen (NOR) | 23 July 1998 (aged 17) |
| Charlotte Becker (GER) | 19 May 1983 (aged 32) |
| Miriam Bjørnsrud (NOR) | 9 October 1992 (aged 23) |
| Simona Frapporti (ITA) | 14 July 1988 (aged 27) |
| Tatiana Guderzo (ITA) | 22 August 1984 (aged 31) |
| Janicke Gunvaldsen (NOR) | 19 May 1981 (aged 34) |
| Vita Heine (NOR) | 21 November 1984 (aged 31) |
| Cecilie Gotaas Johnsen (NOR) | 20 April 1976 (aged 39) |

| Rider | Date of birth |
|---|---|
| Lauren Kitchen (AUS) | 21 November 1990 (aged 25) |
| Julie Leth (DEN) | 13 July 1992 (aged 23) |
| Tone Hatteland Lima (NOR) | 18 December 1979 (aged 36) |
| Ingrid Lorvik (NOR) | 14 February 1987 (aged 28) |
| Emilie Moberg (NOR) | 12 July 1991 (aged 24) |
| Thea Thorsen (NOR) | 15 March 1992 (aged 23) |
| Kirsten Wild (NED) | 15 October 1982 (aged 33) |

== 2015 ==
As of 10 March 2015. Ages as of 1 January 2015.

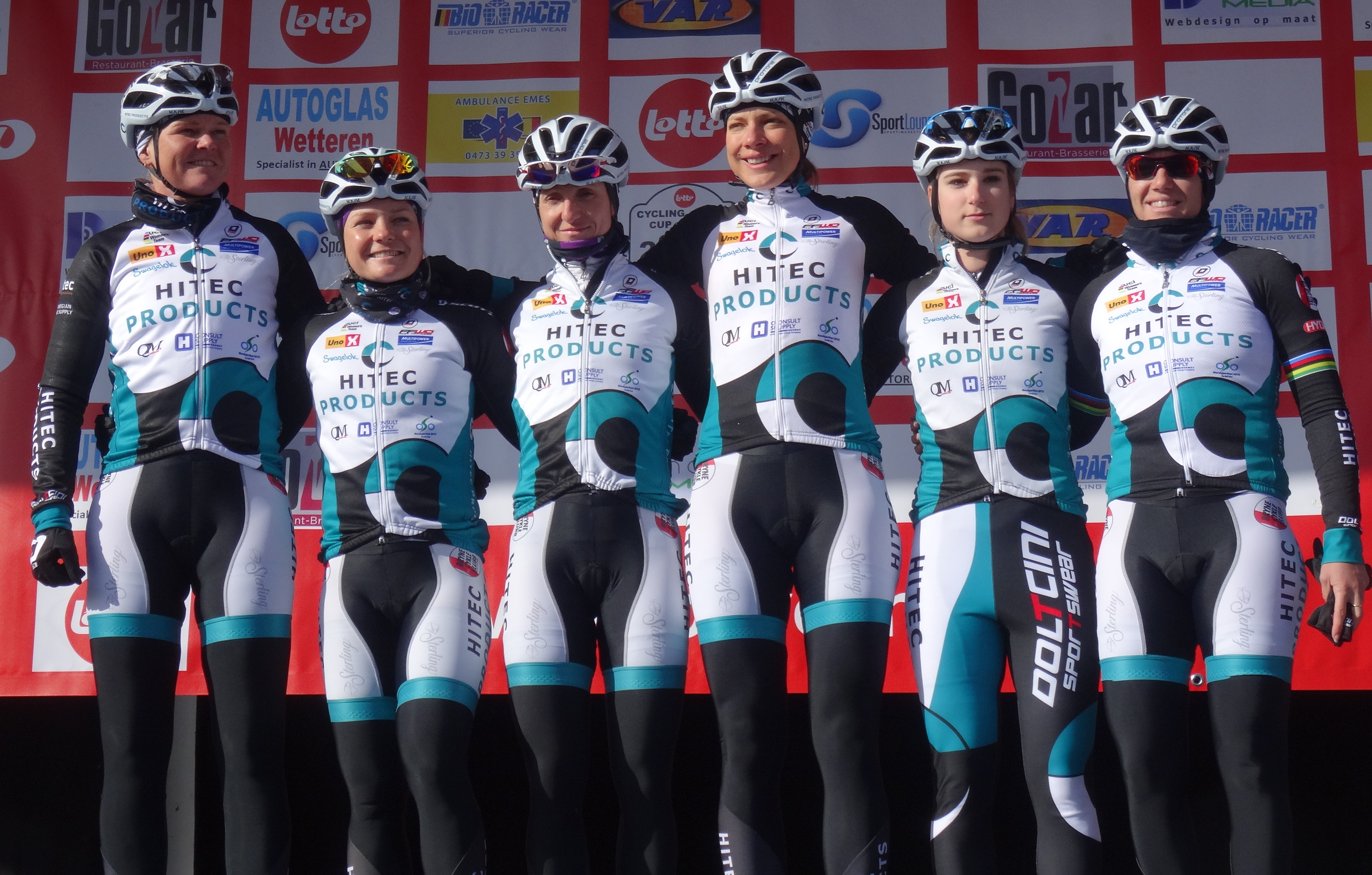
The squad during the 2015 Le Samyn des Dames

| Rider | Date of birth |
|---|---|
| Charlotte Becker (GER) | May 19, 1983 (aged 31) |
| Lauren Kitchen (AUS) | November 21, 1990 (aged 24) |
| Shana Van Glabeke (BEL) | September 28, 1993 (aged 21) |
| Julie Leth (DEN) | July 13, 1992 (aged 22) |
| Tatiana Guderzo (ITA) | August 22, 1984 (aged 30) |
| Miriam Bjørnsrud (NOR) | October 9, 1992 (aged 22) |

| Rider | Date of birth |
|---|---|
| Emilie Moberg (NOR) | July 12, 1991 (aged 23) |
| Thea Thorsen (NOR) | March 15, 1992 (aged 22) |
| Tone Hatteland Lima (NOR) | December 18, 1979 (aged 35) |
| Cecilie Gotaas Johnsen (NOR) | April 20, 1976 (aged 38) |
| Vita Heine (NOR) | November 21, 1984 (aged 30) |
| Kirsten Wild (NED) | October 15, 1982 (aged 32) |

== 2013 ==
As of 1 January 2013

| Rider | Date of birth |
|---|---|
| Miriam Bjørnsrud (NOR) | October 9, 1992 (aged 20) |
| Emilia Fahlin (SWE) | October 24, 1988 (aged 24) |
| Daniela Glass (GER) | November 5, 1980 (aged 32) |
| Tone Hatteland Lima (NOR) | December 18, 1979 (aged 33) |
| Rakel Kristine Henriksen (NOR) | April 12, 1991 (aged 21) |
| Chloe Hosking (AUS) | October 1, 1990 (aged 22) |
| Cecilie Gotaas Johnsen (NOR) | April 20, 1976 (aged 36) |
| Elisa Longo Borghini (ITA) | December 10, 1991 (aged 21) |

| Rider | Date of birth |
|---|---|
| Siri Minge (NOR) | April 2, 1994 (aged 18) |
| Emilie Moberg (NOR) | July 12, 1991 (aged 21) |
| Rachel Neylan (AUS) | March 9, 1982 (aged 30) |
| Lise Hafsø Nøstvold (NOR) | February 14, 1987 (aged 25) |
| Margrethe Pedersen (NOR) | September 15, 1991 (aged 21) |
| Rossella Ratto (ITA) | October 20, 1993 (aged 19) |
| Thea Thorsen (NOR) | March 15, 1992 (aged 20) |

== 2012 ==
Ages as of 1 January 2012.

| Rider | Date of birth |
|---|---|
| Johanna Bergseth (NOR) | August 26, 1987 (aged 24) |
| Christel Ferrier-Bruneau (FRA) | July 8, 1979 (aged 32) |
| Cecilie Johansen (NOR) | October 2, 1989 (aged 22) |
| Emma Johansson (SWE) | September 23, 1983 (aged 28) |
| Cecilie Gotaas Johnsen (NOR) | April 20, 1976 (aged 35) |
| Sylwia Kapusta (POL) | December 8, 1982 (aged 29) |
| Tone Hatteland Lima (NOR) | December 18, 1979 (aged 32) |

| Rider | Date of birth |
|---|---|
| Elisa Longo Borghini (ITA) | December 10, 1991 (aged 20) |
| Emilie Moberg (NOR) | July 12, 1991 (aged 20) |
| Sara Mustonen Lichan (SWE) | February 8, 1981 (aged 30) |
| Lise Nostvold (NOR) | February 14, 1987 (aged 24) |
| Thea Thorsen (NOR) | March 15, 1992 (aged 19) |
| Marie Voreland (NOR) | September 20, 1990 (aged 21) |
| Fröydis Waersted (NOR) | June 15, 1987 (aged 24) |

== 2011 ==
Ages as of 1 January 2011.

| Rider | Date of birth |
|---|---|
| Johanna Bergseth (NOR) | August 26, 1987 (aged 23) |
| Lisa Brennauer (GER) | June 8, 1988 (aged 22) |
| Tiffany Cromwell (AUS) | July 6, 1988 (aged 22) |
| Cecilie Johansen (NOR) | October 2, 1989 (aged 21) |
| Emma Johansson (SWE) | September 23, 1983 (aged 27) |
| Tone Hatteland Lima (NOR) | December 18, 1979 (aged 31) |

| Rider | Date of birth |
|---|---|
| Emilie Moberg (NOR) | July 12, 1991 (aged 19) |
| Sara Mustonen Lichan (SWE) | February 8, 1981 (aged 29) |
| Lise Nostvold (NOR) | February 14, 1987 (aged 23) |
| Kristine Saastad (NOR) | August 31, 1987 (aged 23) |
| Marie Voreland (NOR) | September 20, 1990 (aged 20) |
| Fröydis Waersted (NOR) | June 15, 1987 (aged 23) |
