= 2009 UCI Road World Championships – Qualification =

This page is an overview of the qualification criteria for the 2009 UCI Road World Championships.

== Elite events ==
=== Elite men's road race ===
Qualification was based on performances on the UCI run tours during 2009. Results from January to the middle of August would count towards the qualification criteria on both the 2009 UCI ProTour and the UCI Continental Circuits across the world, with the rankings being determined upon the release of the numerous tour rankings on 15 August 2009.

14 to be enrolled, 9 to start
Spain
Italy
Belgium
Germany
Luxembourg
Australia
United States
United Kingdom
Russia
Norway
9 to be enrolled, 6 to start
South Africa
Colombia
Venezuela
Kazakhstan
France
Netherlands
Slovenia
Poland
Ukraine
Denmark
Switzerland
5 to be enrolled, 3 to start
Tunisia
Argentina
Canada
Brazil
Japan
Iran
Portugal
Estonia
Austria
Croatia
Hungary
Sweden
Latvia
Serbia
New Zealand
Czech Republic
Ireland
Slovakia
Belarus
2 to be enrolled, 1 to start
Lithuania
Finland
Namibia
Cuba
Chile
Costa Rica
Ecuador
Uruguay
Bulgaria

=== Elite women's road race ===
Qualification will be based mainly on the 2009 UCI Nation Ranking as of 15 August 2009. The first five nations in this classification qualified 7 riders to start, the next ten nations qualified 6 riders to start and the next 5 nations qualified 5 riders to start. Other nations and non ranked nations had the possibility to send 3 riders to start. Moreover, the outgoing World Champion and continental champions are qualified to take part in the race on top of the nation numbers.

=== Elite men's time trial ===
All National Federations were allowed to register four riders for the race, with a maximum of two riders to start. In addition to this number, the outgoing World Champion and the current continental champions may take part.

=== Elite women's time trial ===
All National Federations were allowed to register four riders for the race, with a maximum of two riders to start. In addition to this number, the outgoing World Champion and the current continental champions were also able to take part.

Champion	Name	Note
Outgoing World Champion	Amber Neben (USA)	
African Champion	Cashandra Slingerland (RSA)	Did not participate
Asian Champion	Tang Kerong (CHN)	Did not participate
European Champion (under-23)	Ellen van Dijk (NED)	
Oceanian Champion	Bridie O'Donnell (AUS)	

== Under-23 events ==
=== Men's under-23 time trial ===
All National Federations were allowed to register four riders for the race, with a maximum of two riders to start. In addition to this number, the outgoing World Champion and the current continental champions may take part
