= Aage Myhrvold =

Norwegian cyclist

Personal information
- Born: 29 September 1918 Oslo, Norway
- Died: 16 June 1987 (aged 68) Oslo, Norway

Cycling career
- Sport: Cycling

Aage Myhrvold (29 September 1918 – 16 June 1987) was a Norwegian cyclist. He won thirteen national titles in road cycling, and three titles in track cycling, and represented Norway at the 1948 Summer Olympics.

== Career ==
Myhrvold won a total of thirteen individual national titles in the Norwegian National Time Trial Championships, a record number. He won the 30 km race in 1939, 1940, 1946, 1947, 1949, 1952, and 1953, and the 100 km race in 1937, 1938, 1940, 1949, 1951, and 1953. He also won three national titles in track cycling, and 13 team titles.

He was awarded the Kongepokal trophy five times.

He represented the clubs SK Rye and IK Hero.

He competed in the individual and team road race events at the 1948 Summer Olympics.

== Personal life ==
Myhrvold was born in Christiania (now Oslo) on 29 September 1918.

He died in Oslo on 16 June 1987.
