= 2014 Chrono des Nations (women's race) =

Race details
- Dates: 19 October 2014
- Stages: 1
- Distance: 20.87 km (12.97 mi)
- Winning time: 27' 37"

Results
	Winner	Hanna Solovey (UKR)	(Ukraine National team)
	Second	Alison Tetrick (USA)	(Astana BePink)
	Third	Mélodie Lesueur (FRA)	(Lointek)

The 2014 Chrono des Nations was a one-day time trial held at the end of the European cycling season in France on 19 October. The race has an UCI rating of 1.1. The race was won by Ukrainian Hanna Solovey.

== Results ==
	Rider	Team	Time
1	Hanna Solovey (UKR)	Ukraine (National team)	27' 37"
2	Alison Tetrick (USA)	Astana BePink	+ 1' 25"
3	Mélodie Lesueur (FRA)	Lointek	+ 1' 52"
4	Edwige Pitel (FRA)	S.C. Michela Fanini Rox	+ 1' 53"
5	Tatiana Antoshina (RUS)	RusVelo	+ 1' 55"
6	Cecilie Gotaas Johnsen (NOR)	Team Hitec Products	+ 2' 00"
7	Annabelle Dreville (FRA)		+ 2' 13"
8	Marjolaine Bazin (FRA)	Chambéry Cyclisme Competition	+ 2' 54"
9	Lija Laizāne (LAT)	Vaiano-Fondriest	+ 3' 01"
10	Hayley Simmonds (GBR)		+ 3' 19"
