= Wenche Stensvold =

Norwegian cyclist

Personal information
- Born: 8 June 1975 (age 51) Norway

Cycling career
- Sport: Cycling
- Discipline: Road cycling
- Role: Rider

Professional team
- 2001-2002: Team Sponsor Service

Major wins
- Norwegian National Time Trial Championships (1998, 2000)

Wenche Stensvold (born 8 June 1975) is a former Norwegian professional road cyclist.

She is 6-times National Championships medalist, including becoming national Champion at the Norwegian National Time Trial Championships in 1998 and 2000. She represented her nation at the 1998, 1999, 2000, 2001 and 2002 UCI Road World Championships.

After her career she survived leukemia an unusual amount of six times.

== Biography ==
=== Cycling career ===
Her first main result was winning the bronze medal at the Norwegian National Time Trial Championships in 1997 behind Monika Valen and Jorunn Kvalø. The next year she beat Valen and Kvalø and so became Norwegian National Time Trial Champion where the podium consisted of the same three riders. She was selected to represent her nation at 1998 UCI Road World Championships in Valkenburg, the Netherlands.

The next year she won the silver medal at the 1999 National Time Trial Championships and among others represented her national at the 1999 UCI Road World Championships in Verona, Italy. In 2000 she became again National Time Trial champion and had a top-8 finish at the 2000 UCI Road World Championships in Plouay, France in the women's road race.

Due to her achievements she became a professional cyclist in 2001, becoming a member of the 2001 UCI Women's Team "Team Sponsor Service" where she would be a member for until 2002. In 2001 she had podium finished in stages of two of the main women's international classification races the 2001 Holland Ladies Tour and Thüringen Ladies Tour. She finished in these races 7th and 8th in the general classification.

In her last year as a professional cyclist she won the silver medal at both the national road race championships and time trial championships and represented her national for the 5th consecutive time at the 2002 UCI Road World Championships in Limburg, Belgium.

=== Personal life ===
Stensvold was born on 8 June 1975. She has a brother Johnny. She lived in Frei, Kristiansund Municipality in the Nordmøre district. After her cycling career she became a trained nurse and has had a full-time job in an administrative role for many years. She became a department manager afterwards at Nordberghjemmet in Oslo.

==== Leukemia ====
At the age of 29, 1.5 year after her cycling career, she was diagnosed with leukemia for the first time and underwent chemotherapy treatments. However in the winter of 2005 she heard she had relapsed. She received stem cell transplantation in her bone marrow which she received from her brother. However, year after year she had a replase and was diagnozed in 2009 with leukemia for the sixth time. In 2006 she was diagnozed for the sixth time. She and her brother decided to set goals for the future. Since then, they have completed several hill races and duathlon and triathlon together. Some main events they finished together were the New York Marathon and Amsterdam Marathon. Stensvold also survived for the sixth time the cancer. She has had 375 blood donors.
