= 2013 Tour of Chongming Island =

Race details
- Dates: 8–10 May
- Stages: 3
- Distance: 267.9 km (166.5 mi)
- Winning time: 6h 29' 26"

Results
Jersey awarded to the overall winner	Winner	Annette Edmondson (AUS)	(Orica–AIS)
	Second	Chloe Hosking (AUS)	(Team Hitec Products)
	Third	Lucy Garner (GBR)	(Argos–Shimano)
Jersey awarded to the points classification winner	Points	Chloe Hosking (AUS)	(Team Hitec Products)
	Team	Faren–Let's Go Finland	

The 2013 Tour of Chongming Island was a stage race held in China, with a UCI rating of 2.1. It was the eighth stage race of the 2013 Women's Elite cycling calendar.

== Stages ==
=== Stage 1 ===
8 May 2013 — Chongbei, 73.4 km (45.6 mi)

Result of stage 1
Rank	Rider	Team	Time
1	Lucy Garner (GBR)	Argos–Shimano	1h 47' 18"
2	Chloe Hosking (AUS)	Team Hitec Products	s.t.
3	Oxana Kozonchuk (RUS)	RusVelo	s.t.
4	Emma Johansson (SWE)	Orica–AIS	s.t.
5	Shelley Olds (USA)	Team TIBCO-To The Top	s.t.
6	Marta Bastianelli (ITA)	Faren–Let's Go Finland	s.t.
7	Simona Frapporti (ITA)	BePink	s.t.
8	Marta Tagliaferro (ITA)	MCipollini–Giordana	s.t.
9	Pascale Jeuland (FRA)	France national team	s.t.
10	Sara Mustonen (SWE)	Faren–Let's Go Finland	s.t.
Source: ProCyclingStats

General classification after stage 1
Rank	Rider	Team	Time
1	Lucy Garner (GBR)	Argos–Shimano	1h 47' 18"
2	Chloe Hosking (AUS)	Team Hitec Products	+ 1"
3	Annette Edmondson (AUS)	Orica–AIS	+ 5"
4	Oxana Kozonchuk (RUS)	RusVelo	+ 6"
5	Emma Johansson (SWE)	Orica–AIS	+ 7"
6	Sara Mustonen (SWE)	Faren–Let's Go Finland	+ 9"
7	Shelley Olds (USA)	Team TIBCO-To The Top	+ 10"
8	Marta Bastianelli (ITA)	Faren–Let's Go Finland	+ 10"
9	Simona Frapporti (ITA)	BePink	+ 10"
10	Marta Tagliaferro (ITA)	MCipollini–Giordana	+ 10"
Source: ProCyclingStats

=== Stage 2 ===
9 May 2013 — Chong West, 113.7 km (70.6 mi)

Result of stage 2
Rank	Rider	Team	Time
1	Giorgia Bronzini (ITA)	Wiggle–Honda	2h 44' 26"
2	Chloe Hosking (AUS)	Team Hitec Products	s.t.
3	Annette Edmondson (AUS)	Orica–AIS	s.t.
4	Sara Mustonen (SWE)	Faren–Let's Go Finland	s.t.
5	Marta Bastianelli (ITA)	Faren–Let's Go Finland	s.t.
6	Kim de Baat (NED)	Boels–Dolmans	s.t.
7	Lucy Garner (GBR)	Argos–Shimano	s.t.
8	Romy Kasper (GER)	Boels–Dolmans	s.t.
9	Roxane Fournier (FRA)	France national team	s.t.
10	Oxana Kozonchuk (RUS)	RusVelo	s.t.
Source: ProCyclingStats

General classification after stage 2
Rank	Rider	Team	Time
1	Chloe Hosking (AUS)	Team Hitec Products	s.t.
2	Annette Edmondson (AUS)	Orica–AIS	+ 6"
3	Lucy Garner (GBR)	Argos–Shimano	+ 9"
4	Giorgia Bronzini (ITA)	Wiggle–Honda	+ 9"
5	Oxana Kozonchuk (RUS)	RusVelo	+ 15"
6	Emma Johansson (SWE)	Orica–AIS	+ 15"
7	Sara Mustonen (SWE)	Faren–Let's Go Finland	+ 18"
8	Shelley Olds (GBR)	Team TIBCO-To The Top	+ 18"
9	Marta Bastianelli (ITA)	Faren–Let's Go Finland	+ 19"
10	Simona Frapporti (ITA)	BePink	+ 19"
Source: ProCyclingStats

=== Stage 3 ===
10 May 2013 — Chongming, 80.8 km (50.2 mi)

Result of stage 3
Rank	Rider	Team	Time
1	Annette Edmondson (AUS)	Orica–AIS	1h 58' 09"
2	Marta Bastianelli (ITA)	Faren–Let's Go Finland	s.t.
3	Emma Johansson (SWE)	Orica–AIS	s.t.
4	Sara Mustonen (SWE)	Faren–Let's Go Finland	s.t.
5	Giorgia Bronzini (ITA)	Wiggle–Honda	s.t.
6	Lucy Garner (GBR)	Argos–Shimano	s.t.
7	Shelley Olds (GBR)	Team TIBCO-To The Top	s.t.
8	Pascale Jeuland (FRA)	France national team	s.t.
9	Roxane Fournier (FRA)	France national team	s.t.
10	Rochelle Gilmore (AUS)	Wiggle–Honda	s.t.
Source: ProCyclingStats

General classification after stage 3
Rank	Rider	Team	Time
1	Annette Edmondson (AUS)	Orica–AIS	6h 29' 26"
2	Chloe Hosking (AUS)	Team Hitec Products	+ 1"
3	Lucy Garner (GBR)	Argos–Shimano	+ 17"
4	Giorgia Bronzini (ITA)	Wiggle–Honda	+ 17"
5	Emma Johansson (SWE)	Orica–AIS	+ 19"
6	Marta Bastianelli (ITA)	Faren–Let's Go Finland	+ 21"
7	Oxana Kozonchuk (RUS)	RusVelo	+ 23"
8	Shelley Olds (USA)	Team TIBCO-To The Top	+ 25"
9	Amy Pieters (NED)	Argos–Shimano	+ 25"
10	Sara Mustonen (SWE)	Faren–Let's Go Finland	+ 26"
Source: ProCyclingStats
