= 2014 Chrono Champenois-Trophée Européen =

2014 Chrono Champenois - Trophée Européen
2014 in women's road cycling

Race details
- Dates: 14 September 2014
- Stages: 1
- Distance: 33.40 km (20.75 mi)

The 2014 Chrono Champenois – Trophée Européen is the 25th running of the Chrono Champenois - Trophée Européen, a women's individual time trial bicycle race in France and was held on 14 September 2014 over a distance of 33.40 kilometres (20.8 miles). It was one of the few single time trial events on the 2014 women's cycling calendar and was the last test before the time trial at the 2014 UCI Road World Championships.

Halfway the 33.40 kilometres (20.8 miles) time trial Ellen van Dijk had a 39 seconds advantage over Hanna Solovey, but Van Dijk finished second 8 seconds behind her because she lost about a minute after riding the wrong direction.

== Results ==
	Cyclist	Team	Time
1	Hanna Solovey (UKR)	Ukraine (National team)	45' 27"
2	Ellen van Dijk (NED)	Netherlands (National team)	+ 8"
3	Shara Gillow (AUS)	Australia (National team)	+ 28"
4	Ann-Sophie Duyck (BEL)	Belgium (National team)	+ 30"
5	Alison Tetrick (USA)	Astana BePink	+ 38"
6	Audrey Cordon (FRA)	Team Hitec Products	+ 1' 21"
7	Elisa Longo Borghini (ITA)	Team Hitec Products	+ 1' 42"
8	Felicity Wardlaw (AUS)	Australia (National team)	+ 2' 01"
9	Cecilie Gotaas Johnsen (NOR)	Team Hitec Products	+ 2' 08"
10	Alexandra Burchenkova (RUS)	Rusvelo	+ 2' 11"
