= 2013 Chrono des Nations (women's race) =

Race details
- Dates: 20 October 2013
- Stages: 1
- Distance: 20.87 km (12.97 mi)
- Winning time: 28' 24"

Results
	Winner	Hanna Solovey (UKR)	
	Second	Alison Tetrick (USA)	(Exergy Twenty16)
	Third	Elisa Longo Borghini (ITA)	(Hitec Products UCK)

The 2013 Chrono des Nations Women's Elite time trial was part of a series of one day time trials held at the end of the 2013 season. The tour has an UCI rating of 1.1. The race was won by the Ukrainian Hanna Solovey.

It was announced that after winning the time trial at the 2013 UCI Road World Championships, world champion Ellen van Dijk would not start in this last time trial of the season.

== Results ==
Result

	Rider	Team	Time
1	Hanna Solovey (UKR)		28' 24"
2	Alison Tetrick (USA)	Exergy Twenty16	+ 43"
3	Elisa Longo Borghini (ITA)	Hitec Products UCK	+ 59"
4	Olga Zabelinskaya (RUS)	RusVelo	+ 1' 01"
5	Edwige Pitel (FRA)	S.C. Michela Fanini Rox	+ 1' 05"
6	Amber Neben (USA)	Pasta Zara–Cogeas	+ 1' 31"
7	Bridie O'Donnell (AUS)		+ 1' 42"
8	Liesbet De Vocht (BEL)	Rabobank-Liv Giant	+ 1' 50"
9	Jutta Stienen (SUI)		+ 2' 01"
10	Julia Shaw (GBR)		+ 2' 02"
