= 2010 European Road Championships – Women's under-23 time trial =

Women's under-23 time trial
2010 European Road Championships
- UEC European Champion jersey

Race details
- Dates: 15 July
- Stages: 1
- Distance: 25.9 km (16.09 mi)
- Winning time: 34' 37"

Results
	Winner	Alexandra Burchenkova (RUS)
	Second	Emilia Fahlin (SWE)
	Third	Katazyna Sosna (LTU)

The Women's under-23 time trial at the 2010 European Road Championships took place on 15 July. The Championships were hosted by the Turkish city of Ankara. The course was 25.9 km long.

Ellen van Dijk, who won in 2008 and 2009, was not able to defend her European title.

== Top 10 Final classification ==
Rank	Rider	Time
1	Alexandra Burchenkova (RUS)	34m 37s
2	Emilia Fahlin (SWE)	+ 11s
3	Katazyna Sosna (LTU)	+ 52s
4	Aksana Papko (BLR)	+ 01m 02s
5	Latoya Brulee (BEL)	+ 01m 07s
6	Lesya Kalytovska (UKR)	+ 01m 43s
7	Larissa Pankova (RUS)	+ 01m 49s
8	Doris Schweizer (SUI)	+ 02m 2000s (decade)
9	Mélodie Lesueur (FRA)	+ 02m 05s
10	Oxana Kozonchuk (RUS)	+ 02m 05s
