= Cycling at the 2015 European Games – Women's individual time trial =

Cycling race

Women's road time trial at the 2015 European Games
- Venue: Baku (25.8 km)
- Date: 18 June
- Competitors: 30 from 24 nations
- Winning time: 32:26.87

Medalists
gold medal	Ellen van Dijk	Netherlands
silver medal	Hanna Solovey	Ukraine
bronze medal	Annemiek van Vleuten	Netherlands

The women's individual time trial cycling event at the 2015 European Games in Baku took place over a distance of 25.8 km on 18 June starting and finishing at Bilgah Beach. The course of the race was quite flat and not very technical with a turning point halfway.

Ellen van Dijk from the Netherlands won the time trial with force majeure ahead of Hanna Solovey from Ukraine and Annemiek van Vleuten from the Netherlands.

== Race ==
In the morning of the competition it was sunny with a very strong wind. Because the wind was stronger than the days before, Ellen van Dijk chose another wheel for her bike before the start.

The first rider started at 10:00 with one minute between every rider. For a long time the intermediate and final times of Annemiek van Vleuten from the Netherlands, who started early in the competition, were the fastest times. The intermediate time of Hanna Solovey from Ukraine was seven seconds faster than Van Vleuten. A bit later Ellen van Dijk from the Netherlands, the main favorite who started last, was 14 seconds faster than Solovey. On the finish line the Russian Tatiana Antoshina finished just a few seconds slower than Van Vleuten. Solovey was on the finish about half a minute faster than Van Vleuten and Van Dijk was subsequently half a minute faster than Solovey. Ellen van Dijk was very pleased with her win: "It is the first European Games and that is quite special. This was a race I have been preparing for, for a long time. I have been training at high altitude. I wanted to be very strong in this period and that worked out great. It was very tough today, especially with the wind, but then again it's the same circumstances for everyone. I was able to get into a rhythm quickly and I could keep up the pace. This is what I can do, but it didn't feel particularly great on this course. It's hard to concentrate when it's only one straight road ahead. There's not much to do while riding. You just have to push and push."

== Results ==
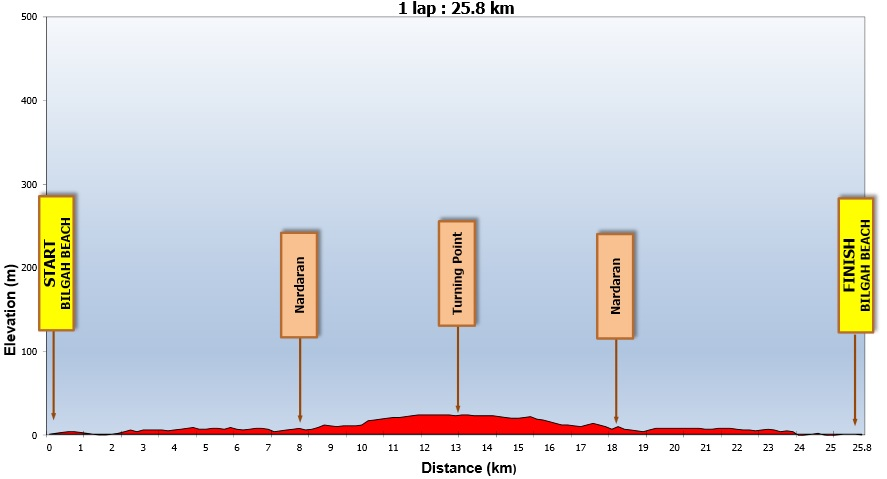
Course of the time trial

Rank	Rider	Nation	Time	Behind
1st place, gold medalist(s)	Ellen van Dijk	Netherlands	32:26.87	
2nd place, silver medalist(s)	Hanna Solovey	Ukraine	33:03.37	+36.50
3rd place, bronze medalist(s)	Annemiek van Vleuten	Netherlands	33:33.56	+1:06.69
4	Tatiana Antoshina	Russia	33:38.73	+1:11.86
5	Martina Ritter	Austria	33:51.77	+1:24.90
6	Olena Pavlukhina	Azerbaijan	33:57.45	+1:30.58
7	Ann-Sophie Duyck	Belgium	34:05.21	+1:38.34
8	Alena Amialiusik	Belarus	34:07.32	+1:40.45
9	Eugenia Bujak	Poland	34:38.82	+2:11.95
10	Camilla Møllebro	Denmark	34:50.63	+2:23.76
11	Tatsiana Sharakova	Belarus	35:03.41	+2:36.54
12	Dana Rožlapa	Latvia	35:18.39	+2:51.52
13	Sari Saarelainen	Finland	35:21.73	+2:54.86
14	Mia Radotić	Croatia	35:27.80	+3:00.93
15	Caroline Ryan	Ireland	35:29.55	+3:02.68
16	Polona Batagelj	Slovenia	35:33.69	+3:06.82
17	Annabelle Dreville	France	35:33.97	+3:07.10
18	Aušrinė Trebaitė	Lithuania	35:38.19	+3:11.32
19	Cecilie Gotaas Johnsen	Norway	35:57.58	+3:30.71
20	Anna Plichta	Poland	36:00.51	+3:33.64
21	Natalia Boyarskaya	Russia	36:06.34	+3:39.47
22	Sheyla Gutiérrez Ruiz	Spain	36:14.28	+3:47.41
23	Tatiana Guderzo	Italy	36:18.25	+3:51.38
24	Liisi Rist	Estonia	36:21.96	+3:55.09
25	Rossella Ratto	Italy	36:22.26	+3:55.39
26	Varvara Fasoi	Greece	36:24.82	+3:57.95
27	Zuzana Neckářová	Czech Republic	36:42.48	+4:15.61
28	Séverine Eraud	France	36:45.99	+4:19.12
29	Tereza Medveďová	Slovakia	39:06.78	+6:39.91
30	Ayşenur Turgut	Turkey	41:53.64	+9:26.77
