= Emilia Fahlin =

Swedish road racing cyclist

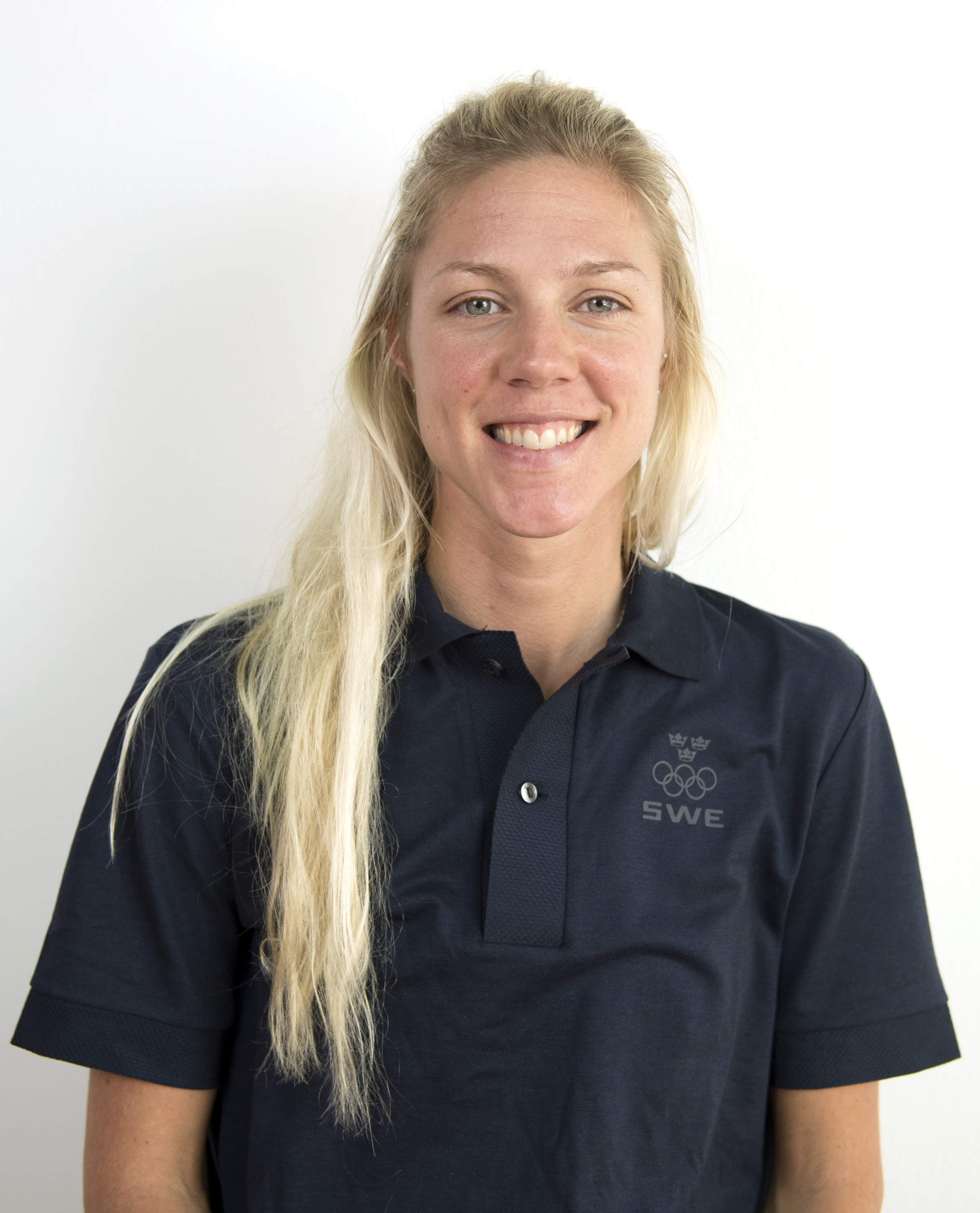
- Fahlin in November 2015

Personal information
- Full name: Emilia Fahlin
- Born: 24 October 1988 (age 37) Örebro, Sweden
- Height: 1.76 m (5 ft 9 in)
- Weight: 63 kg (139 lb)

Cycling career
- Sport: Cycling
- Discipline: Road
- Role: Rider (retired)

Professional teams
- 2007–2012: Team T-Mobile Women
- 2013: Team Hitec Products
- 2014–2015: Wiggle–Honda
- 2016: Alé–Cipollini
- 2017–2018: Wiggle High5
- 2019–2023: FDJ Nouvelle-Aquitaine Futuroscope
- 2024–2025: Arkéa–B&B Hotels Women

Major wins
- UCI Women's World Tour Open de Suède Vårgårda (2016) One day race wins National Road Race Championships (2008, 2013, 2018, 2023) National Time Trial Championships (2009–2011)

Emilia Fahlin (born 24 October 1988) is a Swedish former professional road racing cyclist, who last rode for UCI Women's Continental Team Arkéa–B&B Hotels Women. Fahlin has won the Swedish National Road Race Championships four times (2008, 2013, 2018, 2023) and the Swedish National Time Trial Championships three times in a row from 2009 to 2011.

== Career ==
Born in Örebro, Sweden, Fahlin competed at the 2012 Summer Olympics in London during the women's road race, finishing 19th, and in the women's time trial, finishing 17th. At the 2016 Summer Olympics in Rio de Janeiro, she finished 27th in the Women's road race. Two weeks later, in late-August 2016, she won her first World Tour race, the Open de Suède Vårgårda in Sweden.

In June 2019, Fahlin announced that she would be taking a break from racing to recover from injuries sustained in a training crash. She returned in September to place 15th in the 2019 UCI World Championships Road Race.

After a 2025 season in which she made her debut at the Tour de France Femmes (finishing as the lanterne rouge), Fahlin announced her retirement following a diagnosis of iliac artery endofibrosis.

== Major results ==
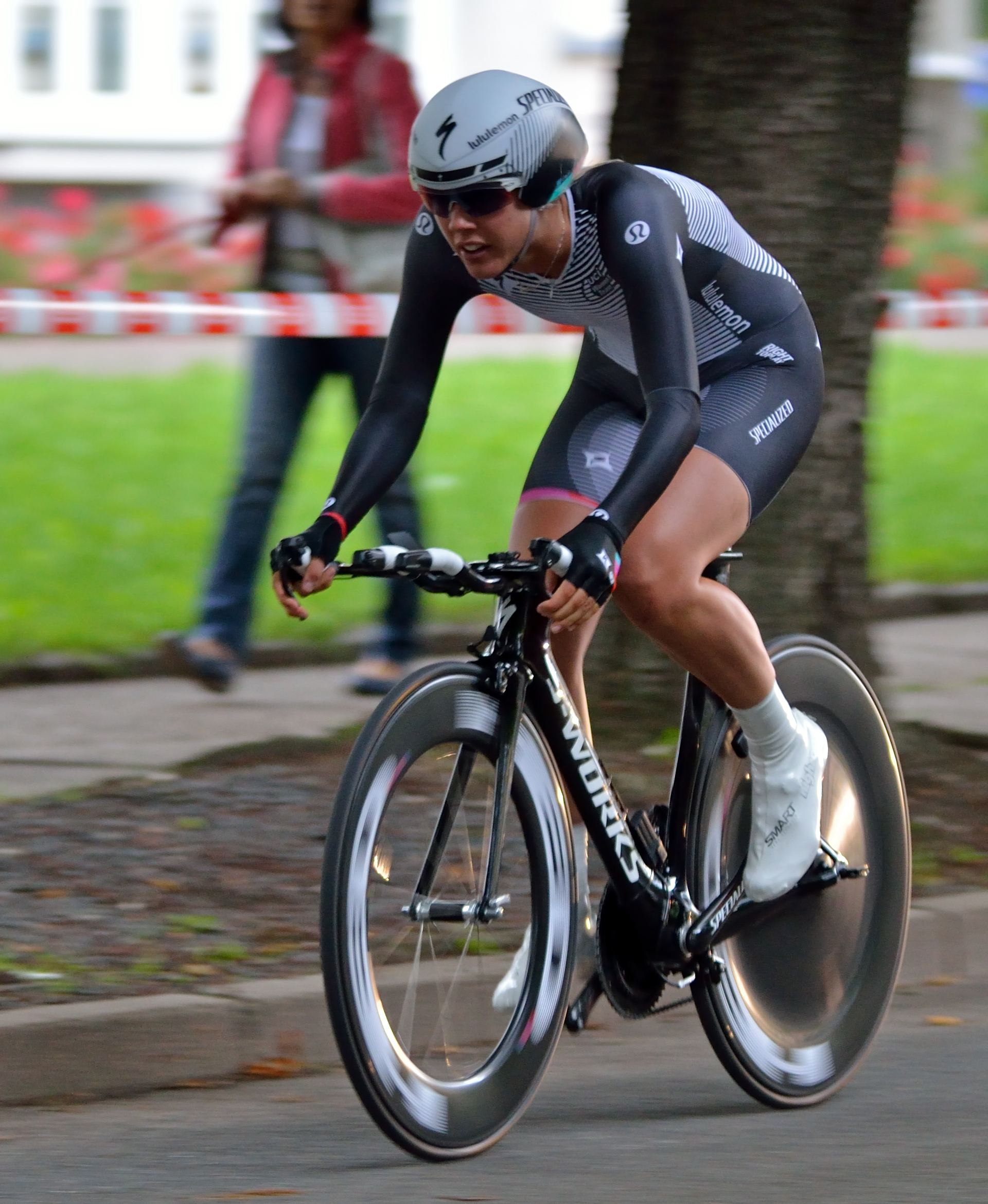
Fahlin, riding for Team Specialized–lululemon, during the Women's Tour of Thuringia 2012 in Zwickau, Germany.

2005
National Junior Road Championships

1st Road race
2nd Time trial

2006
3rd Road race, National Junior Championships
2007
1st Skandisloppet
2008
1st Road race, National Road Championships
1st Overall Svanesunds 3-dagars

1st Stages 1, 2 & 4

1st Stage 3 Redlands Bicycle Classic
1st Stage 1 (TTT) Giro della Toscana Int. Femminile
10th Overall Tour de Pologne Feminin
2009
1st Time trial, National Road Championships
1st Tour of California Women's Criterium
2nd Time trial, UEC European Under-23 Road Championships
7th Prijs Stad Roeselare
2010
National Road Championships

1st Time trial

1st Stage 1 (TTT) Giro della Toscana Int. Femminile
2nd Time trial, UEC European Under-23 Road Championships
8th GP Mameranus
9th Chrono Gatineau
9th Chrono Champenois – Trophée Européen
9th UCI Road World Championships – Women's time trial
10th Overall Profile Ladies Tour

1st Young rider classification

2011
National Road Championships

1st Time trial
3rd Road race

Tour Cycliste Féminin International de l'Ardèche

1st Prologue, Stages 2, 5 & 6

9th UCI Road World Championships – Women's time trial
2012
1st Stage 4b Energiewacht Tour
1st Nederhasselt
National Road Championships

2nd Road race
3rd Time trial

2013
National Road Championships

1st Road race
5th Time trial

9th Grand Prix de Dottignies
2014
National Road Championships

4th Road race
4th Time trial

2015
4th Team time trial, UCI Road World Championships
2016
1st Open de Suède Vårgårda
2017
4th Overall BeNe Ladies Tour
5th Crescent Vårgårda Team Time Trial
8th Crescent Vårgårda Road Race
9th Road race, UCI Road World Championships
10th Road race, UEC European Road Championships
2018
National Road Championships

1st Road race
2nd Time trial

1st Overall Gracia–Orlová

1st Points classification
1st Stages 1, 2 & 4

2nd Overall Ladies Tour of Norway
UCI Road World Championships
4th Road race
4th Team time trial
4th Overall Belgium Tour
5th Open de Suède Vårgårda TTT
6th Overall Madrid Challenge by La Vuelta
7th Ladies Tour of Norway (TTT)
2019
5th Overall Festival Elsy Jacobs
7th Trofeo Alfredo Binda
8th Three Days of Bruges–De Panne
9th Tour of Guangxi Women's WorldTour
9th Grand Prix International d'Isbergues
2020
National Road Championships

2nd Road race
3rd Time trial

4th Omloop van het Hageland
5th Brabantse Pijl
7th La Course by Le Tour de France
2021
5th Overall Thüringen Ladies Tour
5th Road race, National Road Championships
6th Gent–Wevelgem
7th Clasica Femenina Navarra
8th Brabantse Pijl
9th Trofeo Alfredo Binda
2022
2nd Road race, National Road Championships
8th Road race, European Road Championships
8th Grand Prix du Morbihan Féminin
9th Postnord Vårgårda WestSweden
2023
National Road Championships

1st Road race
3rd Time trial

3rd Overall Gracia–Orlová
10th Tour of Guangxi
2024
7th Ronde de Mouscron
2025
8th Ronde de Mouscron
