= 2013 Tour of Zhoushan Island =

Race details
- Dates: 16–18 May 2013
- Stages: 3

Results
	Winner	Giorgia Bronzini (ITA)	(Wiggle High5)
	Second	Elisa Longo Borghini (ITA)	(Hitec Products UCK)
	Third	Cecilie Gotaas Johnsen (NOR)	(Hitec Products UCK)
	Points	Cecilie Gotaas Johnsen (NOR)	(Hitec Products UCK)
	Mountains	Cecilie Gotaas Johnsen (NOR)	(Hitec Products UCK)

The 2013 Tour of Zhoushan Island was a women's cycle stage race held in China from 16 to 18 May 2013. The tour has an UCI rating of 2.2. The race was eventually won by Giorgia Bronzini, marking Wiggle High5 first general classification victory.

== Stages ==
=== Stage 1 ===
16 May Shengsi to Shengsi

Stage 1 result

	Rider	Team	Time
1	Giorgia Bronzini (ITA)	Wiggle High5	2h 10' 58"
2	Elisa Longo Borghini (ITA)	Hitec Products UCK	s.t.
3	Ting Ying Huang (TAI)		+ 1' 12"
4	Oxana Kozonchuk (RUS)	RusVelo	+ 1' 12"
5	Elena Kuchinskaya (RUS)	RusVelo	+ 1' 12"

General classification after stage 1

	Rider	Team	Time
1	Giorgia Bronzini (ITA)	Wiggle High5	2h 10' 48"
2	Elisa Longo Borghini (ITA)	Hitec Products UCK	+ 4"
3	Ting Ying Huang (TAI)		+ 1' 18"
4	Oxana Kozonchuk (RUS)	RusVelo	+ 1' 20"
5	Elena Kuchinskaya (RUS)	RusVelo	+ 1' 20"

=== Stage 2 ===
17 May Daishan to Daishan

Stage 2 result

	Rider	Team	Time
1	Cecilie Gotaas Johnsen (NOR)	Hitec Products UCK	2h 34' 33"
2	Giorgia Bronzini (ITA)	Wiggle High5	s.t.
3	Ting Ying Huang (TAI)		s.t.
4	Mei Yu Hsiao (TAI)		s.t.
5	Oxana Kozonchuk (RUS)	RusVelo	s.t.

General classification after stage 2

	Rider	Team	Time
1	Giorgia Bronzini (ITA)	Wiggle High5	4h 45' 14"
2	Elisa Longo Borghini (ITA)	Hitec Products UCK	+ 11"
3	Ting Ying Huang (TAI)		+ 1' 21"
4	Oxana Kozonchuk (RUS)	RusVelo	+ 1' 24"
5	Elena Kuchinskaya (RUS)	RusVelo	+ 1' 27"

=== Stage 3 ===
18 May Zhujiajian to Zhujiajian

Stage 3 result

	Rider	Team	Time
1	Cecilie Gotaas Johnsen (NOR)	Hitec Products UCK	2h 06' 46"
2	Elena Kuchinskaya (RUS)	RusVelo	+ 4"
3	Lang Meng (CHN)	China Chongming–Giant Pro Cycling	+ 16"
4	Giorgia Bronzini (ITA)	Wiggle High5	+ 16"
5	Elisa Longo Borghini (ITA)	Hitec Products UCK	+ 16"

Final General classification after stage 3

	Rider	Team	Time
1	Giorgia Bronzini (ITA)	Wiggle High5	6h 52' 13"
2	Elisa Longo Borghini (ITA)	Hitec Products UCK	+ 14"
3	Cecilie Gotaas Johnsen (NOR)	Hitec Products UCK	+ 1' 06"
4	Elena Kuchinskaya (RUS)	RusVelo	+ 1' 12"
5	Lang Meng (CHN)	China Chongming–Giant Pro Cycling	+ 1' 28"

== Classification leadership ==
Stage	Winner	General classification	Points classification	Mountains classification
1	Giorgia Bronzini	Giorgia Bronzini	Giorgia Bronzini	Cecilie Gotaas Johnsen
2	Cecilie Gotaas Johnsen	Giorgia Bronzini	Cecilie Gotaas Johnsen	Cecilie Gotaas Johnsen
3	Cecilie Gotaas Johnsen	Giorgia Bronzini	Cecilie Gotaas Johnsen	Cecilie Gotaas Johnsen
Final		Giorgia Bronzini	Cecilie Gotaas Johnsen	Cecilie Gotaas Johnsen
