= Reidar Raaen =

Norwegian cyclist

Personal information
- Born: 15 April 1897 Trondheim, Norway
- Died: 5 April 1964 (aged 66) Trondheim, Norway

Cycling career
- Sport: Cycling

Reidar Raaen (15 April 1897 – 5 April 1964) was a Norwegian cyclist. He won the Norwegian National Time Trial Championships in 1924. He also competed in the individual road race at the 1928 Summer Olympics.
