= Per Digerud =

Norwegian cyclist

Personal information
- Born: 25 July 1933; Oslo, Norway
- Died: 13 August 1988 (aged 55); Oslo, Norway

Sport
- Sport: Cycling; Boxing
- Club: SK Rye (cycling); SK av 1909 (boxing)

Per Digerud (25 July 1933 – 13 August 1988) was a Norwegian cyclist and boxer. He won several national titles in cycling, and one title in boxing, and represented Norway at the 1960 Summer Olympics.

== Life and career ==
Digerud was born in Oslo on 25 July 1933, and was the father of Geir Digerud.

=== Cycling career ===
He competed at the 1960 Summer Olympics in the individual road race. He finished in 71st place. He won the Norwegian National Road Race Championship in 1960, 1961 and 1964. He also won the National Timetrial Championship 1955 (30 km), 1957, 1958, 1961 and 1962 (50 km), 1956 (100 km) a total of nine individual national titles in road championships. He also won gold medals in the National Team-Timetrial Championship in 1955 (30 km), 1957, 1958, 1962 (50 km), 1953, 1955, 1956 (100 km), 1954, 1955, 1956, 1960, 1961, 1962 (170 km).

He received the Kongepokal trophy five times, in 1955, 1956, 1958, 1961 and 1962. He represented the club SK Rye.

=== Boxing career ===
He also won a national title in boxing in 1955, in light middleweight. He represented the club SK av 1909.

== Death ==
Digerud died in Oslo on 13 August 1988, at the age of 55.
