= Alison Tetrick =

American cyclist

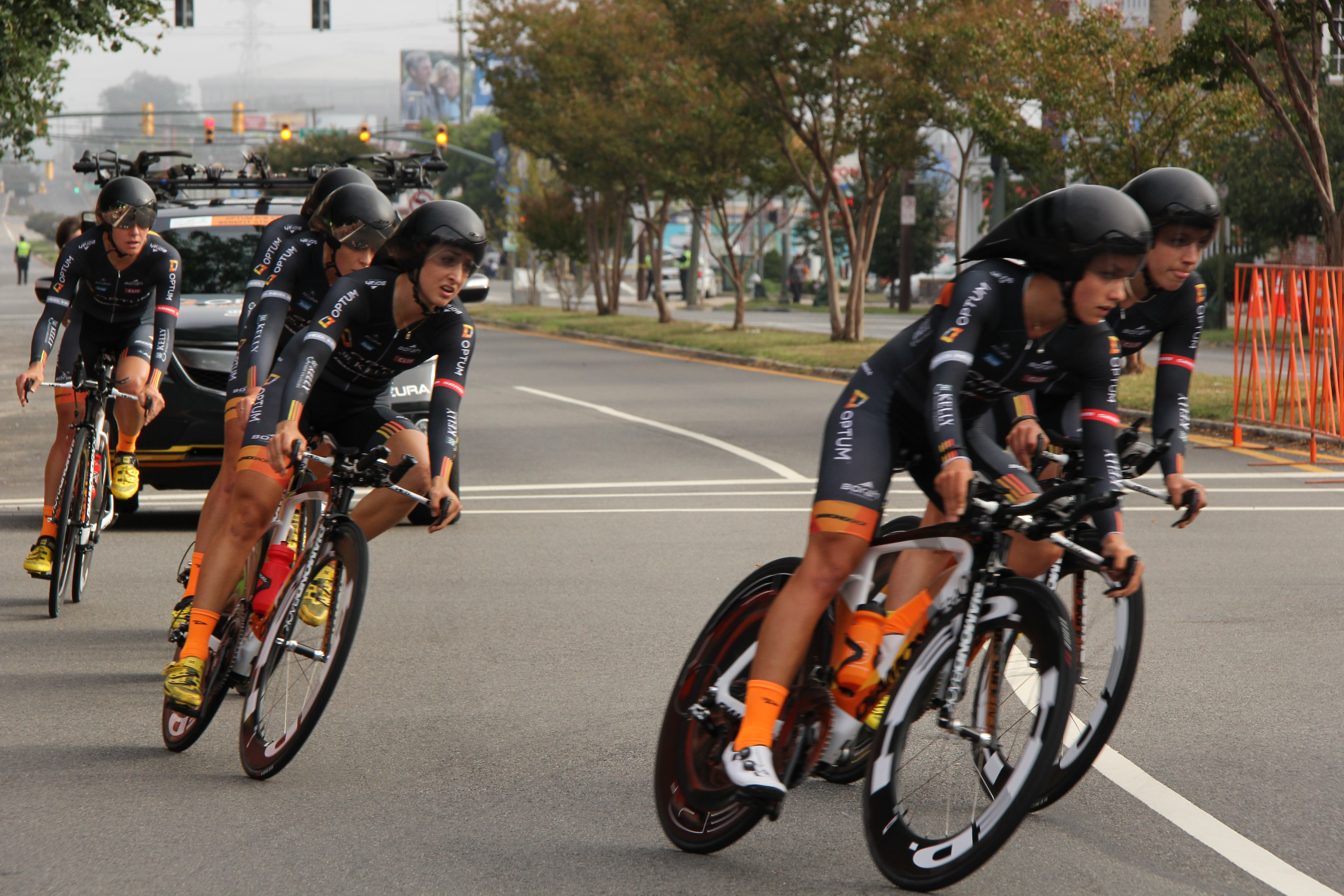
- The Optum–KBS team at the 2015 UCI Road World Championships

Personal information
- Full name: Alison Marie Tetrick
- Born: April 4, 1985 (age 41) Solvang, California, United States
- Height: 5 ft 9 in (175 cm)
- Weight: 143 lb (65 kg)

Cycling career
- Sport: Cycling
- Disciplines: Road; Mountain biking
- Role: Rider

Professional teams
- 2009–2010: Team Tibco
- 2011–2013: Twenty12
- 2014: Astana BePink Women Team
- 2015: Optum–KBS
- 2016–2017: Cylance Pro Cycling

Alison Marie Tetrick (born April 4, 1985) is an American racing cyclist. She rode at the 2014 UCI Road World Championships.

Tetrick comes from a sporting family – her grandfather, Paul Tetrick, won more than a dozen national time trial titles, whilst her father played American football for UCLA and subsequently competed in mountain biking. Alison competed as a tennis player whilst at college, becoming an All-American, before she took up elite competition in triathlon as an amateur after graduating. She switched to cycling after attending a USA Cycling Talent ID camp in 2008. In November 2015 she was announced as part of the inaugural squad for the Cylance Pro Cycling team for the 2016 season.

In 2017 she won Unbound Gravel in Kansas, a race billed as one of the world's top ranked gravel races. She also finished on the podium of the events in 2018 and 2019, even though she had retired as a pro cyclist and no longer rode with a pro team. In 2020, it was cancelled due to COVID-19, but she entered it again in 2021 and placed just outside the top 10. She entered the race again in 2022 as a pacer for other riders.

== Major results ==
2010
3rd Chrono Gatineau
2011
5th Time trial, Pan American Games
2012
2nd Chrono des Nations
2013
2nd Chrono des Nations
2014
2nd Chrono des Nations
3rd Team time trial, UCI Road World Championships
5th Chrono Champenois-Trophée Européen
2015
4th Overall BeNe Ladies Tour

1st Stage 3

5th Overall Tour Femenino de San Luis

1st Stage 6

5th Overall San Dimas Stage Race
