= Geir Digerud =

Norwegian cyclist

Personal information
- Born: 19 May 1956 (age 70) Oslo, Norway

Cycling career
- Sport: Cycling
- Discipline: Road

Professional teams
- 1980–1981: Magniflex–Olmo
- 1982–1983: Atala

Geir Digerud (born 19 May 1956) is a Norwegian former professional cyclist.

He was born in Oslo, and is the son of Per Digerud. He competed at the 1976 Summer Olympics in Montreal, where he placed 55th in the road race and eighth in team time trial with the Norwegian team. He won a bronze medal in team time trial at the 1979 UCI Road World Championships.

He won the Norwegian National Road Race Championship in 1977, 1978 and 1979, and represented the clubs Birkenes IL and SK Rye. He also won the 1980 Tour of Austria.
