= May Britt Hartwell =

Norwegian cyclist

May Britt Våland (born 8 Aug 1968 in Sola Municipality) is a former Norwegian cyclist.

She competed in track cycling at the 1996 Summer Olympics and won the Norwegian National Time Trial Championships four times (1989, 1990, 1994 and 1995). Våland was married to the American cyclist Erin Hartwell.
