= Mélodie Lesueur =

French cyclist

Personal information
- Born: 12 March 1990 (age 36) Beauvais, France

Cycling career
- Sport: Cycling
- Current team: CSM Puteaux
- Discipline: Road
- Role: Rider

Amateur teams
- 2011: ESGL 93
- 2013: Île-de-France
- 2016: DN 17 Poitou-Charentes
- 2017–: CSM Puteaux

Professional teams
- 2009–2010: Specialized Mazda Samson
- 2014: Lointek

Major wins
- One-day races and Classics European Under-23 Time Trial Championships (2011) National Road Race Championships (2010)
Medal record
Representing France
Women's road cycling
European Road Championships
Gold medal – first place	2011 Offida	Under-23 time trial

Mélodie Lesueur (born 12 March 1990) is a French road racing cyclist, who currently rides for French amateur team CSM Puteaux. Lesueur won the French National Road Race Championships in 2010 and became European champion in the under-23 individual time trial at the 2011 European Road Championships.

== Major results ==
2009
4th Chrono des Nations
6th Time trial, UEC European Under-23 Road Championships
8th Overall La Route de France
2010
1st Road race, National Road Championships
7th Chrono des Nations
9th Time trial, UEC European Under-23 Road Championships
2011
1st Time trial, UEC European Under-23 Road Championships
9th Chrono des Nations
10th Cholet Pays de Loire Dames
2012
7th Chrono des Nations
10th Time trial, UEC European Under-23 Road Championships
2013
3rd Time trial, National Road Championships
8th Road race, Jeux de la Francophonie
2014
2nd Road race, National Road Championships
3rd Chrono des Nations
10th Overall Tour Cycliste Féminin International de l'Ardèche
