= Zuzana Neckářová =

Czech cyclist

Personal information
- Born: 29 June 1984 (age 42) Kraslice, Czechoslovakia

Cycling career
- Sport: Cycling
- Discipline: Road
- Role: Rider

Zuzana Neckářová (born 29 June 1984) is a Czech professional racing cyclist. Neckářová represented her country in the time trial at the 2015 European Games in Baku, Azerbaijan. Having finished second in the Czech National Road Race Championships, she also rode in the women's road race at the 2015 UCI Road World Championships.
