= Oxana Kozonchuk =

Russian cyclist (born 1988)

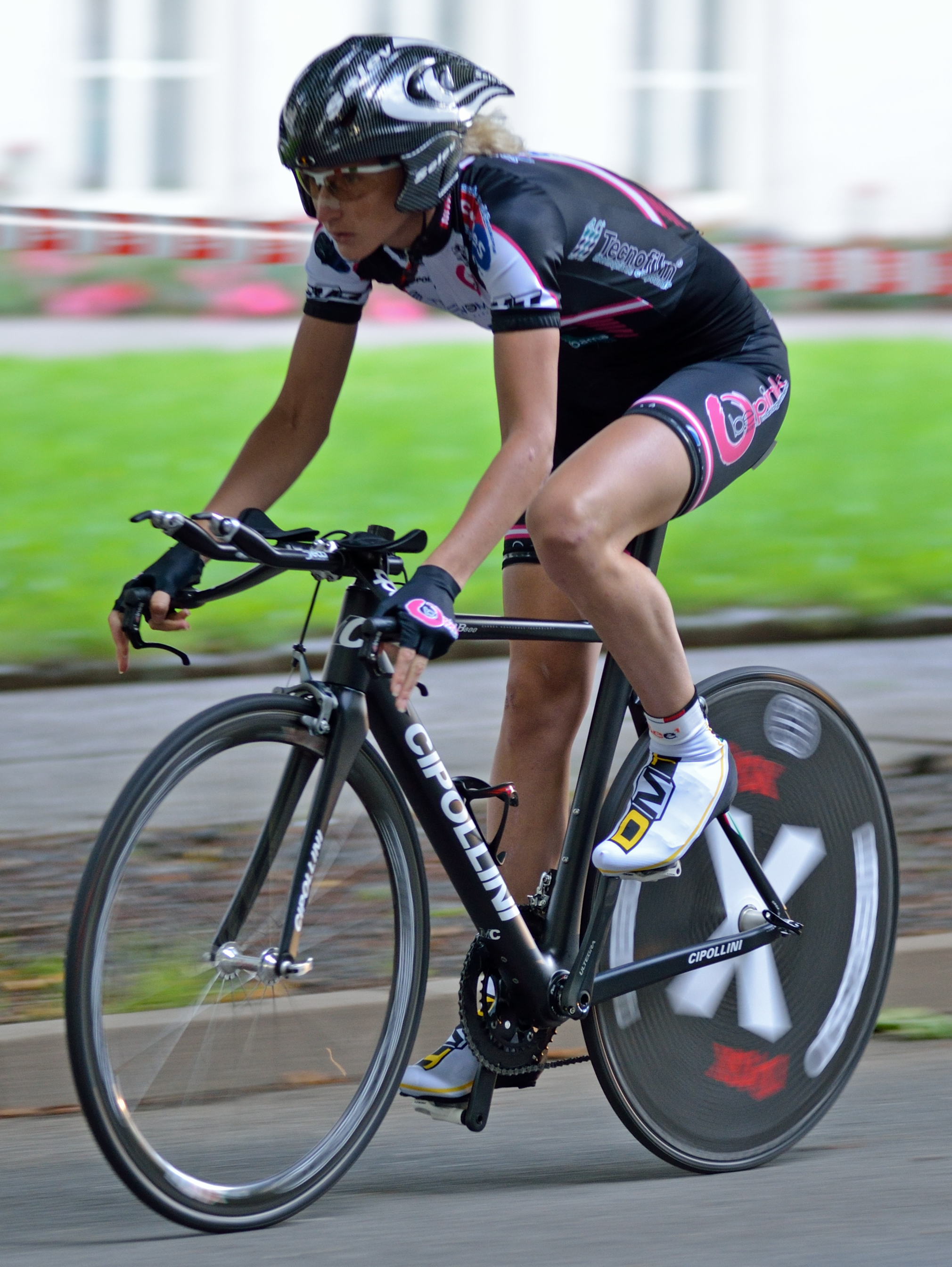
- Kozonchuk in 2012

Personal information
- Born: 28 May 1988 (age 38) Russia

Cycling career
- Sport: Cycling
- Current team: Retired
- Discipline: Road
- Role: Rider

Professional teams
- 2007–2009: Menikini–Selle Italia–Gysko
- 2010–2011: Safi–Pasta Zara
- 2012: Be Pink
- 2013–2014: RusVelo Women's Team
- 2016: Lensworld–Zannata

Oxana Kozonchuk (born 28 May 1988) is a Russian former professional racing cyclist.

== Major results ==
2008
3rd Team pursuit, UEC European Under-23 Track Championships (with Maria Mishina, Evgenia Romanyuta and Victoria Kondel)
7th Road race, UEC European Under-23 Road Championships
7th GP de Plouay – Bretagne
9th Drentse 8 van Dwingeloo
2010
UEC European Under-23 Road Championships

6th Road race
10th Time trial

9th GP Ciudad de Valladolid
10th Overall Iurreta-Emakumeen Bira
2012
2nd Grand Prix of Maykop
6th Memorial Davide Fardelli
7th GP Liberazione
2013
2nd Road race, National Road Championships
4th Overall Tour de Bretagne Féminin

1st Points classification
1st Stage 1

4th Overall Tour Féminin en Limousin

1st Stage 1

6th Overall Tour of Zhoushan Island
6th EPZ Omloop van Borsele
Tour of Chongming Island

7th Overall Stage race
9th World Cup

10th Chrono Champenois
2015
6th Grand Prix of Maykop
9th Overall Tour of Zhoushan Island
2016
3rd Road race, National Road Championships
