= 2001 Holland Ladies Tour =

Race details
- Dates: September 2–7
- Stages: 6
- Distance: 682 km (424 mi)
- Winning time: 16h 57' 50"

Results
Jersey awarded to the overall winner	Winner	Petra Rossner (GER)	(Saturn Cycling Team)
	Second	Diana Žiliūtė (LTU)	(Acca Due O)
	Third	Debby Mansveld (NED)	(Vlaanderen T-Interim)
Jersey awarded to the points classification winner	Points	Petra Rossner (GER)	(Saturn Cycling Team)
Jersey awarded to the mountains classification winner	Mountains	Arenda Grimberg (NED)	(Acca Due O)
Jersey awarded to the young rider classification winner	Young rider	Ine Wannijn (BEL)	(Belgian National Team)
Jersey awarded to the sprints classification winner	Sprints	Debby Mansveld (NED)	(Vlaanderen T-Interim)
	Team	Acca Due O	

The 4th edition of the annual Holland Ladies Tour was held from September 2 to September 7, 2001 in Dronten.

== Stages ==
=== 2001-09-02: Dronten – Dronten (140 km) ===
Place	Stage 1		General classification	
Place	Name	Time	Name	Time
1.	Leontien van Moorsel (NED)	03:21.05	Leontien van Moorsel (NED)	03:20.55
2.	Diana Žiliūtė (LTU)	—	Diana Žiliūtė (LTU)	+0.01
3.	Debby Mansveld (NED)	—	Debby Mansveld (NED)	+0.03

=== 2001-09-03: Leiden – Leiden (116 km) ===
Place	Stage 2		General classification	
Place	Name	Time	Name	Time
1.	Petra Rossner (GER)	02:47.16	Petra Rossner (GER)	06:08.04
2.	Debby Mansveld (NED)	—	Debby Mansveld (NED)	+0.01
3.	Leontien van Moorsel (NED)	—	Leontien van Moorsel (NED)	+0.02

=== 2001-09-04: Oss – Oss (106 km) ===
Place	Stage 3		General classification	
Place	Name	Time	Name	Time
1.	Bettina Schöke (GER)	02:44.33	Petra Rossner (GER)	08:55.25
2.	Wenche Stensvold (NOR)	—	Debby Mansveld (NED)	+0.01
3.	Petra Rossner (GER)	+2.52	Diana Žiliūtė (LTU)	+0.08

=== 2001-09-05: Haaften – Haaften (125 km) ===
Place	Stage 4		General classification	
Place	Name	Time	Name	Time
1.	Petra Rossner (GER)	03:00.57	Petra Rossner (GER)	11:56.06
2.	Debby Mansveld (NED)	—	Debby Mansveld (NED)	+0.09
3.	Yvonne Brunen (NED)	—	Diana Žiliūtė (LTU)	+0.20

=== 2001-09-06: Bergeijk – Bergeijk (85 km) ===
Place	Stage 5-A		General classification	
Place	Name	Time	Name	Time
1.	Petra Rossner (GER)	02:06.44	Petra Rossner (GER)	14:02.41
2.	Anna Millward (AUS)	—	Debby Mansveld (NED)	+0.14
3.	Debby Mansveld (NED)	—	Diana Žiliūtė (LTU)	+0.29

=== 2001-09-06: Bergeijk – Bergeijk (27 km) ===
Place	Stage 5-B (Individual Time Trial)		General classification	
Place	Name	Time	Name	Time
1.	Kirsty Robb (NZL)	00:36.14,21	Petra Rossner (GER)	14:39.02
2.	Petra Rossner (GER)	+0.07,54	Anna Millward (AUS)	+0.55
3.	Mirjam Melchers (NED)	+0.11,71	Diana Žiliūtė (LTU)	+1.28

=== 2001-09-07: Heerlen – Heerlen (83 km) ===
Place	Stage 6		General classification	
Place	Name	Time	Name	Time
1.	Arenda Grimberg (NED)	02:18.54	Petra Rossner (GER)	16:57.50
2.	Petra Rossner (GER)	—	Diana Žiliūtė (LTU)	+2.08
3.	Sissy van Alebeek (NED)	+0.34	Debby Mansveld (NED)	+4.23

== Final standings ==
=== General classification ===
Rank	Name	Team	Time
1.	Petra Rossner (GER)	Saturn Cycling Team	16:57.50
2.	Diana Žiliūtė (LTU)	Acca Due O	+ 2.08
3.	Debby Mansveld (NED)	Vlaanderen T-Interim	+ 4.23
4.	Bettina Schöke (GER)	German National Team	+ 4.33
5.	Arenda Grimberg (NED)	Acca Due O	+ 4.36
6.	Kirsty Robb (NZL)	BIK-Toscany Sport	+ 4.47
7.	Wenche Stensvold (NOR)	Team Sponsorservice	+ 5.31
8.	Anke Wichmann (GER)	German National Team	+ 6.00
9.	Zita Urbonaitė (LTU)	Acca Due O	+ 6.31
10.	Wendie Kramp (NED)	BIK-Toscany Sport	+ 7.19

=== Points classification ===
Rank	Name	Team	Points
1.	Petra Rossner (GER)	Saturn Cycling Team	130
2.	Debby Mansveld (NED)	Vlaanderen T-Interim	87
3.	Diana Žiliūtė (LTU)	Acca Due O	75

=== Mountains classification ===
Rank	Name	Team	Points
1.	Arenda Grimberg (NED)	Acca Due O	36
2.	Debby Mansveld (NED)	Vlaanderen T-Interim	12
3.	Bettina Schöke (GER)	German National Team	9

=== Best young rider classification ===
Rank	Name	Team	Time
1.	Ine Wannijn (BEL)	Belgian National Team	17:06.00
2.	Erika Vilūnaitė (LTU)	Acca Due O	+ 00.11
3.	Bertine Spijkerman (NED)	Team Farm Frites–Hartol	+ 01.47

=== Sprint classification ===
Rank	Name	Team	Points
1.	Debby Mansveld (NED)	Vlaanderen T-Interim	20
2.	Petra Rossner (GER)	Saturn Cycling Team	16
3.	Diana Žiliūtė (LTU)	Acca Due O	11

== Teams ==
- Acca Due O
- Team Farm Frites–Hartol
- Nationale Selectie KNWU
- Saturn Cycling Team
- German National Team
- Belgian National Team
- Vlaanderen T-Interim
- Albertsvrienden
- Team Sponsorservice
- Konica (Czech Rep.)
- Ondernemers van Nature
- Westland Wil Vooruit
- Ton v Bemmelen/Novilon
- Brabant 2000 reg. select
- BIK-Toscany Sport
