= Iver Knotten =

Norwegian cyclist

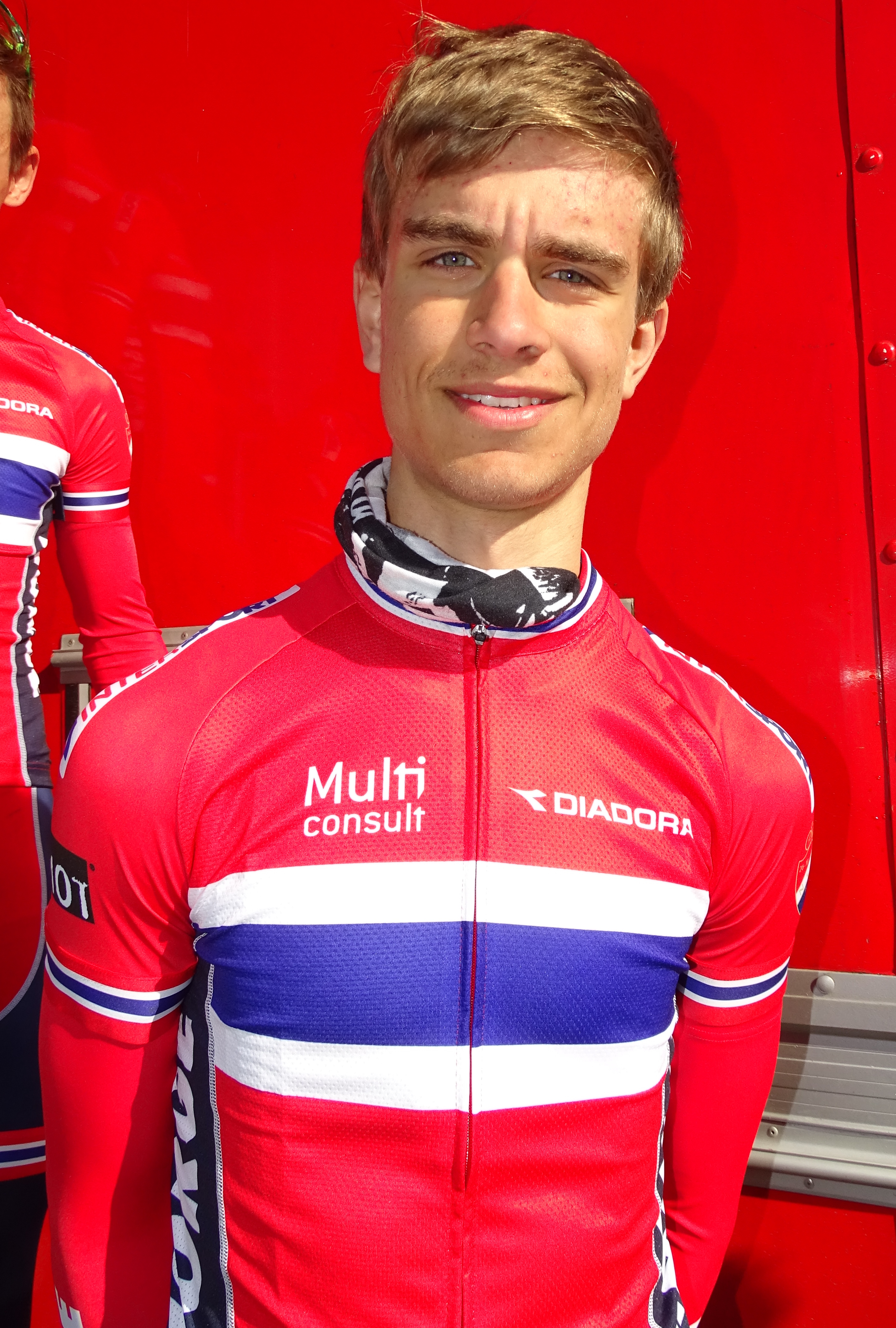
- Knotten at the 2016 Paris–Roubaix Juniors.

Personal information
- Full name: Iver Johan Knotten
- Born: 17 December 1998 (age 27) Ramnes, Norway

Cycling career
- Sport: Cycling
- Current team: EF Education–Nippo Development Team
- Discipline: Road
- Role: Rider
- Rider type: Time trialist

Professional teams
- 2017–2018: Joker Icopal
- 2020: Team Coop
- 2021–: Nippo–Provence–PTS Conti

Iver Johan Knotten (born 17 December 1998) is a Norwegian cyclist, who currently rides for UCI Continental team EF Education–Nippo Development Team. His father, Jon Erik Knotten, was also a cyclist.

== Major results ==
2015
2nd Road race, National Junior Road Championships
2016
1st Time trial, National Junior Road Championships
1st Overall Niedersachsen-Rundfahrt der Junioren

1st Stage 2a (ITT)

3rd Time trial, UEC European Junior Road Championships
6th Time trial, UCI Junior Road World Championships
9th Overall Trophée Centre Morbihan

1st Stage 2 (ITT)

9th Overall Course de la Paix Juniors

1st Stage 2a (ITT)

2019
2nd Time trial, National Road Championships
4th Time trial, European Under-23 Road Championships
2020
4th Time trial, National Road Championships
2023
2nd Time trial, National Road Championships
