= Hanna Solovey =

Ukrainian racing cyclist

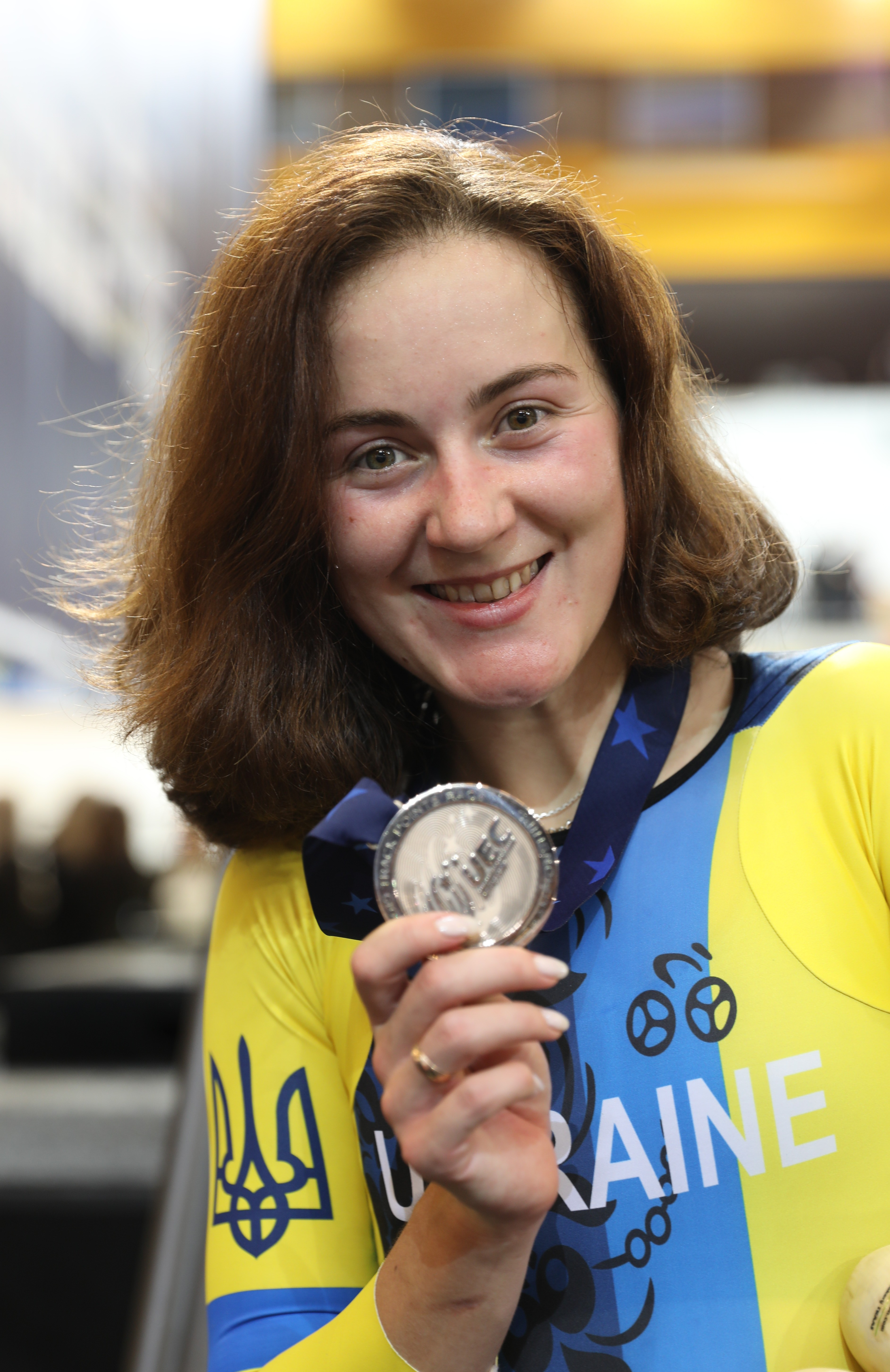
- Solovey in 2019

Personal information
- Full name: Hanna Solovey; Ukrainian: Ганна Соловей
- Born: 31 January 1992 (age 34) Luhansk, Ukraine

Cycling career
- Sport: Cycling
- Disciplines: Road; Track
- Role: Rider
- Rider type: Time-trialist

Amateur teams
- 2011: ISD Track Team
- 2022–: Lviv Cycling Team

Professional teams
- 2010–2011: Ukraine national team
- 2013–2014: Ukraine national team
- 2015: Astana–Acca Due O
- 2016–2018: Parkhotel Valkenburg Continental Team
- 2019: Lviv Cycling Team
- 2021: Lviv Cycling Team
Medal record
Representing Ukraine
Women's road cycling
World Championships
Silver medal – second place	2014 Ponferrada	Time trial
European Games
Silver medal – second place	2015 Baku	Time trial
European Championships
Gold medal – first place	2013 Olomouc	Time trial
Bronze medal – third place	2013 Olomouc	Road race
Women's track cycling
European Games
Gold medal – first place	2019 Minsk	Points race
European Championships
Bronze medal – third place	2019 Apeldoorn	Points race

Hanna Solovey (Ukrainian: Ганна Соловей; born 31 January 1992) is a Ukrainian road and track racing cyclist, who rode for Ukrainian amateur team Lviv Cycling Team.

== Career ==
Born in Luhansk, Solovey was banned in 2011 for 2 years after testing positive for performance-enhancing drug, Drostanolone.

=== Astana–Acca Due O (2015) ===
On 24 December 2014, Solovey signed for Astana–Acca Due O.

In June 2015, Astana–Acca Due O fired Solovey citing "unprofessional behaviour". This was disputed, with the Ukrainian Cycling Federation, claiming she was fired for refusing to take up Kazakhstani citizenship ahead of the Rio 2016 Olympics. Alexander Vinokourov, the Astana manager, rejected the claim. Solovey did not qualify for the 2016 Olympics.

In June 2015, she competed in the inaugural European Games, for Ukraine in cycling. She earned a silver medal in the women's time trial.

== Major results ==
=== Road ===
2009
1st Time trial, UCI Juniors World Championships
2nd Time trial, UEC European Junior Road Championships
2010
UCI Juniors Road World Championships

1st Time trial
4th Road race

1st Time trial, UEC European Junior Road Championships
National Road Championships

1st Time trial
2nd Hill climb
5th Road race

1st Junior Chrono des Nations

Voided results from 1 January 2011 to 31 December 2012.

2011
~~1st Time trial, National Road Championships~~
~~2nd Chrono Gatineau~~

2013
UEC European Under-23 Road Championships

1st Time trial
3rd Road race

1st Chrono des Nations
8th UCI Road World Championships – Women's time trial
2014
1st Chrono Champenois-Trophée Européen
1st Chrono des Nations
2nd UCI Road World Championships – Women's time trial
9th 2014 UCI Road World Championships – Women's road race
2015
National Road Championships

1st Time trial
3rd Road race

European Games

2nd Time trial
10th Road race

2nd Chrono des Nations
4th Chrono Gatineau
8th Strade Bianche
2016
National Road Championships

2nd Time trial
3rd Road race

3rd Horizon Park Women Challenge
3rd VR Women ITT
6th Overall Emakumeen Euskal Bira
7th Overall Auensteiner–Radsporttage
8th Overall Giro della Toscana Int. Femminile – Memorial Michela Fanini
9th Overall Holland Ladies Tour
2017
1st VR Women ITT
National Road Championships

2nd Time trial
6th Road race

3rd Borsele ITT
5th Overall Tour de Feminin-O cenu Českého Švýcarska
9th Overall Tour Cycliste Féminin International de l'Ardèche
2018
3rd Overall Tour of Eftalia Hotels & Velo Alanya
4th VR Women ITT
7th Horizon Park Women Challenge
2019
5th Kievskaya Sotka Women Challenge
7th Overall Gracia–Orlová
7th Chabany Race
2020
5th Grand Prix Gazipaşa
2021
2nd Time trial, National Road Championships
6th Grand Prix Velo Alanya
2022
8th Grand Prix Gazipaşa

=== Track ===
2009
3rd Individual pursuit, UCI Juniors Track World Championships
2010
6th Team pursuit, 2010–11 UCI Track Cycling World Cup Classics, Melbourne
8th Team pursuit, UEC European Track Championships

Voided results from 1 January 2011 to 31 December 2012.

2011
~~8th Team pursuit, UCI Track World Championships~~

2013
National Track Championships

1st Omnium
3rd 500m time trial

1st Omnium, Grand Prix of Poland
Copa Internacional de Pista

1st Individual pursuit
1st Team pursuit
2nd Omnium

2nd Team pursuit, UEC European Under-23 Track Championships
2014
Grand Prix Galychyna

1st Individual pursuit
2nd Omnium
