= List of 2001 UCI Women's Teams =

Listed below are the 2001 UCI Women's Teams that competed in 2001 women's road cycling events organized by the International Cycling Union (UCI).

UCI code	Team Name	Country
ADO	Acca Due O-H.P. Lorena Camicie	Lithuania
ATC	Autotrader.com Cycling Team	United States
BTS	Bik-Toscany Sport	Netherlands
CAM	C.A. Mantes La Ville 78	France
CDI	Carpe Diem-Itera	Russia
CIE	Ciegi Professional Cycling Team	Ukraine
EDI	Edilsavino	Italy
RON	Equipe Cycliste Rona	Canada
NUR	Equipe Nürnberger	Germany
GAS	Gas Sport Team	Italy
RDV	La Rosa Dei Venti	Italy
OND	Ondernemers van Nature	Netherlands
SAT	Saturn Cycling Team	United States
MIC	S.C. Michela Fanini Record Rox	Italy
ALF	Team Alfa Lum R.S.M.	San Marino
ALI	Team Aliverti-Immobiliare Luca	Italy
FAR	Team Farm Frites–Hartol	Netherlands
TLF	Team Lolland-Falster	Denmark
SPO	Team Sponsorservice	Norway
VLA	Vlaanderen-T-Interim Ladies Team	Belgium
