= Stig Kristiansen =

Norwegian cyclist

Personal information
- Born: 12 August 1970 (age 56) Oslo, Norway

Cycling career
- Sport: Cycling

Stig Kristiansen (born 12 August 1970) is a Norwegian former cyclist. He competed in the team time trial at the 1992 Summer Olympics.
