= 2009 European Road Championships – Women's under-23 time trial =

Women's under-23 time trial
2009 European Road Championships

Race details
- Dates: 2009-07-01 in (Belgium) Hooglede-Gits (BEL)
- Stages: 1
- Distance: 28.1 km (17.46 mi)
- Winning time: 36' 41"

Results
	Winner	Ellen van Dijk (NED)	(Netherlands)
	Second	Emilia Fahlin (SWE)	(Sweden)
	Third	Marianne Vos (NED)	(Netherlands)

The Women's under-23 time trial at the 2009 European Road Championships took place on July 1. The Championships were hosted by the Belgian city of Hooglede-Gits. The course was 28.1 km long and had stone sections that were also uphill. The uphill part was seen as an important part of the course where you could easily lose seconds.

Team Columbia-HTC's Dutch women Ellen van Dijk won the U23 women's individual time trial for the second consecutive year. Van Dijk completed the 28-kilometre course in a time of 36:41 (41.1 km/h), beating Swedish Emilia Fahlin, her teammate, by 20 seconds. She was very happy with the result because she suffered a concussion in April and was unable to cycle for almost six weeks, lowering her expectations for success.

== Reactions ==
Ellen van Dijk

"I am very happy, of course, I was very insecure about my fitness, but it seems I was able to succeed today, even after the lost training time. The course was quite long, with a couple of stone sections that were also uphill, and it was very hard near the end. The uphill was at a very important part of the course where you can easily lose a couple of seconds, but the wind was behind me, so that was a bit of help."

== Final classification ==
In the time trial event competed in total 40 athletes.

Rank	Rider	Time
1st place, gold medalist(s)	Ellen van Dijk (NED)	36.41
2nd place, silver medalist(s)	Emilia Fahlin (SWE)	+ 20
3rd place, bronze medalist(s)	Marianne Vos (NED)	+ 24
4	Svitlana Halyuk (UKR)	+ 35
5	Trine Schmidt (DEN)	+ 48
6	Mélodie Lesueur (FRA)	+ 55
7	Valeriya Kononenko (UKR)	+ 1.12
8	Viktoriya Kondel (RUS)	+ 1.32
9	Latoya Brulee (BEL)	+ 1.35
10	Katie Colclough (GBR)	+ 1.18
11	Aušrinė Trebaitė (LTU)	+ 1.34
12	Aleksandra Dawidowicz (POL)	+ 1.35
13	Alexandra Burchenkova (RUS)	+ 1.37
14	Lesya Kalytovska (UKR)	+ 1.40
15	Edita Ungurytė (LTU)	+ 1.40
16	Franziska Merten (GER)	+ 1.51
17	Lisa Brennauer (GER)	+ 1.57
18	Audrey Cordon (FRA)	+ 1.57
19	Alena Amialiusik (BLR)	+ 2.09
20	Kristine Saastad (NOR)	+ 2.18
21	Paulina Gorycka (POL)	+ 2.21
22	Oxana Kozonchuk (RUS)	+ 2.25
23	Andrea Wölfer (SUI)	+ 2.28
24	Emilie Aubry (SUI)	+ 2.30
25	Chantal Blaak (NED)	+ 2.48
26	Isabelle Söderberg (SWE)	+ 2.51
27	Jessie Daams (BEL)	+ 2.52
28	Elise Depoorter (BEL)	+ 3.04
29	Denise Zuckermandel (GER)	+ 3.05
30	Christine Majerus (LUX)	+ 3.14
31	Polona Batagelj (SLO)	+ 3.17
32	Anne-Marie Schmitt (LUX)	+ 3.19
33	Egle Zablockyte (LTU)	+ 3.19
34	Cecilie Johansen (NOR)	+ 3.23
35	Hannah Mayho (GBR)	+ 3.27
36	Hanna Talkanitsa (BLR)	+ 3.31
37	Lucy Martin (GBR)	+ 3.42
38	Aksana Papko (BLR)	+ 3.59
39	Lotta Lepistö (FIN)	+ 5.39
40	Ane Santesteban (ESP)	+ 6.05
