= Tour of Zhoushan Island =

Chinese multi-day road cycling race

Race details
- Date: May
- Region: China
- Discipline: Road
- Type: Stage race

History
- First edition: 2012
- Editions: 8 (as of 2019)
- First winner: Emilie Moberg (NOR)
- Most wins: Charlotte Becker (GER) (2 wins)
- Most recent: Nguyễn Thị Thật (VIE); (Tour of Zhoushan Island I); Thi Thu Mai Nguyễn (VIE); (Tour of Zhoushan Island II)

Tour of Zhoushan Island is a women's staged cycle race which takes place in China and is currently rated by the UCI as 2.2.

== Winners ==
Year	Winner	Second	Third
2012 (I)	Emilie Moberg (NOR)	Jutatip Maneephan (THA)	Meng Zhaojuan (HKG)
2012 (II)	Liu Xiaohui (CHN)	Na Ah-reum (KOR)	Liu Xin (CHN)
2013	Giorgia Bronzini (ITA)	Elisa Longo Borghini (ITA)	Cecilie Gotaas Johnsen (NOR)
2014	Charlotte Becker (GER)	Marta Tagliaferro (ITA)	Aizhan Zhaparova (RUS)
2015	Lauren Kitchen (AUS)	Elena Kuchinskaya (RUS)	Charlotte Becker (GER)
2016	Elena Kuchinskaya (RUS)	Olga Zabelinskaya (RUS)	Nicole Brändli (SUI)
2017	Charlotte Becker (GER)	Anastasiia Iakovenko (RUS)	Emilie Moberg (NOR)
2018	Sheyla Gutiérrez (ESP)	Charlotte Becker (GER)	Elizaveta Oshurkova (RUS)
2019 (I)	Nguyễn Thị Thật (VIE)	Arianna Fidanza (ITA)	Lisa Morzenti (ITA)
2019 (II)	Thi Thu Mai Nguyễn (VIE)	Annamarie Lipp (NZL)	Sun Jiajun (CHN)
No race in 2020 and 2021 due to the COVID-19 pandemic in mainland China
