= Morten Sæther =

Norwegian cyclist

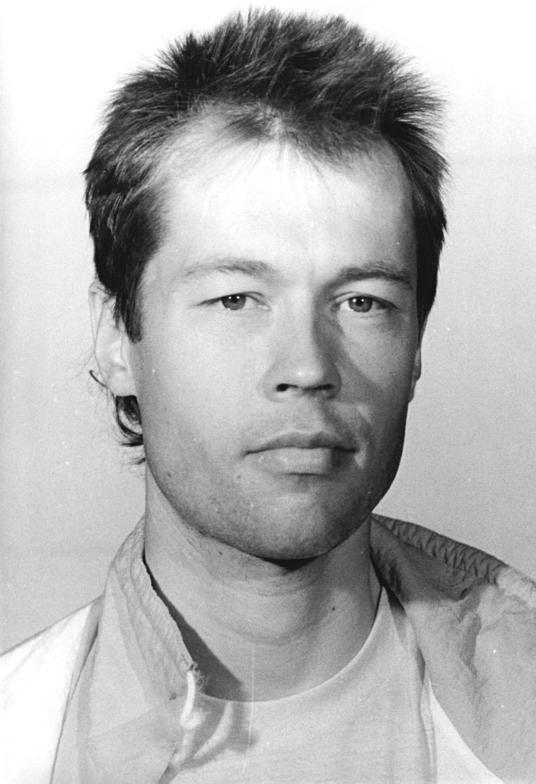
- Morten Sæther in 1987

Personal information
- Born: 13 May 1959 (age 67) Lillehammer, Norway
- Height: 1.91 m (6 ft 3 in)
- Weight: 80 kg (176 lb)

Cycling career
- Sport: Cycling
Medal record
Representing Norway
World championships
Bronze medal – third place	1979 Valkenburg	Team time trial

Morten Sæther (born 13 May 1959) is a Norwegian cyclist. He won a bronze medal at the 1979 UCI Road World Championships in the 100 km team time trial. He missed the 1980 Summer Olympics in Moscow due to their boycott by Norway, but competed at the 1984 Summer Olympics in Los Angeles, where he placed fourth in the individual road race. He won the Tour of Berlin in 1979 and 1983 and finished second in the Tour of Austria and Sealink Race in 1980. He also won the Norwegian National Road Race Championship in 1981 and 1983.

== Personal life ==
Sæther was born in Lillehammer on 13 May 1959.
