= Vita Heine =

Norwegian cyclist (born 1984)

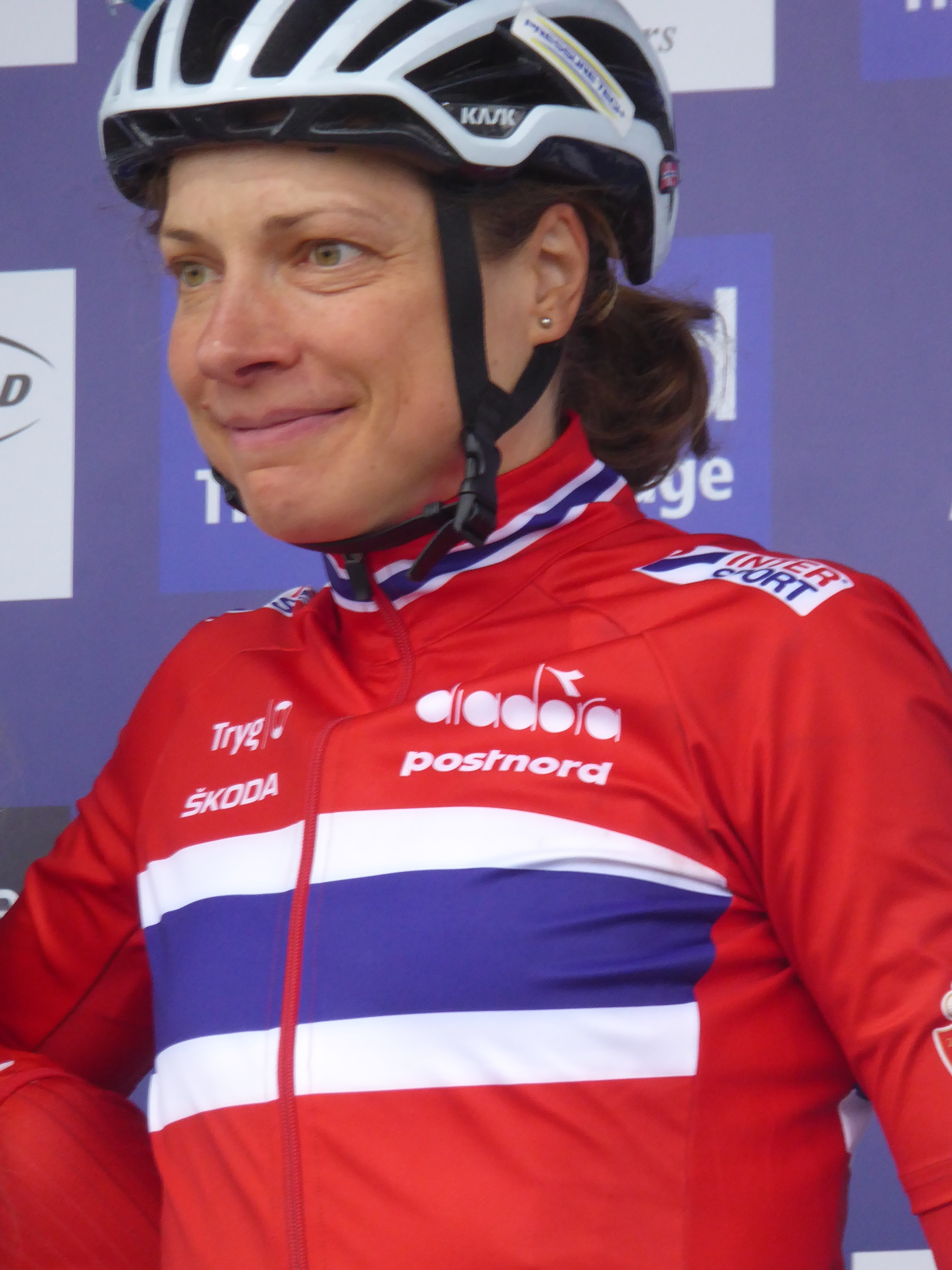
- Heine at the 2019 Women's Tour of Scotland

Personal information
- Full name: Vita Heine
- Born: Vita Pētersone; 21 November 1984 (age 41): Riga, Latvian SSR, Soviet Union; (now Latvia)
- Height: 1.76 m (5 ft 9 1/2 in)

Cycling career
- Sport: Cycling
- Current team: Retired
- Discipline: Road
- Role: Rider

Amateur team
- 2014: Endura Lady Force

Professional teams
- 2014–2020: Team Hitec Products
- 2021: Massi–Tactic

Vita Heine (née Pētersone; born 21 November 1984) is a former racing cyclist, who rode professionally between 2014 and 2021 for UCI Women's Continental Teams Hitec Products–Birk Sport and Massi–Tactic.

During her career, Heine took seventeen victories including seven Norwegian national titles – three victories in the Norwegian National Time Trial Championships (2016, 2017 and 2019), and four victories in the Norwegian National Road Race Championships (2016–2018 and 2021).

== Career ==
Born in Riga in Latvia, Heine competed for Latvia in the 2013 UCI women's road race in Florence. She obtained Norwegian citizenship from 1 July 2014, and joined Norwegian-based Team Hitec Products on 1 September 2014. She remained with the team until the end of the 2020 season, joining Massi–Tactic for 2021.

== Major results ==
2011
3rd Time trial, Latvian National Road Championships (Note: Heine competed under Latvian nationality up until 2014 before switching to Norway.)
2013
2nd Time trial, Latvian National Road Championships
2014
2nd Time trial, Latvian National Road Championships
6th Overall Tour de Bretagne Féminin
2016
Norwegian National Road Championships

1st Road race
1st Time trial

1st Overall NEA

1st Stage 1a (ITT) & 2

KZN Summer Series

1st Races 1 & 2

4th Chrono des Nations
7th Ljubljana–Domžale–Ljubljana TT
8th 94.7 Cycle Challenge
2017
Norwegian National Road Championships

1st Road race
1st Time trial

1st Mountains classification, Belgium Tour
2nd 94.7 Cycle Challenge
9th Grand Prix de Plumelec-Morbihan Dames
2018
Norwegian National Road Championships

1st Road race
3rd Time trial

6th Overall Women's Tour of Thailand
6th Chrono Champenois
2019
1st Time trial, Norwegian National Road Championships
1st Overall Tour de Feminin – O cenu Českého Švýcarska

1st Stage 3a (ITT)

1st Chrono Champenois
1st Stage 3 Thüringen Rundfahrt der Frauen
2nd Overall Tour of Uppsala

1st Stage 3

2nd Chrono des Nations
4th Time trial, UEC European Road Championships
2020
2nd Time trial, Norwegian National Road Championships
2021
Norwegian National Road Championships

1st Road race
2nd Time trial

9th Overall Tour de Feminin – O cenu Českého Švýcarska
