= Ragnvald Martinsen =

Norwegian cyclist

Personal information
- Born: 15 August 1906 Oslo, Norway
- Died: 15 December 1987 (aged 81) Oslo, Norway

Cycling career
- Sport: Cycling

Ragnvald Martinsen (15 August 1906 – 15 December 1987) was a Norwegian cyclist. He competed in the individual road race at the 1928 Summer Olympics.
