= Thea Thorsen =

Norwegian cyclist

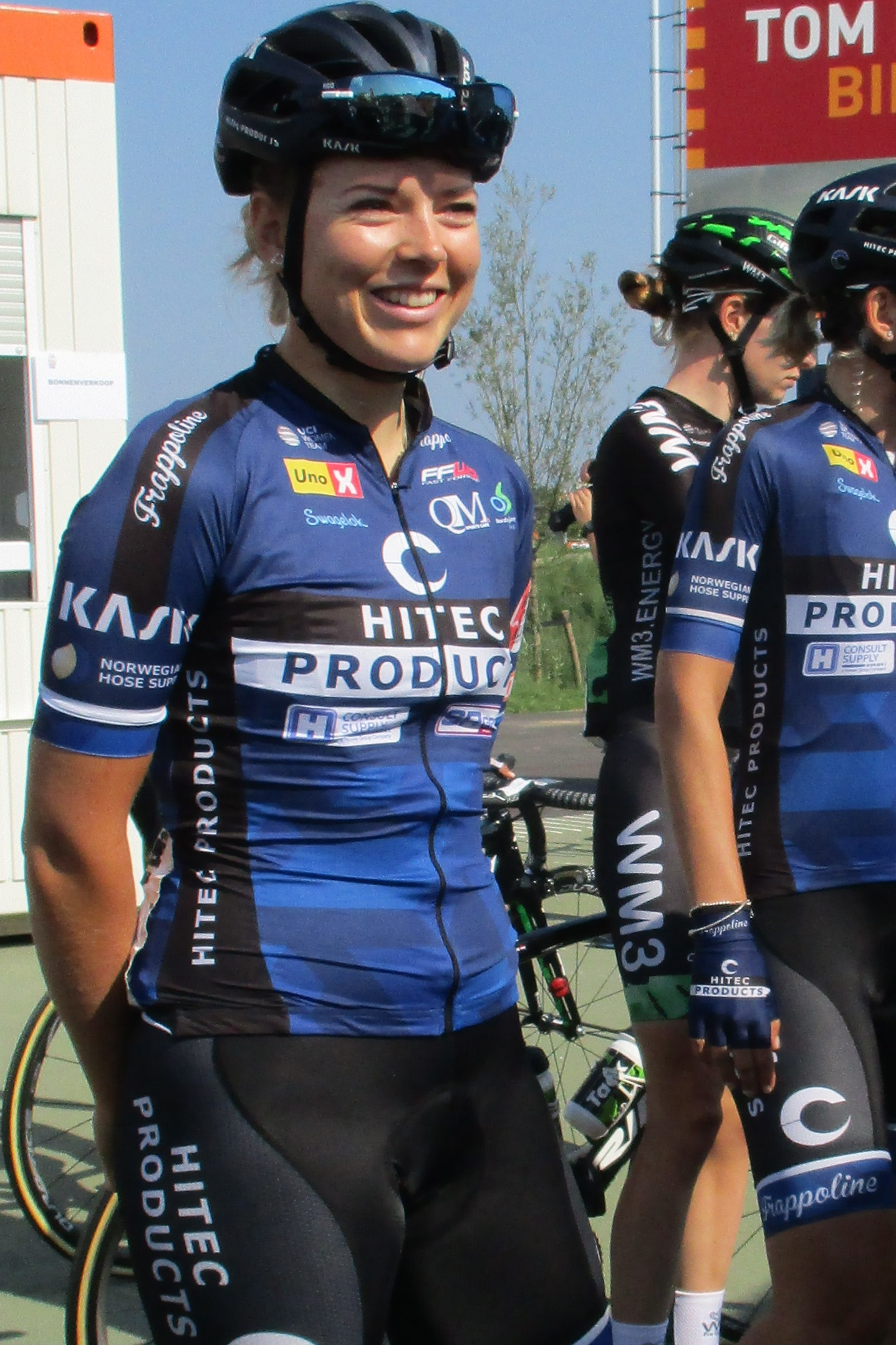
- Thorsen at the 2017 Holland Ladies Tour

Personal information
- Full name: Thea Thorsen
- Born: 15 March 1992 (age 34)

Cycling career
- Sport: Cycling
- Current team: Retired
- Discipline: Road
- Role: Rider

Professional team
- 2012–2018: Hitec Products–Mistral Home

Thea Thorsen (born 15 March 1992) is a Norwegian former racing cyclist, who competed professionally for UCI Women's Team Hitec Products–Birk Sport between 2012 and 2018. She competed in the 2013 UCI women's time trial in Florence.
