= Lise Nøstvold =

Norwegian cyclist

Lise Nostvold
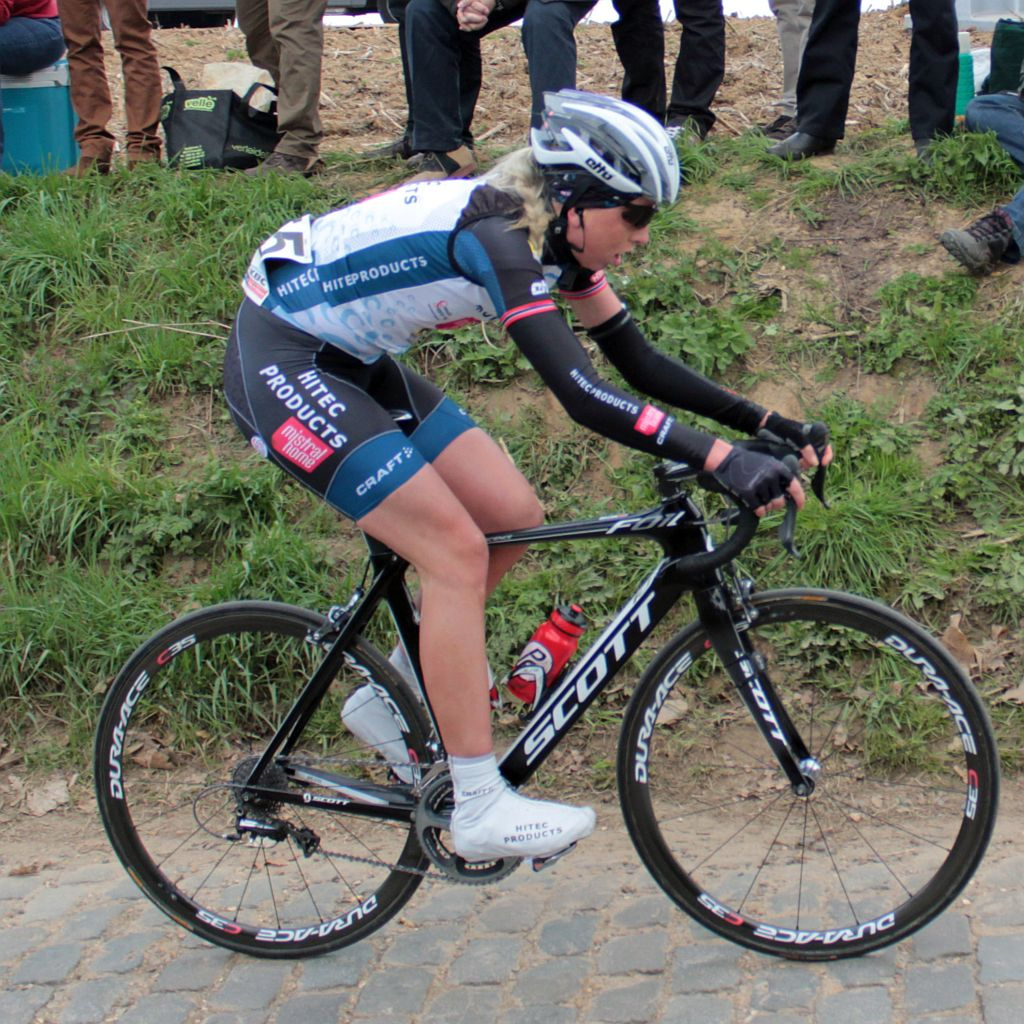

Personal information
- Born: 14 February 1987 (age 39) Norway

Cycling career
- Sport: Cycling
- Discipline: Road cycling

Lise Nostvold (born 14 February 1987) is a road cyclist from Norway. She won the Norwegian National Road Race Championship in 2010. She participated at the 2012 UCI Road World Championships.
