= Cecilie Gotaas Johnsen =

Norwegian cyclist (born 1976

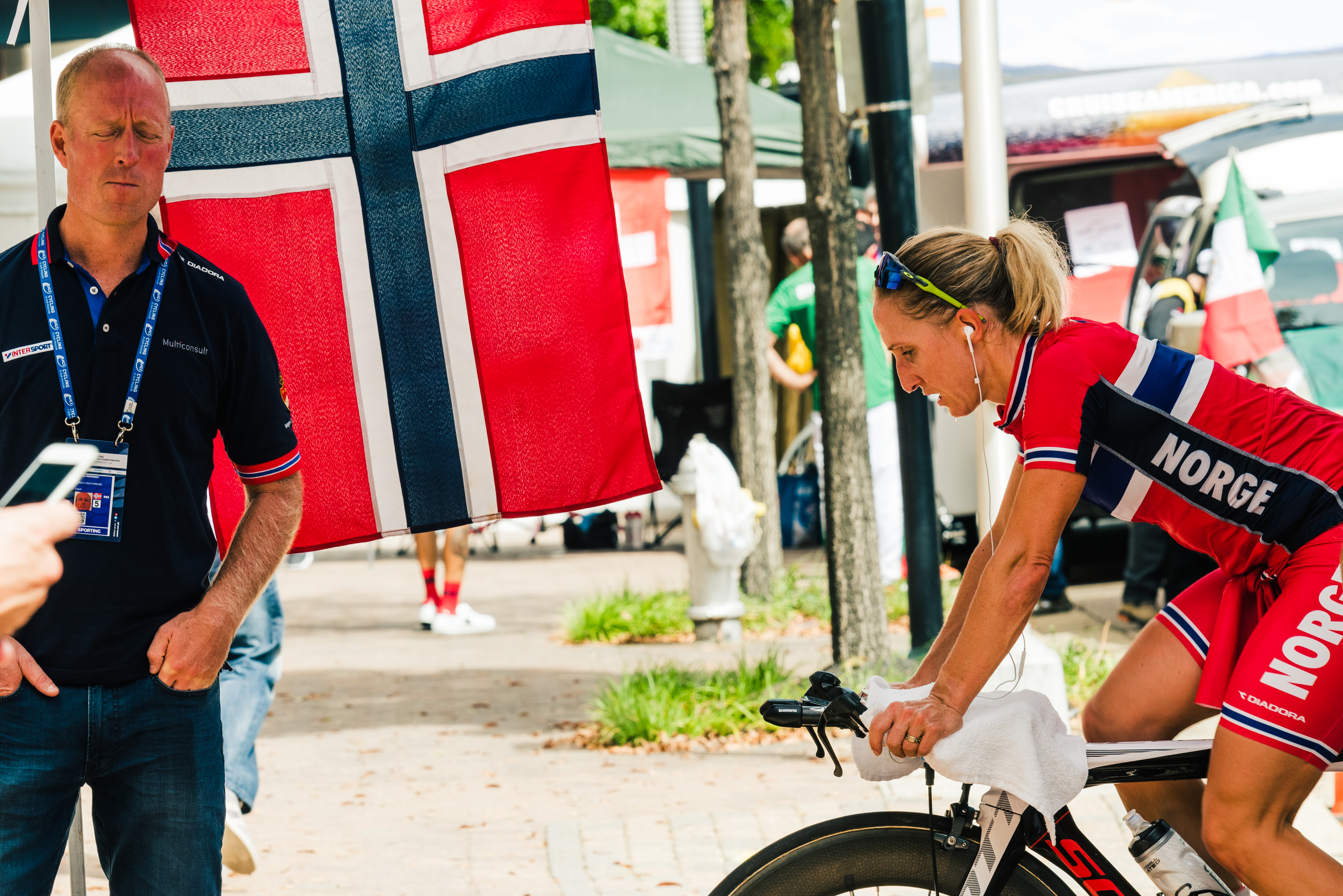
- Johnsen at the 2015 UCI Road World Championships

Personal information
- Full name: Cecilie Gotaas Johnsen
- Born: 20 April 1976 (age 50) Trondheim, Norway

Cycling career
- Sport: Cycling
- Current team: Retired
- Discipline: Road
- Role: Rider

Professional team
- 2013–2017: Team Hitec Products

Cecilie Gotaas Johnsen (born 20 April 1976) is a Norwegian former professional road cyclist and footballer. She competed in the 2013 UCI women's road race in Florence. She won the Norwegian National Road Race Championships in 2013.

In 2022, Gotaas Johnsen was appointed the chairwoman at Norwegian professional football club Rosenborg BK. She had previously played 17 Toppserien games for Sportsklubben Trondheims-Ørn in the 1990s, prior to their merger with Rosenborg BK to form Rosenborg BK Kvinner.

== Major results ==
2012
Tour Cycliste Féminin International de l'Ardèche

1st Prologue & Stage 1

National Road Championships

2nd Time trial
8th Road race

6th Chrono des Nations
8th Team time trial, UCI Road World Championships
2013
National Road Championships

1st Road race
2nd Time trial

3rd Overall Tour of Zhoushan Island

1st Points classification
1st Mountains classification
1st Stages 2 & 3

9th Open de Suède Vårgårda TTT
2014
National Road Championships

2nd Road race
3rd Time trial

6th Chrono des Nations
9th Chrono Champenois-Trophée Européen
10th Tour of Chongming Island World Cup
2015
National Road Championships

1st Time trial
2nd Road race

9th Chrono des Nations
10th Overall The Princess Maha Chackri Sirindhon's Cup
2016
2nd Time trial, National Road Championships
4th Ljubljana–Domžale–Ljubljana TT
5th Chrono des Nations
10th Chrono Champenois
2017
9th Overall Tour of Thailand
