= SK Rye =

Norwegian sports club

Logo.

Sportsklubben Rye is a sports club based in Oslo, Norway. It has sections for cycling, triathlon, swimming, and athletics.

SK Rye is responsible for arranging Nordmarka Rundt, Øyeren Rundt, Oslo Triathon, Ryeløpet and one stage of the Scott Cup every season.

Riders from SK Rye have dominated the 540 km Styrkeprøven race in recent years, and also hold the record for the fastest time.
