= Team Coop–Repsol (women's team) =

Norwegian cycling team

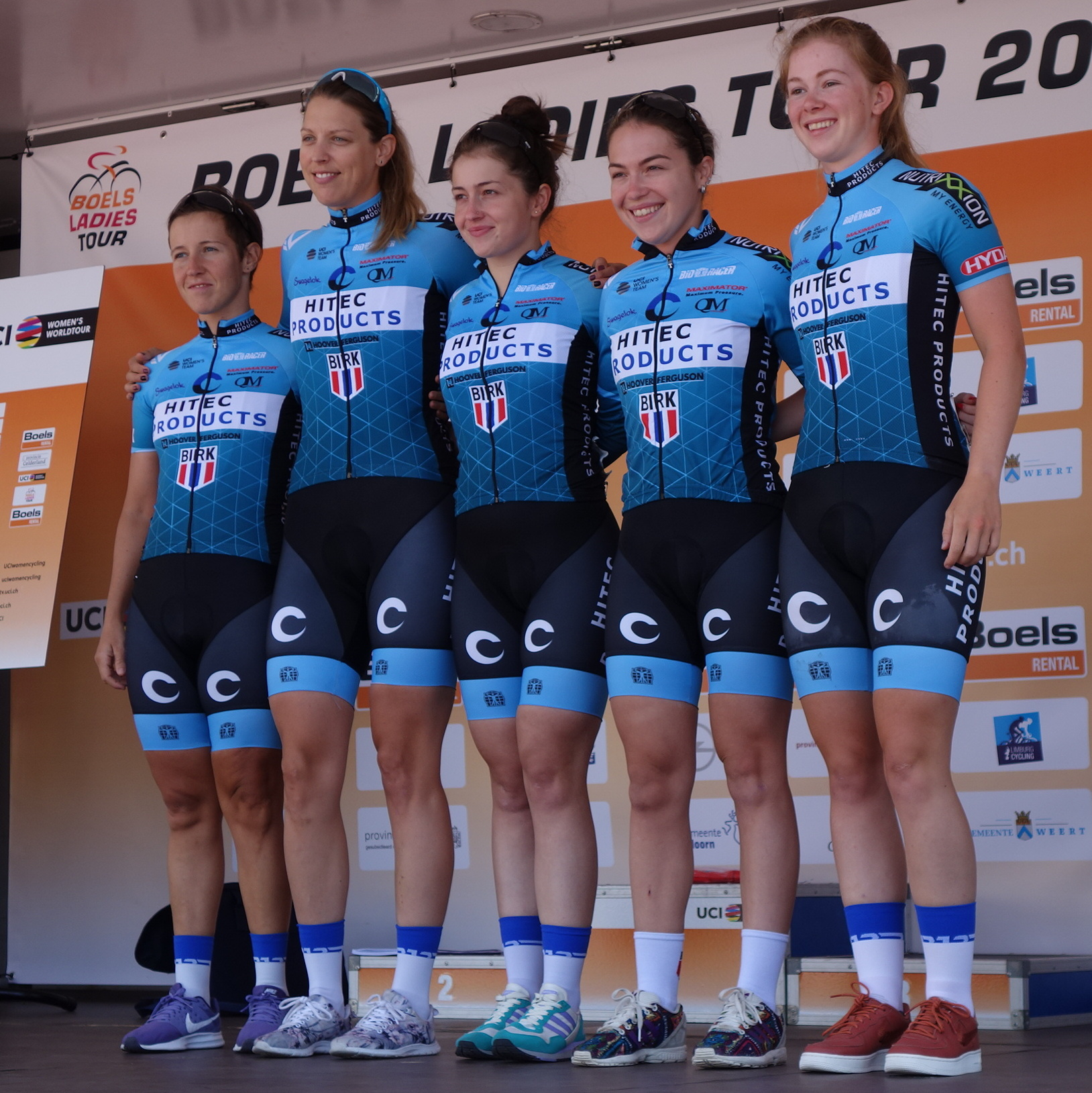

Team information
- UCI code: HPU
- Registered: Norway
- Founded: 2009
- Disbanded: 2026
- Discipline: Road
- Status: UCI Women's Team (2009–2019); UCI Women's Continental Team (2020–2026)
- Bicycles: Factor

Key personnel
- Team manager: Karl Lima

Team name history
- 2009–2011 2012 2013–2017 2018–2020 2021 2021–2023 2024–2025 2026: Hitec Products UCK; Hitec Products–Mistral Home; Hitec Products; Hitec Products–Birk Sport; Team Hitec Products; Team Coop–Hitec Products; Team Coop–Repsol; Hitec Products-Fluid Control
Team Coop–Repsol jersey
Jersey

Team Coop–Repsol (UCI Code: HPU) was a professional women's cycling team based in Norway that competes in elite road bicycle racing events.

It was sponsored by Coop Norge, a Norwegian cooperative with head office in Oslo, and Repsol, a Spanish multinational energy and petrochemical company based in Madrid.

== Team history ==
=== 2013 ===
==== Riders in ====
On 14 August 2013 it was announced that South African National time trial and road race champion Ashleigh Moolman would be joining the team from Lotto–Belisol Ladies.

=== 2014 ===
==== Riders in ====
On September 1 Cyclingnews.com reported that Kirsten Wild would leave Giant–Shimano and join the team for the 2015 season on a 2-year contract and later in the same month Vita Heine Petersone joined the team for the following season. On 27 October the team signed Tatiana Guderzo, with Thea Thorsen and Cecile Gotaas Johnsen signing contract extensions.

=== 2021 ===
In March 2021, the women's Team Hitec Products merged with the men's Team Coop for form the current team.

=== 2026 ===
The team were renamed as Hitec Products-Fluid Control for the 2026 season.

On November 2026, the team announced its closure after 18 seasons, with lack of funding cited as the main reason.

== Team roster ==
As of 14 May 2025.

Rider	Date of birth
Camilla Rånes Bye (NOR)	17 November 2004 (age 22)
Stine Dale (NOR)	11 November 1998 (age 28)
India Grangier (FRA)	5 January 2000 (age 26)
Monica Greenwood (GBR)	24 February 1989 (age 37)
Sigrid Ytterhus Haugset (NOR)	1 March 1999 (age 27)
Tiril Jørgensen (NOR)	29 October 2000 (age 26)
Stina Kagevi (SWE)	28 August 2005 (age 21)

Rider	Date of birth
Magdalene Lind (NOR)	16 May 2002 (age 24)
Mari Hole Mohr (NOR)	1 March 2001 (age 25)
Laura Lizette Sander (EST)	15 May 2004 (age 22)
April Tacey (GBR)	12 October 2000 (age 26)
Aidi Gerde Tuisk (EST)	1 March 2002 (age 24)
Eline Van Rooijen (NED)	29 August 2001 (age 25)

== Major wins ==
2011
Omloop Het Nieuwsblad, Emma Johansson
Omloop van het Hageland, Emma Johansson
Cholet Pays de Loire Dames, Emma Johansson
Grand Prix de Dottignies, Emma Johansson
Stage 3b Iurreta-Emakumeen Bira, Emma Johansson
Giro del Trentino Alto Adige-Südtirol, Emma Johansson
Overall Thüringen Rundfahrt der Frauen, Emma Johansson

Stage 2, Emma Johansson

Stage 5 Trophée d'Or Féminin, Emilie Moberg
Stage 6 Trophée d'Or Féminin, Emma Johansson
Stage 2 Tour Cycliste Féminin International de l'Ardèche, Emilie Moberg
2012
Overall Tour of Zhoushan Island, Emilie Moberg

Stage 1, Emilie Moberg

Overall Tour de Free State, Emma Johansson

Stage 3, Emma Johansson

Youth classification Giro d'Italia Femminile, Elisa Longo Borghini

Stage 9, Emma Johansson

Mountains classification Thüringen Rundfahrt der Frauen, Elisa Longo Borghini

Youth classification, Elisa Longo Borghini

Prologue & Stage 1 Tour Cycliste Féminin International de l'Ardèche, Cecilie Gotaas Johnsen
2013
Stage 1 Ladies Tour of Qatar, Chloe Hosking
Trofeo Alfredo Binda-Comune di Cittiglio, Elisa Longo Borghini
Points classification, Tour of Chongming Island, Chloe Hosking
Points classification Tour of Zhoushan Island, Cecilie Gotaas Johnsen

Mountains classification, Cecilie Gotaas Johnsen
Stages 2 & 3, Cecilie Gotaas Johnsen

Mountains classification Emakumeen Euskal Bira, Elisa Longo Borghini

Stage 4, Elisa Longo Borghini

2014
EPZ Omloop van Borsele (Road Race), Chloe Hosking
Grand Prix de Plumelec-Morbihan Dames, Audrey Cordon
Italian rider classification Giro d'Italia Femminile, Elisa Longo Borghini
Overall Tour de Bretagne Féminin, Elisa Longo Borghini

Points classification, Audrey Cordon
Mountains classification, Elisa Longo Borghini
Teams classification
Prologue & Stage 3, Elisa Longo Borghini
Stage 4, Audrey Cordon

Overall Trophée d'Or Féminin, Elisa Longo Borghini

Mountains classification, Elisa Longo Borghini
Stage 4, Elisa Longo Borghini

Young riders classification Holland Ladies Tour, Elisa Longo Borghini
Stage 3 Belgium Tour, Chloe Hosking
2015
Novilon Eurocup, Kirsten Wild
Stage 2 The Princess Maha Chackri Sirindhon's Cup, Lauren Kitchen
Stage 3 Energiewacht Tour, Kirsten Wild
Ronde van Gelderland, Kirsten Wild
EPZ Omloop van Borsele, Kirsten Wild
Ronde van Overijssel Women, Lauren Kitchen
Tour of Chongming Island, Kirsten Wild

Stages 1 & 2, Kirsten Wild

Overall Tour of Zhoushan Island, Lauren Kitchen

Stage 1, Tatiana Guderzo
Stage 2, Lauren Kitchen

Grand Prix Cycliste de Gatineau, Kirsten Wild
Omloop van de IJsseldelta, Kirsten Wild
Stages 2 & 4 Tour de Feminin-O cenu Českého Švýcarska, Emilie Moberg
Stage 4 Tour de Bretagne Féminin, Kirsten Wild
2016
Points classification Ladies Tour of Qatar, Kirsten Wild

Stage 1, Kirsten Wild

Stages 4a & 5 Energiewacht Tour, Kirsten Wild
Women's Tour de Yorkshire, Kirsten Wild
Overall NEA, Vita Heine

Stages 1 (ITT) & 2, Vita Heine

Stage 4 Tour of California, Kirsten Wild
Prudential RideLondon Grand Prix, Kirsten Wild
KZN Summer Series Race 1, Vita Heine
KZN Summer Series Race 2, Vita Heine
2017
Youth classification Tour of Thailand, Miriam Bjørnsrud
Stage 5 Healthy Ageing Tour, Emilie Moberg
Overall Tour of Zhoushan Island, Charlotte Becker

Points classification, Emilie Moberg
Teams classification
Stages 1 & 3, Emilie Moberg
Stage 2, Charlotte Becker

Diamond Tour, Nina Kessler
Norwegian rider classification Ladies Tour of Norway, Susanne Andersen
2018
Overall Tour of Chongming Island, Charlotte Becker

Stage 2, Charlotte Becker

Team classification Tour of Zhoushan Island

Stage 2, Charlotte Becker

Jaeren Sykkelfestival – Sandnes, Line Marie Gulliksen
Sandnes, Ingrid Moe
Erondegemse Pijl, Nina Kessler
2019
Stage 3 Tour of Uppsala, Vita Heine
Stage 3 Thüringen Rundfahrt der Frauen, Vita Heine
Omloop van de IJsseldelta, Marta Tagliaferro
Overall Tour de Feminin-O cenu Českého Švýcarska, Vita Heine

Stage 1, Marta Tagliaferro
Stage 3a, Vita Heine

Chrono Champenois, Vita Heine
2020
Stage 1 Dubai Women's Tour, Lucy van der Haar
2022
Frisian rider classification Bloeizone Fryslân Tour, Nicole Steigenga

== National and continental champions ==
2010
Norway Road Race, Lise Hafsø Nøstvold
2011
Sweden Road Race, Emma Johansson
Norway Road Race, Frøydis Wærsted
2012
Sweden Time Trial, Emma Johansson
Sweden Road Race, Emma Johansson
Norway Time Trial, Lise Nøstvold
Norway Criterium, Emilie Møberg
2013
Sweden Road Race, Emilia Fahlin
Norway Road Race, Cecilie Gotaas Johnsen
2014
South Africa Time Trial, Ashleigh Moolman
South Africa Road Race, Ashleigh Moolman
Italy Time Trial, Elisa Longo Borghini
Denmark Time Trial, Julie Leth
Sweden Criterium, Sara Olsson
2015
Oceania Road Race, Lauren Kitchen
Norway Time Trial, Cecilie Gotaas Johnsen
Norway Road Race, Miriam Bjørnsrud
Netherlands Track (Madison), Kirsten Wild
Netherlands Track (Individual pursuit), Kirsten Wild
2016
Italy Track (Scratch race), Simona Frapporti
Norway Junior Road Race, Susanne Andersen
Norway Time Trial, Vita Heine
Norway Junior Time Trial, Susanne Andersen
German Track (Points race), Charlotte Becker
European Track (Elimination race), Kirsten Wild
European Track (Team pursuit), Tatiana Guderzo
European Track (Team pursuit), Simona Frapporti
European Track (Points race), Kirsten Wild
Netherlands Track (Madison), Kirsten Wild
Netherlands Track (Individual pursuit), Kirsten Wild
Netherlands Track (Scratch race), Kirsten Wild
Netherlands Track (Points race), Kirsten Wild
Italy Track (Individual pursuit), Simona Frapporti
2017
Norway Time Trial, Vita Heine
Norway Road Race, Vita Heine
German Track (Omnium), Charlotte Becker
Netherlands Track (Madison), Nina Kessler
2018
Norway Time Trial, Line Marie Gulliksen
Norway Criterium, Susanne Andersen
Norway Road Race, Vita Heine
German Track (Scratch race), Charlotte Becker
German Track (Points race), Charlotte Becker
German Track (Team pursuit), Charlotte Becker
Norway Cyclo-cross, Ingrid Moe
2019
Norway Criterium, Ingvild Gaaskjenn
Norway Time Trial, Vita Heine
Norway Road Race, Ingrid Lorvik
2020
European Team Time Trial, Mieke Kröger
2021
Olympic Games Track (Team pursuit), Mieke Kröger
World Mixed team relay, Mieke Kröger
UEC European Track (Team pursuit), Mieke Kröger
World Track (Team pursuit), Mieke Kröger
Norway Track (Individual pursuit), Nora Tveit
Norway Track (500m time trial), Nora Tveit
2022
Norway Time Trial, Ane Iversen
