= 2021 European Road Championships – Men's elite road race =

Men's elite road race
2021 European Road Championships

Race details
- Dates: 12 September 2021
- Stages: 1
- Distance: 179.2 km (111.3 mi)
- Winning time: 4h 19' 45"

Medalists
	Gold	Sonny Colbrelli (ITA)
	Silver	Remco Evenepoel (BEL)
	Bronze	Benoît Cosnefroy (FRA)

The men's elite road race at the 2021 European Road Championships took place on 12 September 2021, in Trentino, Italy. Nations were allowed to enter between 1 and 8 riders into the event, dependent on UCI rankings.

== Results ==
Rank	#	Cyclist	Nation	Time	Diff.
1st place, gold medalist(s)	33	Sonny Colbrelli	Italy	4:19:45	
2nd place, silver medalist(s)	3	Remco Evenepoel	Belgium	s.t.	
3rd place, bronze medalist(s)	12	Benoît Cosnefroy	France	4:21:15	01:30
4	36	Matteo Trentin	Italy	4:21:29	01:44
5	21	Tadej Pogačar	Slovenia	s.t.	
6	55	Marc Hirschi	Switzerland	s.t.	
7	78	Markus Hoelgaard	Norway	s.t.	
8	5	Ben Hermans	Belgium	4:21:31	01:46
9	73	Pavel Sivakov	Russia	4:21:34	01:49
10	1	Victor Campenaerts	Belgium	4:25:26	05:41
11	2	Stan Dewulf	Belgium	4:25:34	05:49
12	9	Romain Bardet	France	s.t.	
13	18	Matej Mohorič	Slovenia	4:25:35	05:50
14	62	João Almeida	Portugal	4:25:45	06:00
15	37	Diego Ulissi	Italy	s.t.	
16	46	Simon Geschke	Germany	s.t.	
17	25	Bauke Mollema	Netherlands	4:26:00	06:15
18	63	Rui Costa	Portugal	4:28:58	09:13
19	22	Koen Bouwman	Netherlands	s.t.	
20	97	Michael Kukrle	Czech Republic	s.t.	
21	74	Dmitry Strakhov	Russia	s.t.	
22	92	Felix Großschartner	Austria	s.t.	
23	77	Odd Christian Eiking	Norway	s.t.	
24	54	Matteo Badilatti	Switzerland	s.t.	
25	10	Warren Barguil	France	s.t.	
26	68	Sergey Chernetskiy	Russia	s.t.	
27	59	Sébastien Reichenbach	Switzerland	s.t.	
28	65	Nelson Oliveira	Portugal	s.t.	
29	38	Roger Adrià	Spain	4:29:01	09:16
30	35	Gianni Moscon	Italy	4:29:06	09:21
31	7	Harm Vanhoucke	Belgium	s.t.	
DNF	4	Philippe Gilbert	Belgium		
DNF	6	Dylan Teuns	Belgium		
DNF	8	Gianni Vermeersch	Belgium		
DNF	11	Franck Bonnamour	France		
DNF	13	Valentin Madouas	France		
DNF	14	Aurélien Paret-Peintre	France		
DNF	15	Pierre-Luc Périchon	France		
DNF	16	Thibaut Pinot	France		
DNF	17	Žiga Jerman	Slovenia		
DNF	19	Domen Novak	Slovenia		
DNF	20	David Per	Slovenia		
DNF	23	Sebastian Langeveld	Netherlands		
DNF	24	Jan Maas	Netherlands		
DNF	26	Timo Roosen	Netherlands		
DNF	27	Ide Schelling	Netherlands		
DNF	28	Julius van den Berg	Netherlands		
DNF	29	Nick van der Lijke	Netherlands		
DNF	30	Giovanni Aleotti	Italy		
DNF	31	Andrea Bagioli	Italy		
DNF	32	Mattia Cattaneo	Italy		
DNF	34	Filippo Ganna	Italy		
DNF	39	David de la Cruz	Spain		
DNF	40	Imanol Erviti	Spain		
DNF	41	Iván García Cortina	Spain		
DNF	42	Gorka Izagirre	Spain		
DNF	43	Ion Izagirre	Spain		
DNF	44	Mikel Landa	Spain		
DNF	45	Antonio Jesús Soto	Spain		
DNF	47	Miguel Heidemann	Germany		
DNF	48	Florian Lipowitz	Germany		
DNF	49	Jonas Rapp	Germany		
DNF	50	Jonas Rutsch	Germany		
DNF	51	Immanuel Stark	Germany		
DNF	52	Jannik Steimle	Germany		
DNF	53	Georg Steinhauser	Germany		
DNF	56	Fabian Lienhard	Switzerland		
DNF	57	Gino Mäder	Switzerland		
DNF	58	Simon Pellaud	Switzerland		
DNF	60	Roland Thalmann	Switzerland		
DNF	61	Yannis Voisard	Switzerland		
DNF	64	Ruben Guerreiro	Portugal		
DNF	66	Rui Oliveira	Portugal		
DNF	67	Rafael Reis	Portugal		
DNF	69	Pavel Kochetkov	Russia		
DNF	70	Roman Maikin	Russia		
DNF	71	Denis Nekrasov	Russia		
DNF	72	Artem Nych	Russia		
DNF	75	Kristian Aasvold	Norway		
DNF	76	Sven Erik Bystrøm	Norway		
DNF	79	Alexander Kristoff	Norway		
DNF	80	Andreas Leknessund	Norway		
DNF	81	Sam Bennett	Ireland		
DNF	82	Conn McDunphy	Ireland		
DNF	83	Ryan Mullen	Ireland		
DNF	84	Matthew Teggart	Ireland		
DNF	85	Marcin Budziński	Poland		
DNF	86	Michał Gołaś	Poland		
DNF	87	Jakub Kaczmarek	Poland		
DNF	88	Przemysław Kasperkiewicz	Poland		
DNF	89	Maciej Paterski	Poland		
DNF	90	Szymon Tracz	Poland		
DNF	91	Felix Gall	Austria		
DNF	93	Marco Haller	Austria		
DNF	94	Hermann Pernsteiner	Austria		
DNF	95	Sebastian Schönberger	Austria		
DNF	96	Jan Bárta	Czech Republic		
DNF	98	Zdeněk Štybar	Czech Republic		
DNF	99	Adam Ťoupalík	Czech Republic		
DNF	100	Daniel Turek	Czech Republic		
DNF	101	Juraj Bellan	Slovakia		
DNF	102	Marek Čanecký	Slovakia		
DNF	103	Martin Haring	Slovakia		
DNF	104	Juraj Sagan	Slovakia		
DNF	105	Peter Sagan	Slovakia		
DNF	106	Patrik Tybor	Slovakia		
DNF	107	Gert Kivistik	Estonia		
DNF	108	Karl Patrick Lauk	Estonia		
DNF	109	Mihkel Räim	Estonia		
DNF	110	Rein Taaramäe	Estonia		
DNF	111	Norman Vahtra	Estonia		
DNF	112	Anatoliy Budyak	Ukraine		
DNF	113	Vitaliy Buts	Ukraine		
DNF	114	Oleksandr Golovash	Ukraine		
DNF	115	Mykhaylo Kononenko	Ukraine		
DNF	116	Andriy Kulyk	Ukraine		
DNF	117	Mark Padun	Ukraine		
DNF	118	Kevin Geniets	Luxembourg		
DNF	119	Michel Ries	Luxembourg		
DNF	120	Luc Wirtgen	Luxembourg		
DNF	121	Jan Petelin	Luxembourg		
DNF	122	Aleksandr Riabushenko	Belarus		
DNF	123	Emil Dima	Romania		
DNF	124	Edgaras Kovaliovas	Lithuania		
DNF	125	Venantas Lašinis	Lithuania		
DNF	126	Evaldas Šiškevičius	Lithuania		
DNF	127	Viktor Filutás	Hungary		
DNF	128	Barnabás Peák	Hungary		
DNF	129	János Pelikán	Hungary		
DNF	130	Attila Valter	Hungary		
DNF	131	Lucas Eriksson	Sweden		
DNF	132	Kim Magnusson	Sweden		
DNF	133	Georgios Boutopoulos	Greece		
DNF	134	Marolino Hoxha	Albania		
DNF	135	Mejdin Malhani	Albania		
DNF	136	Ylber Sefa	Albania		
DNF	137	Olsian Velia	Albania		
DNF	138	Ukko Peltonen	Finland		
DNF	139	Omer Goldstein	Israel		
DNF	140	Guy Sagiv	Israel		
DNF	141	Josip Rumac	Croatia		
DNF	142	Spas Gyurov	Bulgaria		
DNF	143	Hafsteinn Geirsson	Iceland		
DNF	144	Ingvar Ómarsson	Iceland		
DNF	145	Cristian Raileanu	Moldova		
DNF	146	Andrej Petrovski	North Macedonia		
DNF	147	Andreas Miltiadis	Cyprus		
DNF	148	Antoine Berlin	Monaco		
DNF	149	Victor Langellotti	Monaco		
DNF	150	Musa Mikayilzade	Azerbaijan		
