= 2022 Arctic Race of Norway =

2022 UCI Europe Tour 2022 UCI ProSeries

Race details
- Dates: 11 – 14 August 2022
- Stages: 4
- Distance: 677.9 km (421.2 mi)
- Winning time: 16h 11' 32"

Results
Jersey awarded to the overall winner	Winner	Andreas Leknessund (NOR)	(Team DSM)
	Second	Hugo Houle (CAN)	(Israel–Premier Tech)
	Third	Nicola Conci (ITA)	(Alpecin–Deceuninck)
Jersey awarded to the points classification winner	Points	Axel Zingle (FRA)	(Cofidis)
Jersey awarded to the mountains classification winner	Mountains	Stephen Bassett (USA)	(Human Powered Health)
Jersey awarded to the youth classification winner	Youth	Andreas Leknessund (NOR)	(Team DSM)
	Team	Alpecin–Deceuninck	

The 2022 Arctic Race of Norway was a road cycling stage race that took place between 11 and 14 August 2022. It was the ninth edition of the Arctic Race of Norway, which is rated as a 2.Pro event on the 2022 UCI Europe Tour and the 2022 UCI ProSeries calendars.

== Teams ==
Six UCI WorldTeams, ten UCI ProTeams, and three UCI Continental teams made up the nineteen teams that participated in the race.

UCI WorldTeams

- Astana Qazaqstan Team
- Cofidis
- Intermarché–Wanty–Gobert Matériaux
- Israel–Premier Tech
- Team BikeExchange–Jayco
- Team DSM

UCI ProTeams

- Alpecin–Deceuninck
- Arkéa–Samsic
- B&B Hotels–KTM
- Burgos BH
- Bingoal Pauwels Sauces WB
- Euskaltel–Euskadi
- Human Powered Health
- Sport Vlaanderen–Baloise
- Team TotalEnergies
- Uno-X Pro Cycling Team

UCI Continental Teams

- China Glory Continental Cycling Team
- Team Coop
- Trinity Racing

== Route ==
Stage characteristics and winners
Stage	Date	Course	Distance	Type	Stage winner
1	11 August	Mo i Rana to Mo i Rana	186.8 km (116.1 mi)	Hilly stage	Axel Zingle (FRA)
2	12 August	Mosjøen to Brønnøysund	154.3 km (95.9 mi)	Hilly stage	Dylan Groenewegen (NED)
3	13 August	Namsos to Skallstuggu summit (Levanger Municipality)	177.7 km (110.4 mi)	Mountain stage	Victor Lafay (FRA)
4	14 August	Trondheim to Trondheim	159.1 km (98.9 mi)	Hilly stage	Andreas Leknessund (NOR)
Total			677.9 km (421.2 mi)		

== Stages ==
=== Stage 1 ===
11 August 2022 – Mo i Rana to Mo i Rana, 186.8 km (116.1 mi)

Stage 1 Result
Rank	Rider	Team	Time
1	Axel Zingle (FRA)	Cofidis	4h 50' 09"
2	Gleb Syritsa	Astana Qazaqstan Team	+ 1"
3	Mathieu Burgaudeau (FRA)	Team TotalEnergies	+ 1"
4	Amaury Capiot (BEL)	Arkéa–Samsic	+ 1"
5	Nick Schultz (AUS)	Team BikeExchange–Jayco	+ 1"
6	Maurice Ballerstedt (GER)	Alpecin–Deceuninck	+ 1"
7	Håkon Aalrust (NOR)	Team Coop	+ 1"
8	Andreas Stokbro (DEN)	Team Coop	+ 1"
9	Antonio Angulo (ESP)	Euskaltel–Euskadi	+ 1"
10	Quinten Hermans (BEL)	Intermarché–Wanty–Gobert Matériaux	+ 1"

General classification after Stage 1
Rank	Rider	Team	Time
1	Axel Zingle (FRA)	Cofidis	4h 49' 49"
2	Mathieu Burgaudeau (FRA)	Team TotalEnergies	+ 4"
3	Gleb Syritsa	Astana Qazaqstan Team	+ 5"
4	Kristian Aasvold (NOR)	Human Powered Health	+ 8"
5	Kenneth Van Rooy (BEL)	Sport Vlaanderen–Baloise	+ 8"
6	Sjoerd Bax (NED)	Alpecin–Deceuninck	+ 9"
7	Amaury Capiot (BEL)	Arkéa–Samsic	+ 11"
8	Nick Schultz (AUS)	Team BikeExchange–Jayco	+ 11"
9	Maurice Ballerstedt (GER)	Alpecin–Deceuninck	+ 11"
10	Håkon Aalrust (NOR)	Team Coop	+ 11"

=== Stage 2 ===
12 August 2022 – Mosjøen to Brønnøysund, 154.3 km (95.9 mi)

Stage 2 Result
Rank	Rider	Team	Time
1	Dylan Groenewegen (NED)	Team BikeExchange–Jayco	3h 41' 17"
2	Amaury Capiot (BEL)	Arkéa–Samsic	+ 0"
3	Edvald Boasson Hagen (NOR)	Team TotalEnergies	+ 0"
4	Blake Quick (AUS)	Trinity Racing	+ 0"
5	Matteo Malucelli (ITA)	China Glory Continental Cycling Team	+ 0"
6	Florian Dauphin (FRA)	B&B Hotels–KTM	+ 0"
7	Krists Neilands (LVA)	Israel–Premier Tech	+ 0"
8	Matthew Gibson (GBR)	Human Powered Health	+ 0"
9	Martin Bugge Urianstad (NOR)	Uno-X Pro Cycling Team	+ 0"
10	Gleb Syritsa	Astana Qazaqstan Team	+ 0"

General classification after Stage 2
Rank	Rider	Team	Time
1	Axel Zingle (FRA)	Cofidis	8h 31' 14"
2	Mathieu Burgaudeau (FRA)	Team TotalEnergies	+ 5"
3	Amaury Capiot (BEL)	Arkéa–Samsic	+ 7"
4	Gleb Syritsa	Astana Qazaqstan Team	+ 7"
5	Edvald Boasson Hagen (NOR)	Team TotalEnergies	+ 9"
6	Kenneth Van Rooy (BEL)	Sport Vlaanderen–Baloise	+ 10"
7	Kristian Aasvold (NOR)	Human Powered Health	+ 10"
8	Sven Erik Bystrøm (NOR)	Intermarché–Wanty–Gobert Matériaux	+ 10"
9	Liam Johnston (AUS)	Trinity Racing	+ 10"
10	Sjoerd Bax (NED)	Alpecin–Deceuninck	+ 11"

=== Stage 3 ===
13 August 2022 – Namsos to Skallstuggu summit (Levanger Municipality), 177.7 km (110.4 mi)

Stage 3 Result
Rank	Rider	Team	Time
1	Victor Lafay (FRA)	Cofidis	4h 09' 29"
2	Kévin Vauquelin (FRA)	Arkéa–Samsic	+ 3"
3	Hugo Houle (CAN)	Israel–Premier Tech	+ 3"
4	Sven Erik Bystrøm (NOR)	Intermarché–Wanty–Gobert Matériaux	+ 3"
5	Carl Fredrik Hagen (NOR)	Israel–Premier Tech	+ 3"
6	Quinten Hermans (BEL)	Intermarché–Wanty–Gobert Matériaux	+ 3"
7	Jason Osborne (GER)	Alpecin–Deceuninck	+ 3"
8	Nick Schultz (AUS)	Team BikeExchange–Jayco	+ 3"
9	Igor Chzhan (KAZ)	Astana Qazaqstan Team	+ 3"
10	Nicola Conci (ITA)	Alpecin–Deceuninck	+ 9"

General classification after Stage 3
Rank	Rider	Team	Time
1	Victor Lafay (FRA)	Cofidis	12h 40' 46"
2	Kévin Vauquelin (FRA)	Arkéa–Samsic	+ 7"
3	Hugo Houle (CAN)	Israel–Premier Tech	+ 9"
4	Sven Erik Bystrøm (NOR)	Intermarché–Wanty–Gobert Matériaux	+ 10"
5	Nick Schultz (AUS)	Team BikeExchange–Jayco	+ 13"
6	Quinten Hermans (BEL)	Intermarché–Wanty–Gobert Matériaux	+ 13"
7	Carl Fredrik Hagen (NOR)	Israel–Premier Tech	+ 13"
8	Jason Osborne (GER)	Alpecin–Deceuninck	+ 13"
9	Nicola Conci (ITA)	Alpecin–Deceuninck	+ 19"
10	Sjoerd Bax (NED)	Alpecin–Deceuninck	+ 20"

=== Stage 4 ===
14 August 2022 – Trondheim to Trondheim, 159.1 km (98.9 mi)

Stage 4 Result
Rank	Rider	Team	Time
1	Andreas Leknessund (NOR)	Team DSM	3h 30' 26"
2	Nicola Conci (ITA)	Alpecin–Deceuninck	+ 16"
3	Axel Zingle (FRA)	Cofidis	+ 18"
4	Max Poole (GBR)	Team DSM	+ 20"
5	Hugo Houle (CAN)	Israel–Premier Tech	+ 35"
6	Quinten Hermans (BEL)	Intermarché–Wanty–Gobert Matériaux	+ 35"
7	Mathieu Burgaudeau (FRA)	Team TotalEnergies	+ 35"
8	Kristian Sbaragli (ITA)	Alpecin–Deceuninck	+ 35"
9	Sjoerd Bax (NED)	Alpecin–Deceuninck	+ 35"
10	Victor Koretzky (FRA)	B&B Hotels–KTM	+ 35"

Final general classification
Rank	Rider	Team	Time
1	Andreas Leknessund (NOR)	Team DSM	16h 11' 32"
2	Hugo Houle (CAN)	Israel–Premier Tech	+ 8"
3	Nicola Conci (ITA)	Alpecin–Deceuninck	+ 9"
4	Axel Zingle (FRA)	Cofidis	+ 14"
5	Victor Lafay (FRA)	Cofidis	+ 15"
6	Kévin Vauquelin (FRA)	Arkéa–Samsic	+ 22"
7	Max Poole (GBR)	Team DSM	+ 23"
8	Quinten Hermans (BEL)	Intermarché–Wanty–Gobert Matériaux	+ 26"
9	Carl Fredrik Hagen (NOR)	Israel–Premier Tech	+ 28"
10	Sjoerd Bax (NED)	Alpecin–Deceuninck	+ 35"

== Classification leadership table ==
Classification leadership by stage
Stage	Winner	General classification	Points classification	Mountains classification	Young rider classification	Team classification
1	Axel Zingle	Axel Zingle	Axel Zingle (Note: On stage 2, Mathieu Burgaudeau, who was second in the points classification, wore the green jersey, because first placed Axel Zingle wore the gold jersey as the leader of the general classification.)	Stephen Bassett	Axel Zingle (Note: On stage 2, Gleb Syritsa, who was third in the young rider classification, wore the white jersey, because first placed Axel Zingle wore the gold jersey as the leader of the general classification and second placed Mathieu Burgaudeau wore the green jersey. On stage 3, Mathieu Burgaudeau wore the white jersey.)	Cofidis
2	Dylan Groenewegen	Axel Zingle	Amaury Capiot	Stephen Bassett	Axel Zingle	Cofidis
3	Victor Lafay	Victor Lafay	Amaury Capiot	Stephen Bassett	Kévin Vauquelin	Israel–Premier Tech
4	Andreas Leknessund	Andreas Leknessund	Axel Zingle	Stephen Bassett	Andreas Leknessund	Alpecin–Deceuninck
Final		Andreas Leknessund	Axel Zingle	Stephen Bassett	Andreas Leknessund	Alpecin–Deceuninck

== Classification standings ==
Legend
Denotes the leader of the general classification	Denotes the leader of the young rider classification
Denotes the leader of the points classification	Denotes the leader of the mountains classification

=== General classification ===
Final general classification (1–10)
Rank	Rider	Team	Time
1	Andreas Leknessund (NOR)	Team DSM	16h 11' 32"
2	Hugo Houle (CAN)	Israel–Premier Tech	+ 8"
3	Nicola Conci (ITA)	Alpecin–Deceuninck	+ 9"
4	Axel Zingle (FRA)	Cofidis	+ 14"
5	Victor Lafay (FRA)	Cofidis	+ 15"
6	Kévin Vauquelin (FRA)	Arkéa–Samsic	+ 22"
7	Max Poole (GBR)	Team DSM	+ 23"
8	Quinten Hermans (BEL)	Intermarché–Wanty–Gobert Matériaux	+ 26"
9	Carl Fredrik Hagen (NOR)	Israel–Premier Tech	+ 28"
10	Sjoerd Bax (NED)	Alpecin–Deceuninck	+ 35"

=== Points classification ===
Final points classification (1–10)
Rank	Rider	Team	Points
1	Axel Zingle (FRA)	Cofidis	29
2	Andreas Leknessund (NOR)	Team DSM	21
3	Amaury Capiot (BEL)	Arkéa–Samsic	20
4	Mathieu Burgaudeau (FRA)	Team TotalEnergies	17
5	Hugo Houle (CAN)	Israel–Premier Tech	16
6	Victor Lafay (FRA)	Cofidis	15
7	Dylan Groenewegen (NED)	Team BikeExchange–Jayco	15
8	Maurice Ballerstedt (GER)	Alpecin–Deceuninck	13
9	Nicola Conci (ITA)	Alpecin–Deceuninck	13
10	Quinten Hermans (BEL)	Intermarché–Wanty–Gobert Matériaux	13

=== Mountains classification ===
Final mountains classification (1–10)
Rank	Rider	Team	Points
1	Stephen Bassett (USA)	Human Powered Health	19
2	Aaron Van Poucke (BEL)	Sport Vlaanderen–Baloise	17
3	Andreas Leknessund (NOR)	Team DSM	16
4	Håkon Aalrust (NOR)	Team Coop	6
5	Alessandro Verre (ITA)	Arkéa–Samsic	6
6	Victor Lafay (FRA)	Cofidis	7
7	Tom Wirtgen (LUX)	Bingoal Pauwels Sauces WB	5
8	Fabien Grellier (FRA)	Team TotalEnergies	5
9	Nicola Conci (ITA)	Alpecin–Deceuninck	4
10	Maurice Ballerstedt (GER)	Alpecin–Deceuninck	4

=== Young rider classification ===
Final young rider classification (1–10)
Rank	Rider	Team	Time
1	Andreas Leknessund (NOR)	Team DSM	16h 11' 32"
2	Nicola Conci (ITA)	Alpecin–Deceuninck	+ 9"
3	Axel Zingle (FRA)	Cofidis	+ 14"
4	Kévin Vauquelin (FRA)	Arkéa–Samsic	+ 22"
5	Max Poole (GBR)	Team DSM	+ 23"
6	Mathieu Burgaudeau (FRA)	Team TotalEnergies	+ 43"
7	Andreas Stokbro (DEN)	Team Coop	+ 53"
8	Axel Laurance (FRA)	B&B Hotels–KTM	+ 58"
9	Kevin Colleoni (ITA)	Team BikeExchange–Jayco	+ 1' 02"
10	Mark Donovan (GBR)	Team DSM	+ 1' 02"

=== Team classification ===
Final team classification (1–10)
Rank	Team	Time
1	Alpecin–Deceuninck	48h 35' 56"
2	Israel–Premier Tech	+ 7"
3	Team DSM	+ 21"
4	Team TotalEnergies	+ 2' 45"
5	B&B Hotels–KTM	+ 5' 41"
6	Team BikeExchange–Jayco	+ 6' 27"
7	Cofidis	+ 7' 40"
8	Astana Qazaqstan Team	+ 7' 47"
9	Uno-X Pro Cycling Team	+ 8' 37"
10	Intermarché–Wanty–Gobert Matériaux	+ 10' 18"
