= 2021 Tour of Norway =

2021 UCI Europe Tour 2021 UCI ProSeries

Race details
- Dates: 19 – 22 August 2021 (Note: The race was originally scheduled for 19 to 24 May, but due to the COVID-19 pandemic, it had to be postponed, shortened, and rescheduled.)
- Stages: 4
- Distance: 653.5 km (406.1 mi)
- Winning time: 15h 15' 00"

Results
Jersey awarded to the overall winner	Winner	Ethan Hayter (GBR)	(INEOS Grenadiers)
	Second	Ide Schelling (NED)	(Bora–Hansgrohe)
	Third	Mike Teunissen (NED)	(Team Jumbo–Visma)
Jersey awarded to the points classification winner	Points	Mike Teunissen (NED)	(Team Jumbo–Visma)
Jersey awarded to the mountains classification winner	Mountains	Anthon Charmig (DEN)	(Uno-X Pro Cycling Team)
Jersey awarded to the young rider classification winner	Young rider	Mattias Skjelmose Jensen (DEN)	(Trek–Segafredo)
	Team	Uno-X Pro Cycling Team	

The 2021 Tour of Norway was a men's road cycling stage race which took place from 19 to 22 August 2021. It was the 10th edition of the Tour of Norway, which was rated as a 2.Pro event on the 2021 UCI Europe Tour and the 2021 UCI ProSeries calendars. This edition was the race's first in the UCI ProSeries; the 2020 edition was expected to feature in the inaugural UCI ProSeries but was cancelled due to the COVID-19 pandemic.

The race was originally six stages long and scheduled to be held from 19 to 24 May, but it was later reduced to four stages and scheduled to begin instead on 21 May. However, on 16 April, the shortened race was postponed to 19–22 August due to a spike in COVID-19 cases.

== Teams ==
Seven of the 19 UCI WorldTeams, two UCI ProTeams, and ten UCI Continental teams made up the nineteen teams that participated in the race. Sport Vlaanderen–Baloise, with five riders, was the only team to not enter a full squad of six riders. 113 riders started the race, of which 104 finished.

UCI WorldTeams

- Bora–Hansgrohe
- INEOS Grenadiers
- Lotto–Soudal
- Team DSM
- Team Jumbo–Visma
- Trek–Segafredo
- UAE Team Emirates

UCI ProTeams

- Sport Vlaanderen–Baloise
- Uno-X Pro Cycling Team

UCI Continental Teams

- Abloc CT
- BHS–PL Beton Bornholm
- Black Spoke Pro Cycling
- EvoPro Racing
- Global 6 Cycling
- Nippo–Provence–PTS Conti
- Ribble Weldtite
- Riwal Cycling Team
- Team ColoQuick
- Team Coop

== Schedule ==
Stage characteristics and winners
Stage	Date	Route	Distance	Type	Stage winner
1	19 August	Egersund to Sokndal	150 km (93 mi)	Hilly stage	Ethan Hayter (GBR)
2	20 August	Sirdal to Sirdal	187 km (116 mi)	Flat stage	Ethan Hayter (GBR)
3	21 August	Jørpeland to Jørpeland	160 km (99 mi)	Flat stage	Mads Pedersen (DEN)
4	22 August	Stavanger to Stavanger	156.5 km (97.2 mi)	Hilly stage	Matthew Walls (GBR)
Total			653.5 km (406.1 mi)		

== Stages ==
=== Stage 1 ===
19 August 2021 – Egersund to Sokndal, 150 km (93 mi)

Stage 1 Result
Rank	Rider	Team	Time
1	Ethan Hayter (GBR)	INEOS Grenadiers	3h 44' 30"
2	Ide Schelling (NED)	Bora–Hansgrohe	+ 1"
3	Torstein Træen (NOR)	Uno-X Pro Cycling Team	+ 11"
4	Mattias Skjelmose Jensen (DEN)	Trek–Segafredo	+ 13"
5	James Shaw (GBR)	Ribble Weldtite	+ 13"
6	Filippo Ganna (ITA)	INEOS Grenadiers	+ 13"
7	Mike Teunissen (NED)	Team Jumbo–Visma	+ 13"
8	Kristian Aasvold (NOR)	Team Coop	+ 13"
9	Markus Hoelgaard (NOR)	Uno-X Pro Cycling Team	+ 13"
10	Lucas Eriksson (SWE)	Riwal Cycling Team	+ 13"

General classification after Stage 1
Rank	Rider	Team	Time
1	Ethan Hayter (GBR)	INEOS Grenadiers	3h 44' 20"
2	Ide Schelling (NED)	Bora–Hansgrohe	+ 5"
3	Torstein Træen (NOR)	Uno-X Pro Cycling Team	+ 17"
4	Mattias Skjelmose Jensen (DEN)	Trek–Segafredo	+ 23"
5	James Shaw (GBR)	Ribble Weldtite	+ 23"
6	Filippo Ganna (ITA)	INEOS Grenadiers	+ 23"
7	Mike Teunissen (NED)	Team Jumbo–Visma	+ 23"
8	Kristian Aasvold (NOR)	Team Coop	+ 23"
9	Markus Hoelgaard (NOR)	Uno-X Pro Cycling Team	+ 23"
10	Lucas Eriksson (SWE)	Riwal Cycling Team	+ 23"

=== Stage 2 ===
20 August 2021 – Sirdal to Sirdal, 187 km (116 mi)

Stage 2 Result
Rank	Rider	Team	Time
1	Ethan Hayter (GBR)	INEOS Grenadiers	4h 16' 32"
2	Tosh Van der Sande (BEL)	Lotto–Soudal	+ 0"
3	Mike Teunissen (NED)	Team Jumbo–Visma	+ 0"
4	Ide Schelling (NED)	Bora–Hansgrohe	+ 0"
5	Sven Erik Bystrøm (NOR)	UAE Team Emirates	+ 0"
6	Kristian Aasvold (NOR)	Team Coop	+ 0"
7	James Shaw (GBR)	Ribble Weldtite	+ 0"
8	Markus Hoelgaard (NOR)	Uno-X Pro Cycling Team	+ 0"
9	Lucas Eriksson (SWE)	Riwal Cycling Team	+ 0"
10	Nick van der Lijke (NED)	Riwal Cycling Team	+ 0"

General classification after Stage 2
Rank	Rider	Team	Time
1	Ethan Hayter (GBR)	INEOS Grenadiers	8h 00' 42"
2	Ide Schelling (NED)	Bora–Hansgrohe	+ 15"
3	Mike Teunissen (NED)	Team Jumbo–Visma	+ 29"
4	James Shaw (GBR)	Ribble Weldtite	+ 33"
5	Kristian Aasvold (NOR)	Team Coop	+ 33"
6	Markus Hoelgaard (NOR)	Uno-X Pro Cycling Team	+ 33"
7	Mattias Skjelmose Jensen (DEN)	Trek–Segafredo	+ 33"
8	Lucas Eriksson (SWE)	Riwal Cycling Team	+ 33"
9	Torstein Træen (NOR)	Uno-X Pro Cycling Team	+ 35"
10	Sven Erik Bystrøm (NOR)	UAE Team Emirates	+ 41"

=== Stage 3 ===
21 August 2021 – Jørpeland to Jørpeland, 160 km (99 mi)

Stage 3 Result
Rank	Rider	Team	Time
1	Mads Pedersen (DEN)	Trek–Segafredo	3h 49' 02"
2	Alexander Kristoff (NOR)	UAE Team Emirates	+ 0"
3	Mike Teunissen (NED)	Team Jumbo–Visma	+ 0"
4	Markus Hoelgaard (NOR)	Uno-X Pro Cycling Team	+ 0"
5	Ethan Hayter (GBR)	INEOS Grenadiers	+ 0"
6	Kristian Aasvold (NOR)	Team Coop	+ 0"
7	Tosh Van der Sande (BEL)	Lotto–Soudal	+ 0"
8	Nils Politt (GER)	Bora–Hansgrohe	+ 0"
9	Cédric Beullens (BEL)	Sport Vlaanderen–Baloise	+ 0"
10	Ide Schelling (NED)	Bora–Hansgrohe	+ 0"

General classification after Stage 3
Rank	Rider	Team	Time
1	Ethan Hayter (GBR)	INEOS Grenadiers	11h 49' 44"
2	Ide Schelling (NED)	Bora–Hansgrohe	+ 15"
3	Mike Teunissen (NED)	Team Jumbo–Visma	+ 25"
4	Kristian Aasvold (NOR)	Team Coop	+ 33"
5	Markus Hoelgaard (NOR)	Uno-X Pro Cycling Team	+ 33"
6	James Shaw (GBR)	Ribble Weldtite	+ 33"
7	Lucas Eriksson (SWE)	Riwal Cycling Team	+ 33"
8	Mattias Skjelmose Jensen (DEN)	Trek–Segafredo	+ 33"
9	Torstein Træen (NOR)	Uno-X Pro Cycling Team	+ 35"
10	Romain Combaud (FRA)	Team DSM	+ 41"

=== Stage 4 ===
22 August 2021 – Stavanger to Stavanger, 156.5 km (97.2 mi)

Stage 4 Result
Rank	Rider	Team	Time
1	Matthew Walls (GBR)	Bora–Hansgrohe	3h 25' 16"
2	Mads Pedersen (DEN)	Trek–Segafredo	+ 0"
3	Daniel Hoelgaard (NOR)	Uno-X Pro Cycling Team	+ 0"
4	Mike Teunissen (NED)	Team Jumbo–Visma	+ 0"
5	Tosh Van der Sande (BEL)	Lotto–Soudal	+ 0"
6	Alexander Kristoff (NOR)	UAE Team Emirates	+ 0"
7	Nils Broge (DEN)	BHS–PL Beton Bornholm	+ 0"
8	Markus Hoelgaard (NOR)	Uno-X Pro Cycling Team	+ 0"
9	Nick van der Lijke (NED)	Riwal Cycling Team	+ 0"
10	Cédric Beullens (BEL)	Sport Vlaanderen–Baloise	+ 0"

General classification after Stage 4
Rank	Rider	Team	Time
1	Ethan Hayter (GBR)	INEOS Grenadiers	15h 15' 00"
2	Ide Schelling (NED)	Bora–Hansgrohe	+ 15"
3	Mike Teunissen (NED)	Team Jumbo–Visma	+ 25"
4	Markus Hoelgaard (NOR)	Uno-X Pro Cycling Team	+ 33"
5	James Shaw (GBR)	Ribble Weldtite	+ 33"
6	Kristian Aasvold (NOR)	Team Coop	+ 33"
7	Mattias Skjelmose Jensen (DEN)	Trek–Segafredo	+ 33"
8	Lucas Eriksson (SWE)	Riwal Cycling Team	+ 33"
9	Torstein Træen (NOR)	Uno-X Pro Cycling Team	+ 35"
10	Sven Erik Bystrøm (NOR)	UAE Team Emirates	+ 41"

== Classification leadership table ==
Classification leadership by stage
Stage	Winner	General classification	Points classification	Mountains classification	Young rider classification	Team classification
1	Ethan Hayter	Ethan Hayter	Ethan Hayter	Ethan Hayter	Mattias Skjelmose Jensen	INEOS Grenadiers
2	Ethan Hayter	Ethan Hayter	Ethan Hayter	Anthon Charmig	Mattias Skjelmose Jensen	Uno-X Pro Cycling Team
3	Mads Pedersen	Ethan Hayter	Ethan Hayter	Anthon Charmig	Mattias Skjelmose Jensen	Uno-X Pro Cycling Team
4	Matthew Walls	Ethan Hayter	Mike Teunissen	Anthon Charmig	Mattias Skjelmose Jensen	Uno-X Pro Cycling Team
Final		Ethan Hayter	Mike Teunissen	Anthon Charmig	Mattias Skjelmose Jensen	Uno-X Pro Cycling Team

- On stages 2 and 3, Ide Schelling, who was second in the points classification, wore the dark blue jersey, because first-placed Ethan Hayter wore the orange jersey as the leader of the general classification. For the same reason, Mike Teunissen wore the dark blue jersey on stage 4, and Anthon Charmig, who was second in the mountains classification, wore the polka-dot jersey on stage 2.

== Final classification standings ==
Legend
Denotes the winner of the general classification	Denotes the winner of the mountains classification
Denotes the winner of the points classification	Denotes the winner of the young rider classification

=== General classification ===
Final general classification (1–10)
Rank	Rider	Team	Time
1	Ethan Hayter (GBR)	INEOS Grenadiers	15h 15' 00"
2	Ide Schelling (NED)	Bora–Hansgrohe	+ 15"
3	Mike Teunissen (NED)	Team Jumbo–Visma	+ 25"
4	Markus Hoelgaard (NOR)	Uno-X Pro Cycling Team	+ 33"
5	James Shaw (GBR)	Ribble Weldtite	+ 33"
6	Kristian Aasvold (NOR)	Team Coop	+ 33"
7	Mattias Skjelmose Jensen (DEN)	Trek–Segafredo	+ 33"
8	Lucas Eriksson (SWE)	Riwal Cycling Team	+ 33"
9	Torstein Træen (NOR)	Uno-X Pro Cycling Team	+ 35"
10	Sven Erik Bystrøm (NOR)	UAE Team Emirates	+ 41"

=== Points classification ===
Final points classification (1–10)
Rank	Rider	Team	Points
1	Mike Teunissen (NED)	Team Jumbo–Visma	47
2	Ethan Hayter (GBR)	INEOS Grenadiers	41
3	Markus Hoelgaard (NOR)	Uno-X Pro Cycling Team	35
4	Tosh Van der Sande (BEL)	Lotto–Soudal	34
5	Ide Schelling (NED)	Bora–Hansgrohe	32
6	Mads Pedersen (DEN)	Trek–Segafredo	29
7	Kristian Aasvold (NOR)	Team Coop	28
8	James Shaw (GBR)	Ribble Weldtite	27
9	Alexander Kristoff (NOR)	UAE Team Emirates	24
10	Sven Erik Bystrøm (NOR)	UAE Team Emirates	18

=== Mountains classification ===
Final mountains classification (1–10)
Rank	Rider	Team	Points
1	Anthon Charmig (DEN)	Uno-X Pro Cycling Team	22
2	Olav Hjemsæter (NOR)	Team Coop	14
3	Nils Broge (DEN)	BHS–PL Beton Bornholm	12
4	Mads Rahbek (DEN)	BHS–PL Beton Bornholm	9
5	Emil Iwersen (DEN)	BHS–PL Beton Bornholm	8
6	Ethan Hayter (GBR)	INEOS Grenadiers	7
7	Aaron Verwilst (BEL)	Sport Vlaanderen–Baloise	6
8	James Fouché (NZL)	Black Spoke Pro Cycling	6
9	Ide Schelling (NED)	Bora–Hansgrohe	5
10	Julian Mertens (BEL)	Sport Vlaanderen–Baloise	5

=== Young rider classification ===
Final young rider classification (1–10)
Rank	Rider	Team	Time
1	Mattias Skjelmose Jensen (DEN)	Trek–Segafredo	15h 15' 33"
2	Mark Donovan (GBR)	Team DSM	+ 20"
3	Joshua Kench (NZL)	Black Spoke Pro Cycling	+ 47"
4	Meindert Weulink (NED)	Abloc CT	+ 49"
5	Andreas Leknessund (NOR)	Team DSM	+ 1' 10"
6	Finn Fisher-Black (NZL)	UAE Team Emirates	+ 2' 12"
7	Sébastien Grignard (BEL)	Lotto–Soudal	+ 13' 42"
8	Ward Vanhoof (BEL)	Sport Vlaanderen–Baloise	+ 13' 57"
9	Oscar Onley (GBR)	Team DSM	+ 15' 03"
10	Frederik Jensen (DEN)	BHS–PL Beton Bornholm	+ 21' 34"

=== Team classification ===
Final team classification (1–10)
Rank	Team	Time
1	Uno-X Pro Cycling Team	45h 46' 58"
2	Riwal Cycling Team	+ 16"
3	Team DSM	+ 39"
4	INEOS Grenadiers	+ 2' 29"
5	Sport Vlaanderen–Baloise	+ 3' 28"
6	UAE Team Emirates	+ 3' 30"
7	Team Coop	+ 8' 16"
8	Team Jumbo–Visma	+ 8' 56"
9	Lotto–Soudal	+ 15' 28"
10	Trek–Segafredo	+ 16' 19"
