= 2020 Tour de Luxembourg =

2020 UCI Europe Tour 2020 UCI ProSeries

Race details
- Dates: 15 – 19 September 2020
- Stages: 5
- Distance: 716.5 km (445.2 mi)
- Winning time: 16h 32' 39"

Results
Jersey awarded to the overall winner	Winner	Diego Ulissi (ITA)	(UAE Team Emirates)
	Second	Markus Hoelgaard (NOR)	(Uno-X Pro Cycling Team)
	Third	Aimé De Gendt (BEL)	(Circus–Wanty Gobert)
Jersey awarded to the points classification winner	Points	Diego Ulissi (ITA)	(UAE Team Emirates)
Jersey awarded to the mountains classification winner	Mountains	Baptiste Planckaert (BEL)	(Bingoal–Wallonie Bruxelles)
Jersey awarded to the youth classification winner	Youth	Andreas Kron (DEN)	(Riwal Securitas)
	Team	AG2R La Mondiale	

The 2020 Tour de Luxembourg was the 80th edition of the Tour de Luxembourg road cycling stage race. It was held between 15 and 19 September, as part of the 2020 UCI Europe Tour and the 2020 UCI ProSeries.

== Schedule ==
Stage characteristics and winners
Stage	Date	Route	Distance	Type	Winner
1	15 September	Luxembourg City to Luxembourg City	133.5 km (83.0 mi)	Hilly stage	Diego Ulissi (ITA)
2	16 September	Remich to Hesperange	~~160.8 km (99.9 mi)~~ 40.7 km (25.3 mi)	Hilly stage	Arnaud Démare (FRA)
3	17 September	Rosport to Schifflange	164.3 km (102.1 mi)	Hilly stage	John Degenkolb (GER)
4	18 September	Rodange to Differdange	201 km (125 mi)	Hilly stage	Diego Ulissi (ITA)
5	19 September	Mersch to Luxembourg City	177 km (110 mi)	Hilly stage	Andreas Kron (DEN)
Total		~~836.6 km (519.8 mi)~~ 716.5 km (445.2 mi)			

== Teams ==
Eight UCI WorldTeams, twelve UCI ProTeams, and three UCI Continental teams made up the twenty-three teams that participated the race. Each team entered six riders, except for Leopard Pro Cycling, which entered five, for a starting peloton of 138 riders. 103 of these riders finished the race.

UCI WorldTeams

- AG2R La Mondiale
- Astana
- Bahrain–McLaren
- Groupama–FDJ
- Lotto–Soudal
- NTT Pro Cycling
- Trek–Segafredo
- UAE Team Emirates

UCI ProTeams

- Alpecin–Fenix
- Arkéa–Samsic
- Bardiani–CSF–Faizanè
- Bingoal–Wallonie Bruxelles
- Burgos BH
- Caja Rural–Seguros RGA
- Circus–Wanty Gobert
- Nippo–Delko–One Provence
- Riwal Securitas
- Sport Vlaanderen–Baloise
- Uno-X Pro Cycling Team
- Vini Zabù–KTM

UCI Continental Teams

- Leopard Pro Cycling
- Natura4Ever–Roubaix–Lille Métropole
- Team Vorarlberg Santic

== Stages ==
=== Stage 1 ===
15 September 2020 — Luxembourg City to Luxembourg City, 133.5 km (83.0 mi)

Stage 1 Result
Rank	Rider	Team	Time
1	Diego Ulissi (ITA)	UAE Team Emirates	3h 13' 15"
2	Amaury Capiot (BEL)	Sport Vlaanderen–Baloise	+ 0"
3	Eduard-Michael Grosu (ROU)	Nippo–Delko–One Provence	+ 0"
4	Jon Aberasturi (ESP)	Caja Rural–Seguros RGA	+ 0"
5	Jasper Philipsen (BEL)	UAE Team Emirates	+ 0"
6	Rui Oliveira (POR)	UAE Team Emirates	+ 0"
7	Alexander Krieger (GER)	Alpecin–Fenix	+ 0"
8	Eros Capecchi (ITA)	Bahrain–McLaren	+ 0"
9	Markus Hoelgaard (NOR)	Uno-X Pro Cycling Team	+ 0"
10	Jordi Warlop (BEL)	Sport Vlaanderen–Baloise	+ 0"

General classification after Stage 1
Rank	Rider	Team	Time
1	Diego Ulissi (ITA)	UAE Team Emirates	3h 13' 02"
2	Amaury Capiot (BEL)	Sport Vlaanderen–Baloise	+ 7"
3	Eduard-Michael Grosu (ROU)	Nippo–Delko–One Provence	+ 7"
4	Petr Vakoč (CZE)	Alpecin–Fenix	+ 12"
5	Jon Aberasturi (ESP)	Caja Rural–Seguros RGA	+ 13"
6	Jasper Philipsen (BEL)	UAE Team Emirates	+ 13"
7	Rui Oliveira (POR)	UAE Team Emirates	+ 13"
8	Alexander Krieger (GER)	Alpecin–Fenix	+ 13"
9	Eros Capecchi (ITA)	Bahrain–McLaren	+ 13"
10	Markus Hoelgaard (NOR)	Uno-X Pro Cycling Team	+ 13"

=== Stage 2 ===
16 September 2020 — Remich to Hesperange, ~~160.8 km (99.9 mi)~~ 40.7 km (25.3 mi)

Riders held a protest during the opening kilometers of the stage to voice several of their safety concerns about the previous stage. They pointed out that there were parked vehicles, as well as a bus that was stopped on the road with under five kilometers to go. Lithuanian rider Ignatas Konovalovas of Groupama–FDJ had even found himself having to stop for a red light towards the end of that stage when the roads were opened back up to traffic prematurely. Riders had spoken to race organizers about these hazards before stage 2, but when they encountered further problems on stage 2, they stopped. It was only after negotiations with race organizers and UCI did the riders agree to resume, but only after neutralizing the 80 kilometer route to Syren and only resume racing in the final 42 kilometers in the circuit around Hesperange.

Stage 2 Result
Rank	Rider	Team	Time
1	Arnaud Démare (FRA)	Groupama–FDJ	50' 06"
2	Jasper Philipsen (BEL)	UAE Team Emirates	+ 0"
3	Alexander Krieger (GER)	Alpecin–Fenix	+ 0"
4	Jordi Warlop (BEL)	Sport Vlaanderen–Baloise	+ 0"
5	Amaury Capiot (BEL)	Sport Vlaanderen–Baloise	+ 0"
6	Jacopo Guarnieri (ITA)	Groupama–FDJ	+ 0"
7	Eduard-Michael Grosu (ROU)	Nippo–Delko–One Provence	+ 0"
8	Rui Oliveira (POR)	UAE Team Emirates	+ 0"
9	Martijn Budding (NED)	Riwal Securitas	+ 0"
10	Reinardt Janse van Rensburg (RSA)	NTT Pro Cycling	+ 0"

General classification after Stage 2
Rank	Rider	Team	Time
1	Diego Ulissi (ITA)	UAE Team Emirates	4h 03' 11"
2	Jasper Philipsen (BEL)	UAE Team Emirates	+ 4"
3	Amaury Capiot (BEL)	Sport Vlaanderen–Baloise	+ 4"
4	Eduard-Michael Grosu (ROU)	Nippo–Delko–One Provence	+ 4"
5	Alexander Krieger (GER)	Alpecin–Fenix	+ 6"
6	Rui Oliveira (POR)	UAE Team Emirates	+ 7"
7	Jordi Warlop (BEL)	Sport Vlaanderen–Baloise	+ 10"
8	Reinardt Janse van Rensburg (RSA)	NTT Pro Cycling	+ 10"
9	Petr Vakoč (CZE)	Alpecin–Fenix	+ 12"
10	Jon Aberasturi (ESP)	Caja Rural–Seguros RGA	+ 13"

=== Stage 3 ===
17 September 2020 — Rosport to Schifflange, 164.3 km (102.1 mi)

Stage 3 Result
Rank	Rider	Team	Time
1	John Degenkolb (GER)	Lotto–Soudal	3h 35' 43"
2	Eduard-Michael Grosu (ROU)	Nippo–Delko–One Provence	+ 0"
3	Pieter Vanspeybrouck (BEL)	Circus–Wanty Gobert	+ 0"
4	Reinardt Janse van Rensburg (RSA)	NTT Pro Cycling	+ 0"
5	Yevgeniy Gidich (KAZ)	Astana	+ 0"
6	August Jensen (NOR)	Riwal Securitas	+ 0"
7	Amaury Capiot (BEL)	Sport Vlaanderen–Baloise	+ 0"
8	Jordi Warlop (BEL)	Sport Vlaanderen–Baloise	+ 0"
9	Lawrence Naesen (BEL)	AG2R La Mondiale	+ 0"
10	Alexander Krieger (GER)	Alpecin–Fenix	+ 0"

General classification after Stage 3
Rank	Rider	Team	Time
1	Eduard-Michael Grosu (ROU)	Nippo–Delko–One Provence	7h 38' 49"
2	Diego Ulissi (ITA)	UAE Team Emirates	+ 5"
3	Amaury Capiot (BEL)	Sport Vlaanderen–Baloise	+ 9"
4	Alexander Krieger (GER)	Alpecin–Fenix	+ 11"
5	Vincenzo Albanese (ITA)	Bardiani–CSF–Faizanè	+ 12"
6	Rui Oliveira (POR)	UAE Team Emirates	+ 12"
7	Jordi Warlop (BEL)	Sport Vlaanderen–Baloise	+ 15"
8	Reinardt Janse van Rensburg (RSA)	NTT Pro Cycling	+ 15"
8	Tim Wellens (BEL)	Lotto–Soudal	+ 16"
10	Jan Bakelants (BEL)	Circus–Wanty Gobert	+ 17"

=== Stage 4 ===
18 September 2020 — Rodange to Differdange, 201 km (125 mi)

Stage 4 Result
Rank	Rider	Team	Time
1	Diego Ulissi (ITA)	UAE Team Emirates	4h 45' 23"
2	Aimé De Gendt (BEL)	Circus–Wanty Gobert	+ 0"
3	Markus Hoelgaard (NOR)	Uno-X Pro Cycling Team	+ 0"
4	Tim Wellens (BEL)	Lotto–Soudal	+ 0"
5	Alexander Krieger (GER)	Alpecin–Fenix	+ 15"
6	Jan Bakelants (BEL)	Circus–Wanty Gobert	+ 15"
7	Mauro Schmid (LUX)	Leopard Pro Cycling	+ 15"
8	Vadim Pronskiy (KAZ)	Astana	+ 15"
9	Aurélien Paret-Peintre (FRA)	AG2R La Mondiale	+ 15"
10	Andreas Kron (DEN)	Riwal Securitas	+ 15"

General classification after Stage 4
Rank	Rider	Team	Time
1	Diego Ulissi (ITA)	UAE Team Emirates	12h 24' 07"
2	Aimé De Gendt (BEL)	Circus–Wanty Gobert	+ 17"
3	Markus Hoelgaard (NOR)	Uno-X Pro Cycling Team	+ 19"
4	Tim Wellens (BEL)	Lotto–Soudal	+ 21"
5	Alexander Krieger (GER)	Alpecin–Fenix	+ 31"
6	Jan Bakelants (BEL)	Circus–Wanty Gobert	+ 34"
7	Aurélien Paret-Peintre (FRA)	AG2R La Mondiale	+ 38"
8	Clément Champoussin (FRA)	AG2R La Mondiale	+ 38"
9	Mauro Schmid (LUX)	Leopard Pro Cycling	+ 38"
10	Andreas Kron (DEN)	Riwal Securitas	+ 38"

=== Stage 5 ===
19 September 2020 — Mersch to Luxembourg City, 177 km (110 mi)

Stage 5 Result
Rank	Rider	Team	Time
1	Andreas Kron (DEN)	Riwal Securitas	4h 08' 42"
2	Diego Ulissi (ITA)	UAE Team Emirates	+ 0"
3	Markus Hoelgaard (NOR)	Uno-X Pro Cycling Team	+ 0"
4	Jan Bakelants (BEL)	Circus–Wanty Gobert	+ 0"
5	Petr Vakoč (CZE)	Alpecin–Fenix	+ 0"
6	Clément Champoussin (FRA)	AG2R La Mondiale	+ 0"
7	Aimé De Gendt (BEL)	Circus–Wanty Gobert	+ 0"
8	Franck Bonnamour (FRA)	Arkéa–Samsic	+ 6"
9	Alexander Krieger (GER)	Alpecin–Fenix	+ 6"
10	Romain Hardy (FRA)	Arkéa–Samsic	+ 6"

General classification after Stage 5
Rank	Rider	Team	Time
1	Diego Ulissi (ITA)	UAE Team Emirates	16h 32' 39"
2	Markus Hoelgaard (NOR)	Uno-X Pro Cycling Team	+ 25"
3	Aimé De Gendt (BEL)	Circus–Wanty Gobert	+ 27"
4	Tim Wellens (BEL)	Lotto–Soudal	+ 35"
5	Andreas Kron (DEN)	Riwal Securitas	+ 38"
6	Jan Bakelants (BEL)	Circus–Wanty Gobert	+ 44"
7	Alexander Krieger (GER)	Alpecin–Fenix	+ 47"
8	Clément Champoussin (FRA)	AG2R La Mondiale	+ 48"
9	Petr Vakoč (CZE)	Alpecin–Fenix	+ 50"
10	Aurélien Paret-Peintre (FRA)	AG2R La Mondiale	+ 54"

== Classification leadership table ==
Classification leadership by stage
Stage	Winner	General classification	Points classification	Mountains classification	Young rider classification	Teams classification
1	Diego Ulissi	Diego Ulissi	Diego Ulissi	Axel Zingle	Jasper Philipsen	UAE Team Emirates
2	Arnaud Démare	Diego Ulissi	Jasper Philipsen	Axel Zingle	Jasper Philipsen	UAE Team Emirates
3	John Degenkolb	Eduard-Michael Grosu	Eduard-Michael Grosu	Baptiste Planckaert	Vincenzo Albanese	Riwal Securitas
4	Diego Ulissi	Diego Ulissi	Diego Ulissi	Sergio Martín	Aurélien Paret-Peintre	Circus–Wanty Gobert
5	Andreas Kron	Diego Ulissi	Diego Ulissi	Baptiste Planckaert	Andreas Kron	AG2R La Mondiale
Final		Diego Ulissi	Diego Ulissi	Baptiste Planckaert	Andreas Kron	AG2R La Mondiale

== Final classification standings ==
Legend
Denotes the winner of the general classification	Denotes the winner of the mountains classification
Denotes the winner of the points classification	Denotes the winner of the young rider classification

=== General classification ===
Final general classification (1–10)
Rank	Rider	Team	Time
1	Diego Ulissi (ITA)	UAE Team Emirates	16h 32' 39"
2	Markus Hoelgaard (NOR)	Uno-X Pro Cycling Team	+ 25"
3	Aimé De Gendt (BEL)	Circus–Wanty Gobert	+ 27"
4	Tim Wellens (BEL)	Lotto–Soudal	+ 35"
5	Andreas Kron (DEN)	Riwal Securitas	+ 38"
6	Jan Bakelants (BEL)	Circus–Wanty Gobert	+ 44"
7	Alexander Krieger (GER)	Alpecin–Fenix	+ 47"
8	Clément Champoussin (FRA)	AG2R La Mondiale	+ 48"
9	Petr Vakoč (CZE)	Alpecin–Fenix	+ 50"
10	Aurélien Paret-Peintre (FRA)	AG2R La Mondiale	+ 54"

=== Points classification ===
Final points classification (1–10)
Rank	Rider	Team	Points
1	Diego Ulissi (ITA)	UAE Team Emirates	56
2	Alexander Krieger (GER)	Alpecin–Fenix	30
3	Markus Hoelgaard (NOR)	Uno-X Pro Cycling Team	28
4	Andreas Kron (DEN)	Riwal Securitas	21
5	Aimé De Gendt (BEL)	Circus–Wanty Gobert	21
6	John Degenkolb (GER)	Lotto–Soudal	20
7	Arnaud Démare (FRA)	Groupama–FDJ	20
8	Jan Bakelants (BEL)	Circus–Wanty Gobert	18
9	Jordi Warlop (BEL)	Sport Vlaanderen–Baloise	15
10	Pieter Vanspeybrouck (BEL)	Circus–Wanty Gobert	13

=== Mountains classification ===
Final mountains classification (1–10)
Rank	Rider	Team	Points
1	Baptiste Planckaert (BEL)	Bingoal–Wallonie Bruxelles	29
2	Sergio Martín (ESP)	Caja Rural–Seguros RGA	18
3	Diego Ulissi (ITA)	UAE Team Emirates	12
4	Santiago Buitrago (COL)	Bahrain–McLaren	9
5	Clément Champoussin (FRA)	AG2R La Mondiale	8
6	Xandro Meurisse (BEL)	Circus–Wanty Gobert	8
7	Etienne van Empel (NED)	Vini Zabù–KTM	8
8	François Bidard (FRA)	AG2R La Mondiale	7
9	Andreas Kron (DEN)	Riwal Securitas	7
10	Johannes Schinnagel (GER)	Team Vorarlberg Santic	7

=== Young rider classification ===
Final young rider classification (1–10)
Rank	Rider	Team	Time
1	Andreas Kron (DEN)	Riwal Securitas	16h 33' 17"
2	Clément Champoussin (FRA)	AG2R La Mondiale	+ 10"
3	Aurélien Paret-Peintre (FRA)	AG2R La Mondiale	+ 16"
4	Mauro Schmid (LUX)	Leopard Pro Cycling	+ 21"
5	Vadim Pronskiy (KAZ)	Astana	+ 27"
6	Santiago Buitrago (COL)	Bahrain–McLaren	+ 1' 48"
7	Jan Maas (NED)	Leopard Pro Cycling	+ 2' 35"
8	Ivan Centrone (LUX)	Natura4Ever–Roubaix–Lille Métropole	+ 2' 42"
9	Jordi Warlop (BEL)	Sport Vlaanderen–Baloise	+ 2' 48"
10	Senne Leysen (BEL)	Alpecin–Fenix	+ 3' 02"

=== Teams classification ===
Final teams classification (1–10)
Rank	Team	Time
1	AG2R La Mondiale	49h 42' 17"
2	Alpecin–Fenix	+ 1' 02"
3	Circus–Wanty Gobert	+ 3' 16"
4	Lotto–Soudal	+ 3' 27"
5	Arkéa–Samsic	+ 3' 32"
6	Bingoal–Wallonie Bruxelles	+ 5' 32"
7	Sport Vlaanderen–Baloise	+ 7' 37"
8	Riwal Securitas	+ 10' 52"
9	NTT Pro Cycling	+ 10' 55"
10	Astana	+ 12' 15"
