= Markus Hoelgaard =

Norwegian cyclist

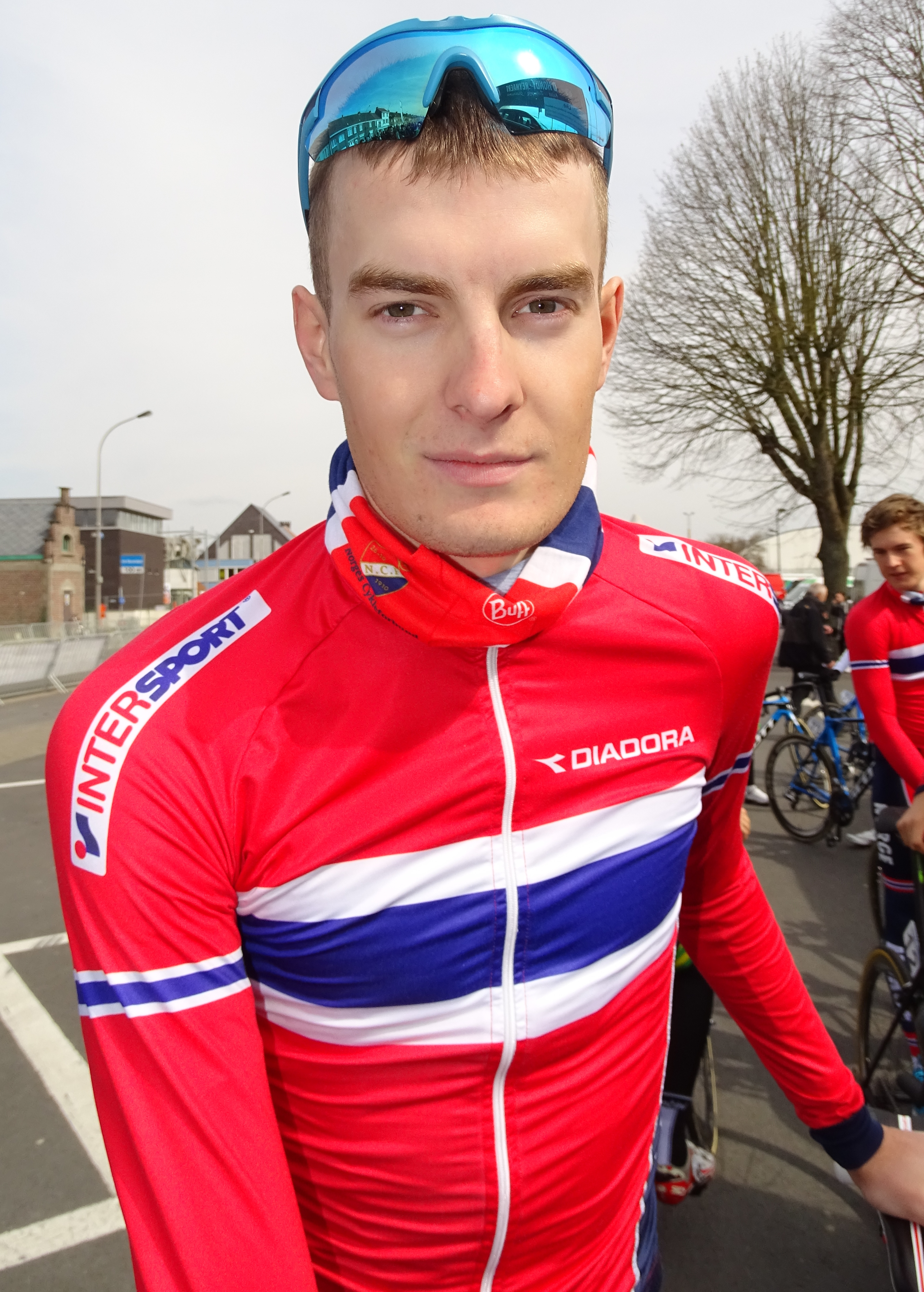
- Hoelgaard in 2016

Personal information
- Born: 4 October 1994 (age 32) Stavanger, Norway
- Height: 1.88 m (6 ft 2 in)
- Weight: 74 kg (163 lb)

Cycling career
- Sport: Cycling
- Current team: Uno-X Mobility
- Discipline: Road
- Role: Rider

Professional teams
- 2013–2014: Etixx–IHNed
- 2015: Team Coop–Øster Hus
- 2016–2018: Team Joker
- 2019–2021: Uno-X Norwegian Development Team
- 2022–2023: Trek–Segafredo
- 2024–: Uno-X Mobility

Major wins
- One-day races and Classics National Road Race Championships (2024)

Markus Hoelgaard (born 4 October 1994) is a Norwegian racing cyclist, who currently rides for UCI ProTeam Uno-X Mobility. He rode at the 2013 UCI Road World Championships. He is the brother of fellow racing cyclist Daniel Hoelgaard.

== Major results ==
2012
National Junior Road Championships

3rd Road race
3rd Time trial

5th Paris–Roubaix Juniors
2014
2nd Grand Prix Královéhradeckého kraje
8th GP Czech Republic
2016
2nd Overall ZLM Roompot Tour

1st Stage 1 (TTT)

3rd Road race, National Under-23 Road Championships
7th Ringerike GP
10th Overall Course de la Paix U23
2017
1st Stage 1 Tour Alsace
5th Ringerike GP
6th Druivenkoers Overijse
8th Overall Circuit des Ardennes

1st Stage 1

8th Overall Ronde de l'Oise
2018
2nd Overall Arctic Race of Norway

1st Young rider classification

3rd Gylne Gutuer
8th Grote Prijs Jef Scherens
2019 (1 pro win)
2nd Overall International Tour of Rhodes
3rd Overall Oberösterreich Rundfahrt
7th Overall Arctic Race of Norway

1st Stage 4

2020
2nd Overall Tour de Luxembourg
3rd Overall Czech Cycling Tour
2021 (1)
1st Stage 1 Arctic Race of Norway
2nd Overall CRO Race
4th Overall Tour of Norway
7th Road race, UEC European Road Championships
8th E3 Saxo Bank Classic
2023
1st Mountains classification, Tour de Pologne
2024 (3)
1st Road race, National Road Championships
1st Tour of Leuven
1st Stage 3 Tour de Wallonie
6th Boucles de l'Aulne
9th Tro-Bro Léon
9th Tour du Finistère
10th Eschborn–Frankfurt
2025
3rd Trofeo Serra Tramuntana
4th Trofeo Matteotti
7th Memorial Marco Pantani
8th Paris–Roubaix
9th Overall Vuelta a Andalucía
9th Coppa Bernocchi
9th Muur Classic Geraardsbergen
2026
2nd Road race, National Road Championships
5th Memorial Marco Pantani
9th Coppa Sabatini
