= Stephen Bassett =

American bicycle racer (born 1995)

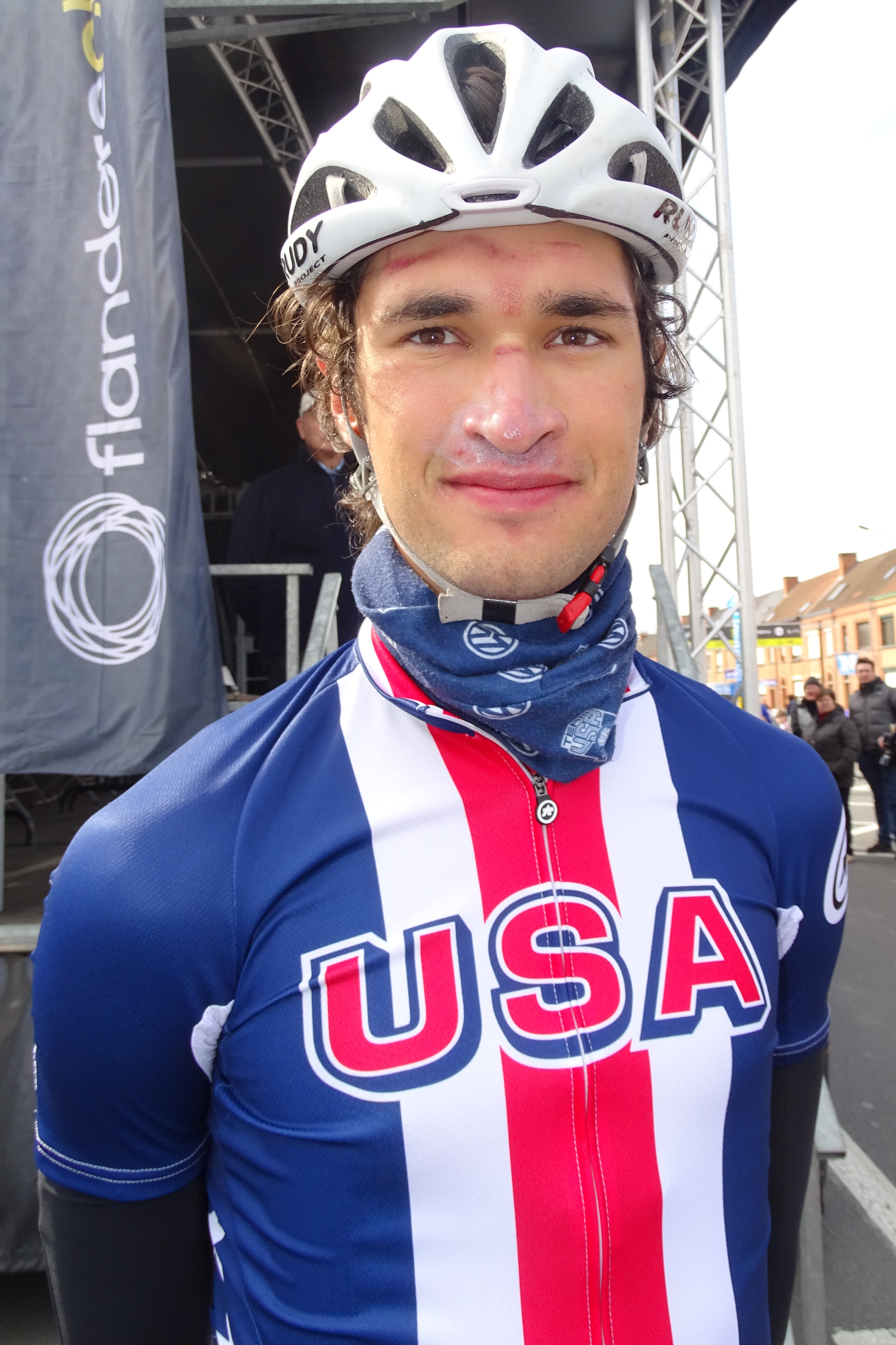
- Bassett at the 2016 Ronde van Vlaanderen Beloften

Personal information
- Born: March 27, 1995 (age 31) Knoxville, Tennessee, United States
- Height: 1.91 m (6 ft 3 in)

Cycling career
- Sport: Cycling
- Current team: Project Echelon Racing
- Discipline: Road
- Role: Rider

Amateur teams
- 2010: Bike Zoo–SCO–Microme
- 2011: Prochain Cycling
- 2012–2013: Texas Roadhouse
- 2014–2015: Hagens Berman U23
- 2019: First Internet Bank

Professional teams
- 2016: Team Jamis
- 2017–2018: Silber Pro Cycling Team
- 2019: Wildlife Generation Pro Cycling p/b Maxxis
- 2020–2023: Rally Cycling
- 2024: Denver Disruptors
- 2024–: Project Echelon Racing

Stephen Bassett (born March 27, 1995) is an American cyclist, who currently rides for UCI Continental team Project Echelon Racing.

== Major results ==
2012
1st Stage 5 Junior Tour of Ireland
2013
2nd Road race, National Junior Road Championships
5th Overall Tour de l'Abitibi
2014
1st Young rider classification, Joe Martin Stage Race
2015
Tour de Namur

1st Young rider classification
1st Stage 1

5th Overall Joe Martin Stage Race
2016
1st Stage 5 Cascade Cycling Classic
2019
1st Overall Joe Martin Stage Race

1st Mountains classification
1st Stages 1 & 3 (ITT)

1st Winston Salem Criterium
1st Stage 3 Redlands Bicycle Classic
2nd Road race, National Road Championships
9th Overall Tour de Hokkaido

1st Stage 2

2021
1st Overall Carter County Omnium

1st Stages 2 & 3

6th Clássica da Arrábida
2022
1st Mountains classification, Arctic Race of Norway
2024
1st National Criterium Championships
2nd Melon City Criterium
3rd Snake Alley Criterium
