= Alexander Krieger =

German cyclist (born 1991)

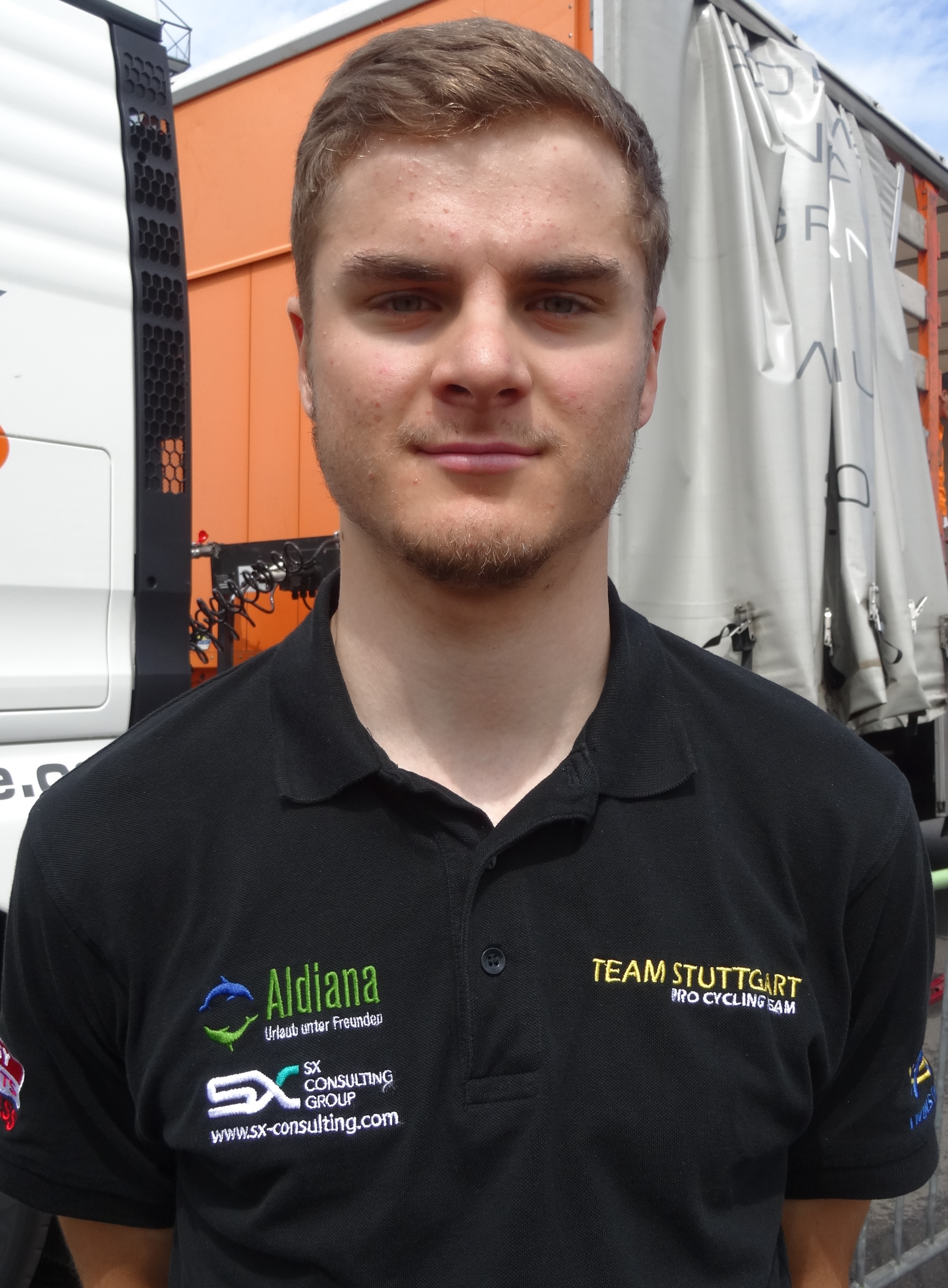
- Krieger in 2014

Personal information
- Full name: Alexander Krieger
- Born: 28 November 1991 (age 34) Stuttgart, Germany
- Height: 1.84 m (6 ft 0 in)
- Weight: 71 kg (157 lb)

Cycling career
- Sport: Cycling
- Discipline: Road
- Role: Rider (retired), Directeur sportif

Amateur team
- 2014: Rádio Popular (stagiaire)

Professional teams
- 2010–2012: Team Heizomat Mapei
- 2013: Rad-Net Rose Team
- 2014: Team Stuttgart
- 2015–2019: Leopard Development Team
- 2020–2023: Alpecin–Deceuninck
- 2024–2025: Tudor Pro Cycling Team

Alexander Krieger (born 28 November 1991 in Stuttgart) is a German former professional cyclist, who last rode for UCI ProTeam Tudor Pro Cycling Team. After retiring, he became a directeur sportif for the Tudor Pro Cycling development team.

== Major results ==
2012
8th Neuseen Classics - Rund um die Braunkohle
2014
2nd Omloop Mandel-Leie-Schelde
4th Road race, National Road Championships
4th Omloop van het Waasland
4th Ronde van Zeeland Seaports
6th Rund um Köln
7th Ronde van Limburg
2015
5th Overall Le Triptyque des Monts et Châteaux
2016
6th Overall Oberösterreich Rundfahrt
6th Grand Prix de la ville de Pérenchies
2017
3rd Midden–Brabant Poort Omloop
4th Bruges Cycling Classic
4th Grand Prix de la ville de Pérenchies
6th Grote Prijs Jean-Pierre Monseré
8th Arno Wallaard Memorial
8th Grote Prijs Jef Scherens
10th Overall Paris–Arras Tour
2018
2nd Overall Tour de Normandie
4th Grand Prix de la ville de Pérenchies
5th Road race, National Road Championships
5th Overall Tour de Luxembourg
6th Overall Circuit des Ardennes
6th Famenne Ardenne Classic
6th Grote Prijs Jean-Pierre Monseré
6th Elfstedenronde
7th Münsterland Giro
7th Paris–Troyes
9th Grote Prijs Marcel Kint
9th Rund um Köln
9th Grand Prix Albert Fauville-Baulet
9th Grote Prijs Jef Scherens
2019
2nd Midden–Brabant Poort Omloop
7th Grote Prijs Marcel Kint
2020
2nd Paris–Chauny
3rd Road race, National Road Championships
4th Antwerp Port Epic
5th Tour du Doubs
7th Overall Tour de Luxembourg

=== Grand Tour general classification results timeline ===
Grand Tour	2021	2022	2023	2024	2025
Giro d'Italia	140	DNF	121	DNF	159
Tour de France	—	103	—	—	—
Vuelta a España	117	—	—	—	—

Legend
—	Did not compete
DNF	Did not finish
IP	Race in Progress
