= 2021 Arctic Race of Norway =

2021 UCI Europe Tour 2021 UCI ProSeries

Race details
- Dates: 5 – 8 August 2021
- Stages: 4
- Distance: 668.5 km (415.4 mi)
- Winning time: 15h 04' 02"

Results
Jersey awarded to the overall winner	Winner	Ben Hermans (BEL)	(Israel Start-Up Nation)
	Second	Odd Christian Eiking (NOR)	(Intermarché–Wanty–Gobert Matériaux)
	Third	Victor Lafay (FRA)	(Cofidis)
Jersey awarded to the points classification winner	Points	Alexander Kristoff (NOR)	(Norway)
Jersey awarded to the mountains classification winner	Mountains	Fredrik Dversnes (NOR)	(Team Coop)
Jersey awarded to the youth classification winner	Youth	Victor Lafay (FRA)	(Cofidis)
	Team	Astana–Premier Tech	

The 2021 Arctic Race of Norway was a road cycling stage race that took place between 5 and 8 August 2021. Though the race took place mostly in Troms county, Norway. The race also made a brief appearance in Finland, marking the first time that the race ventured outside of Norway. It was the eighth edition of the Arctic Race of Norway, which was rated as a 2.Pro event on the 2021 UCI Europe Tour and the 2021 UCI ProSeries calendars. This edition was the race's first in the UCI ProSeries; the 2020 edition was expected to feature in the inaugural UCI ProSeries but was cancelled due to the COVID-19 pandemic.

== Teams ==
Seven UCI WorldTeams, ten UCI ProTeams, one UCI Continental team, and the Norwegian national team made up the nineteen teams that participated in the race. With five riders each, Bora–Hansgrohe, Euskaltel–Euskadi, and Team Qhubeka NextHash were the only teams to not enter a full squad of six riders; 111 riders started the race.

UCI WorldTeams

- AG2R Citroën Team
- Astana–Premier Tech
- Bora–Hansgrohe
- Cofidis
- Intermarché–Wanty–Gobert Matériaux
- Israel Start-Up Nation
- Team Qhubeka NextHash

UCI ProTeams

- Alpecin–Fenix
- Arkéa–Samsic
- B&B Hotels p/b KTM
- Bingoal Pauwels Sauces WB
- Burgos BH
- Delko
- Euskaltel–Euskadi
- Sport Vlaanderen–Baloise
- Team TotalEnergies
- Uno-X Pro Cycling Team

UCI Continental Teams

- Team Coop

National Teams

- Norway

== Route ==
The 2021 edition of the race used the same route as the one planned for the cancelled 2020 edition; this route was first revealed on 12 November 2019. On the second stage, the race made its first venture outside of Norway for a stage finish in Kilpisjärvi, Finland.

Stage characteristics and winners
Stage	Date	Course	Distance	Type	Stage winner
1	5 August	Tromsø Municipality (around Kvaløya island)	142.5 km (88.5 mi)	Hilly stage	Markus Hoelgaard (NOR)
2	6 August	Nordkjosbotn (Balsfjord Municipality) to Skibotn (Storfjord Municipality) to Kilpisjärvi (Finland)	178 km (111 mi)	Hilly stage	Martin Laas (EST)
3	7 August	Finnsnes (Senja Municipality) to Øverbygd (Målselv Municipality (Alpine village)	184.5 km (114.6 mi)	Mountain stage	Ben Hermans (BEL)
4	8 August	Årstein (Gratangen Municipality) to Harstad (Harstad Municipality)	163.5 km (101.6 mi)	Hilly stage	Philipp Walsleben (GER)
Total			668.5 km (415.4 mi)		

== Stages ==
=== Stage 1 ===
5 August 2021 – Tromsø around Kvaløya island and back to Tromsø, 142.5 km (88.5 mi)

Stage 1 Result
Rank	Rider	Team	Time
1	Markus Hoelgaard (NOR)	Uno-X Pro Cycling Team	3h 11' 29"
2	Alexander Kristoff (NOR)	Norway	+ 2"
3	Bryan Coquard (FRA)	B&B Hotels p/b KTM	+ 2"
4	Antonio Jesús Soto (ESP)	Euskaltel–Euskadi	+ 2"
5	Kristian Aasvold (NOR)	Team Coop	+ 2"
6	Antonio Angulo (ESP)	Euskaltel–Euskadi	+ 2"
7	Warren Barguil (FRA)	Arkéa–Samsic	+ 2"
8	Clément Venturini (FRA)	AG2R Citroën Team	+ 2"
9	Aimé De Gendt (BEL)	Intermarché–Wanty–Gobert Matériaux	+ 2"
10	Odd Christian Eiking (NOR)	Intermarché–Wanty–Gobert Matériaux	+ 2"

General classification after Stage 1
Rank	Rider	Team	Time
1	Markus Hoelgaard (NOR)	Uno-X Pro Cycling Team	3h 11' 19"
2	Alexander Kristoff (NOR)	Norway	+ 6"
3	Bryan Coquard (FRA)	B&B Hotels p/b KTM	+ 8"
4	Kristian Aasvold (NOR)	Team Coop	+ 9"
5	Samuele Battistella (ITA)	Astana–Premier Tech	+ 10"
6	Antonio Jesús Soto (ESP)	Euskaltel–Euskadi	+ 11"
7	Antonio Angulo (ESP)	Euskaltel–Euskadi	+ 12"
8	Warren Barguil (FRA)	Arkéa–Samsic	+ 12"
9	Clément Venturini (FRA)	AG2R Citroën Team	+ 12"
10	Aimé De Gendt (BEL)	Intermarché–Wanty–Gobert Matériaux	+ 12"

=== Stage 2 ===
6 August 2021 – Nordkjosbotn to Skibotn to Kilpisjärvi (Finland), 178 km (111 mi)

Stage 2 Result
Rank	Rider	Team	Time
1	Martin Laas (EST)	Bora–Hansgrohe	3h 56' 14"
2	Alexander Kristoff (NOR)	Norway	+ 0"
3	Danny van Poppel (NED)	Intermarché–Wanty–Gobert Matériaux	+ 0"
4	Rudy Barbier (FRA)	Israel Start-Up Nation	+ 0"
5	Manuel Peñalver (ESP)	Burgos BH	+ 0"
6	Arne Marit (BEL)	Sport Vlaanderen–Baloise	+ 0"
7	Tom Devriendt (BEL)	Intermarché–Wanty–Gobert Matériaux	+ 0"
8	Bram Welten (NED)	Arkéa–Samsic	+ 0"
9	Edvald Boasson Hagen (NOR)	Team TotalEnergies	+ 0"
10	Bryan Coquard (FRA)	B&B Hotels p/b KTM	+ 0"

General classification after Stage 2
Rank	Rider	Team	Time
1	Alexander Kristoff (NOR)	Norway	7h 07' 33"
2	Markus Hoelgaard (NOR)	Uno-X Pro Cycling Team	+ 0"
3	Bryan Coquard (FRA)	B&B Hotels p/b KTM	+ 8"
4	Kristian Aasvold (NOR)	Team Coop	+ 9"
5	Samuele Battistella (ITA)	Astana–Premier Tech	+ 10"
6	Antonio Jesús Soto (ESP)	Euskaltel–Euskadi	+ 11"
7	Laurent Pichon (FRA)	Arkéa–Samsic	+ 11"
8	Dries Van Gestel (BEL)	Team TotalEnergies	+ 12"
9	Antonio Angulo (ESP)	Euskaltel–Euskadi	+ 12"
10	Axel Zingle (FRA)	Cofidis	+ 12"

=== Stage 3 ===
7 August 2021 – Finnsnes (Senja) to Øverbygd (Alpine village in Målselv), 184.5 km (114.6 mi)

Stage 3 Result
Rank	Rider	Team	Time
1	Ben Hermans (BEL)	Israel Start-Up Nation	4h 14' 28"
2	Odd Christian Eiking (NOR)	Intermarché–Wanty–Gobert Matériaux	+ 0"
3	Victor Lafay (FRA)	Cofidis	+ 0"
4	Samuele Battistella (ITA)	Astana–Premier Tech	+ 12"
5	Eduard Prades (ESP)	Delko	+ 19"
6	Kristian Aasvold (NOR)	Team Coop	+ 19"
7	Andreas Leknessund (NOR)	Norway	+ 19"
8	Antonio Jesús Soto (ESP)	Euskaltel–Euskadi	+ 19"
9	Pelayo Sánchez (ESP)	Burgos BH	+ 19"
10	Torstein Træen (NOR)	Uno-X Pro Cycling Team	+ 22"

General classification after Stage 3
Rank	Rider	Team	Time
1	Ben Hermans (BEL)	Israel Start-Up Nation	11h 22' 03"
2	Odd Christian Eiking (NOR)	Intermarché–Wanty–Gobert Matériaux	+ 4"
3	Victor Lafay (FRA)	Cofidis	+ 6"
4	Samuele Battistella (ITA)	Astana–Premier Tech	+ 20"
5	Kristian Aasvold (NOR)	Team Coop	+ 26"
6	Antonio Jesús Soto (ESP)	Euskaltel–Euskadi	+ 28"
7	Eduard Prades (ESP)	Delko	+ 29"
8	Andreas Leknessund (NOR)	Norway	+ 29"
9	Warren Barguil (FRA)	Arkéa–Samsic	+ 32"
10	Jacob Eriksson (SWE)	Team Coop	+ 36"

=== Stage 4 ===
8 August 2021 – Årstein (Gratangen) to Harstad, 163.5 km (101.6 mi)

Stage 4 Result
Rank	Rider	Team	Time
1	Philipp Walsleben (GER)	Alpecin–Fenix	3h 41' 40"
2	Niki Terpstra (NED)	Team TotalEnergies	+ 0"
3	Alexandre Delettre (FRA)	Delko	+ 17"
4	Odd Christian Eiking (NOR)	Intermarché–Wanty–Gobert Matériaux	+ 17"
5	Erik Resell (NOR)	Uno-X Pro Cycling Team	+ 19"
6	Warren Barguil (FRA)	Arkéa–Samsic	+ 19"
7	Axel Zingle (FRA)	Cofidis	+ 19"
8	Bryan Coquard (FRA)	B&B Hotels p/b KTM	+ 19"
9	Victor Lafay (FRA)	Cofidis	+ 19"
10	Petr Vakoč (CZE)	Alpecin–Fenix	+ 19"

General classification after Stage 4
Rank	Rider	Team	Time
1	Ben Hermans (BEL)	Israel Start-Up Nation	15h 04' 02"
2	Odd Christian Eiking (NOR)	Intermarché–Wanty–Gobert Matériaux	+ 2"
3	Victor Lafay (FRA)	Cofidis	+ 6"
4	Samuele Battistella (ITA)	Astana–Premier Tech	+ 20"
5	Kristian Aasvold (NOR)	Team Coop	+ 26"
6	Eduard Prades (ESP)	Delko	+ 29"
7	Andreas Leknessund (NOR)	Norway	+ 29"
8	Warren Barguil (FRA)	Arkéa–Samsic	+ 32"
9	Jacob Eriksson (SWE)	Team Coop	+ 36"
10	Torstein Træen (NOR)	Uno-X Pro Cycling Team	+ 50"

== Classification leadership table ==
Classification leadership by stage
Stage	Winner	General classification (Note: The general classification leader's jersey was known as the midnight sun jersey.)	Points classification	Mountains classification	Young rider classification	Team classification	Combativity award
1	Markus Hoelgaard	Markus Hoelgaard	Markus Hoelgaard	Gleb Brussenskiy	Samuele Battistella	Norway	Alexis Gougeard
2	Martin Laas	Alexander Kristoff	Alexander Kristoff	Fredrik Dversnes	Samuele Battistella	Norway	Jimmy Janssens
3	Ben Hermans	Ben Hermans	Alexander Kristoff	Fredrik Dversnes	Victor Lafay	Astana–Premier Tech	Fredrik Dversnes
4	Philipp Walsleben	Ben Hermans	Alexander Kristoff	Fredrik Dversnes	Victor Lafay	Astana–Premier Tech	Niki Terpstra
Final		Ben Hermans	Alexander Kristoff	Fredrik Dversnes	Victor Lafay	Astana–Premier Tech	Not awarded

- On stage 2, Alexander Kristoff, who was second in the points classification, wore the green jersey, because first placed Markus Hoelgaard wore the midnight sun jersey as the leader of the general classification.
- On stage 3, Markus Hoelgaard, who was second in the points classification, wore the green jersey, because first placed Alexander Kristoff wore the midnight sun jersey as the leader of the general classification.

== Final classification standings ==
Legend
Denotes the winner of the general classification	Denotes the winner of the young rider classification
Denotes the winner of the points classification	Denotes the winner of the combativity award
Denotes the winner of the mountains classification	

=== General classification ===
Final general classification (1–10)
Rank	Rider	Team	Time
1	Ben Hermans (BEL)	Israel Start-Up Nation	15h 04' 02"
2	Odd Christian Eiking (NOR)	Intermarché–Wanty–Gobert Matériaux	+ 2"
3	Victor Lafay (FRA)	Cofidis	+ 6"
4	Samuele Battistella (ITA)	Astana–Premier Tech	+ 20"
5	Kristian Aasvold (NOR)	Team Coop	+ 26"
6	Eduard Prades (ESP)	Delko	+ 29"
7	Andreas Leknessund (NOR)	Norway	+ 29"
8	Warren Barguil (FRA)	Arkéa–Samsic	+ 32"
9	Jacob Eriksson (SWE)	Team Coop	+ 36"
10	Torstein Træen (NOR)	Uno-X Pro Cycling Team	+ 50"

=== Points classification ===
Final points classification (1–10)
Rank	Rider	Team	Points
1	Alexander Kristoff (NOR)	Norway	24
2	Martin Laas (EST)	Bora–Hansgrohe	22
3	Odd Christian Eiking (NOR)	Intermarché–Wanty–Gobert Matériaux	20
4	Philipp Walsleben (GER)	Alpecin–Fenix	17
5	Niki Terpstra (NED)	Team TotalEnergies	17
6	Alexandre Delettre (FRA)	Delko	16
7	Ben Hermans (BEL)	Israel Start-Up Nation	15
8	Markus Hoelgaard (NOR)	Uno-X Pro Cycling Team	15
9	Kristian Aasvold (NOR)	Team Coop	14
10	Bryan Coquard (FRA)	B&B Hotels p/b KTM	13

=== Mountains classification ===
Final mountains classification (1–10)
Rank	Rider	Team	Points
1	Fredrik Dversnes (NOR)	Team Coop	21
2	Niki Terpstra (NED)	Team TotalEnergies	9
3	Gleb Brussenskiy (KAZ)	Astana–Premier Tech	8
4	Tore Andre Vabø (NOR)	Team Coop	8
5	Thomas Champion (FRA)	Cofidis	7
6	Cériel Desal (BEL)	Bingoal Pauwels Sauces WB	7
7	Odd Christian Eiking (NOR)	Intermarché–Wanty–Gobert Matériaux	6
8	Alexis Gougeard (FRA)	AG2R Citroën Team	6
9	Julien Duval (FRA)	AG2R Citroën Team	6
10	Ben Hermans (BEL)	Israel Start-Up Nation	5

=== Young rider classification ===
Final young rider classification (1–10)
Rank	Rider	Team	Time
1	Victor Lafay (FRA)	Cofidis	15h 04' 08"
2	Samuele Battistella (ITA)	Astana–Premier Tech	+ 14"
3	Andreas Leknessund (NOR)	Norway	+ 23"
4	Jacob Eriksson (SWE)	Team Coop	+ 30"
5	Stefan de Bod (RSA)	Astana–Premier Tech	+ 55"
6	Mathieu Burgaudeau (FRA)	Team TotalEnergies	+ 57"
7	Pelayo Sánchez (ESP)	Burgos BH	+ 58"
8	Luc Wirtgen (LUX)	Bingoal Pauwels Sauces WB	+ 59"
9	Torjus Sleen (NOR)	Uno-X Pro Cycling Team	+ 1' 17"
10	Axel Zingle (FRA)	Cofidis	+ 1' 21"

=== Team classification ===
Final team classification (1–10)
Rank	Team	Time
1	Astana–Premier Tech	45h 14' 35"
2	Uno-X Pro Cycling Team	+ 38"
3	Norway	+ 1' 09"
4	Bingoal Pauwels Sauces WB	+ 1' 34"
5	Delko	+ 1' 47"
6	Team Coop	+ 3' 06"
7	AG2R Citroën Team	+ 3' 44"
8	Alpecin–Fenix	+ 4' 19"
9	Team TotalEnergies	+ 5' 01"
10	Sport Vlaanderen–Baloise	+ 5' 34"
