= Jordi Warlop =

Belgian cyclist

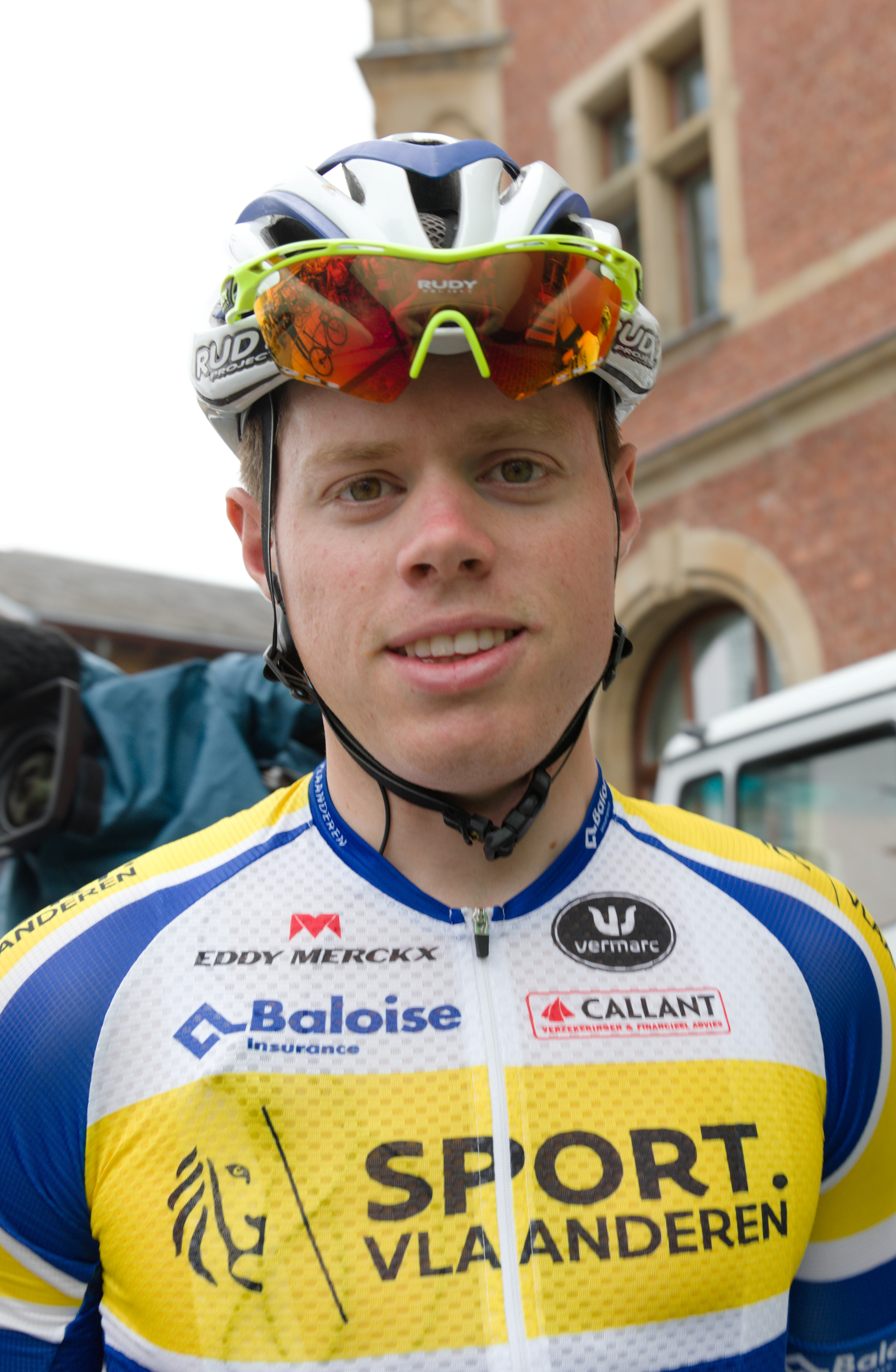
- Warlop in 2018.

Personal information
- Full name: Jordi Warlop
- Born: 4 June 1996 (age 30) Diksmuide, Belgium
- Height: 1.83 m (6 ft 0 in)
- Weight: 73 kg (161 lb)

Cycling career
- Sport: Cycling
- Current team: Soudal–Quick-Step
- Discipline: Road
- Role: Rider

Amateur team
- 2015–2017: EFC–Etixx

Professional teams
- 2018–2022: Sport Vlaanderen–Baloise
- 2022: B&B Hotels–KTM
- 2023: Soudal–Quick-Step Devo Team
- 2024–2025: Soudal–Quick-Step

Jordi Warlop (born 4 June 1996 in Diksmuide) is a former Belgian cyclist, who last rode for UCI WorldTeam Soudal–Quick-Step.

== Major results ==
2014
2nd Road race, UEC European Junior Road Championships
3rd Overall Keizer der Juniores
2015
9th Piccolo Giro di Lombardia
2016
9th Eschborn–Frankfurt Under–23
10th Grand Prix Criquielion
2017
3rd Paris–Roubaix Espoirs
5th Piccolo Giro di Lombardia
7th Grote Prijs Stad Sint-Niklaas
10th Omloop Het Nieuwsblad U23
2018
7th Trofeo Palma
2019
8th Gooikse Pijl
10th Ronde van Limburg
2021
7th Grote Prijs Jean-Pierre Monseré
8th Grote Prijs Marcel Kint
9th Elfstedenronde
2022
10th Veenendaal–Veenendaal Classic
2023
2nd Muscat Classic
4th Grand Prix Criquielion
6th Grote Prijs Jean-Pierre Monseré
8th Dorpenomloop Rucphen
2025
8th Ronde van Limburg
