= Andreas Leknessund =

Norwegian cyclist (born 1999)

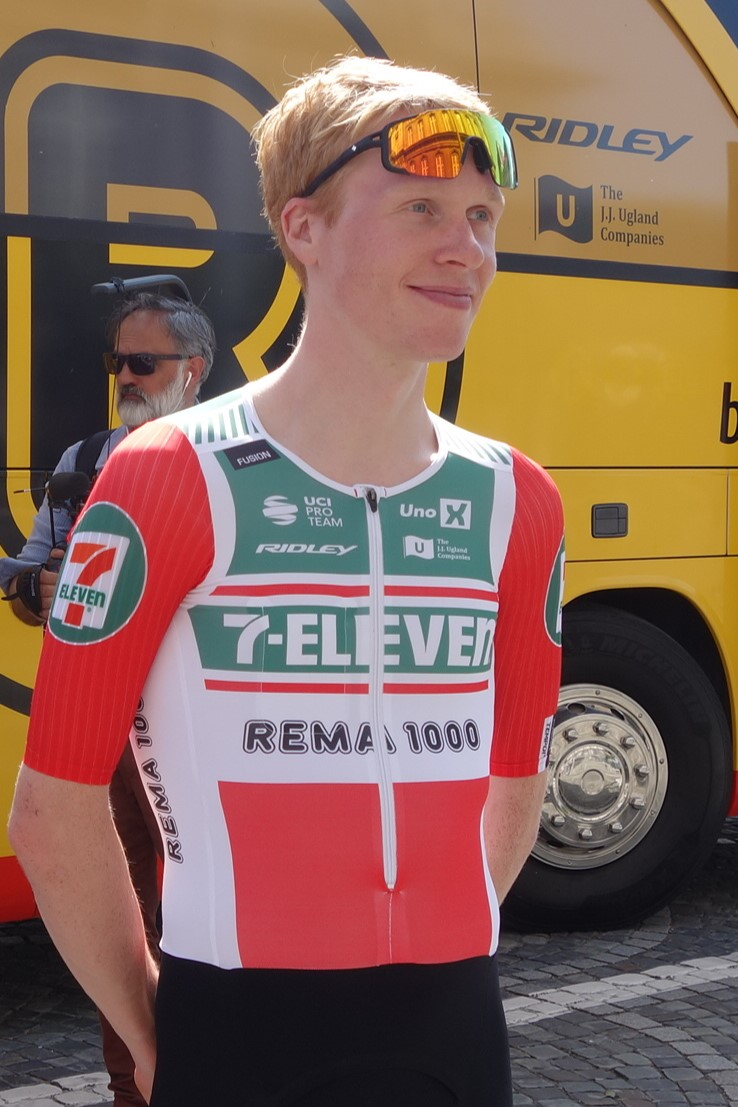
- Leknessund in 2025

Personal information
- Full name: Andreas Rikardsen Leknessund
- Born: 21 May 1999 (age 27) Tromsø, Norway
- Height: 1.86 m (6 ft 1 in)
- Weight: 72 kg (159 lb)

Cycling career
- Sport: Cycling
- Current team: Uno-X Mobility
- Discipline: Road
- Role: Rider
- Rider type: All-rounder

Amateur team
- 2018: Ringerike SK

Professional teams
- 2018–2020: Uno-X Norwegian Development Team
- 2021–2023: Team DSM
- 2024–: Uno-X Mobility

Major wins
- Grand Tours Vuelta a España 1 individual stage (2026) Stage races Arctic Race of Norway (2022) One-day races and Classics National Road Race Championships (2025) National Time Trial Championships (2019, 2020)
Medal record
Representing Norway
Men's road bicycle racing
European Championships
Gold medal – first place	2020 Plouay	Under-23 time trial
Gold medal – first place	2017 Herning	Junior time trial

Andreas Rikardsen Leknessund (born 21 May 1999 in Tromsø) is a Norwegian cyclist, who currently rides for UCI ProTeam Uno-X Mobility.

== Career ==
After a successful junior career, Leknessund turned professional in May 2018 with UCI Continental team Uno-X Norwegian Development Team. His first major victory was the Norwegian elite national time trial championships in 2019. He stayed with the team until being signed by UCI WorldTeam Team DSM in 2021 after showing promising results, having won the elite national time trial championships a second time, the Giro del Friuli Venezia Giulia and the UEC European Under-23 Time Trial Championships among other races in 2020. In June 2022 he won stage two of the Tour de Suisse in a solo victory from the breakaway. In August, he won the Arctic Race of Norway, taking the race lead after winning the fourth and final stage. At the 2023 Giro d'Italia, Leknessund moved into the lead after finishing second on stage four. He was able to hold onto the lead until the time trial on stage nine. He ultimately went on to finish 8th overall. This also made him the first rider from north of the Arctic Circle to have led the race.

After spending three seasons with Team dsm–firmenich, Leknessund returned to Uno-X Mobility for the 2024 season on a three-year contract. He won his first Grand Tour stage at the 2026 Vuelta a España, finishing 34 seconds ahead of his team-mate Tobias Halland Johannessen. The win came the day after the death of King Harald V of Norway, with both riders wearing black armbands in his memory.

== Major results ==
2016
2nd Time trial, National Junior Road Championships
5th Time trial, UEC European Junior Road Championships
2017
1st Time trial, UEC European Junior Road Championships
1st Time trial, National Junior Road Championships
1st Overall Tour du Pays de Vaud

1st Stage 1

1st Stage 2a Internationale Niedersachsen-Rundfahrt
2nd Overall Peace Race Juniors

1st Stage 2a

2nd Overall Trophée Centre Morbihan

1st Stage 2

2nd Road race, National Junior Road Championships
8th Time trial, UCI Junior Road World Championships
2018
2nd Time trial, National Road Championships
7th Overall Ronde de l'Isard
8th Overall Grand Prix Priessnitz spa
2019 (1 pro win)
National Road Championships

1st Time trial
2nd Road race

1st Overall Grand Prix Priessnitz spa

1st Young rider classification
1st Stage 3

2nd Overall Circuit des Ardennes

1st Young rider classification

2nd Overall Ronde de l'Isard
2nd Kattekoers
5th Time trial, UEC European Under-23 Road Championships
2020 (1)
1st Time trial, National Road Championships
1st Time trial, UEC European Under-23 Road Championships
1st Overall Giro del Friuli Venezia Giulia

1st Points classification
1st Mountains classification
1st Stages 1 (TTT) & 3

1st Hafjell GP
1st Lillehammer GP
3rd Road race, National Under-23 Road Championships
4th Overall Okolo Slovenska

1st Young rider classification

8th Piccolo Giro di Lombardia
2021
National Road Championships

3rd Time trial
4th Road race

7th Overall Arctic Race of Norway
10th Brabantse Pijl
2022 (3)
1st Overall Arctic Race of Norway

1st Young rider classification
1st Stage 4

1st Stage 2 Tour de Suisse
2023
3rd Time trial, National Road Championships
8th Overall Giro d'Italia

Held & after Stages 4–8

2024 (1)
2nd Overall Sibiu Cycling Tour

1st Stage 1

National Road Championships

3rd Time trial
4th Road race

10th Overall Danmark Rundt
10th Overall Czech Tour
2025 (1)
National Road Championships

1st Road race
2nd Time trial

1st Sundvolden GP
1st Sprints classification, Vuelta a Andalucía
2nd Ringerike GP
4th Overall Région Pays de la Loire Tour

1st Mountains classification

6th Time trial, UCI Road World Championships
2026 (1)
Vuelta a España

1st Stage 7
Held after Stage 8
Combativity award Stage 15

2nd Overall Vuelta a Andalucía

=== Grand Tour general classification results timeline ===
Grand Tour	2022	2023	2024	2025
Giro d'Italia	—	8	—	—
Tour de France	28	—	—	57
Vuelta a España	—	—	—	—

Legend
—	Did not compete
DNF	Did not finish
