= Kristian Aasvold =

Norwegian cyclist

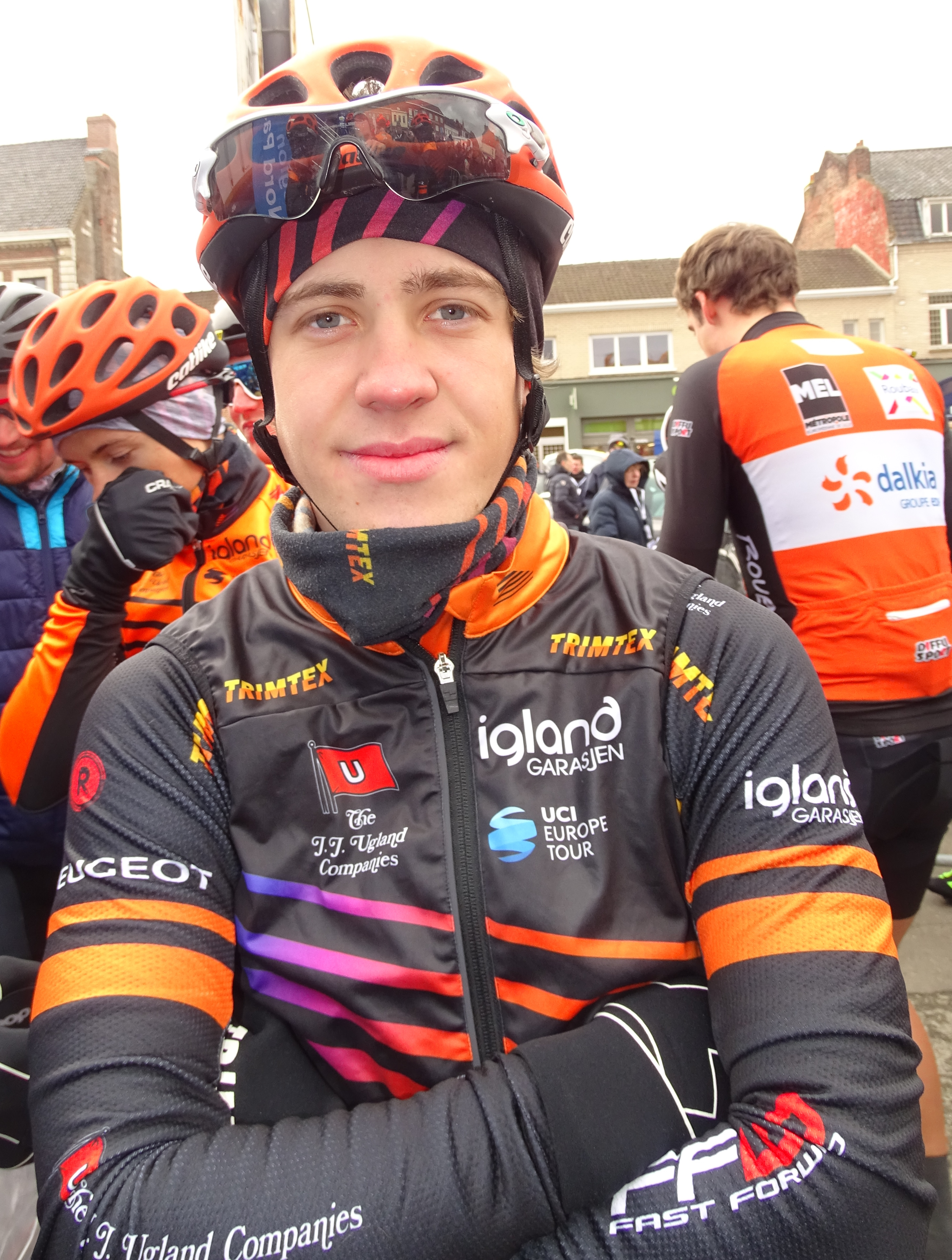
- Aasvold in 2016

Personal information
- Full name: Kristian Aasvold
- Born: 30 May 1995 (age 31) Snåsa Municipality, Norway
- Height: 1.73 m (5 ft 8 in)
- Weight: 61 kg (134 lb)

Cycling career
- Sport: Cycling
- Current team: Retired
- Discipline: Road
- Role: Rider

Professional teams
- 2014–2017: Team Sparebanken Sør
- 2018–2019: Team Coop
- 2020: Riwal Readynez
- 2021: Team Coop
- 2022–2023: Human Powered Health

Kristian Aasvold (born 30 May 1995) is a Norwegian former racing cyclist, who competed as a professional from 2014 to 2023. He competed in the men's team time trial event at the 2017 UCI Road World Championships.

== Major results ==
2018
3rd Road race, National Road Championships
5th Sundvolden GP
5th Himmerland Rundt
5th Fyen Rundt
10th Ringerike GP
2019
2nd Lillehammer GP
2021
3rd Road race, National Road Championships
5th Overall Arctic Race of Norway
6th Overall Tour of Norway
10th Gooikse Pijl
