= Federal Security Service =

Principal security agency of Russia

Federal Security Service of the Russian Federation
- Федеральная служба безопасности Российской Федерации; Federal'naya sluzhba bezopasnosti Rossiyskoy Federatsii
- Emblem of the Federal Security Service of the Russian Federation

- Flag of the Federal Security Service of the Russian Federation

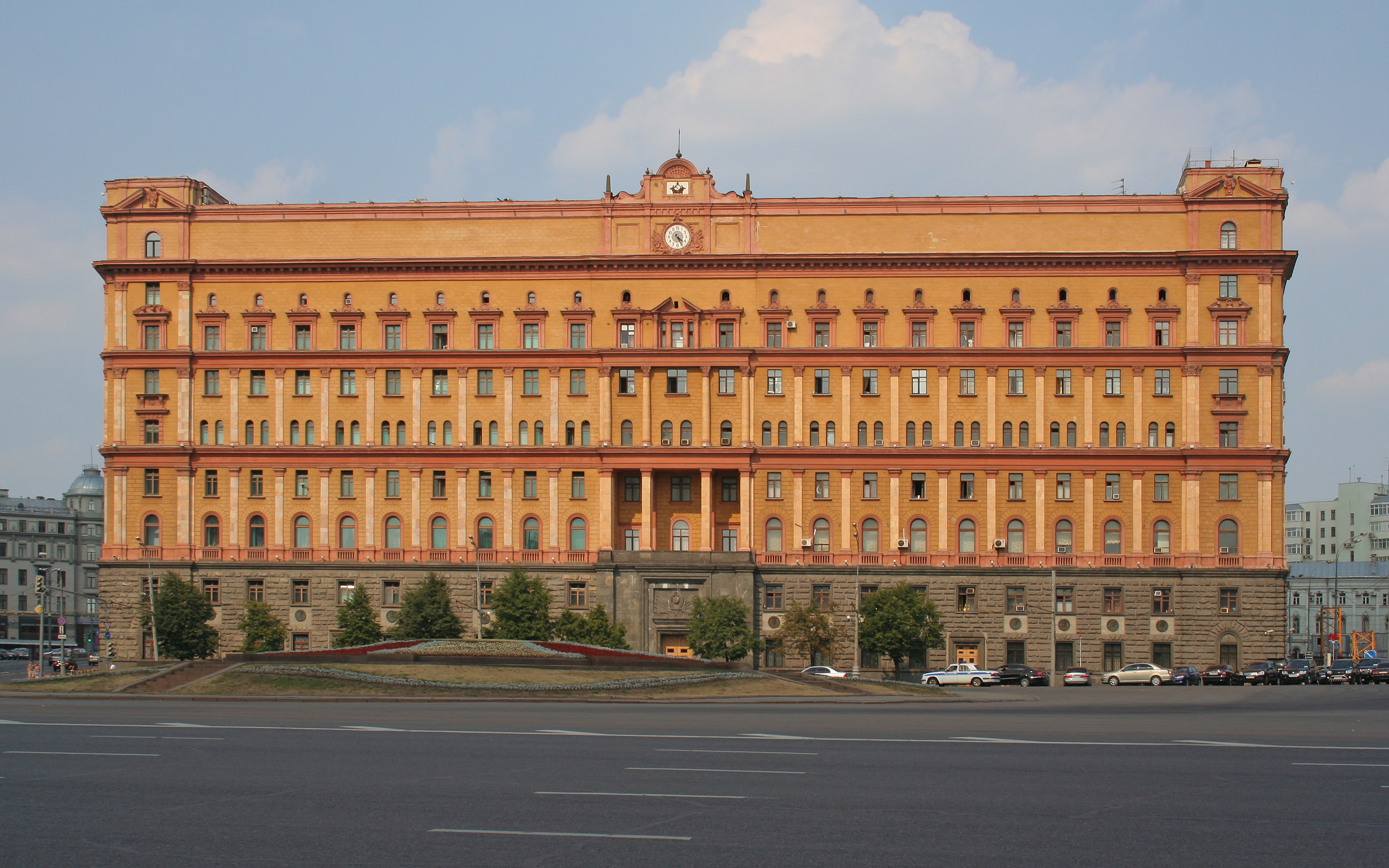
- Lubyanka Building, headquarters of the FSB

Agency overview
- Formed: 3 April 1995; 31 years ago
- Preceding agency: FSK
- Type: Independent
- Jurisdiction: Russia
- Headquarters: Lubyanka Building; 55°45′39″N 37°37′42″E
- Agency executives: Alexander Bortnikov (Army General), Director; Sergei Korolev, First Deputy Director
- Website: www.fsb.ru

The Federal Security Service of the Russian Federation (FSB) (Note: Russian: Федеральная служба безопасности Российской Федерации, romanized: Federal'naya sluzhba bezopasnosti Rossiyskoy Federatsii, IPA: [fʲɪdʲɪˈralʲnəjə ˈsluʐbə bʲɪzɐˈpasnəstʲɪ rɐˈsʲijskəj fʲɪdʲɪˈratsɨɪ], commonly abbreviated as ФСБ (FSB) or ФСБ России (FSB Rossii).) is the principal security agency of Russia and the main successor agency to the Soviet Union's KGB; its immediate predecessor was the Federal Counterintelligence Service (FSK), which was reorganized into the FSB in 1995. The three major structural successor components of the former KGB that remain administratively independent of the FSB are the Foreign Intelligence Service (SVR), the Federal Protective Service (FSO), and the Main Directorate of Special Programs of the President of the Russian Federation (GUSP).

The primary responsibilities are within the country and include counter-intelligence, internal and border security, counterterrorism, surveillance and investigating some other types of serious crimes and federal law violations. It is headquartered in Lubyanka Square, Moscow's center, in the main building of the former KGB. The director of the FSB is appointed by and directly answerable to the president of Russia. Being part of Russia's executive branch formally, the FSB has significant, if not decisive, power over it.

In 2003, the FSB's responsibilities were expanded by incorporating the Border Guard Service and a major part of the Federal Agency of Government Communication and Information (FAPSI); this would include intelligence activities in countries that were once members of the Soviet Union, work formerly done by the KGB's Fifth Service. The SVR had in 1992 signed an agreement not to spy on those countries; the FSB had made no such commitment.

== History ==
=== Reorganization of the KGB ===
The Federal Security Service is one of the successor organizations of the Soviet Committee for State Security (KGB). Following the attempted coup of 1991—in which some KGB units as well as the KGB head Vladimir Kryuchkov played a major part—the KGB was dismantled and ceased to exist from November 1991.

In December 1991, two government agencies answerable to the Russian president were created by President Yeltsin's decrees on the basis of the relevant main directorates of the defunct KGB: Foreign Intelligence Service (Russia) (SVR, the former First Main Directorate) and the Federal Agency of Government Communications and Information (FAPSI, merging the functions of the former 8th Main Directorate and 16th Main Directorate of the KGB). In January 1992, another new institution, the Ministry of Security, took over domestic and border security responsibilities. Following the 1993 constitutional crisis, the Ministry of Security was reorganized on 21 December 1993 into the Federal Counter-Intelligence Service (FSK). The FSK was headed by Sergei Stepashin. Before the start of the First Chechen War's main military activities, the FSK was responsible for the covert operations against the separatists led by Dzhokhar Dudayev.

=== Creation of the FSB ===
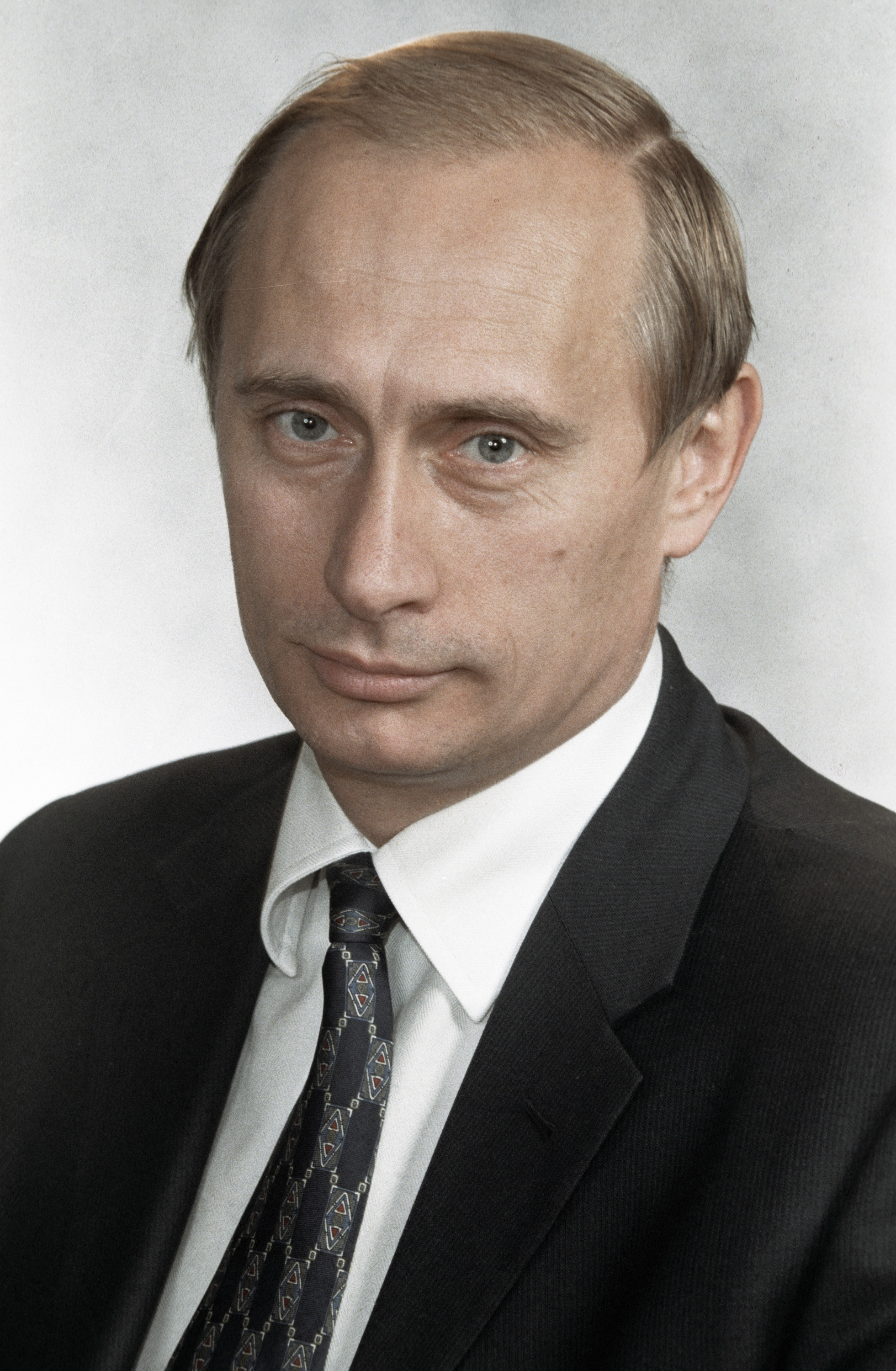
President of Russia and former KGB officer Vladimir Putin served as the FSB's director from 1998 to 1999.

In 1995, the FSK was renamed and reorganized into the Federal Security Service (FSB) by the Federal Law "On the Federal Security Service" (the title of the law as amended in June 2003) signed by the president on 3 April 1995. The FSB reforms were rounded out by decree No. 633, signed by Boris Yeltsin on 23 June 1995. The decree made the tasks of the FSB more specific, giving the FSB substantial rights to conduct cryptographic work, and described the powers of the FSB director. The number of deputy directors was increased to eight: two first deputies, five deputies responsible for departments and directorates and one deputy director heading the Moscow City and Moscow regional directorate. Yeltsin appointed Colonel-General Mikhail Ivanovich Barsukov as the new director of the FSB. In 1998, Yeltsin appointed Vladimir Putin, a KGB veteran who would later succeed Yeltsin as federal president, as director of the FSB. Putin was reluctant to take over the directorship, but once appointed conducted a thorough reorganization, which included the dismissal of most of the FSB's top personnel. Putin appointed Nikolai Patrushev as the head of FSB in 1999.

=== Role in the Second Chechen War ===
After the main military offensive of the Second Chechen War ended and the separatists changed tactics to guerilla warfare, overall command of the federal forces in Chechnya was transferred from the military to the FSB in January 2001. While the army lacked technical means of tracking the guerrilla groups, the FSB suffered from insufficient human intelligence due to its inability to build networks of agents and informants. In the autumn of 2002, the separatists launched a massive campaign of terrorism against the Russian civilians, including the Dubrovka theatre attack. The inability of the federal forces to conduct efficient counterterrorist operations led to the government to transfer the responsibility of "maintaining order" in Chechnya from the FSB to the Ministry of Internal Affairs (MVD) in July 2003.

=== Putin reforms ===
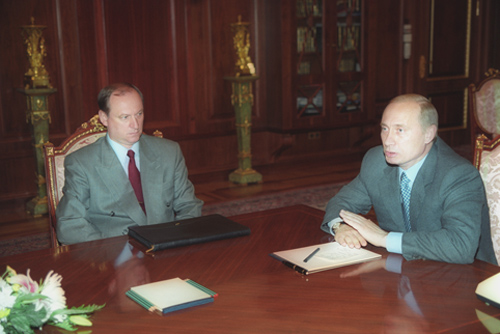
President Putin meeting with Director of FSB Nikolai Patrushev on 9 August 2000

After becoming president, Vladimir Putin launched a major reorganization of the FSB. First, the FSB was placed under direct control of the president by a decree issued on 17 May 2000. The internal structure of the agency was reformed by a decree signed on 17 June 2000. In the resulting structure, the FSB was to have a director, a first deputy director and nine other deputy directors, including one possible state secretary and the chiefs of six departments: Economic Security Department, Counterintelligence Department, Organizational and Personnel Service, Department of activity provision, Department for Analysis, Forecasting and Strategic Planning, Department for Protection of the Constitutional System and the Fight against Terrorism.

In 2003, the agency's responsibilities were considerably widened. The Border Guard Service of Russia, with its staff of 210,000, was integrated to the FSB via a decree signed on 11 March 2003. The merger was completed by 1 July 2003. In addition, The Federal Agency of Government Communication and Information (FAPSI) was abolished, and the FSB was granted a major part of its functions, while other parts went to the Ministry of Defense. Among the reasons for this strengthening of the FSB were the enhanced need for security after increased terror attacks against Russian civilians starting with the Moscow theater hostage crisis; the need to end the permanent infighting between the FSB, FAPSI and the Border Guards due to their overlapping functions; and the need for more efficient response to migration, drug trafficking and illegal arms trading. In addition, the FSB was the sole power base of the new president, so the restructuring strengthened his position (see Political groups under Vladimir Putin's presidency).

On 28 June 2004, in a speech to high-ranking FSB officers, Putin emphasized three major tasks of the agency: neutralizing foreign espionage, safeguarding the economic and financial security of the country, and combating organized crime. In September 2006, the FSB was shaken up by a major reshuffle. Combined with some earlier reassignments—most notably those of FSB Deputy Directors Yury Zaostrovtsev and Vladimir Anisimov in 2004 and 2005—the changes were widely believed to be linked to the Three Whales Corruption Scandal that had slowly unfolded since 2000. Some analysts considered the changes to be an attempt to undermine FSB Director Nikolay Patrushev's influence, as his team from the Karelian KGB Directorate of the late 1980s to early 1990s suffered most, and he had been on vacations during the events.

By 2008, the agency had one Director, two First Deputy Directors and five Deputy Directors. It had the following nine divisions:

1. Counter-Espionage
2. Service for Defense of Constitutional Order and Fight against Terrorism
3. Border Service
4. Economic Security Service
5. Current Information and International Links
6. Organizational and Personnel Service
7. Monitoring Department
8. Scientific and Technical Service
9. Organizational Security Service

=== Counterterrorist operations ===
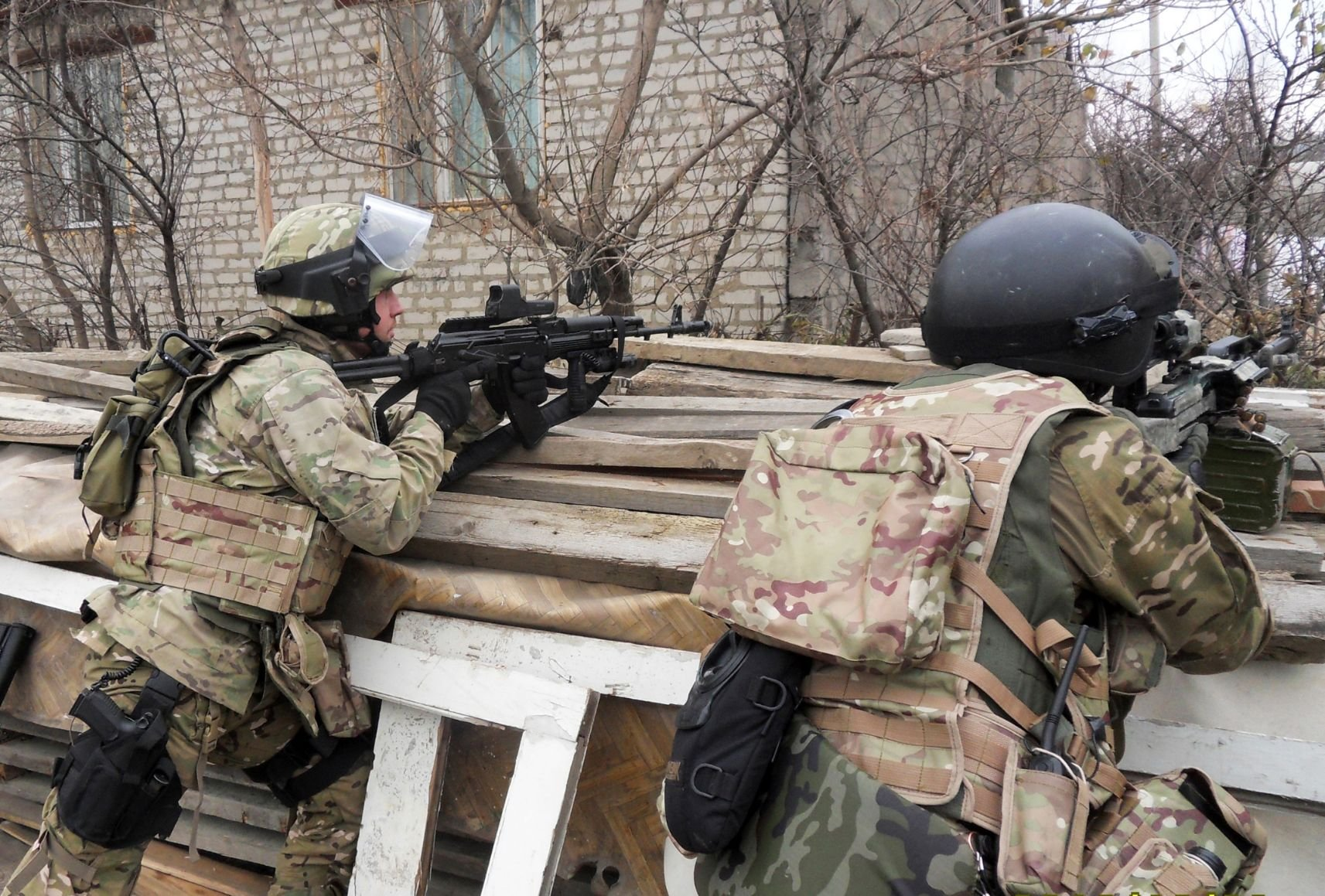
FSB special forces members during a special operation in Makhachkala, as a result of which "one fighter was killed and two terrorist attacks prevented" in 2010

Beginning with the Moscow theater hostage crisis in 2002, Russia was faced with increased levels of terrorism. FSB Spetsnaz units Alpha Group and Vympel played a key role in hostage rescue operations during the Moscow theater siege and the Beslan school siege. Their performance was criticised due to the high number of hostage casualties. In 2006, the FSB killed Shamil Basayev, who was behind the Beslan tragedy and several other high-profile terrorist acts. According to the FSB, the operation was planned over six months and made possible due to the FSB's increased activities in foreign countries that were supplying arms to the terrorists. Basayev was tracked via surveillance of this arms trafficking. He and other militants were preparing to carry out a terrorist attack in Ingushetia when FSB agents destroyed their convoy; 12 militants were killed.

During the last years of the Vladimir Putin's second presidency (2006–2008), terrorist attacks in Russia dwindled, falling from 257 in 2005 to 48 in 2007. Military analyst Vitaly Shlykov praised the effectiveness of Russia's security agencies, saying that the experience learned in Chechnya and Dagestan had been key to the success. In 2008, the American Carnegie Endowment's Foreign Policy magazine named Russia as "the worst place to be a terrorist" and highlighted especially Russia's willingness to prioritize national security over civil rights. By 2010, Russian forces led by the FSB had managed to eliminate the top level leadership of the Chechen insurgency, except for Dokka Umarov.

=== Increased terrorism and expansion of the FSB's powers ===
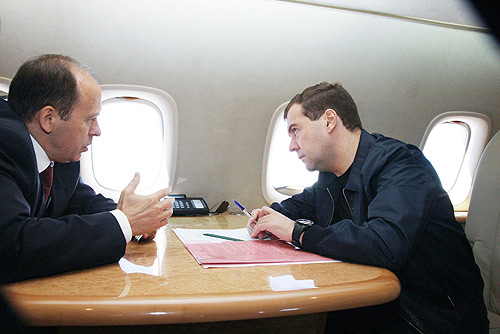
President Dmitry Medvedev talking to FSB Director Alexander Bortnikov in June 2009

Starting from 2009, the level of terrorism in Russia increased again, particularly suicide attacks. Between February 2005 and August 2008, no civilians were killed in such attacks. In 2008, at least 17 were killed, and in 2009 the number rose to 45.

In March 2010, Islamist militants organised the 2010 Moscow Metro bombings, which killed 40 people. One of the two blasts took place at Lubyanka station, near the FSB headquarters. Militant leader Doku Umarov—dubbed "Russia's Osama Bin Laden"—took responsibility for the attacks.

In July 2010, President Dmitry Medvedev expanded the FSB's powers in its fight against terrorism. FSB officers received the power to issue warnings to citizens on actions that could lead to committing crimes and arrest people for 15 days if they fail to comply with legitimate orders given by the officers. The bill was harshly criticized by human rights organizations.

=== Role in Ukraine ===
Since 2014, the FSB devoted substantial resources in preparing for a Russian takeover of Ukraine. Although Russia's SVR and GRU (foreign and military intelligence services) were also involved, FSB had a lead role on "intelligence and influence operations".

The FSB's Fifth Service, also referred to as the "Department for Operational Information" and "Operational Information and International Relations Service" is reported by the BBC and Radio Free Europe to be responsible for counterintelligence in former territories of the Soviet Union, work formerly done by the KGB's Fifth Service. Its Ninth Directorate of the Fifth Service targets Ukraine. Putin was persuaded to invade Ukraine by a small group of his closest associates, especially Nikolai Patrushev, Yury Kovalchuk and Alexander Bortnikov. According to some experts, Bortnikov played a key role in Putin's decision to invade Ukraine.

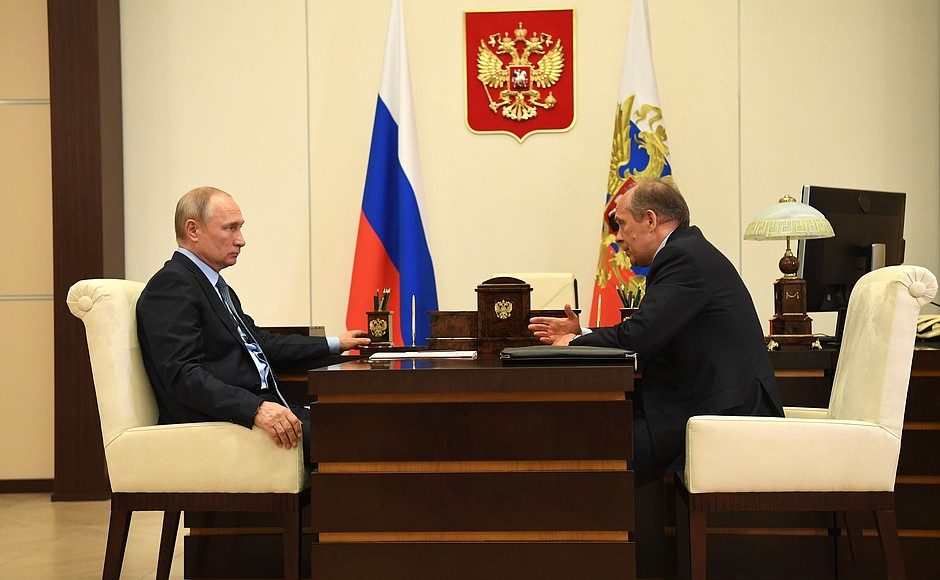
FSB Director Alexander Bortnikov played a key role in Putin's decision to invade Ukraine in 2022.

According to a report of the Royal United Services Institute citing interviews of officers and analysts of Security Service of Ukraine, the FSB Ukraine team greatly expanded in July 2021, and by February 2022 it had "around 200 officers" although most teams consist of only 10–20. Before the 2022 invasion, intelligence agencies in Ukraine, Germany, the UK, and the US reported that the FSB planned to replace elected leaders of Ukraine with Ukrainians living in Russia.

In 2014, according to a Russian military analyst, the FSB badly misled Putin with claims that Ukrainians would welcome a Russian invasion of Crimea to free them from "fascists". According to Radio Free Europe, in 2022, the FSB again promised easy victory if Russia invaded Ukraine.

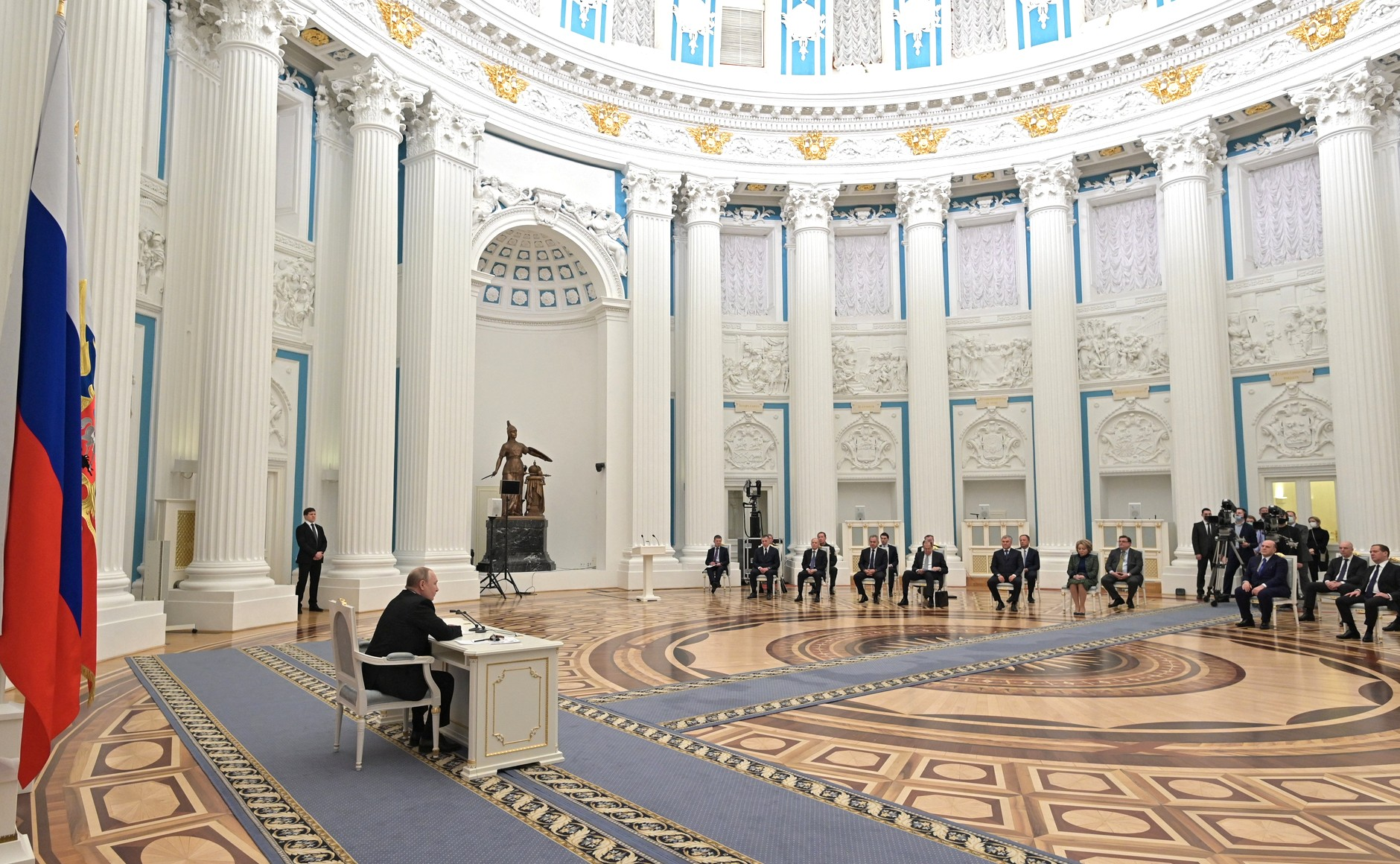
Putin, Bortnikov and members of the Security Council on 21 February 2022. That day, Putin said he would recognise the separatist-held territories in Donbas as independent states.

Since the start of the 2022 Russian invasion of Ukraine, Ukrainian counterintelligence has repeatedly asserted that the FSB suffered failures of operations security, including acts of insubordination and possible sabotage. In March 2022, Russia's encrypted communication system in Ukraine became useless after the Russian military destroyed cellphone towers; unencrypted phone calls from the FSB in Ukraine to superiors in Moscow discussing the death of Vitaly Gerasimov were tapped and released publicly. Ukrainian intelligence reported that FSB members were leaking intelligence to them, including the location of the Chechen commandos sent to assassinate Zelenskyy. In late March, Ukrainian intelligence posted online the names, addresses, phone numbers, and more of 620 people they identified as FSB agents. None of these reports have been confirmed by the FSB.

Media outlets of Ukraine, its allies in the West, and Russian dissidents report that Vladimir Putin has blamed setbacks in the military operations on the FSB and the Fifth Service. On 11 March 2022, investigative journalist Andrei Soldatov reported that Fifth Service head Sergey Beseda and his deputy, Anatoly Bolyukh were under house arrest due to Putin's discontent with intelligence failures regarding the invasion of Ukraine. A U.S. official interviewed by The Wall Street Journal described the arrest report as "credible".

On 11 April 2022, the Times of London, citing unnamed sources who had spoken to Bellingcat executive director Christo Grozev, reported that Beseda was transferred to Lefortovo Prison, the scene of mass executions during Stalin's purges. The same report claims that up over 100 FSB agents from the Fifth Service had been sacked. The Times of London also reports that "it is thought that" the Fifth Service is now headed by Beseda's former subordinate, Grigory Grishaev.

According to an article in the 11 April 2022 issue of The Washington Post:

Several current and former officials described the Russian security service as rife with corruption, beset by bureaucratic bloat and ultimately out of touch. A Ukrainian intelligence official said the FSB had spent millions recruiting a network of pro-Russian collaborators who ultimately told Putin and his top advisers, among them the current FSB director, what they wanted to hear.

A series of alleged leaked letters from FSB analysts, made public after the invasion began, report the same kind of problem. For example: "You have to write the analysis in a way that makes Russia the victor ... otherwise you get questioned for not doing good work."

Russian-American ballet dancer Ksenia Karelina was arrested in early 2024 in Yekaterinburg and charged with "treason" for sending $51.80 to Razom, a New York City-based nonprofit organization that sends humanitarian assistance to Ukraine. The FSB accused Karelina of taking part in "public actions to support the Kyiv regime." She initially faced life in prison, but pleaded guilty and was sentenced to 12 years in prison.

In August 2024, a "counter-terrorism" operational regime under the FSB was introduced in Kursk, Bryansk and Belgorod Oblasts. This means in practice that "movement is restricted, vehicles can be seized, phone calls can be monitored, areas are declared no-go zones, checkpoints introduced, and security is beefed up at key infrastructure sites."

== Function ==
=== Counterintelligence ===
In 2011, the FSB said it had exposed 199 foreign spies, including 41 professional spies and 158 agents employed by foreign intelligence services. The number has risen in recent years: in 2006 the FSB reportedly caught about 27 foreign intelligence officers and 89 foreign agents. Comparing the number of exposed spies historically, the then–FSB Director Nikolay Kovalyov said in 1996: "There has never been such a number of spies arrested by us since the time when German agents were sent in during the years of World War II." The 2011 figure is similar to what was reported in 1995–1996, when around 400 foreign intelligence agents were uncovered during the two-year period.

In a high-profile case of foreign espionage, the FSB said in February 2012 that an engineer working at the Plesetsk Cosmodrome, Russia's main space center for military launches, had been sentenced to 13 years in prison on charges of state treason. A court judged that the engineer had sold information about the testing of new Russian strategic missile systems to the American CIA.

A number of scientists have been accused of espionage and illegal technology exports by the FSB since it was established; instances include researcher Igor Sutyagin, physicist Valentin Danilov, physical chemist Oleg Korobeinichev, academician Oskar Kaibyshev, and physicist Yury Ryzhov. Ecologist and journalist Alexander Nikitin, who worked with the Bellona Foundation, was accused of espionage. He published material exposing hazards posed by the Russian Navy's nuclear fleet. He was acquitted in 1999 after spending several years in prison (his case was sent for re-investigation 13 times while he remained in prison). In August 2021, the FSB arrested plasma physics expert Alexander Kuranov, chief designer of the Hypersonic Systems Research Center (NIPGS in Russian) in St. Petersburg. Kuranov is suspected of passing secret information to a foreigner about hypersonic technology; he oversaw concept design on the Ayaks/Ajax hypersonic aircraft and has run a Russia-US scientific symposium for several years.

Other instances of prosecution are the cases of investigative journalist and ecologist Grigory Pasko, Vladimir Petrenko, who described danger posed by military chemical warfare stockpiles, and Nikolay Shchur, chairman of the Snezhinskiy Ecological Fund.

Other arrested people include Viktor Orekhov, a former KGB officer who assisted Soviet dissidents, Vladimir Kazantsev, who disclosed illegal purchases of eavesdropping devices from foreign firms, and Vil Mirzayanov, who had written that Russia was working on a nerve-gas weapon.

In June 2025, The New York Times reported that a leaked internal FSB memo raised concerns about China with respect to industrial espionage of sensitive Russian technologies. Information on Russia's weaponry has increasingly been targeted by advanced persistent threats emanating from China.

=== Counterterrorism ===
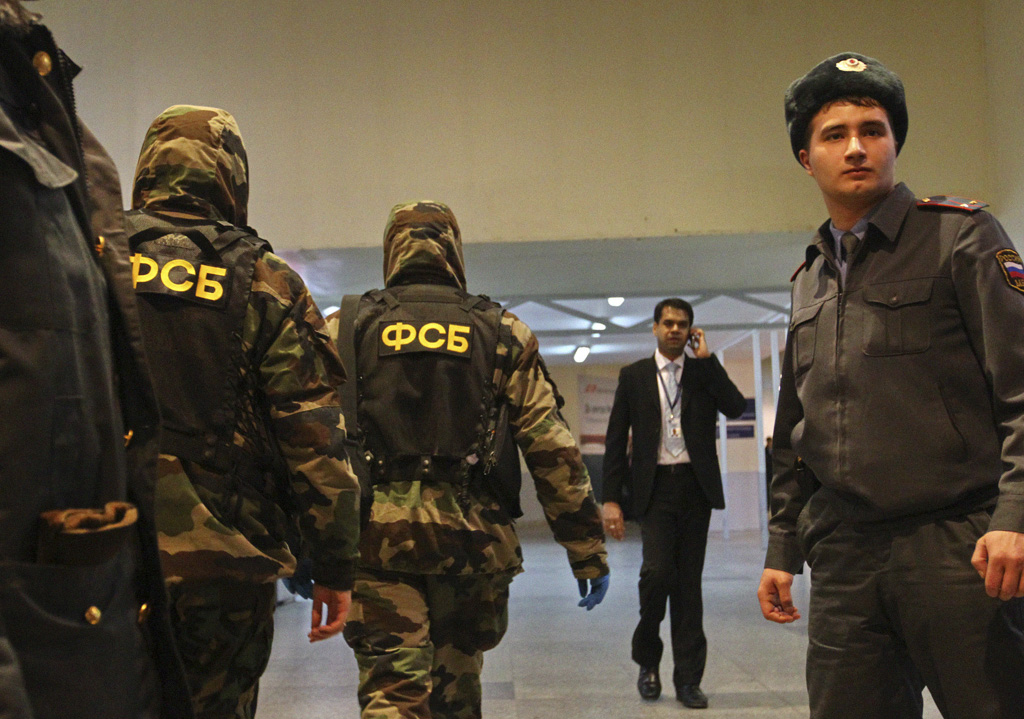
FSB officers on the scene of the Domodedovo International Airport bombing in 2011. Combating terrorism is one of the main tasks of the agency.

In 2011, the FSB prevented 94 "crimes of a terrorist nature", including eight terrorist attacks. In particular, the agency foiled a planned suicide bombing in Moscow on New Year's Eve. The agency failed to prevent terrorists from perpetrating the Domodedovo International Airport bombing. Over the years, FSB and affiliated state security organizations have killed all presidents of the separatist Chechen Republic of Ichkeria including Dzhokhar Dudaev, Zelimkhan Yandarbiev, Aslan Maskhadov, and Abdul-Khalim Saidullaev. During the Moscow theater hostage crisis and Beslan school hostage crisis, all hostage-takers were killed on the spot by FSB spetsnaz forces. Only one of the suspects, Nur-Pashi Kulayev, survived and was convicted later by the court. It is reported that more than 100 leaders of terrorist groups have been killed during 119 operations on North Caucasus during 2006. On 28 July 2006, the FSB presented a list of 17 terrorist organizations recognized by the Supreme Court of the Russian Federation, to Rossiyskaya Gazeta newspaper, which published the list that day. The list had been available previously, but only through individual request. Commenting on the list, Yuri Sapunov, head of counterterrorism at the FSB, named three main criteria necessary for organizations to be listed.

=== Foreign intelligence ===
According to some unofficial sources, since 1999, the FSB has also been tasked with the intelligence-gathering on the territory of the CIS countries, wherein the SVR is legally forbidden from conducting espionage under the inter-government agreements. Such activity is in line with Article 8 of the Federal Law on the FSB.

According to the Royal United Services Institute, FSB's Department for Operational Information "is responsible for compiling data on Russia's 'near abroad'", having taken over the work of KGB's Fifth Service, which ran counterintelligence inside territories of the Soviet Union.

On 30 June 2025, Azerbaijani police detained two alleged FSB agents in Baku.

=== Targeted killing ===
In the summer of 2006, the FSB was given the legal power to engage in targeted killing of terrorism suspects overseas if ordered by the president.

=== Border protection ===
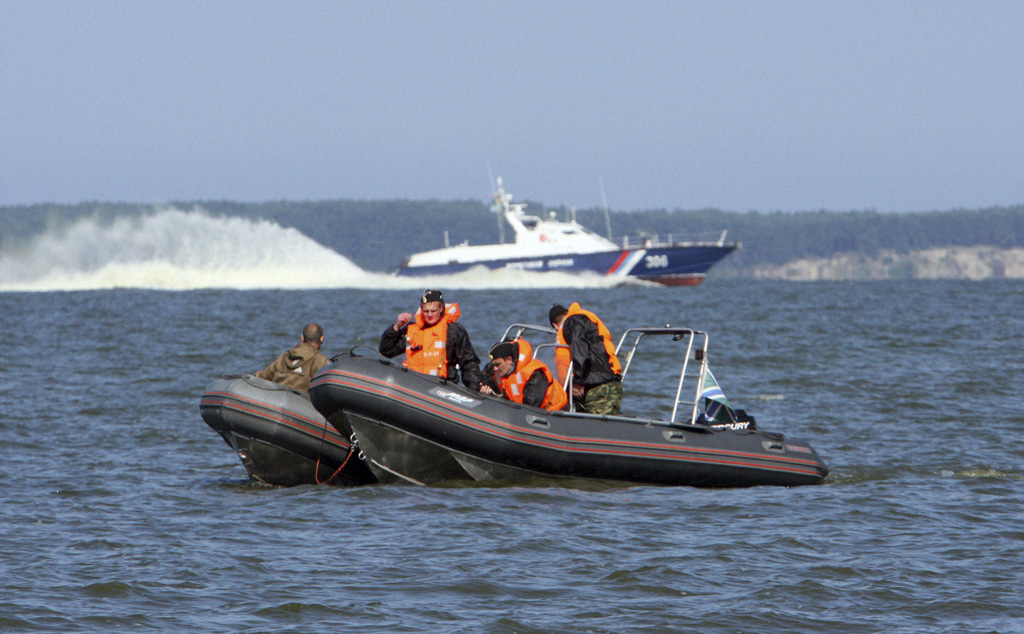
Border guards of the Federal Security Service pursuing trespassers of the maritime boundary during exercises in Kaliningrad Oblast

The Federal Border Guard Service (FPS) has been part of the FSB since 2003. Russia has 61,000 kilometers (38,000 mi) of sea and land borders, 7,500 kilometers (4,700 mi) of which is with Kazakhstan, and 4,000 kilometers (2,500 mi) with China. One kilometer (.62 miles) of border protection costs around 1 million rubles per year.

=== Export control ===
The FSB is engaged in the development of Russia's export control strategy and examines drafts of international agreements related to the transfer of dual-use and military commodities and technologies. Its primary role in the nonproliferation sphere is to collect information to prevent the illegal export of controlled nuclear technology and materials.

=== Surveillance ===
In September 2017, WikiLeaks released "Spy Files Russia", revealing how a company called Peter-Service helped state entities gather data on Russian mobile phone users as part of an online surveillance system called the System for Operative Investigative Activities (SORM) with close collaboration with the FSB. SORM-1 is for wiretapping phones. SORM-2 intercepts electronic correspondence and Internet traffic. Beginning in the summer of 2014, SORM-3 has been "on guard" and integrates all telecommunication services in real time.

=== Cyber units ===
In recent years, the FSB has expanded its mission to include foreign intelligence collection and offensive cyber operations. Cyber analysts have referred to FSB hackers as Berserk Bear, Energetic Bear, Gamaredon, TeamSpy, Dragonfly, Havex, Crouching Yeti, and Koala.

The FSB reportedly has two primary centers overseeing its information security and cyber operations. The first is the 16th Center, which houses most of the FSB's signals intelligence capabilities. The FSB also includes the 18th Center for Information Security, which oversees domestic operations and security but conducts foreign operations as well. The U.S. government indicted 18th Center FSB officers in 2017 for breaching Yahoo! and millions of email accounts. In 2021, Ukrainian intelligence released information and recordings of 18th Center FSB officers based in Crimea as part of the "Gamaredon" hacking group.

According to a 2022 Congressional Research Service report, FSB units can manufacture custom malware tools and manipulate existing malware to mimic other threat actors. The agency also oversees specialized training and research institutes.

One FSB group focuses on reconnaissance and surveillance of critical infrastructure and energy sector targets. Most operations linked to this team appear to be reconnaissance or clandestine surveillance. The targeting of the energy sector has raised concern within the U.S. government. The Department of Homeland Security and the Federal Bureau of Investigation have documented the unit's reconnaissance and noted the possibility of inserting malware to cause future damage in an attack. The U.S. government also has linked the unit to attempts to penetrate state and local government networks in 2020.

Media reporting has documented close connections between the FSB and criminal and civilian hackers, which the FSB reportedly uses to augment and staff its cyber units. The US Department of Justice has indicted multiple Russian hackers for a variety of criminal and state-sponsored cyber activities. Many of these indictments describe the close relationship between criminal hackers and the FSB.

== Organization ==
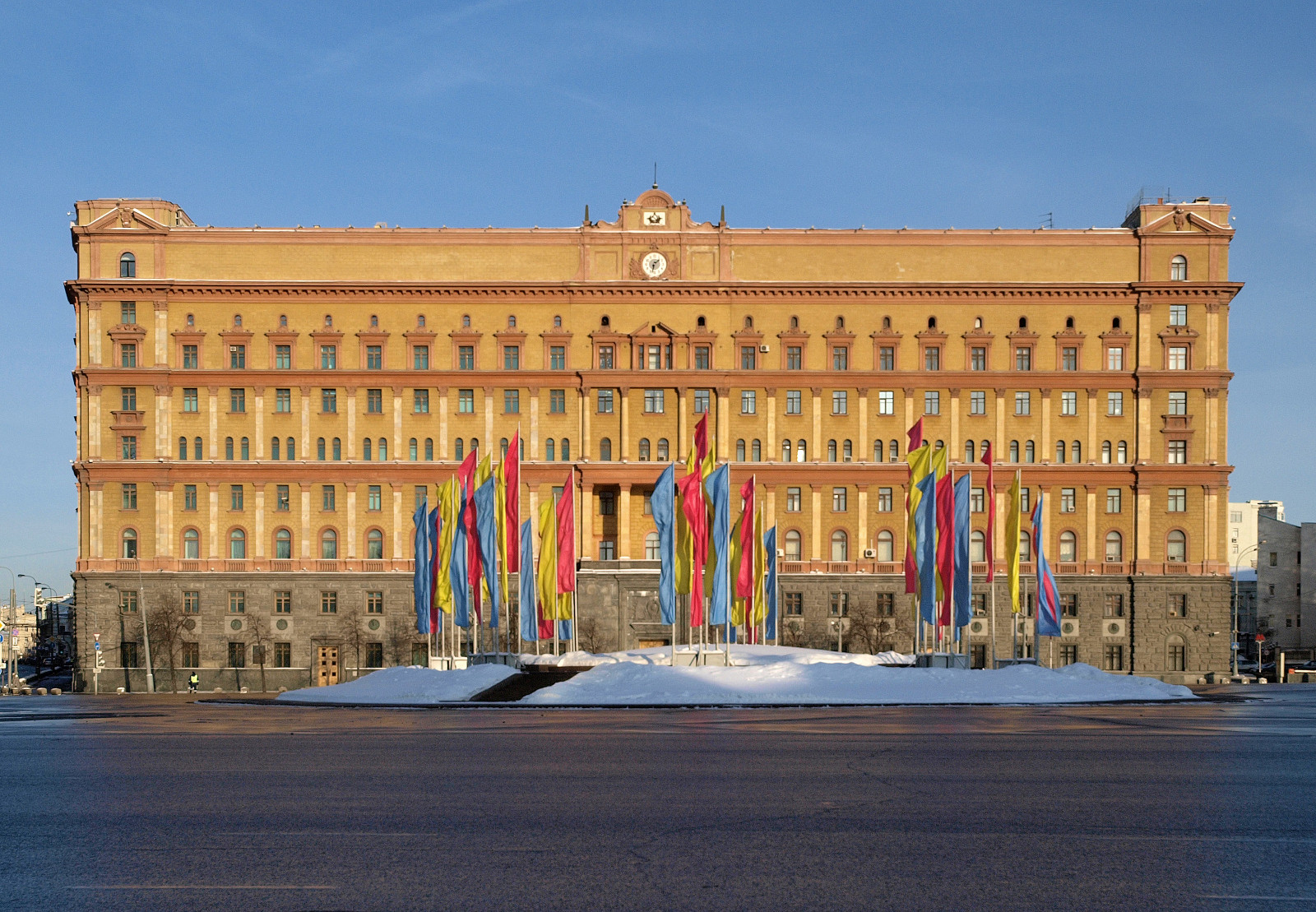
The FSB headquarters at Lubyanka Square

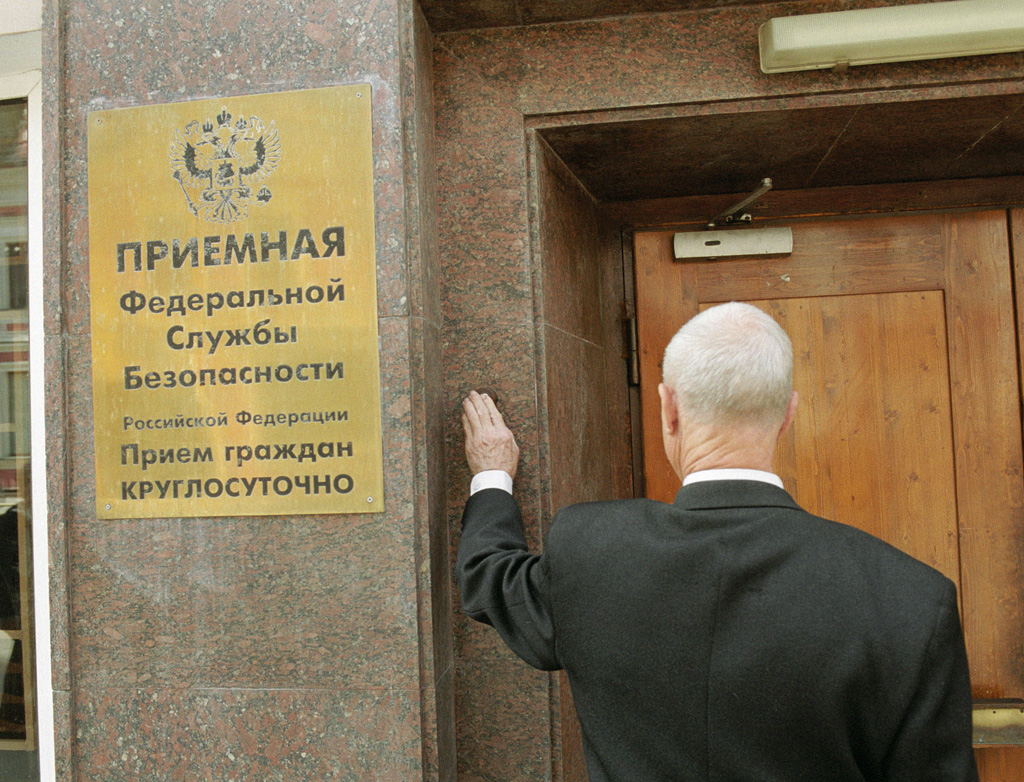
The reception room of the Federal Security Service building located on Kuznetsky Most in Moscow

=== Director ===
Since 2008, the director of the FSB has been General Alexander Bortnikov.

=== First deputy director ===
The current first deputy director of the FSB is Sergei Korolev. He was appointed by Russian president Vladimir Putin on 24 February 2021.

=== Head of scientific and technical service ===
As of 2022, Eduard Chernovoltsev was listed the Head of scientific and technical service of the FSB.

=== Regional structure ===
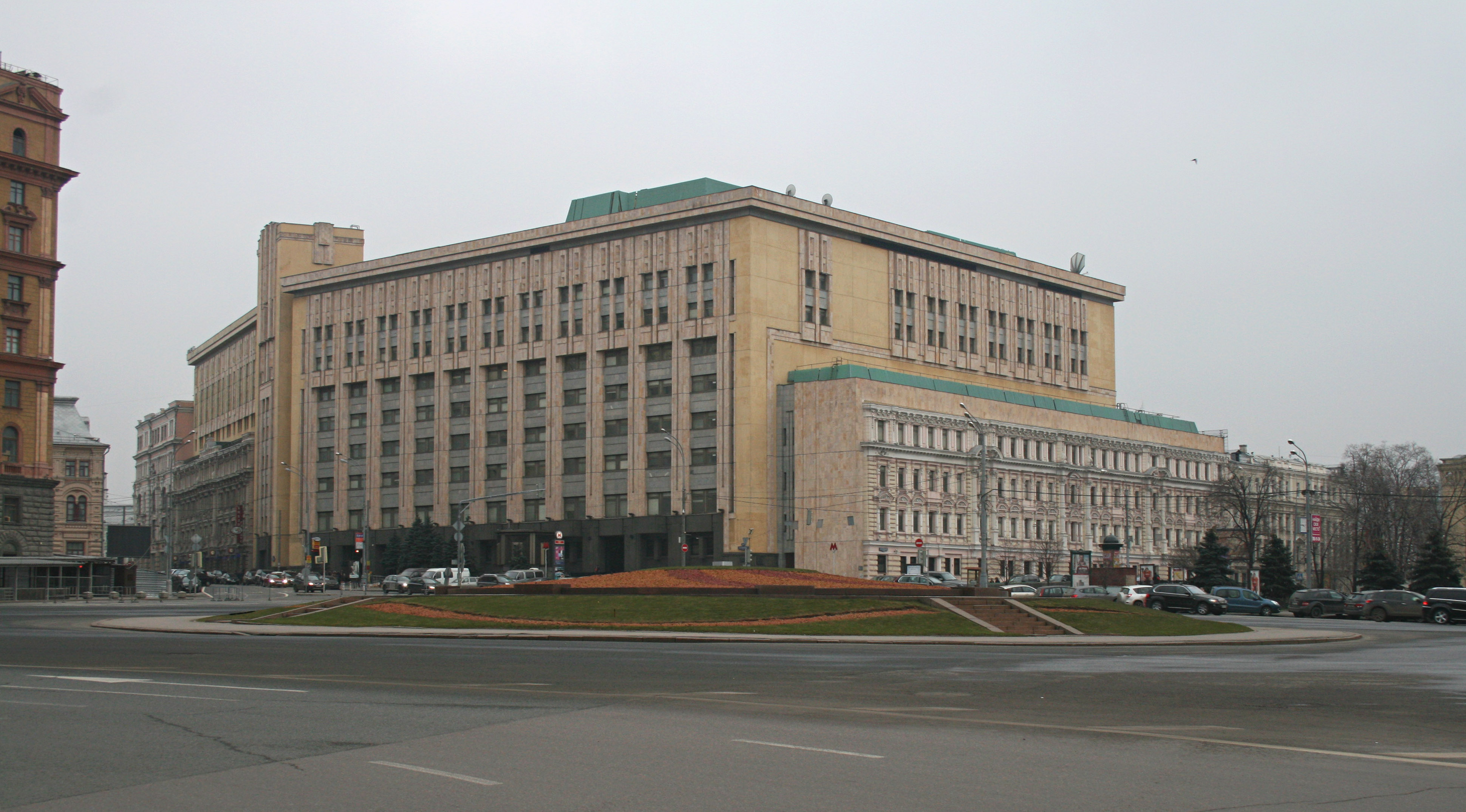
Center of Information Security of the FSB RF, Lubyanka Square

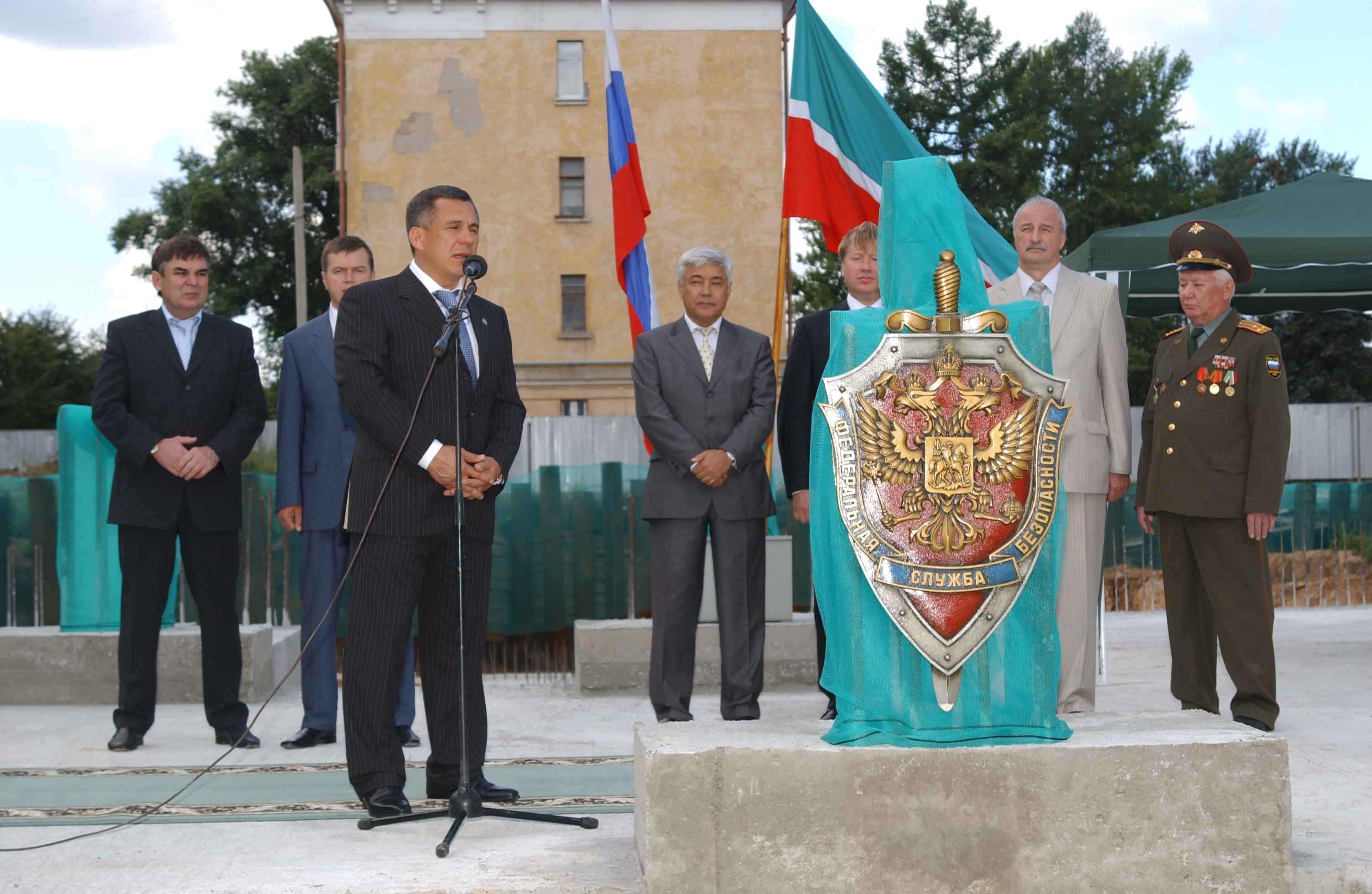
FSB event in Kazan, Tatarstan

Below the nationwide level, the FSB has regional offices in all the federal subjects of Russia. It also has administrations in the armed forces and other military institutions. Sub-departments exist for areas such as aviation, special training centers, forensic expertise, military medicine, etc.

Structure of the Federal Office (incomplete):

- Counterintelligence Service (Department) – chiefs: Vladislav Menshchikov (since 2015), Oleg Syromolotov (2000–2015), Valery Pechyonkin (September 1997 – August 2000)
  - Directorate for the Counterintelligence Support of Strategic Facilities
  - Military Counterintelligence Directorate – chiefs: Alexander Bezverkhny (at least since 2002), Vladimir Petrishchev (since January 1996)
- Service (Department) for Protection of the Constitutional System and the Fight against Terrorism – chiefs: Alexey Sedov (since March 2006), Alexander Bragin (2004 – March 2006), Alexander Zhdankov (2001–2004), German Ugryumov (2000–2001)
  - Directorate for Terrorism and Political Extremism Control – chiefs: Mikhail Belousov, before him Grafov, before the latter Boris Mylnikov (since 2000)
- Economic Security Service (Department) – chiefs: Sergei Alpatov (acting since 4 March 2021), Sergei Korolev (June 2016 to 24 February 2021), Yuri V. Yakovlev (2008 to June 2016), Alexander Bortnikov (2 March 2004 to 2008), Yury Zaostrovtsev (January 2000 – March 2004), Viktor Ivanov (April 1999 – January 2000), Nikolay Patrushev (1998 – April 1999), Alexander Grigoryev (28 August – 1 October 1998).
- Operational Information and International Relations Service (Analysis, Forecasting, and Strategic Planning Department) – chiefs: Sergey Beseda (since 2009), Viktor Komogorov (1999–2009), Sergei Ivanov (1998–1999); The successor of the KGB's Fifth Service, this department is in charge of counterintelligence operations against territories of the former Soviet Union.
- Organizational and Personnel Service (Department) – chiefs: Yevgeny Lovyrev (since 2001), Yevgeny Solovyov (before Lovyrev)
- Department for Activity Provision – chiefs: Mikhail Shekin (since September 2006), Sergey Shishin (before Shekin), Pyotr Pereverzev (as of 2004), Alexander Strelkov (before Pereverzev)
- Border Guard Service – chiefs: Vladimir Kulishov (since 2013), Vladimir Pronichev (2003–2013)
- Control Service – chiefs: Alexander Zhdankov (since 2004)
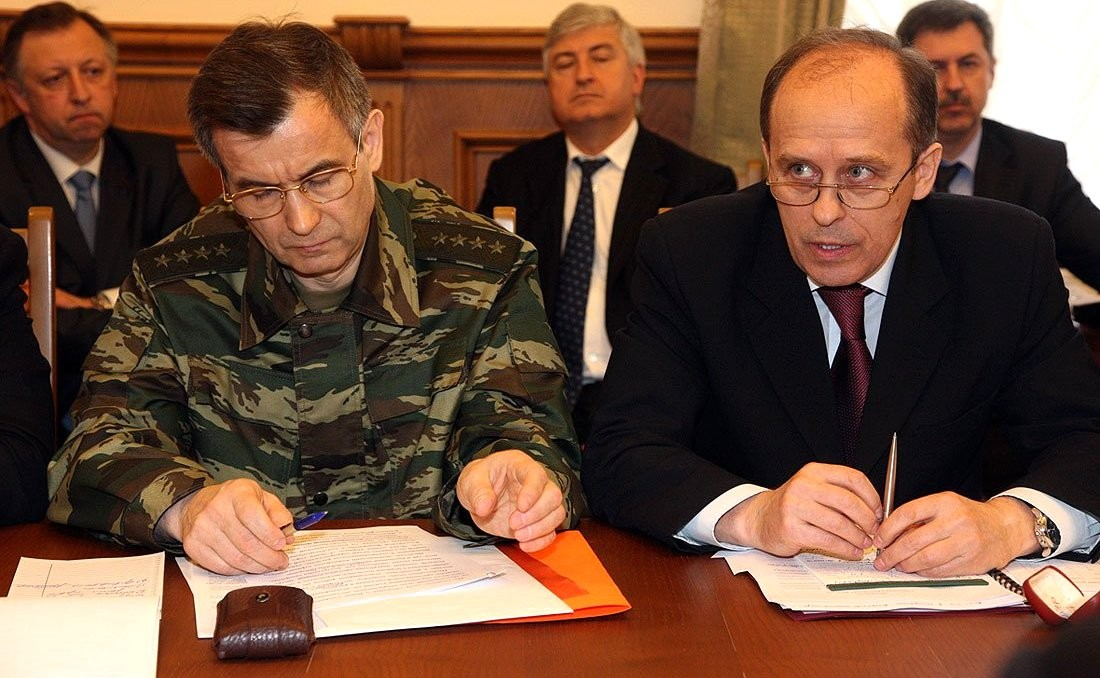
  Rashid Nurgaliyev (left) and Alexander Bortnikov in April 2010
  - Inspection Directorate – chiefs: Vladimir Anisimov (2004 – May 2005), Rashid Nurgaliyev (12 July 2000 – 2002),
  - Internal Security Directorate – chiefs: Alexander Kupryazhkin (until September 2006), Sergei Shishin (before Kupryazhkin since December 2002), Sergei Smirnov (April 1999 – December 2002), Viktor Ivanov (1998 – April 1999), Nikolay Patrushev (1994–1998)
- Science and Engineering Service (Department) – chiefs: Nikolai Klimashin
- Center of Information Security
- Investigation Directorate – chiefs: Nikolay Oleshko (since December 2004), Yury Anisimov (as of 2004), Viktor Milchenko (since 2002), Sergey Balashov (until 2002 since at least 2001), Vladimir Galkin (as of 1997 and 1998)

Besides the services (departments) and directorates of the federal office, the territorial directorates of FSB in the federal subjects are also subordinate to it. Of these, St. Petersburg and Leningrad Oblast Directorate of FSB and its predecessors (historically covering both Leningrad/Saint Petersburg and Leningrad Oblast) have played especially important roles in the history of this organization, as many of the officers of the Directorate, including Vladimir Putin and Nikolay Patrushev, later assumed important positions within the federal FSB office or other government bodies. After the last Chief of the Soviet time, Anatoly Kurkov, the St. Petersburg and Leningrad Oblast Directorate were led by Sergei Stepashin (29 November 1991 – 1992), Viktor Cherkesov (1992–1998), Alexander Grigoryev (1 October 1998 – 5 January 2001), Sergei Smirnov (5 January 2001 – June 2003), Alexander Bortnikov (June 2003 – March 2004) and Yury Ignashchenkov (since March 2004).

=== Directors of the FSB ===
On 20 June 1996, Boris Yeltsin dismissed Director of FSB Mikhail Barsukov and appointed Nikolay Kovalyov as acting Director and later Director of the FSB. Aleksander Bortnikov took over on 12 May 2008.

- Nikolai Golushko, December 1993 – February 1994
- Sergei Stepashin, February 1994 – June 1995
- Mikhail Barsukov, July 1995 – June 1996
- Nikolai Kovalyov, July 1996 – July 1998
- Vladimir Putin, July 1998 – August 1999
- Nikolai Patrushev, August 1999 – 12 May 2008
- Alexander Bortnikov, 12 May 2008 – present

== Criticism ==
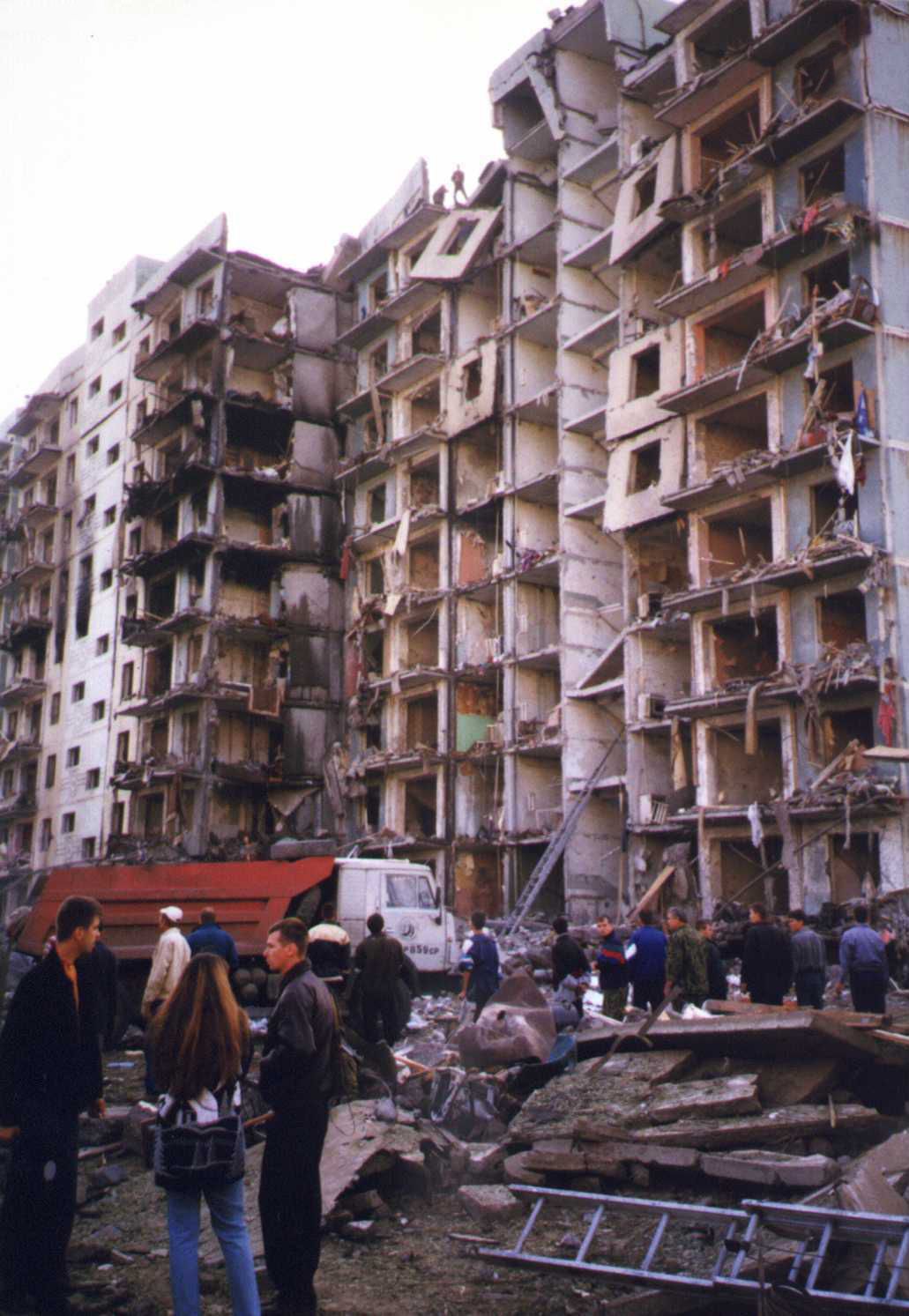
Aftermath of the 1999 Russian apartment bombings

The FSB has been criticised for corruption, human rights violations and secret police activities. Some Kremlin critics such as Alexander Litvinenko have claimed that the FSB is engaged in suppression of internal dissent; Litvinenko died in 2006 as a result of polonium poisoning. Litvinenko, along with a series of other authors such as Yury Felshtinsky, David Satter, Boris Kagarlitsky, Vladimir Pribylovsky, Mikhail Trepashkin, have claimed that the 1999 apartment bombings in Moscow and other Russian cities were a false flag attack coordinated by the FSB in order to win public support for a new full-scale war in Chechnya and boost former FSB director and then prime minister Vladimir Putin's popularity in the lead-up to parliamentary elections and presidential transfer of power. (Note: Attributed to multiple sources:) The FSB has been further criticized by some for failure to bring Islamist terrorism in Russia under control. In the mid-2000s, the pro-Kremlin Russian sociologist Olga Kryshtanovskaya claimed that the FSB played a dominant role in the country's political, economic and even cultural life.

After the annexation of Crimea, the FSB may also have been responsible for the forced disappearances and torture of Crimean Tatar activists and public figures. According to the United Nations, in occupied Crimea, the FSB used torture with elements of sexual violence against pro-Ukrainian activists, forcing them to confess to crimes related to terrorism. The detainees were, allegedly, beaten, tortured with electric shocks in the genitals and threatened with rape. Some, such as Oleh Sentsov, have been detained and accused in politically motivated kangaroo courts. The FSB spied on and filmed a gathering of members of the Jehovah's Witnesses while they were about to undergo baptism rites, with the videos used as evidence in a trial against the defendants in 2021; Jehovah's Witnesses have been banned as a group in Russia since 2017 for "extremism".

In spite of various anti-corruption actions of the Russian government, FSB operatives and officials are routinely found in the center of various fraud, racket and corruption scandals. FSB officers have been frequently accused of torture, extortion, bribery and illegal takeovers of private companies, often working together with tax inspection officers. Active and former FSB officers are also present as "curators" in "almost every single large enterprise", both in public and private sectors. Several unnamed current and former officials described the FSB as less effective than the KGB, describing it as "rife with corruption, beset by bureaucratic bloat and ultimately out of touch", in a report by The Washington Post in 2022.

On 29 December 2016, the White House accused and sanctioned the FSB and several other Russian companies for what the US intelligence agencies said was their role in helping the Russian military intelligence service, the Main Intelligence Directorate (GRU) disrupt and spread disinformation during the 2016 US presidential election. In addition, the State Department also declared 35 Russian diplomats and officials persona non-grata and denied Russian government officials access to two Russian-owned installations in Maryland and New York.

An investigation by Bellingcat and The Insider implicated FSB agents in the poisoning of opposition leader Alexei Navalny in August 2020, where he became ill during a flight.

It was reported that during the 2022 Russian invasion of Ukraine, FSB officers carried out filtration activities in Mariupol, which were accompanied by searches, interrogations, forced deportations to Russia, beatings and torture.

According to an investigative report by Novaya Gazeta, some of the suspicious deaths of Russian businesspeople in 2022–2023 may possibly be connected to large scale accounting fraud by Gazprom executives, who may have funneled money to a network of businesses owned by friends and family members with ties to the FSB and Russian military.

=== Role in the Russian doping scandal ===
Following the broadcast of a documentary film alleging systematic doping in Russia, World Anti-Doping Agency (WADA) president Craig Reedie authorized an Independent Commission (IC) to investigate the issues brought up by the documentary in 2015. The IC authorized a review of practices on whether there were any breaches by the Russian Anti-Doping Agency. The report found direct interference into the laboratory's operations by the Russian State undermined the laboratory's independence and that tests conducted by the laboratory were highly suspect. The report elaborates on the role of the FSB:

[A] laboratory staff member reported that an FSB agent regularly visits the Moscow laboratory. The IC sources within the laboratory identified the FSB agent as Evgeniy Blotkin/Blokhin. Sources reported that Moscow laboratory Director Rodchenkov was required to meet with Evgeniy Blotkin weekly to update him on the "mood of WADA". One laboratory staff member provided information to IC investigators about the suspected bugging or wiretapping of telephones, while another staff member reported that office spaces within the Moscow laboratory were monitored (bugged) by the FSB in order to be informed of the laboratory's activities. This could not be independently verified by the IC, but the reported statements demonstrate the perceptions of laboratory officials, who believe they are under constant state surveillance. This perception is also fuelled by the FSB's regular visits to the laboratory and the questioning of its staff members. For example, the IC learned that staff members were routinely questioned by FSB upon their return from global laboratory and WADA seminars. Following the airing of the ARD documentary, select laboratory staff members were directed by the FSB not to cooperate with the WADA investigation.

— World Anti-Doping Agency, The Independent Commission Report #1, 13.4 FSB Influence

In January 2016, the head of Russia's anti-doping laboratory Grigory Rodchenkov fled Russia and exposed the doping program, which included members of the FSB replacing tainted urine samples with older, clean ones. As a result of the scandals the International Association of Athletics Federations suspended Russia from all international athletic competitions including the 2016 Summer Olympics.

In July 2016, the first McLaren Report found that "beyond a reasonable doubt" the Russian Ministry of Sport, the Centre of Sports Preparation of the National Teams of Russia, the FSB, and the WADA-accredited laboratory in Moscow "operated for the protection of doped Russian athletes" within a "state-directed failsafe system" using "the disappearing positive [test] methodology". In a second McLaren Report released December 2016, it was found that

In the period before the Sochi Games, a "clean urine bank" was established at the FSB Command Centre, which was situated immediately adjacent to the Sochi Laboratory. Inside that building a dedicated room containing several large freezers was set up for the purpose of storing the clean urine samples.

=== Crocus City Hall attack ===
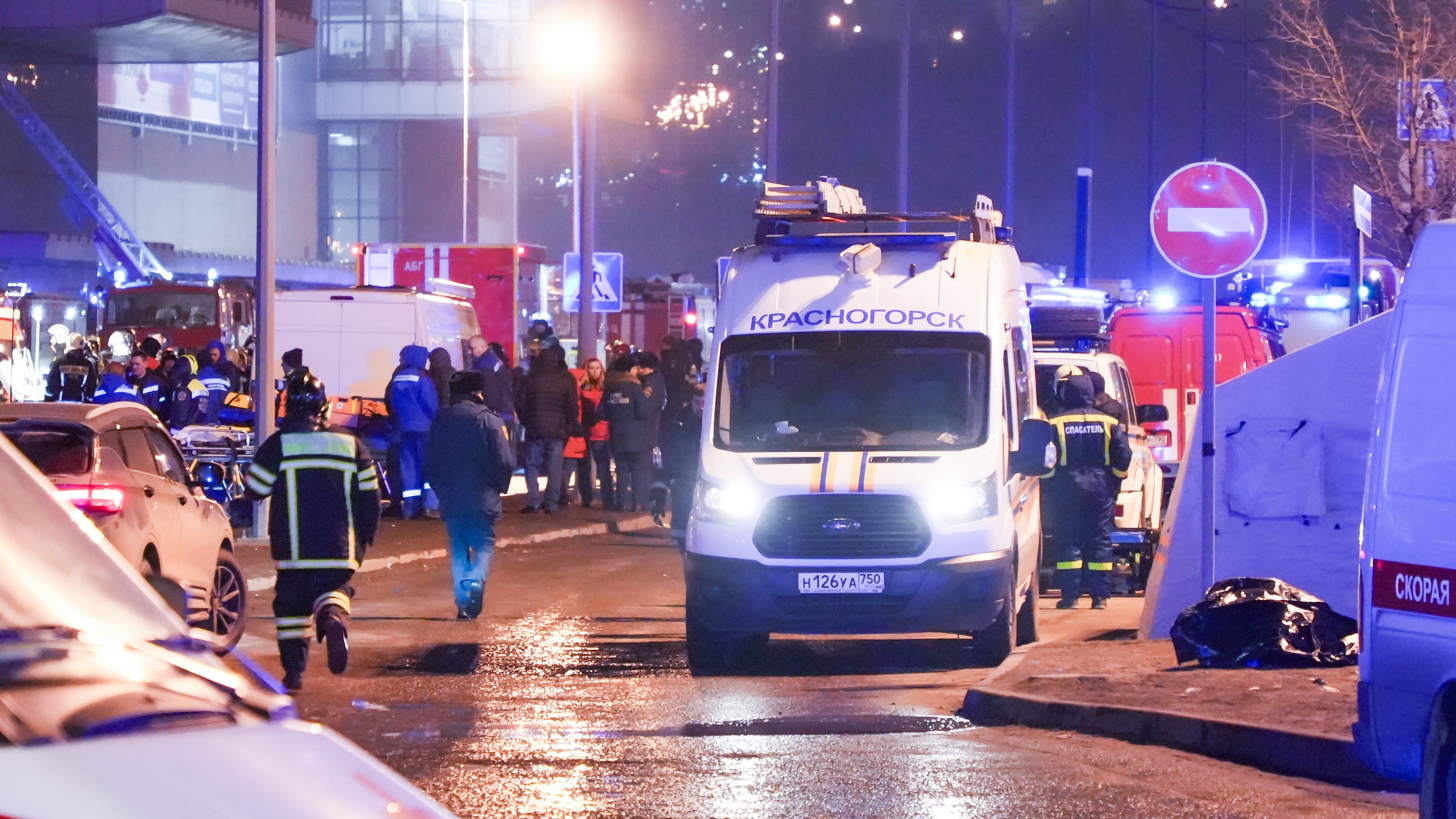
Emergency services responding to the Crocus City Hall attack

On 7 March 2024, the United States Embassy in Moscow warned that "extremists have imminent plans to target large gatherings in Moscow, to include concerts". That day, the US also privately warned Russian officials of the danger of an impending attack from IS–KP from intelligence gathered earlier in March, under the US intelligence community's "duty to warn" requirement, specifically mentioning the Crocus City Hall venue. Ten days after the attack it was reported that Iran had also warned Russia that a major "terrorist operation" was being planned, based on information gathered from IS militants arrested after the 2024 Kerman bombings.

Three days before the Crocus City Hall attack, President Vladimir Putin told the board of the FSB that Western warnings of a potential attack inside Russia were "provocative" and "resemble outright blackmail and the intention to intimidate and destabilise our society".

On 22 March 2024, four Tajik ISIS–K gunmen launched an attack on a concert hall in Krasnogorsk, Russia, with rifles and incendiaries. The attack, claimed by ISIS–K, killed 151 and injured 609 and marked the deadliest attack on Russian soil since the Beslan school siege in 2004. Putin and the FSB suggested that Ukraine was involved in the attack, without offering evidence. Alexander Bortnikov, the head of the FSB, said that "radical Islamists" prepared the attack with help from Ukrainian and Western "special services". Bortnikov claimed that the US warning was "of a general nature".

IS-affiliated Amaq News Agency published a video filmed by one of the attackers. Ukraine denied any involvement in the attack, and described the FSB's claims that the perpetrators of the Crocus City Hall attack tried to escape to Ukraine as "very doubtful and primitive" disinformation, recalling that the border is heavily guarded by soldiers and drones, mined in many areas, and constantly shelled from both sides. A short video on Telegram allegedly showed one of the suspects being tortured by FSB agents, who cut off his ear and forced him to eat it.

Navalny associate Ivan Zhdanov criticized Russian security services for their "catastrophic incompetence" and the FSB for being "busy with everything except its direct responsibilities—killing their political opponents, spying on citizens and prosecuting people who are against the war." Another associate, Leonid Volkov, said that the FSB "can't do the only job it really should be doing: preventing a real, nightmarish terrorist attack." Novaya Gazeta Europe's chief editor, Kirill Martynov, criticized Putin for dismissing Western intelligence warnings and focusing resources on "LGBT extremists" and the war with Ukraine instead of guarding against "real threats".

=== August 2024 Kursk Oblast incursion ===
In August 2024, Ukrainian forces crossed the border into Kursk Oblast during the ongoing Russian invasion of Ukraine resulting in part of the oblast becoming under Ukrainian occupation. All legal national borders of Russia are controlled by the FSB Border Guard under the command of FSB director Alexander Bortnikov. Since most of the best Russian troops were deployed in Ukraine, most of the men guarding the border in the Kursk Oblast were young, inexperienced conscripts from the FSB Border Service and lightly equipped army infantry units (all male citizens of Russia aged 18–30 are subject to conscription for one year of active duty military service), who suffered heavy losses in combat with experienced Ukrainian troops. Some of the conscripts stationed on the border with Ukraine were even purportedly unarmed.

=== FSB detention centers ===
In July 2025, the State Duma passed a law officially restoring the FSB's authority to operate its own detention centers. Russian investigative journalists Andrei Soldatov and Irina Borogan described the legislation as "a foundation for a new Gulag” and predicted a major expansion of political repression in Russia: "Special railcars, ships, aircraft, powers to transport prisoners, and the authority to rule and punish within prison walls—all of this, under FSB control, points to preparations for repressions on a scale we haven't yet seen." FSB detention centers would hold prisoners accused of treason, espionage, terrorism, and extremism. According to human rights activist Ivan Astashin, "The transfer of some detention centres to the FSB's jurisdiction will lead to them effectively becoming unaccountable to supervisory bodies."

== See also ==
- Awards of the Federal Security Service of the Russian Federation
- Federal Protective Service, government protection agency
- Intelligence agencies of Russia
- SORM, law that allows the FSB to monitor communications
- Third Section of His Imperial Majesty's Own Chancellery
- Vulkan files leak
