= Department of Counterintelligence Operations =

Department of the Russian Federal Security Service

- Департамент контрразведывательных операций

Department overview
- Formed: 1998
- Headquarters: Moscow, Russia
- Department executive: Dmitry Minaev, director
- Parent Department: 1st Service of the Federal Security Service (FSB)

The Department of Counterintelligence Operations (DKRO; Russian: Департамент контрразведывательных операций; ДКРО) is a department of the Federal Security Service (FSB) of Russia officially in charge of counterintelligence operations. It is led by Dmitry Minaev, and supervised by the First Service of the FSB, which is led by Vladislav Menshchikov.

== History ==
The DKRO was created in 1998. It has a legal basis in Article 9 of Federal law 40-FZ of 1995, which was signed by President Yeltsin, and which defines the role of counterintelligence services in Russia.

However, the FSB's counterintelligence predecessor, the Federal Counterintelligence Service, was a successor to the KGB; the KGB's Second Main Directorate had long history of counterintelligence work, stretching back to the Cheka. The FSB's own view of its counterintelligence history focusses on activities in World War II. As of 2024, the FSB's director is Alexander Bortnikov, who previously served in counterintelligence units of the KGB during the Cold War.

== Activities ==
The DKRO is responsible for "counterintelligence" work against foreigners in Russia; ostensibly against foreign intelligence agencies but also against tourists, journalists, and embassy workers. It harasses Western diplomats and journalists. In addition to arrests such as Evan Gershkovich, it follows the cars of diplomats (and their family members), cuts the power to their homes or breaks into them, and leaves human feces as a "calling card". In one case, DKRO agents killed a diplomat's dog. It has been involved in the detentions of at least three Americans.

The DKRO has also been involved in the Russian invasion of Ukraine.

The DKRO has been involved in "monitoring" of the Russian Foreign Ministry, which led to corruption, as officers extorted money from security companies.

According to an internal report by the DKRO's 7th Service, which is responsible for countering espionage from China and other parts of Asia, the Russian intelligence establishment viewed China as one of its major threats despite the close relationship between the two countries in public, especially so following the Russian invasion of Ukraine in 2022.
