= Viktor Cherkesov =

Russian security services official (1950–2022)

- Виктор Черкесов
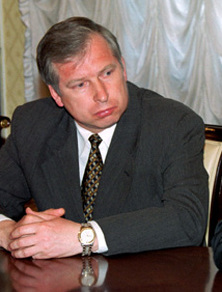
- Cherkesov in 2000

Head of the Federal Agency for the Supply of Arms, Military, Special Equipment and Material Resources
- In office 12 May 2008 – 2010
- Preceded by: Aleksandr Denisov
- Succeeded by: Nadezhda Sinikova

Director of the Federal Drug Control Service
- In office 11 March 2003 – 12 May 2008

1st Presidential Envoy to the Northwestern Federal District
- In office 18 May 2000 – 11 March 2003
- President: Vladimir Putin
- Preceded by: Office established
- Succeeded by: Valentina Matviyenko

Personal details
- Born: Viktor Vasilyevich Cherkesov; 13 July 1950 Leningrad, Russian SFSR, USSR
- Died: 8 November 2022 (aged 72) Saint Petersburg, Russia
- Education: Leningrad State University

Viktor Vasilyevich Cherkesov (Russian: Виктор Васильевич Черкесов; 13 July 1950 – 8 November 2022) was a Russian security services official.

== Biography ==
Cherkesov graduated from the Law Department of Leningrad State University in 1973. In 1975–1991, he worked in Leningrad and Leningrad Oblast Directorate of KGB and prosecuted political dissidents, including members of the Democratic Union.

From 1992 to August 1998, Cherkesov led Saint Petersburg Directorate of MBR/FSK/FSB, successor organization to KGB.

From August 1998 to May 2000, he was a First Deputy Director of FSB under Vladimir Putin and Nikolai Patrushev. From 18 May 2000 to 11 March 2003, he was President Vladimir Putin's plenipotentiary envoy to the Northwestern Federal District.

From 11 March 2003 until his death, he was head of the State Committee for the Control of the Circulation of Narcotic and Psychotropic Substances of the Russian Federation (since March 2004 – Federal Drug Control Service of Russia).

In early October 2007, several senior officers of the Federal Drug Control Service were arrested by agents of the FSB, which was considered by analysts as part of a longtime battle between Viktor Cherkesov, Igor Sechin and other members of Vladimir Putin's inner circle.

On 9 October 2007, an article signed by Cherkesov was published in Kommersant, where it was claimed that the Russian Drug Enforcement Administration officials detained on criminal charges earlier that month are the exception rather than the rule, that the turf battle among the secret services could undermine the nation's stability, and that the only scenario for Russia that is both realistic enough and relatively favorable is to continue evolution into a corporativist state ruled by security services officials.

On 27 October 2007, two officers of Russian Drug Enforcement Administration were poisoned to death, which was a part of the power struggle between the clans of Russian siloviks, according to Vladimir Pribylovsky. "The entire political system of Russia today is a struggle of various clans and groups fighting to see that Putin stays in power according to their scenario and not according to the scenario of their competitors," said economist Mikhail Delyagin.

On 12 May 2008, he was sacked by President Dmitry Medvedev as Head of the State Committee for the Control of the Circulation of Narcotic and Psychotropic Substances and appointed by Prime-Minister Vladimir Putin Head of the Federal Agency for the Procurement of Military and Special Equipment. This was perceived as retaliation for discussing infighting within Putin's inner circle in an op-ed in the Kommersant newspaper. Vladimir Putin had in turn chastised Cherkesov for the piece, saying during the TV program "Direct Line with Vladimir Putin" that "one who makes claims about the secret service war must first themselves be blameless."

Cherkesov died in Saint Petersburg on 8 November 2022, at the age of 72.

== See also ==
- Three Whales Corruption Scandal

Political offices
Preceded by Sergei Stepashin	Chief of the St. Petersburg and Leningrad Oblast MBR/FSK/FSB Directorate; 1992 – August 1998	Succeeded by Alexander Grigoryev
Preceded by N/A	Russian president's Envoy to the Northwestern Federal District; 18 May 2000 – 11 March 2003	Succeeded by Valentina Matviyenko
