= Yury Zaostrovtsev =

Russian security services official and businessman

Zaostrovtsev Yury Yevgenyevich
- Заостровцев Юрий Евгеньевич
- Born: September 10, 1956 (age 69); Moscow

Yury Yevgenyevich Zaostrovtsev (in Russian: Юрий Евгеньевич Заостровцев, born 1956) is a Russian security services official and businessman. He is a son of Yevgeny Zaostrovtsev, former Chief of the Karelian KGB Directorate.

Until 1993 Yury Zaostrovtsev also had worked in KGB and its successors. In 1998–2004 he served in the Federal Security Service (FSB), in 2000–2004 as a First deputy Director and the Head of the Economic Security Department. Since August 2000 he has been a member of the board of directors of Sovkomflot. In 2004–2007 he was a first deputy chairman of the board of directors of Vnesheconombank.

== See also ==
- Three Whales Corruption Scandal

Political offices
Preceded by Viktor Ivanov	Chief of the Economic Security Department of FSB; 2000–2004	Succeeded by Alexander Bortnikov
