= Alexander Bortnikov =

Russian official (born 1951)

- Александр Бортников
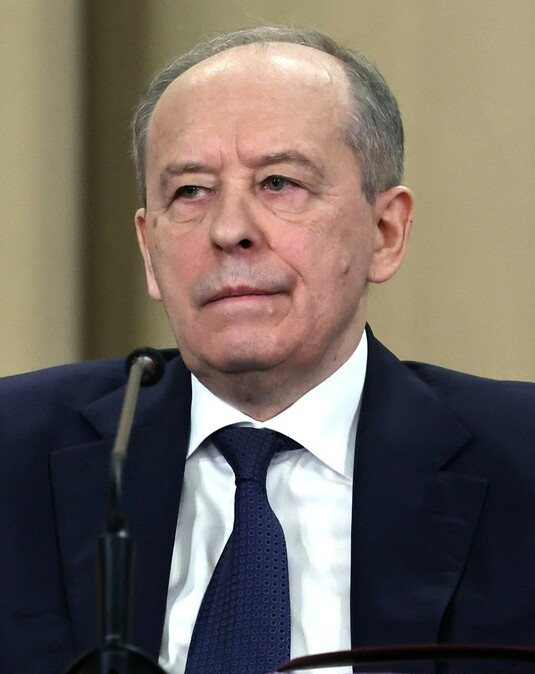
- Bortnikov in 2025

Director of the Federal Security Service
- Incumbent
- Assumed office 12 May 2008
- President: Vladimir Putin; Dmitry Medvedev
- Deputy: Sergei Korolev; Sergei Smirnov (2003–2020)
- Preceded by: Nikolai Patrushev

Personal details
- Born: Alexander Vasilyevich Bortnikov; 15 November 1951 (age 74) Molotov, Russian SFSR, Soviet Union
- Party: CPSU (1975–1991)
- Spouse: Tatyana Borisovna
- Children: Denis Bortnikov
- Education: FSB Academy
- Alma mater: Leningrad Institute of Railway Engineers
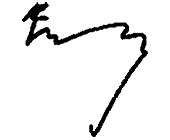
- Signature

Military service
- Allegiance: Soviet Union (1975-1991); Russia (1991-present)
- Service: KGB (1975-1991); Federal Counterintelligence Service (1994-1995); Federal Security Service (1995-present)
- Service years: 1975–present
- Rank: General of the Army
- Conflicts: Second Chechen War; Russo-Georgian War; Syrian Civil War; Russo-Ukrainian War

Alexander Vasilyevich Bortnikov (Russian: Алекса́ндр Васи́льевич Бо́ртников; born 15 November 1951) is a Russian intelligence officer who has served as the director of the Federal Security Service (FSB) since 2008. He is one of the most powerful members of the silovik faction of president Vladimir Putin's inner circle. (Note: Other siloviki close to Bortnikov include Igor Sechin, Nikolai Patrushev, and Viktor Ivanov.) A Hero of the Russian Federation since 2019, he also holds the rank of General of the Army, the second highest grade in use in the Russian military. (Note: The one higher rank, the five star Marshal of the Russian Federation, has been held only by Igor Sergeyev, who was elevated to the rank in 1997 and died in 2006. The rank has not been used since.) According to some experts, it is likely Bortnikov played a key role in Putin's decision to invade Ukraine in 2022.

== Early life and career ==
Bortnikov was born in Molotov, Russian SFSR, Soviet Union (now Perm, Russia) in 1951. In 1966, he joined Komsomol, the Communist Party's youth wing. He graduated from the Leningrad Institute of Railway Engineers in 1973, joining the Communist Party nearly immediately upon graduation. He then worked as a railway engineer in Gatchina for two years before joining the Committee for State Security (KGB) in 1975. He spent the next 28 years working for the KGB, its interim successor the Federal Counterintelligence Service (FSK), and ultimately the FSB, based in Leningrad/Saint Petersburg for the entire period. According to The Times of London, Bortnikov and Vladimir Putin first met while both stationed in Leningrad in the 1970s, however Bortnikov has never elaborated on rumors about their first meeting.

Bortnikov's break came in June 2003, when Sergey Smirnov, chief of the Saint Petersburg and Leningrad Oblast FSB, was sent to Moscow to become the principal deputy to the director of the agency amid the Three Whales Corruption Scandal. Bortnikov was promoted to fill the vacancy. On 24 February 2004 he was moved to Moscow and made chief of the Economic Security Service of the FSB, a deputy director of the agency. Sergey Naryshkin, the current head of the Foreign Intelligence Service (SVR), was transferred from St. Petersburg to Moscow at the same time.

In February 2007, Russian magazine The New Times wrote about the plan to murder defected FSB officer Alexander Litvinenko with reference to a source in the FSB, alleging "head of the FSB Economic Security Department general-lieutenant Alexander Bortnikov had allegedly been appointed overseer of the operation."

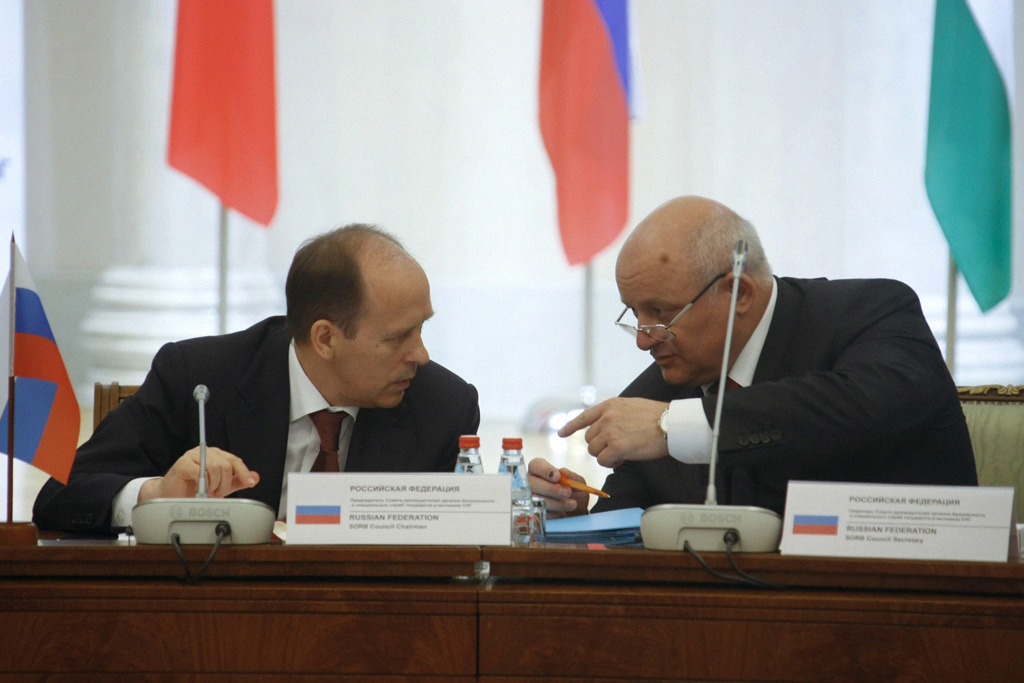
Bortnikov with Alexei Kuzyura at a meeting of the CIS security agencies and special services chiefs in 2010

In May 2007, he was reported to have been implicated in a money laundering case investigated by the Russian Interior Ministry in connection with the murder of the Central Bank Deputy Head Andrey Kozlov.

== Director of the FSB ==
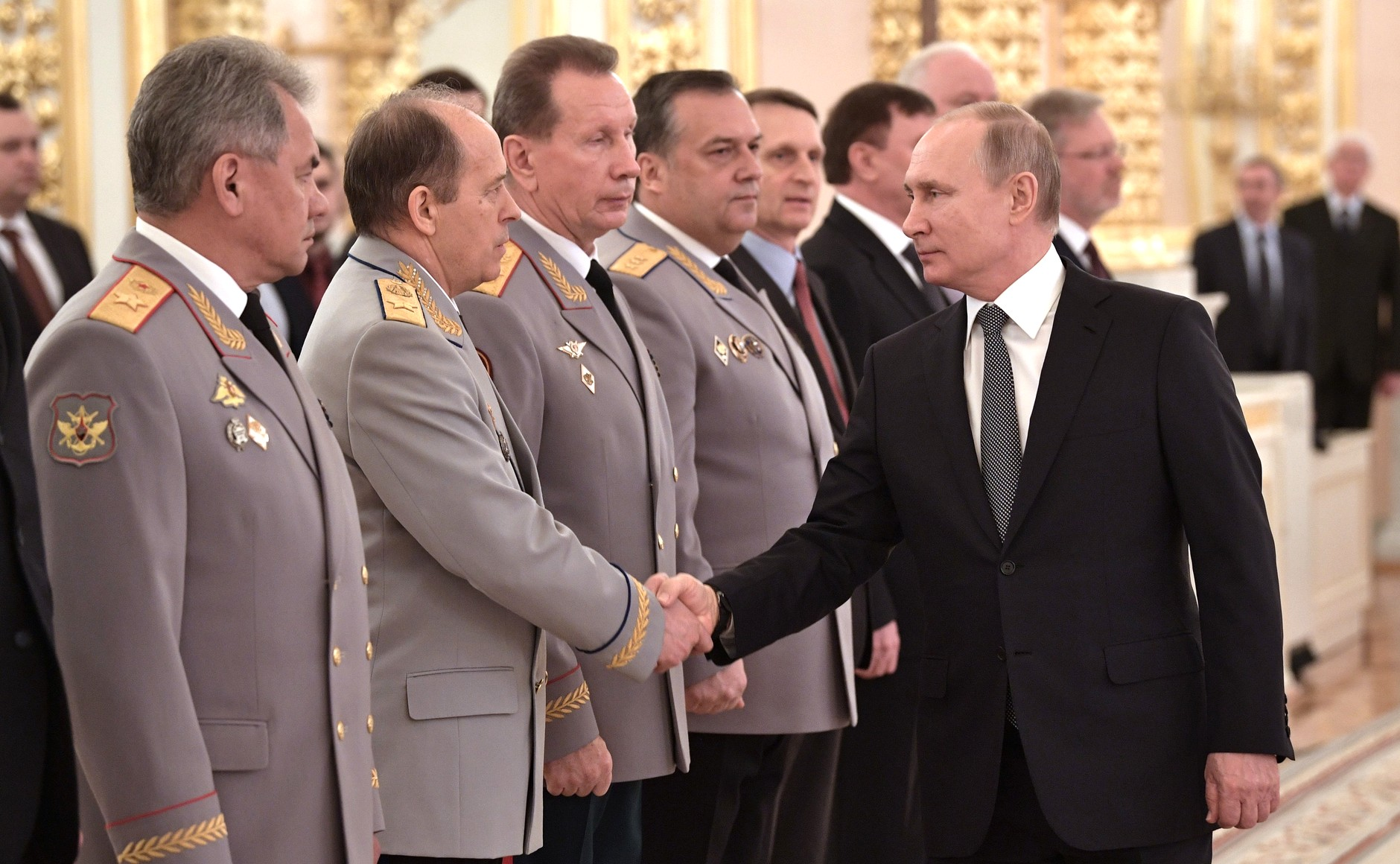
Putin with Bortnikov, Shoigu, Viktor Zolotov, Sergey Naryshkin and other senior Kremlin officials on 11 April 2019

On 12 May 2008, Bortnikov was appointed Director of the FSB by president Dmitry Medvedev. His tenure as FSB director has seen the agency return to the "punishing sword" once ascribed to the Cheka.

Bortnikov is widely seen as a hawk and a willing participant in the Russian government's political repression at home and subversion abroad, however, compared to his peers, Bortnikov has a reputation as one of the more individually honest figures. One former FSB officer claimed Bortnikov is "uncomfortable with the condition of the agency, the blatant corruption, the indiscipline, the mercenaryism. But he doesn't know what to do about it, and thinks it's not as important as doing the [political] job'."

In a December 2017 open letter published by Kommersant, more than 30 Russian academics criticized Bortnikov for attempting to legitimize the Stalinist Great Purge in an interview he gave to Rossiiskaya Gazeta on the hundredth anniversary of the establishment of the Cheka, in which Bortnikov said the archives showed "a significant part" of the criminal cases of that period "had an objective side to them." Nikita Petrov, a historian who studies the Soviet security services for Memorial, condemned Bortnikov's claims as legal nihilism in an interview with Novaya Gazeta.

Bortnikov and his son Denis are members of the Navalny 35, a list of Russian human rights abusers compiled by Alexei Navalny, both have been subsequently sanctioned by the United States, European Union, United Kingdom, Canada, and New Zealand.

In March 2021, a law was enacted to allow presidential appointees like Bortnikov (who turned 70 in 2022) to serve past statutory retirement age.

=== Russian invasion of Ukraine ===
Sources say Putin's decision to invade Ukraine in February 2022 was influenced by a small group of war hawks around him, including Nikolai Patrushev, Yury Kovalchuk and Alexander Bortnikov. Bortnikov's FSB convinced Putin that most Ukrainians would welcome Russian troops as liberators. Konstantine Skorkin, a Russia expert at the Carnegie Center, told New Voice of Ukraine in an interview that Bortnikov and Patrushev were formed by the Cold War between the United States and the Soviet Union and "believe that a bloc confrontation with the West is a reasonable and correct world order. And in order to return to a predictable and manageable confrontation, it is necessary to divide the zones of influence through war, even with the risk of a clash with NATO. According to Patrushev and Bortnikov, Ukraine should be in the Russian zone of influence".

On 20 March 2022, the Security Service of Ukraine (SBU) alleged that Bortnikov was a favorite to replace Vladimir Putin among a group of Russian elites plotting to assassinate Putin in a bid to stabilize the economy and reestablish ties with the West following sanctions imposed on Russia for the 2022 invasion of Ukraine.

On 25 March 2022, The Moscow Times noted that Bortnikov had disappeared from public view since around 11 March 2022, along with other senior siloviki including Sergey Shoigu, Igor Kostyukov and Viktor Zolotov. In response state TV programs subsequently broadcast a purported 24 March security council meeting including brief appearances by many of the missing men, including Bortnikov, but it appeared to simply be an edited version of the earlier 11 March security council meeting.

Shortly after the 2023 Wagner Group mutiny, Belarus president Lukashenko praised Bortnikov (together with Yunus-bek Yevkurov) for mediating the end of the rebellion.

In August 2024, Bortnikov was made head of the "counterterrorism operation" in Kursk, Belgorod, and Bryansk oblasts amidst the August 2024 Kursk Oblast incursion. Russia's state borders are controlled by the FSB Border Service, and conscripts from the FSB Border Service unsuccessfully defended the Russia–Ukraine border in the Kursk Oblast. Bortnikov called the Ukrainian offensive "a terrorist attack" and accused Ukraine of attacking civilians and civilian infrastructure "with the support of the collective West."

In August of 2026 CIA Director John Ratcliffe flew to Moscow to meet SVR foreign intelligence chief Sergey Naryshkin and FSB director Alexander Bortnikov. Ratcliffe offered a bleak assessment of Russia's outlook for victory and conditions in Russia Some United States officials reported the trip was a warning about any attempted incursions into Baltic States. The Trump administration denied these claims and sources reported that Ratcliffe sought to jump start a diplomatic solution calling, Bortnikov, "a constructive player who could help restart diplomatic efforts."

=== Criticism ===
In March 2024, four Tajik ISIS–K gunmen launched an attack on a concert hall in Krasnogorsk, Russia, with rifles and incendiaries. The attack, claimed by ISIS–K, killed 144 and injured 551 and marked the deadliest attack on Russian soil since the Beslan school siege in 2004. Putin and the FSB suggested that Ukraine was involved in the attack, without offering evidence. Bortnikov said that "radical Islamists" prepared the attack with help from Ukrainian and Western "special services".

Navalny associate Ivan Zhdanov criticized Russian security services for their "catastrophic incompetence" and the FSB for being "busy with everything except its direct responsibilities – killing their political opponents, spying on citizens and prosecuting people who are against the war." Another associate, Leonid Volkov, said that the FSB "can't do the only job it really should be doing: preventing a real, nightmarish terrorist attack."

=== Diplomatic role ===
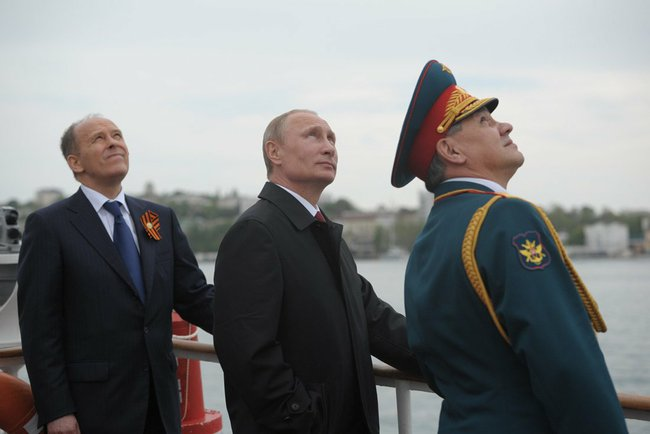
Bortnikov with Vladimir Putin and Sergei Shoigu

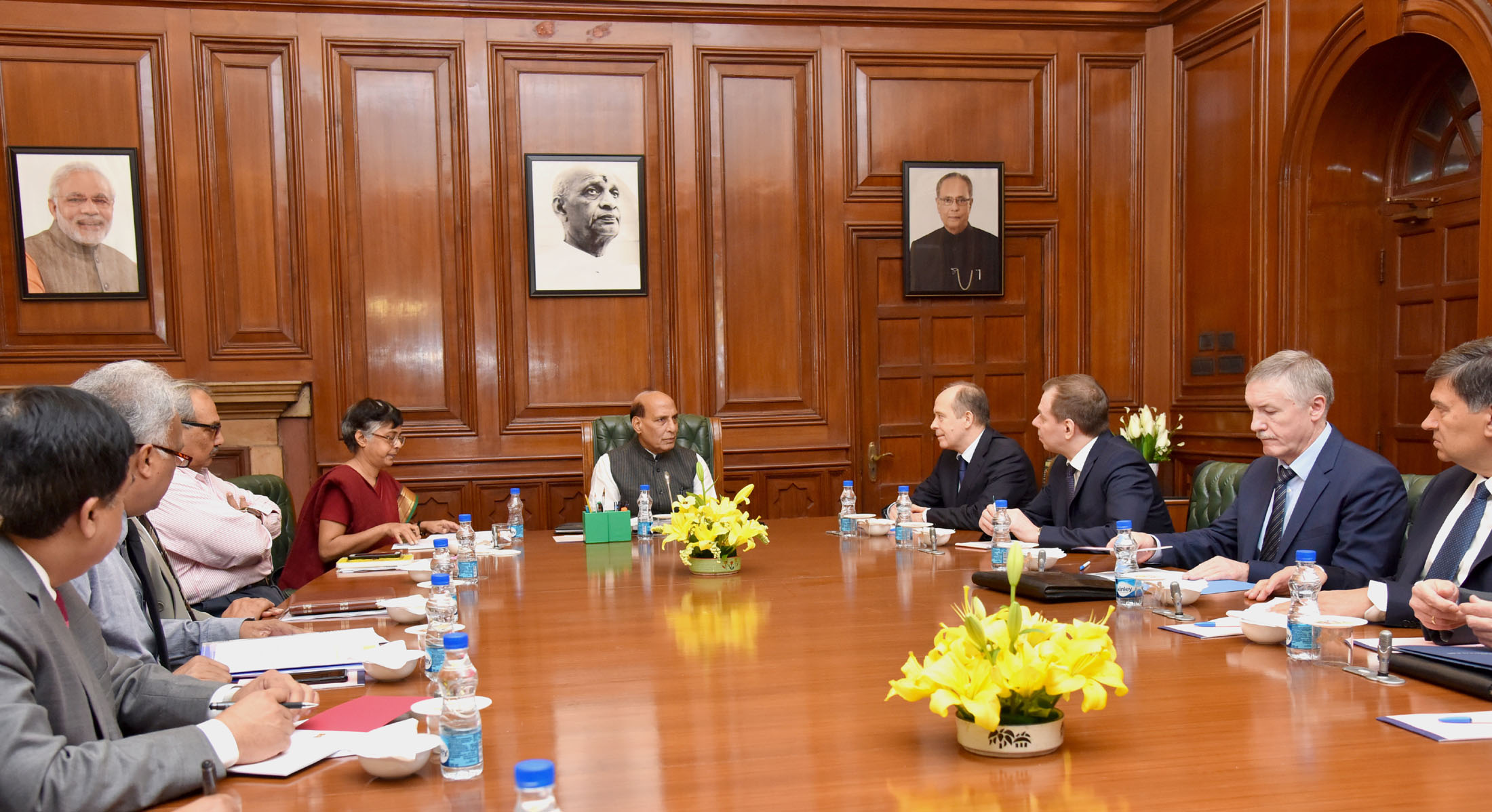
Bortnikov with Indian Interior Minister Rajnath Singh in New Delhi, India on 24 March 2017

In February 2015, at the invitation of the United States, Bortnikov led a Russian delegation to a Washington, D.C. summit on countering violent extremism. His flight to the United States debuted a one-of-a-kind FSB operated Tupolev Tu-214PU airborne command post.

From 27 to 28 January 2018, Bortnikov again visited the United States on a highly unusual trip together with the head of the Foreign Intelligence Service (SVR) Sergey Naryshkin, and the head of military intelligence of the Russian Forces (GRU), Igor Korobov. The three met in Washington with CIA director Mike Pompeo, and according to press releases from the CIA, reportedly discussed the threat posed by Islamic State fighters returning from Syria to Russia and Central Asia following interventions in the Syrian Civil War by a U.S.-led coalition and separately by Russia. Bortnikov called the meetings "very useful."

As chairman of the Russian National Anti-Terrorist Committee and Chairman of the Council of Heads of Security Agencies and Special Services of the Commonwealth of Independent States, Bortnikov has often been tapped as an emissary to former Soviet states during times of heightened tension. On 21 May 2019, he appeared in Dushanbe to meet with leaders of Tajikistan about the increasing presence of Islamic State fighters in neighboring northern Afghanistan. During the 2020 Nagorno-Karabakh War, he was dispatched to both Armenia and Azerbaijan, and led a trilateral meeting headlined by intelligence chiefs from both belligerents. In December 2021, he was sent to Uzbekistan to meet with Uzbek president Shavkat Mirziyoyev.

== Personal life and family ==
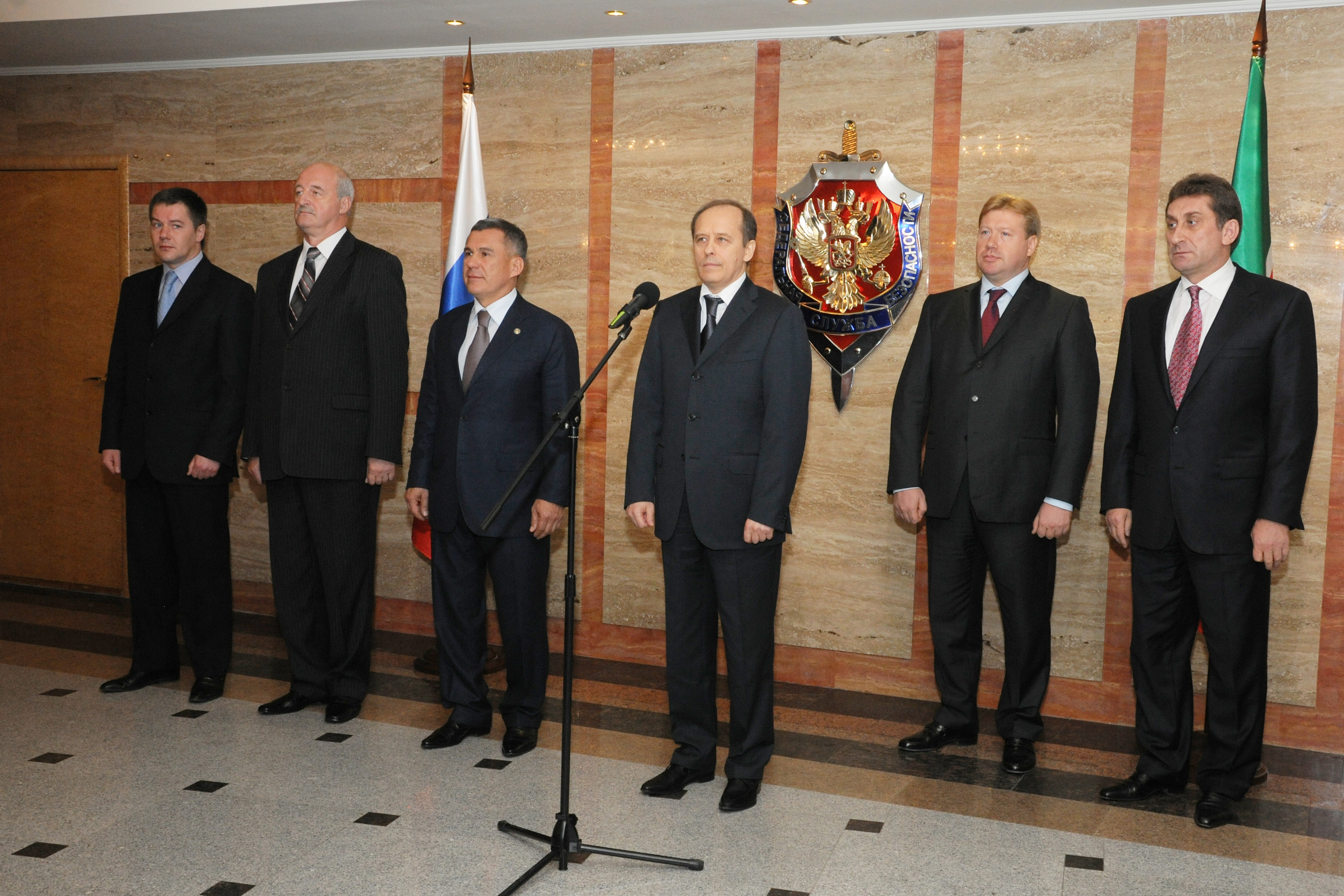
Bortnikov has been described as affectively stiff and uncharismatic.

Bortnikov is married to Tatyana Bortnikova (née Borisovna). Together they have one son, Denis Aleksandrovich Bortnikov (born 19 November 1974), who is deputy director of VTB Bank, the second largest financial institution in Russia. Bortnikov's brother, Mikhail Vasilyevich Bortnikov, born in 1953, is a retired colonel, his sister Olga Vasilievna Bortnikova, born in 1958, is a pensioner.

From November 2004 to May 2008, Bortnikov was a member of the board of directors of Sovcomflot (SCF), Russia's largest shipping company and hydrocarbon transporter.

=== Corruption allegations ===
On 27 July 2015, Novaya Gazeta released an investigative report which claimed Bortnikov, as well as a number of other senior FSB officials, were involved in a land settlement in Moscow's Odintsov district. According to the newspaper, the group arranged the sale of 4.8 hectares (12 acres) of land on the site of a public kindergarten along the Rublyovo-Uspenskoye Highway (along which elite estates including Vladimir Putin's primary residency at Novo-Ogaryovo lie). In exchange for illegally privatizing the public land, each allegedly received around $2.5 million. According to the newspaper, the published investigations are one of the reasons the FSB has offered to shut down public access to Rosreestr's registry of property ownership. Kremlin spokesman Dmitry Peskov said he was unaware of any investigation into wrongdoing.

In 2018, Roskomnadzor shut down the investigative reporting website Russiangate.com hours after the site published a report alleging that Bortnikov owned a secret land plot and luxury house in Sestroretsk, 30 kilometers northwest of Saint Petersburg, worth up to 300 million rubles ($5.3 million), on which he had not been paying taxes.

=== Sanctions ===
Bortnikov was officially sanctioned by the government of the United Kingdom in 2014 in relation to the Russo-Ukrainian War. Trust services sanctions were added in March 2023. He was additionally sanctioned with an asset freeze and travel ban for his responsibility for the preparation and use of chemical weapons (namely a novichok) in the attempted assassination of Alexei Navalny in 2021. His son Denis was sanctioned on 24 February 2022 as director or equivalent at a Russian government-affiliated entity, namely VTB Bank. Trust services sanctions were imposed in March 2023.

On 22 February 2022, in response to Russia recognizing the independence of separatist regions in eastern Ukraine during the prelude to the Russian invasion of Ukraine, the United States imposed sanctions on several Russian individuals, including Bortnikov and his son, Denis.

== Honors and awards ==
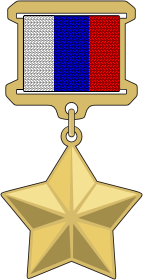
Hero of the Russian Federation

Order of St. George

- Hero of the Russian Federation (awarded by "closed decree" in 2019 or 2020)
- Order of St. George (4th degree)
- Order of Alexander Nevsky
- Order of Merit for the Fatherland, full cavalier of the order (1st, 2nd, 3rd and 4th class awards)
- Order of Military Merit
- Order of Honor
- Order of Friendship
- Honored Officer of the Security Agencies
- Diploma of the Government of the Russian Federation (2006)

== Notes ==
Government offices
Preceded by Sergei Smirnov	Chief of the St. Petersburg and Leningrad Oblast FSB Directorate; June 2003 – March 2004	Succeeded by Yury Ignashchenkov
Preceded by Yury Zaostrovtsev	Head of the Economic Security Service of FSB; 24 February 2004 – 12 May 2008	Succeeded by Yuri V. Yakovlev
Preceded by Nikolay Patrushev	Director of the FSB; 12 May 2008 – present	Incumbent
