= Sergei B. Korolev =

Russian intelligence officer (born 1962)

Sergei Korolev
- Сергей Королёв

First Deputy Director of the Federal Security Service
- Incumbent
- Assumed office 24 February 2021
- President: Vladimir Putin
- Preceded by: Sergei Smirnov

Director of the Economic Security Service of the Federal Security Service
- In office June 2016 – 24 February 2021
- Preceded by: Yuri V. Yakovlev
- Succeeded by: Sergei Alpatov (acting)

Personal details
- Born: 25 July 1962 (age 64) Frunze, Kirghiz SSR, Soviet Union
- Children: 2
- Education: FSB Academy
- Awards: Hero of the Russian Federation
- Nickname(s): "Boltai-Noga" (English: Shakefoot)

Military service
- Allegiance: Soviet Union, Russia
- Service: GRU, FSB
- Rank: General of the Army
- Battles/wars: Second Chechen War; Russo-Georgian War; Syrian Civil War; Russo-Ukrainian War

Sergei Borisovich Korolev (Russian: Сергей Борисович Королёв; born 25 July 1962) is a Russian intelligence officer currently serving as first deputy director of the Federal Security Service (FSB). He previously served as head of the Economic Security Service of the FSB from 2016 to 2021. A secretive figure with extensive connections to the Russian mafia, he is considered one of the leading candidates to succeed Alexander Bortnikov as director of the FSB. He has held the military rank of Army General since 2021. As a result of the Russian invasion of Ukraine, he was sanctioned by the EU, Australia, Belgium, Canada, Estonia, France, New Zealand, Switzerland, the United Kingdom, and Ukraine.

== Early life ==
Korolev was born in Frunze, Kirghiz Soviet Socialist Republic, USSR (now Bishkek, Kyrgyzstan) on 25 July 1962. Born into a military family, very little is known about his early life. Korolev's father was a Soviet military commander and a friend and hunting partner of Viktor Zubkov, former prime minister of Russia and now chairman of the board of Gazprom. He attended the St. Petersburg Higher Military School of Radio Electronics, graduating in 1979.

== Intelligence career ==
=== GRU service (1980's) ===
Korolev first joined the Soviet security services in August 1979, soon after finishing school. Little is known of his service during the Soviet Union. Intelligence Online reports that Korolev served in the GRU, the military intelligence agency of the Soviet Union and Russia, prior to transferring to the FSB.

=== Serdyukov protégé (1990–2000s) ===
Korolev's rise following the collapse of the Soviet Union is closely connected to former Defense Minister Anatoly Serdyukov, son-in-law of his father's friend Viktor Zubkov, though iStories reported that despite his connections, Korolev's career was built primarily on being "a savvy operative." Beginning around 1993, Korolev worked in a private security company that guarded the Mebel-Market chain of furniture stores, where Serdyukov was deputy director.

He joined the third department of the Economic Security Service (SEB) of the Federal Security Service (FSB) for the city of Saint Petersburg and the Leningrad Oblast in 2000, working initially in combating organized crime and supervising law enforcement agencies.

Following questions about his mafia ties in 2004, Korolev was transferred to the Federal Taxation Service, which was also headed by Serdyukov. In 2007, Serdyukov was appointed Minister of Defense, and Korolev followed, becoming his adviser. At the Ministry of Defense, Korolev oversaw the GRU, where some say he was largely left in charge of the military intelligence agency's day-to-day operations. Under Korolev's supervision, the GRU was reformed and the foundation of the Special Operations Forces (SSO) was laid, and in 2009, the Directorate of Special Operations was created in the Special Purpose Center near Senezh, Solnechnogorsk district, Moscow Oblast, on the basis of military unit 92154.

Serdyukov's career faltered when Vladimir Putin fired him in 2012 over a purported corruption scandal that many have described as a cover for Putin relenting to senior military leaders anger over the Serdyukov Reforms, though Korolev escaped the investigation unscathed, transferring back to the FSB.

=== Mafia ties ===
In 2004, Saint Petersburg Police found that Korolev maintained a relationship with Oleg Makovoz, owner of a security firm involved in a series of high-profile contract killings, and a member of the "Brothers' Gang", a criminal enterprise based in Irkutsk sanctioned by the United States in 2017. Korolev’s colleagues claimed Makovoz was a valuable human intelligence source, and that the investigation was trumped up as a byproduct of an ongoing turf war between Korolev and the head of the police department. At the time the relationship emerged, Korolev was working in the FSB’s Economic Security Service. As a result of the Makovoz case, Korolev was transferred to the Federal Taxation Service, led by Anatoly Serdyukov, before both moved to the Ministry of Defense in 2007.

In 2007, then-adviser to Minister of Defense, Korolev was wiretapped by Spanish investigators talking to the leader of the Tambov Gang, Gennady Petrov. The tapes suggested that the criminal ringleader had lobbied Korolev for the appointment of Alexander Bastrykin as head of the Investigative Committee of Russia, and show Korolev promising to attend Petrov's birthday party. In the tapes Korolev is referred to by the nickname Boltay-Noga or Guliay-Noga. The Spanish criminal investigation also implicated Korolev in helping the Tambov Gang secure a promotion for Nikolai Aulov, then the head of the Main Directorate of the Ministry of Internal Affairs (MVD) in the Central Federal District. With Korolev's apparent assistance, Aulov became the deputy director of the Federal Service for the Control of Drug Trafficking in 2008.

In 2019 iStories uncovered testimony by Aslan Gagiev, head of the Aslan Gagiev Gang, a Moscow and North Ossetia based gang accused of at least 80 murders, made to an Austrian court in which Gagiev testified "the head of the ninth service of the FSB took me out of Russia. He gave me 10 thousand dollars and decided that this was the only way he could help me." Several sources confirmed to iStories that Korolev and Gagiev were well acquainted. According to OCCRP, FSB leadership, including Director Alexander Bortnikov, were aware that Gagiev and Korolev knew each other.

=== Return to the FSB (2010s) ===
Following Serdyukov's departure Korolev moved to the FSB in September 2011, appointed head of the Internal Security Directorate (known as the 6th Service or CSS (Russian: «Шестерка»)). Oleg Feoktistov became Serdyukov's deputy. (Note: Oleg Vladimirovich Feoktistov (Russian: Олег Владимирович Феоктистов; born 3 July 1964, Moscow Oblast), also known as "Oleg the Big" or "General Fix" or "General Ficus", served as a border guard in Karelia with Ivan Ivanovich Tkachev (Russian: Иван Иванович Ткачёв; born 1970), who later would head the "K" Directorate of the SEB of the FSB beginning in 2016 after the resignation of Viktor Voronin (Russian: Виктор Воронин), and fought with the Soviet Army during the Soviet–Afghan War where he met the KGB military counterintelligence officer Sergei Shishin, who later became the head of the special forces of the FSB CSS, and then the head of the FSB Economic Support Service. Shishin guided Feoktistov but became embroiled in scandals during 2007 after which Shishin transferred to the Office of seconded employees, then seconded to VTB Bank, and three years later he joined the management of RusHydro and the Igor Sechin associated Rosneft. Feoktistov graduated from the FSB Academy and, in 2004, headed the FSB's Internal Security Directorate also known as the 6th Service or CSS (Russian: «Шестерка») of the FSB, which is responsible for the operational support of criminal cases and The New Times called "Sechin's Special Forces" because it was created on an initiative of Igor Sechin while Igor Sechin was the deputy head of the presidential administration. In September 2016, Feoktistov officially became the head of the security service of Rosneft.)

The Internal Security Directorate led by Korolev is known for many high-profile criminal cases, for example, the Case of the GUEBiPK and General Sugrobov, the case of the St. Petersburg billionaire Dmitry Mikhalchenko, the cases of the governors of the Kirov region Nikita Belykh and the Komi Republic Vyacheslav Gaizer. This department also carried out operational support in the case of the former governor of the Sakhalin Oblast, Alexander Khoroshavin, and the mayor of Vladivostok, Igor Pushkarev.

In 2012, according to other sources, no later than September 2011, Sergey Borisovich Korolev headed the Department of Internal Security of the FSB of Russia, it was under Korolev that the Sixth Service, which was responsible for operational-search activities, became one of the most significant units in the CSS. The CSS, headed by Korolev, was behind many high-profile criminal cases, for example, "The case of the GUEBiPK and General Sugrobov", the case of the St. Petersburg billionaire Dmitry Mikhalchenko, the governors of the Kirov Oblast Nikita Belykh and Komi Vyacheslav Gaizer, operational support in the case of the former governor of the Sakhalin region Alexandr Khoroshavin and the mayor of Vladivostok Igor Pushkarev. Prior to Korolev, the head of the FSB’s own security department was Lieutenant General Alexander Kupryazhkin, who in July 2011, in the midst of the investigation of the Moscow Casino Case, left the FSB FSB and was appointed curator of the FSB Investigation Department in the high position of deputy director FSB. It was predicted that the vacant seat of the head of the CSS FSB would be taken by his deputy Feoktistov, but a year later, Sergei Korolev, a colleague of Anatoly Serdyukov, was put in Kupryazhkin's place, who at one time held the position of Assistant Minister of Defense, who during this period was the acting head of the FSB CSS was not reported, but, according to General Denis Sugrobov, in January 2011, the 1st deputy head of the FSB CSS was Major General O. V. Feoktistov, who retained this position until his dismissal in 2016. It is interesting that, according to the head of the "NAC", Kabanov, during this period, almost nothing was said about the head of the FSB FSB Korolev himself, this "man who, due to the specifics of his service, has a huge amount of information" was able to avoid fame for a long time.

On 8 July 2016, Sergey Borisovich Korolev was promoted to the post of head of the Economic Security Service of the FSB of Russia, and the vacated chair of Korolev in the CSS could be taken by his deputy, acting head of the CSS, General Oleg Feoktistov, who was deservedly predicted for this position for many years, however, at the initiative of Korolev, this again did not happen, because “the post of head of the FSB CSS was taken by his protégé Alexei Komkov”. According to some reports, it was Oleg Feoktistov and his colleague Ivan Tkachev who collected dirt on the team of the former head of the SEB FSB, Yuri Yakovlev, thereby contributed to the appointment of Korolev, however, Korolev continued to be wary of Feoktistov. According to RBC, as a result, "Korolev and Feoktistov had a difficult relationship", which was reflected in the later career of the latter, by the way, retired Oleg Feoktistov, who, for obvious reasons, had a cool attitude towards the head Sergei Korolev, was not unreasonably suspected of manipulation of the situation with the journalist Ivan Golunov, not in favor of the former boss. According to some reports, the "Golunov Case", as a result, somewhat spoiled the reputation of “a rather legendary personality” Sergei Korolev, whose close colleagues were called the defendants in the case of Dorofeev and Medoev, who compromised themselves. Despite the sad ending of General Borys Kolesnikov, the generals of another department: Maksimenko and Nikandrov from the TFR, tried to resist the appointment of Sergei Korolev to the post of head of the SEB, one of the key units in the FSB, which, due to a combination of circumstances that led to a criminal investigation "Shootout on Rochdelskya Street" also ended tragically for them. Aleksey Komkov (Russian: Алексей Комков) who is a protégé of Sergey Korolev replaced Korolev as head of CSS, not General Oleg Feoktistov. (Note: Alexey Komkov (Russian: Алексей Комков) was the head of the FSB Internal Security Directorate from September 2016 after the 8 July 2016 resignation of the former head of the FSB Internal Security Directorate Sergey Borisovich Korolev who was promoted to the post of head of the Economic Security Service of the FSB of Russia, which vacated the chair of Korolev in the CSS. Alexey Komkov headed the FSB Internal Security Directorate until 2018 when he was transferred to the FSB Counterintelligence Service. Komkov is a protégé of Sergey Korolev.)

=== First deputy directorship (2021–present) ===
On 24 February 2021, by decree of the president of Russia, Korolev was appointed First Deputy Director of the FSB. In early June, he was made a General of the Army, the highest active rank in the Russian armed forces.

=== Sanctions ===
He was sanctioned by the UK government in 2022 in relation to the Russo-Ukrainian War.

In July 2022 the European Union imposed sanctions on Korolev in relation to the Russian invasion of Ukraine. He is additionally sanctioned by Australia, Belgium, Canada, Estonia, France, New Zealand, Switzerland, the United Kingdom, and Ukraine. Korolev also appears on the Anti-Corruption Foundation's "List of Bribetakers and Warmongers", which has been used by governments to identify targets for sanctions.

=== Other roles ===
Korolev is a member of the commission on the construction of the Vostochny cosmodrome.

Since 2019, he has been appointed a member of the Supervisory Board of the Kurchatov Institute.

He is currently a member of the Supervisory Board of Rosatom.

In 2021, Korolev was appointed as Russia's representative to the Shanghai Cooperation Organisation's (SCO) Regional Anti-Terrorist Structure (RATS), where he leads Russia's delegation to the counterterrorism and anti-separatism organization.

== Personal life ==
He is married to Marina and has a son, Boris Sergeivich Korolev, who works as a programmer, and a daughter Anastasia. He has a sister, Tatyana Borisovna Koroleva. According to Novaya Gazeta, Korolev is the godfather of FSB Lieutenant Colonel Marat Medoev, a famed sniper and plankowner of Russian SSO, rumored to be his personal deputy. He is personally close to oligarchs Arkady and Boris Rotenberg.
