= Olga Kudeshkina =

Russian judge (born 1951)

- Ольга Кудешкина

Judge of the Moscow City Court
- In office 6 November 2000 – May 2004
- President: Vladimir Putin

Personal details
- Born: 1951 (age 74–75)
- Citizenship: Russia
- Education: Kemerovo State University; Law Faculty; Candidate of Legal Sciences
- Occupation: jurist

Olga Borisovna Kudeshkina (Russian: Ольга Борисовна Кудешкина; born 1951) is a Russian former judge of the first qualification class of the Moscow City Court, Candidate of Legal Sciences. She was deprived of the status of a judge after she made public allegations of political interference in the justice system of Russia.

== Biography ==
Olga Kudeshkina was born in 1951. In 1976 she graduated from the Law Faculty of Kemerovo State University, Soviet Union (USSR). The topic of her dissertation was "Systematization of domestic legislation" (Russian: Систематизация отечественного законодательства). She worked as a people's judge of the city of Kemerovo, and then as a judge of the regional Kemerovo court. From November 6, 2000 to May 2004, she worked as a judge of the Moscow City Court.

== Deprivation of the status of a judge ==
In May 2003, Kudeshkina began to re-examine the criminal case against the senior special investigator of the Investigative Committee of Russia Pavel Zaytsev, (Note: Alternatively: Zaitsev) who was involved in the Three Whales Corruption Scandal. During the trial in the Zaytsev case, the chairman of the Moscow City Court, Olga Yegorova, summoned Kudeshkina several times to her office with the requirement to report on the details on the judicial proceedings. Yegorova advised to Kudeshkina to "follow the desires of the prosecutor", but Kudeshkina refused.

On July 23, 2003, Yegorova withdrew the case from Kudeshkina's proceedings.

In October 2003, Kudeshkina put forward her candidacy in the elections to the State Duma of Russia. On December 1, she gave an interview to the Echo of Moscow radio station about the actions of Olga Yegorova and the pressure on the judge. Kudeshkina also gave an interview to the newspapers Izvestia and Novaya Gazeta.

In May 2004, the qualification board of Moscow on the complaint of Yegorova made a decision to deprive Kudeshkina of the status of a judge.

=== Kudeshkina v. Russia ===
Kudeshkina filed a complaint with the European Court of Human Rights (ECHR). On February 26, 2009, the ECHR recognized that the Russian Federation had violated Article 10 of the European Convention on Human Rights, that provides the right to freedom of expression, and ruled that Kudeshkina demonstrated facts of influence on her by the Moscow City Court and by the prosecutors. The ECHR also awarded her compensation in the amount of 10,000 euros.

Despite the decision of the ECHR, the Moscow City Court on December 18, 2009 refused to review the decisions on Kudeshkina's complaint against the decision to deprive her of the status of a judge, and on March 10, 2010, the Supreme Court of Russia upheld this decision.

== Personal life ==
Kudeshkina is married to a former employee of the KGB of the USSR.
