= Political groups under Vladimir Putin's presidency =

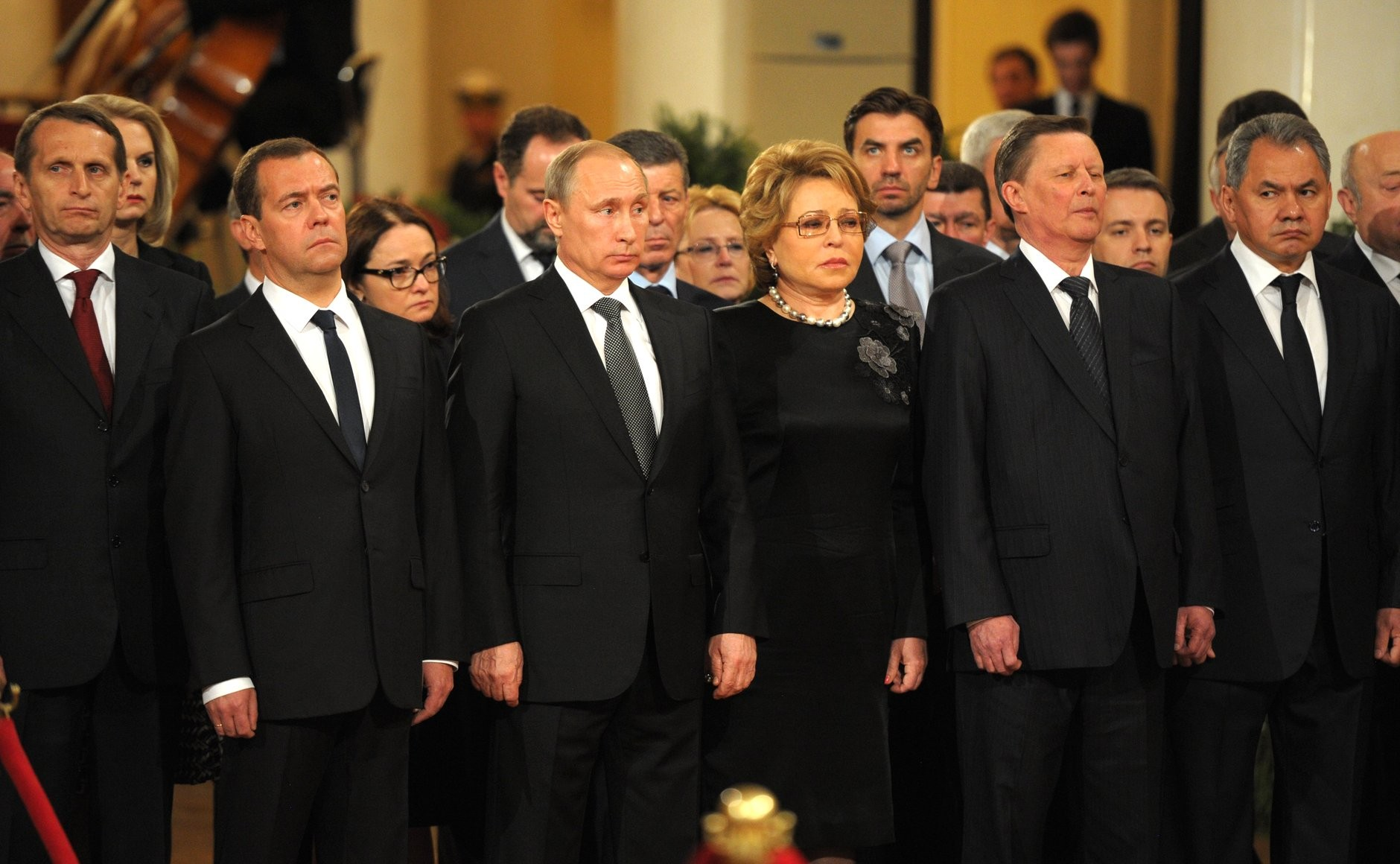
Putin with Sergey Naryshkin, Dmitry Medvedev, Elvira Nabiullina, Dmitry Kozak, Valentina Matviyenko, Sergei Ivanov, and Sergey Shoygu at the funeral of Yevgeny Primakov, 29 June 2015

A diverse variety of informal political groups emerged since the presidency of Vladimir Putin starting in 1999. They include remnants of the Yeltsin family, Saint Petersburg lawyers and economists, and security-intelligence elements called the siloviki.

== Background ==
When Putin came to power in 1999, he had few protégés or long-term associates, and had to balance various competitive elements as he crafted his team. In contrast to the Yeltsin years, Putin's regime was marked by personnel stability, a gradual elevation of trusted associates and coalition-building across competing interests both within the presidential administration and with other political actors.

== Overview ==
As President Vladimir Putin, a former employee of the Leningrad and Leningrad Oblast KGB Directorate and former Chief of the Committee for External Relations of Saint Petersburg Mayor's Office, had come to the presidency in 2000, many political observers noticed quick career promotion of bureaucrats and businesspeople from Saint Petersburg to the federal power bodies (especially the Presidential Executive Office, an institution that has always been totally controlled by the presidential authority) and large state-controlled companies (examples: Gazprom and Rosneft) and their struggle against Moscow elites loyal to Boris Yeltsin's family, known as Family group, as well as against media tycoon Boris Berezovsky and his allies, who helped Putin on his way to power in 1999–2000.

According to Associate Professor of Political Science John P. Willerton, it is difficult to make general judgements about the various informal groups, their backgrounds and political preferences.

== Major groups ==
Major political factions within Putin's Russia, as of 2023. Groups which are no longer relevant are marked with a red outline.

=== St. Petersburg economists and lawyers ===
According to Associate Professor of Political Science John P. Willerton of the University of Arizona in the United States, reformist St. Petersburg economists and lawyers constitute a prominent group in the Putin team. Many of them have career and personal ties to Putin dating back to the early 1990s.

Many of the members of the economic reform team, both in the presidential administration and the government, are drawn from the St Petersburg group. They are academically qualified, have significant administrative experience, and are often focused on the technical complexities of the country's system transformation. They are - in general - committed to market development, privatization and the continued diminution of the state's role in the country's socioeconomic life. The liberal economists contend that the consolidation of democracy comes with improving the population's standard of living and developing the private sector. Prominent St Petersburg economists include Alexei Kudrin, Herman Gref and Putin's economic adviser Andrey Illarionov.

The St Petersburg lawyers focus on constitutional-legal-administrative arrangements to bolster an efficient democratic system, favouring reforms that strengthen simultaneously the market economy and political stability. Prominent members included the former presidential administration head Dmitry Medvedev and Dmitry Kozak.

=== Siloviki ===
Much foreign attention has been given to the security-intelligence elements, what Russians refer to as the siloviki. They began coming to power under Yeltsin, but this accelerated during Putin's premiership and presidency. A common view in Russia is that these siloviki are generally non-ideological, are corrupt, have a pragmatic law and order focus and have Russian national interests at heart. They do not form a cohesive group. Putin himself is a retired Lieutenant Colonel of the KGB.

=== Remnants of the Yeltsin family ===
Another identifiable group are the remnants of the so-called "Family" - a term which originally referred to relatives and associates of the former president Yeltsin. Most senior members of the group have left the highest corridors of power, but some have been able to survive and secure influential positions.

=== Ozero ===
Ozero is the name of a co-operative society headed, inter alia, by Putin. The co-operative administers Putin's substantial personal wealth generated over the course of his presidency. The immense financial power of members of the co-operative fundamentally creates a wealthy clique of new oligarchs capable of replacing the financial power of Yeltsin era oligarchs.

== Outside opinion ==
According to a The Washington Quarterly article written by Ian Bremmer and Samuel Charap in 2006–2007, at the start of his presidency, Vladimir Putin announced that he would consolidate political powers in Russia into the so-called power vertical. However, despite being considered successful by many, this controversial endeavour partially backfired and led to the increasing factionalism within the president's inner circle. Although other institutions became largely irrelevant, disputes and clashes between Kremlin factions, rather than the president's will, became more and more important in determining major policy outcomes, Bremmer and Charap write.

== History ==
During the final years of Boris Yeltsin's presidency, Alexander Voloshin, chief of the Presidential Executive Office, was considered to be the most influential figure within the Family group. Despite his obvious connections to Russian commerce, he was dominating Russia's politics of that time.

In 1999, the Family group, Vladimir Putin, Boris Berezovsky and their allies united their efforts in order to prevent coming to power of the Fatherland-All Russia political alliance of former Prime Minister Yevgeny Primakov and Moscow Mayor Yury Luzhkov that was supported by media tycoon Vladimir Gusinsky and to some extent by the public opinion. The efforts were successful, but as soon as Putin had won the 2000 presidential election, an acute conflict with Boris Berezovsky developed, and in 2002 Berezovsky fled to London. As a result, Russian authorities consolidated their power over Russian television companies NTV and ORT previously controlled by Vladimir Gusinsky and Boris Berezovsky, respectively.

The Family group has also almost entirely lost its influence by 2004 after the dismissals of Alexander Voloshin (October 2003), Prime Minister Mikhail Kasyanov (February 2004) and some key figures of his Cabinet, but some of the group's members secured their political survival. Vladislav Surkov, initially being an aide to Voloshin, gained much influence, as well as Prosecutor-General Vladimir Ustinov, who had leaned towards new Saint Petersburg elites and whose son had become Igor Sechin's son-in-law. Tycoon Roman Abramovich, who had leaned towards the Family group in the 1990s, also remained influential, as well as former Mass Media Minister Mikhail Lesin. Each of them, however, had already distanced away from the Family group by that time.

As the Family group had lost its influence, especially during Vladimir Putin's second four-year presidential term (since 7 May 2004), some conflicts between parts of the new elites of Saint Petersburg origin became evident, as witnessed e.g. by the disputes over the fate of YUKOS, failed project of merging Rosneft and Gazprom, struggle for Sibneft and upcoming 2008 presidential election, some appointments and dismissals in Mikhail Fradkov's Second Cabinet and consequences of the Three Whales Corruption Scandal, but the exact configuration of these new groups still remains unclear. However, it is widely acknowledged that Igor Sechin and Dmitry Medvedev are key figures heading their own factions and opposed to each other but both very close to Putin. Former Prime Minister Mikhail Fradkov is considered a close ally of Sechin.

== See also ==
- Russian oligarchs
