= Three Whales Corruption Scandal =

Russian corruption scandal

The Three Whales Corruption Scandal is a major corruption scandal in Russia involving several furniture companies and federal government bodies, which has unfolded since 2000.

== 2000 smuggling investigation ==
Three Whales (Tri kita/Три кита) is a Moscow furniture shopping complex owned by Sergei Zuev. On August 13, 2000, Russian Customs inspectors suspended it and seized a furniture consignment supplied by the companies Bastion and Liga Mars, as they had allegedly smuggled 400 tons of furniture into Russia, while Zuev had evaded $5 million of customs duty by falsifying the price and weight of the imported goods. On October 20, 2000, Captain Pavel Zaitsev filed a criminal case against Liga Mars, initiated on September 7 by the Moscow Oblast Directorate of Internal Affairs.

The customs inspectors found that the Three Whales shop was controlled by Yevgeny Zaostrovtsev, a former chief of now FSB Director Nikolai Patrushev and the father of FSB General Yury Zaostrovtsev, who at that time was the Head of the Economic Security Department and a Deputy Director of FSB.

== Prosecutor General's Office reaction ==
In November 2000, the Prosecutor General's Office under Vladimir Ustinov halted the investigation and confiscated files related to the case. In December 2000 it charged Captain Pavel Zaitsev with abuse of office and claimed that he had conducted 12 searches without a prosecutor sanction and had illegally detained two suspects. On September 5, 2002, the Moscow City Court found Zaitsev not guilty on the charges. Later the Supreme Court of the Russian Federation canceled this decision, and on November 3, 2003 Pavel Zaitsev was sentenced by a Moscow court to two years of probation. Olga Kudeshkina, a judge who took part in the trial, said on December 1, 2003 that she was pressured to convict him, but refused to do so. In 2004, Kudeshkina lost her job.

On May 7, 2001, First Deputy Prosecutor General Yury Biryukov signed a directive stopping the smuggling investigation, citing a lack of evidence.

In Autumn 2001, the Prosecutor General's Office also accused Chief of the Customs Investigation Directorate Marat Fayzulin and Chief of the Customs Inspection Alexander Volkov with abuse of office and extortion of money from Sergei Zuev and an associate. On June 4, 2003, Fayzulin and Volkov were acquitted by a Moscow court.

On October 15, 2001, at a press conference, the State Customs Committee claimed that it had discovered a smuggling network organized by Sergei Zuev. Customs officially charged him with customs duty evasion.

This situation as a whole was widely considered an episode of the struggle between Boris Yeltsin's "Family", represented by the State Customs Committee chairman Mikhail Vanin, a close ally of Alexander Voloshin and Roman Abramovich, and security services personnel, known as siloviki. Vanin apparently lost the battle, as he left his position during the government reshuffle initiated in March 2004 by Vladimir Putin, when the Customs Committee was incorporated into the Economy Ministry of Russia.

== Parliamentary commission ==
Two deputies of the State Duma and members of the State Duma Security Committee, Yury Shchekochikhin, a journalist, and Alexander Gurov, Lieutenant General of Interior Affairs, launched a parliamentary inquiry into the case which was approved by the State Duma on March 13, 2002. The Prosecutor General's Office rejected all the accusations of corruption, claiming that the investigation had been closed for legitimate reasons. In April 2002 Shchekochikhin, Gurov, and Nikolay Kovalyov, another State Duma deputy and a former FSB head, asked Vladimir Putin to intervene. Eventually the inquiry forced the Prosecutor General's Office to resume investigation of the smuggling. A prosecutor from Leningrad Oblast, Vladimir Loskutov, was chosen by President Vladimir Putin personally to lead the investigation of the affair.

Earlier that year, on February 18, 2002, Shchekochikhin had published a detailed article in Novaya Gazeta on the smuggling affair and corruption in the Interior Ministry and the Prosecutor General's Office. Immediately after this he received a death threat. On June 2, 2003, he published another article in that newspaper in which he accused the Prosecutor General's Office and Biryukov personally of corruption:

== Possible victims ==
Several individuals involved in investigating the Three Whales case have suffered threats and assaults or died under suspicious circumstances.

Mr. Vorobiov, Head of Central Operative Customs, who initiated Criminal Case 27400-22/2000 after finding out about the fictitious Liga Mars company, was assaulted in February 2002.

A logistics manager for the Grand and Three Whales stores, Mr. Polyakov, was attacked two weeks later.

One day later, an investigator for the Russian Customs Committee, captain Yuhimenko, received a head trauma. On the same day, the car of Moscow region's Interior Ministry investigator, Ms. Nenahova, was bombed. Ms. Nenahova worked on Case 12707 against Liga Mars employees. Investigator Pavel Zaitsev and his family received numerous threats throughout the year.

On May 27, 2003, Mikhail Pereverzev, the president of the Furniture Importers Association and a key witness in the affair, was shot dead in a hospital.

On July 3, 2003, Yury Shchekochikhin died a few days after he had been hospitalized, according to Russian officials, from a suddenly developed allergy of unknown origin. His relatives were denied an official medical report about the cause of his illness, and were forbidden from taking specimens of his tissue to conduct an independent medical investigation. The possibility that he was poisoned has been widely considered. Shchekochikhin's colleague in the Duma, Aleksandr Gurov, was never asked to witness, according to Novaya Gazeta's chief editor Dmitry Muratov.

Also in 2003, Andrey Saenko, another key witness, was severely injured in an assassination attempt.

Customs investigators Mikhail Vanin and Colonel General Boris Gutin lost their jobs in 2004.

== 2006 arrests and government bodies reshuffle ==
The dismissal in May 2006 of Alexander Zherikhov, head of the Federal Custom Service, as well as some other FSB, Interior Ministry and Prosecutor General's Office officials, is linked by many to the Three Whales scandal. On June 2, 2006, Prosecutor General of Russia Vladimir Ustinov, who had been in the office since 1999, resigned and became Justice Minister of Russia later that month. A major corruption scandal has unfolded unexpectedly and almost out of public sight. On June 14 Prosecutor General's Office under acting Prosecutor General Yury Chaika reported that it had reopened the furniture contraband investigation going back to 2000 and arrested Sergey Zuev, owner of the Three Whales and Grand furniture retail centers, Andrey Latushkin, Director General of the parent company Alliance-96, Andrey Saenko and two smugglers, Pavel Podsotsky and his wife Irina Podsotskaya, Moscow representatives of a Latvian firm, were arrested for smuggling and custom duty evasion. Later Yekaterina Leladze, Anatoly Melnichuk, founder of Liga Mars, Valery Belyakov and Pavel Polyakov (by default) were also charged. The businesspeople were charged with grand smuggling by an organized group, exceptionally grand custom duty evasion and grand legalization of smuggled goods by an organized group (art.188 part 4, art. 194 part 2, art. 174 part 3 of the Russian Criminal Code).

On June 15, in Shanghai, President Vladimir Putin told journalists that he had asked Vladimir Loskutov, a prosecutor from Leningrad Oblast and a former classmate of his, to take on the case, as the President couldn't trust the Moscow offices of law-enforcement agencies.

On July 7 First deputy Prosecutor General Yury Buiryukov resigned. On September 13, 2006, the Prosecutor General's Office under Yury Chaika announced that it had attained the dismissals of 19 unnamed high-rank state employees involved in the furniture smuggling cases as well as illegal imports of consumer goods from China, although unlike employees of furniture companies, no official has ever been charged with this. Mass media revealed that the officials dismissed around that time had worked in the Moscow and federal offices of FSB, Prosecutor General's Office, Moscow Regional Prosecutor's Office, Federal Customs Service and Presidential Executive Office. Deputy heads of the FSB Internal Security Department also figured in the report authored by Viktor Cherkesov. The purge has occurred while FSB head Nikolai Patrushev was on vacations. Vladimir Vdovin, Deputy Chairman of the Russian Federal Property Fund, has also resigned after 12 years in office on September 19, 2006, officially because of a change of job, but it was rumored that his dismissal was linked to the Three Whales case.
