= List of teams and cyclists in the 2018 Volta a Portugal =

The 2018 Volta a Portugal is the 80th edition of the Volta a Portugal cycle race and is held on 1 August to 12 August 2018. The race starts in Setúbal and finishes in Fafe.

== Teams ==
The 21 teams invited to the race were:

UCI Professional Continental teams

- WB Aqua Protect Veranclassic
- Israel Cycling Academy
- Euskadi–Murias
- Caja Rural–Seguros RGA

UCI Continental teams

- W52 / FC Porto
- Team Sapura Cycling
- Team Ecuador
- Team Coop
- Differdange–Losch
- Sporting / Tavira
- Aviludo–Louletano
- Amore & Vita–Prodir
- Efapel
- Vito–Feirense–BlackJack
- Rádio Popular–Boavista
- MsTina–Focus
- Miranda–Mortágua
- Liberty Seguros–Carglass
- LA Alumínios

== Cyclists ==
Legend
No.	Starting number worn by the rider during the Volta
Pos.	Position in the general classification
Time	Deficit to the winner of the general classification
†	Denotes riders born on or after 1 January 1995 eligible for the Young rider classification in the Volta a Portugal
General classification	Denotes the winner of the General classification in the Volta a Portugal
Points classification	Denotes the winner of the Points classification in the Volta a Portugal
Mountains classification	Denotes the winner of the Mountains classification in the Volta a Portugal
Young rider classification	Denotes the winner of the Young rider classification in the Volta a Portugal (eligibility indicated by †)
DNS	Denotes a rider who did not start a stage, followed by the stage before which he withdrew
DNF	Denotes a rider who did not finish a stage, followed by the stage in which he withdrew
DSQ	Denotes a rider who was disqualified from the race, followed by the stage in which this occurred
HD	Denotes a rider finished outside the time limit, followed by the stage in which they did so
Age correct as of Wednesday 1 August 2018, the date on which the Volta began

=== By starting number ===
No.	Name	Nationality	Team	Age	Pos.	Time	Ref.
1	Raúl Alarcón	Spain	W52 / FC Porto	32	1	41h 15' 32"	
2	Ricardo Mestre	Portugal	W52 / FC Porto	34	8	+ 6' 35"	
3	César Fonte	Portugal	W52 / FC Porto	31	42	+ 45' 36"	
4	António Carvalho	Portugal	W52 / FC Porto	28	35	+ 39' 34"	
5	Rui Vinhas	Portugal	W52 / FC Porto	31	85	+ 1h 44' 14"	
6	João Rodrigues	Portugal	W52 / FC Porto	23	7	+ 5' 27"	
7	Gustavo César Veloso	Spain	W52 / FC Porto	28	39	+ 42' 32"	
11	Eliot Lietaer	Belgium	WB Aqua Protect Veranclassic	27	DNS-7	–	
12	Julien Stassen	Belgium	WB Aqua Protect Veranclassic	29	91	+ 1h 54' 31"	
13	Franklin Six †	Belgium	WB Aqua Protect Veranclassic	21	107	+ 2h 56' 10"	
14	Ludovic Robeet	Belgium	WB Aqua Protect Veranclassic	24	HD-10	–	
15	Antoine Warnier	Belgium	WB Aqua Protect Veranclassic	25	DNF-4	–	
16	Christophe Masson	France	WB Aqua Protect Veranclassic	32	34	+ 38' 59"	
17	Thomas Deruette †	Belgium	WB Aqua Protect Veranclassic	23	74	+ 1h 36' 24"	
21	Awet Gebremedhin	Sweden	Israel Cycling Academy	26	27	+ 28' 00"	
22	José Manuel Díaz †	Spain	Israel Cycling Academy	23	53	+ 1h 04' 14"	
23	Omer Goldstein †	Israel	Israel Cycling Academy	21	82	+ 1h 41' 34"	
24	Nathan Earle	Australia	Israel Cycling Academy	30	15	+ 9' 04"	
25	Matteo Badilatti	Switzerland	Israel Cycling Academy	26	DNS-7	–	
26	Guy Niv	Israel	Israel Cycling Academy	24	57	+ 1h 11' 24"	
27	Ben Perry	Canada	Israel Cycling Academy	24	88	+ 1h 46' 36"	
31	Muhamad Zawawi Azman	Malaysia	Team Sapura Cycling	23	89	+ 1h 49' 48"	
32	Akmal Hakim Zakaria †	Malaysia	Team Sapura Cycling	21	96	+ 2h 02' 39"	
33	Jesse Ewart	Australia	Team Sapura Cycling	24	55	+ 1h 09' 11"	
34	Mario Vogt	Germany	Team Sapura Cycling	26	76	+ 1h 37' 57"	
35	Muhsin Al Redha Misbah †	Malaysia	Team Sapura Cycling	21	81	+ 1h 40' 35"	
36	Víctor Niño	Colombia	Team Sapura Cycling	45	59	+ 1h 12' 17"	
37	Jahir Perez	Colombia	Team Sapura Cycling	31	64	+ 1h 19' 12"	
41	Fernando Barceló †	Spain	Euskadi–Murias	22	40	+ 43' 37"	
42	Aitor González	Spain	Euskadi–Murias	27	93	+ 1h 57' 33"	
43	Óscar Rodríguez †	Spain	Euskadi–Murias	23	20	+ 12' 19"	
44	Sergio Samitier †	Spain	Euskadi–Murias	22	62	+ 1h 15' 20"	
45	Enrique Sanz	Spain	Euskadi–Murias	28	87	+ 1h 45' 48"	
46	Beñat Txoperena	Spain	Euskadi–Murias	26	46	+ 57' 35"	
47	Gotzon Udondo	Spain	Euskadi–Murias	24	101	+ 2h 18' 16"	
51	Byron Guamá	Ecuador	Team Ecuador	33	73	+ 1h 36' 14"	
52	Anderson Timoteo Paredes †	Venezuela	Team Ecuador	23	102	+ 2h 19' 32"	
53	Cristian David Pita †	Ecuador	Team Ecuador	23	DNF-3	–	
55	Santiago Montenegro †	Ecuador	Team Ecuador	20	DNF-3	–	
56	Alexis Benjamin Quinteros †	Ecuador	Team Ecuador	20	104	+ 2h 29' 07"	
57	Wilson Haro †	Ecuador	Team Ecuador	20	33	+ 31' 53"	
61	Joaquim Silva	Portugal	Caja Rural–Seguros RGA	26	DNF-1	–	
62	Josu Zabala	Spain	Caja Rural–Seguros RGA	25	69	+ 1h 29' 06"	
63	Cristián Rodríguez †	Spain	Caja Rural–Seguros RGA	23	38	+ 42' 00"	
64	Rafael Reis	Portugal	Caja Rural–Seguros RGA	26	70	+ 1h 32' 49"	
65	Antonio Molina	Spain	Caja Rural–Seguros RGA	27	67	+ 1h 27' 33"	
66	Jon Irisarri †	Spain	Caja Rural–Seguros RGA	22	66	+ 1h 24' 56"	
67	Danilo Celano	Italy	Caja Rural–Seguros RGA	26	51	+ 1h 03' 16"	
71	Hakon Aalrust †	Norway	Team Coop	20	DNS-6	–	
72	Louis Bendixen †	Denmark	Team Coop	23	DNS-2	–	
73	Anton Tunset †	Norway	Team Coop	20	DNF-5	–	
74	Krister Hagen	Norway	Team Coop	29	18	+ 10' 33"	
75	Øivind Lukkedahl	Norway	Team Coop	24	47	+ 58' 47"	
76	Trond Trondsen	Norway	Team Coop	24	DNF-9	–	
77	Fredrik Ludvigsson	Sweden	Team Coop	24	45	+ 54' 36"	
81	Olivier Pardini	Belgium	Differdange–Losch	33	DNS-6	–	
82	Ivan Centrone †	Luxembourg	Differdange–Losch	22	DNF-5	–	
83	Samuel Mobberley †	New Zealand	Differdange–Losch	22	100	+ 2h 09' 18"	
84	Maxim Rusnac	Moldova	Differdange–Losch	25	68	+ 1h 28' 07"	
85	Josh Teasdale	Great Britain	Differdange–Losch	24	25	+ 23' 30"	
86	Larry Valvasori †	Luxembourg	Differdange–Losch	22	44	+ 48' 08"	
87	Laurin Winter †	Germany	Differdange–Losch	21	95	+ 1h 59' 44"	
91	Joni Brandão	Portugal	Sporting / Tavira	28	2	+ 1' 03"	
92	Alejandro Marque	Spain	Sporting / Tavira	36	13	+ 8' 13"	
93	Alvaro Trueba	Spain	Sporting / Tavira	25	92	+ 1h 56' 33"	
94	Mario González	Spain	Sporting / Tavira	26	DNF-3	–	
95	Frederico Figueiredo	Portugal	Sporting / Tavira	27	5	+ 4' 09"	
96	Alexander Grigoryev	Russia	Sporting / Tavira	26	79	+ 1h 39' 43"	
97	Rinaldo Nocentini	Italy	Sporting / Tavira	40	36	+ 40' 42"	
101	Vicente García de Mateos	Spain	Aviludo–Louletano	29	3	+ 1' 14"	
102	Luís Mendonça	Portugal	Aviludo–Louletano	32	23	+ 18' 02"	
103	Óscar Hernández	Spain	Aviludo–Louletano	25	52	+ 1h 03' 37"	
104	Luís Fernandes	Portugal	Aviludo–Louletano	30	11	+ 7' 31"	
105	David de la Fuente	Spain	Aviludo–Louletano	37	80	+ 1h 40' 20"	
106	Márcio Barbosa	Portugal	Aviludo–Louletano	32	37	+ 41' 35"	
107	Rui Rodrigues	Portugal	Aviludo–Louletano	26	43	+ 47' 44"	
111	Pierpaolo Ficara	Italy	Amore & Vita–Prodir	27	49	+ 1h 02' 34"	
112	Kristian Javier Yustre	Colombia	Amore & Vita–Prodir	24	DNF-5	–	
113	Mirko Trosino	Italy	Amore & Vita–Prodir	25	84	+ 1h 42' 04"	
114	Viesturs Luksevics	Latvia	Amore & Vita–Prodir	31	77	+ 1h 38' 22"	
115	Iltjan Nika †	Albania	Amore & Vita–Prodir	23	DNF-5	–	
116	Maris Bogdanovics	Latvia	Amore & Vita–Prodir	26	DNF-3	–	
117	Colin Stüssi	Switzerland	Amore & Vita–Prodir	25	DNF-9	–	
121	Sérgio Paulinho	Portugal	Efapel	38	17	+ 10' 00"	
122	Daniel Mestre	Portugal	Efapel	32	29	+ 29' 06"	
123	Rafael Silva	Portugal	Efapel	27	31	+ 31' 19"	
124	Henrique Casimiro	Portugal	Efapel	32	10	+ 6' 49"	
125	Marcos Jurado	Spain	Efapel	27	99	+ 2h 09' 06"	
126	Bruno Silva †	Portugal	Efapel	30	19	+ 11' 31"	
127	Jesús del Pino	Spain	Efapel	27	22	+ 16' 18"	
131	Edgar Pinto	Portugal	Vito–Feirense–BlackJack	32	4	+ 2' 20"	
132	Hugo Sancho	Portugal	Vito–Feirense–BlackJack	36	32	+ 31' 28"	
133	Luís Afonso	Portugal	Vito–Feirense–BlackJack	28	21	+ 13' 42"	
134	Ricardo Vale	Portugal	Vito–Feirense–BlackJack	25	86	+ 1h 45' 05"	
135	João Matias	Portugal	Vito–Feirense–BlackJack	27	63	+ 1h 19' 09"	
136	Soufiane Haddi	Morocco	Vito–Feirense–BlackJack	27	71	+ 1h 34' 29"	
137	Xuban Errazkin †	Spain	Vito–Feirense–BlackJack	21	16	+ 9' 53"	
141	Domingos Gonçalves	Portugal	Rádio Popular–Boavista	29	9	+ 6' 36"	
142	Daniel Silva	Portugal	Rádio Popular–Boavista	33	12	+ 7' 58"	
143	David Rodrigues	Portugal	Rádio Popular–Boavista	27	14	+ 8' 43"	
144	Luís Gomes	Portugal	Rádio Popular–Boavista	24	26	+ 25' 27"	
145	Óscar Pelegrí	Spain	Rádio Popular–Boavista	32	75	+ 1h 37' 11"	
146	Filipe Cardoso	Portugal	Rádio Popular–Boavista	34	54	+ 1h 04' 20"	
147	João Benta	Portugal	Rádio Popular–Boavista	31	6	+ 4' 19"	
151	Emil Dima †	Romania	MsTina–Focus	21	108	+ 3h 04' 36"	
152	Mattia Marcelli	Italy	MsTina–Focus	27	105	+ 2h 51' 30"	
154	Andrea Ruscetta †	Italy	MsTina–Focus	28	103	+ 2h 20' 44"	
155	Raul-Antonio Sinza †	Romania	MsTina–Focus	19	106	+ 2h 53' 25"	
156	Riccardo Stacchiotti	Italy	MsTina–Focus	26	97	+ 2h 06' 02"	
157	Federico Zurlo	Italy	MsTina–Focus	24	58	+ 1h 11' 26"	
161	António Barbio	Portugal	Miranda–Mortágua	31	DNF-3	–	
162	Nuno Meireles	Portugal	Miranda–Mortágua	26	78	+ 1h 38' 56"	
163	Hugo Nunes †	Portugal	Miranda–Mortágua	21	41	+ 44' 09"	
164	Jorge Magalhães †	Portugal	Miranda–Mortágua	21	90	+ 1h 51' 30"	
165	Francisco Campos †	Portugal	Miranda–Mortágua	20	98	+ 2h 06' 38"	
166	Gonçalo Carvalho †	Portugal	Miranda–Mortágua	20	24	+ 20' 38"	
167	Pedro Teixeira †	Portugal	Miranda–Mortágua	19	DNF-3	–	
171	André Carvalho †	Portugal	Liberty Seguros–Carglass	20	30	+ 29' 10"	
172	César Martingil †	Portugal	Liberty Seguros–Carglass	23	DNF-4	–	
173	Gaspar Gonçalves †	Portugal	Liberty Seguros–Carglass	23	60	+ 1h 12' 32"	
174	Rafael Lourenço †	Portugal	Liberty Seguros–Carglass	20	83	+ 1h 41' 34"	
175	Venceslau Fernandes †	Portugal	Liberty Seguros–Carglass	22	48	+ 1h 01' 50"	
176	Carlos Cobos Marquez †	Spain	Liberty Seguros–Carglass	23	50	+ 1h 03' 11"	
177	Samuel Blanco	Spain	Liberty Seguros–Carglass	24	DNF-7	–	
181	Nuno Almeida	Portugal	LA Alumínios	26	28	+ 28' 05"	
182	Gonçalo Leaça †	Portugal	LA Alumínios	20	65	+ 1h 19' 55"	
183	David Ribeiro †	Portugal	LA Alumínios	22	72	+ 1h 34' 36"	
184	Fábio Oliveira	Portugal	LA Alumínios	23	94	+ 1h 57' 41"	
185	Paulo Silva †	Portugal	LA Alumínios	23	DNF-9	–	
186	Patrick Videira	Portugal	LA Alumínios	23	61	+ 1h 15' 17"	
187	João Fernandes †	Portugal	LA Alumínios	23	56	+ 1h 09' 43"	

=== By team ===
W52 / FC Porto (W52)
No.	Rider	Pos.
1	Raúl Alarcón (ESP)	1
2	Ricardo Mestre (POR)	8
3	César Fonte (POR)	42
4	António Carvalho (POR)	35
5	Rui Vinhas (POR)	85
6	João Rodrigues (POR)	7
7	Gustavo César Veloso (ESP)	39

WB Aqua Protect Veranclassic (WVA)
No.	Rider	Pos.
11	Eliot Lietaer (BEL)	DNS-7
12	Julien Stassen (BEL)	91
13	Franklin Six (BEL)	107
14	Ludovic Robeet (BEL)	HD-10
15	Antoine Warnier (BEL)	DNF-4
16	Christophe Masson (FRA)	34
17	Thomas Deruette (BEL)	74

Israel Cycling Academy (ICA)
No.	Rider	Pos.
21	Awet Gebremedhin (SWE)	27
22	José Manuel Díaz (ESP)	53
23	Omer Goldstein (ISR)	82
24	Nathan Earle (AUS)	15
25	Matteo Badilatti (SUI)	DNS-7
26	Guy Niv (ISR)	57
27	Ben Perry (CAN)	88

Team Sapura Cycling (TSC)
No.	Rider	Pos.
31	Muhamad Zawawi Azman (MAS)	89
32	Akmal Hakim Zakaria (MAS)	96
33	Jesse Ewart (AUS)	55
34	Mario Vogt (GER)	76
35	Mushin Al Redha Misbah (MAS)	81
36	Víctor Niño (COL)	59
37	Jahir Perez (COL)	64

Euskadi–Murias (EUS)
No.	Rider	Pos.
41	Fernando Barceló (ESP)	40
42	Aitor González (ESP)	93
43	Óscar Rodríguez (ESP)	20
44	Sergio Samitier (ESP)	62
45	Enrique Sanz (ESP)	87
46	Beñat Txoperena (ESP)	46
47	Gotzon Udondo (ESP)	101

Team Ecuador (ECU)
No.	Rider	Pos.
51	Byron Guamá (ECU)	73
52	Anderson Timoteo Paredes (VEN)	102
53	Cristian David Pita (ECU)	DNF-3
55	Santiago Montenegro (ECU)	DNF-3
56	Alexis Benjamin Quintero (ECU)	104
57	Wilson Haro (ECU)	33

Caja Rural–Seguros RGA (CJR)
No.	Rider	Pos.
61	Joaquim Silva (POR)	DNF-1
62	Josu Zabala (ESP)	69
63	Cristián Rodríguez (ESP)	38
64	Rafael Reis (POR)	70
65	Antonio Molina (ESP)	67
66	Jon Irisarri (ESP)	66
67	Danilo Celano (ITA)	51

Team Coop (TCO)
No.	Rider	Pos.
71	Hakon Aalrust (NOR)	DNS-6
72	Louis Bendixen (DEN)	DNS-2
73	Anton Tunset (NOR)	DNF-5
74	Krister Hagen (NOR)	18
75	Øivind Lukkedahl (NOR)	47
76	Trond Trondsen (NOR)	DNF-9
77	Fredrik Ludvigsson (SWE)	45

Differdange–Losch (CCD)
No.	Rider	Pos.
81	Olivier Pardini (BEL)	DNS-6
82	Ivan Centrone (LUX)	DNF-5
83	Samuel Mobberley (NZL)	100
84	Maxim Rusnac (MDA)	68
85	Josh Teasdale (GBR)	25
86	Larry Valvasori (LUX)	44
87	Laurin Winter (GER)	95

Sporting / Tavira (STA)
No.	Rider	Pos.
91	Joni Brandão (POR)	2
92	Alejandro Marque (ESP)	13
93	Alvaro Trueba (ESP)	92
94	Mario González (ESP)	DNF-3
95	Frederico Figueiredo (POR)	5
96	Alexander Grigoryev (RUS)	79
97	Rinaldo Nocentini (ITA)	36

Aviludo–Louletano (ALU)
No.	Rider	Pos.
101	Vicente García de Mateos (ESP)	3
102	Luís Mendonça (POR)	23
103	Óscar Hernández (ESP)	52
104	Luís Fernandes (POR)	11
105	David de la Fuente (ESP)	80
106	Márcio Barbosa (POR)	37
107	Rui Rodrigues (POR)	43

Amore & Vita–Prodir (AMO)
No.	Rider	Pos.
111	Pierpaolo Ficara (ITA)	49
112	Kristian Yustre (COL)	DNF-5
113	Mirko Trosino (ITA)	84
114	Viesturs Luksevics (LAT)	77
115	Iltjan Nika (ALB)	DNF-5
116	Maris Bogdanovics (LAT)	DNF-3
117	Colin Stüssi (SUI)	DNF-9

Efapel (EFP)
No.	Rider	Pos.
121	Sérgio Paulinho (POR)	17
122	Daniel Mestre (POR)	29
123	Rafael Silva (POR)	31
124	Henrique Casimiro (POR)	10
125	Marcos Jurado (ESP)	99
126	Bruno Silva (POR)	19
127	Jesús del Pino (ESP)	22

Vito–Feirense–BlackJack (VFB)
No.	Rider	Pos.
131	Edgar Pinto (POR)	4
132	Hugo Sancho (POR)	32
133	Luís Afonso (POR)	21
134	Ricardo Vale (POR)	86
135	João Matias (POR)	63
136	Soufiane Haddi (MAR)	71
137	Xuban Errazkin (ESP)	16

Rádio Popular–Boavista (RPB)
No.	Rider	Pos.
141	Domingos Gonçalves (POR)	9
142	Daniel Silva (POR)	12
143	David Rodrigues (POR)	14
144	Luís Gomes (POR)	26
145	Óscar Pelegrí (ESP)	75
146	Filipe Cardoso (POR)	54
147	João Benta (POR)	6

MsTina–Focus (MST)
No.	Rider	Pos.
151	Emil Dima (ROU)	108
152	Mattia Marcelli (ITA)	105
154	Andrea Ruscetta (ITA)	103
155	Raul-Antonio Sinza (ROU)	106
156	Riccardo Stacchiotti (ITA)	97
157	Federico Zurlo (ITA)	58

Miranda–Mortágua (MIR)
No.	Rider	Pos.
161	António Barbio (POR)	DNF-3
162	Nuno Meireles (POR)	78
163	Hugo Nunes (POR)	41
164	Jorge Magalhães (POR)	90
165	Francisco Campos (POR)	98
166	Gonçalo Carvalho (POR)	24
167	Pedro Teixeira (POR)	DNF-3

Liberty Seguros–Carglass (LSC)
No.	Rider	Pos.
171	André Carvalho (POR)	30
172	César Martingil (POR)	DNF-4
173	Gaspar Gonçalves (POR)	60
174	Rafael Lourenço (POR)	83
175	Venceslau Fernandes (POR)	48
176	Carlos Cobos Marquez (ESP)	50
177	Samuel Blanco (POR)	DNF-7

LA Alumínios (LAA)
No.	Rider	Pos.
181	Nuno Almeida (POR)	28
182	Gonçalo Leaça (POR)	65
183	David Ribeiro (POR)	72
184	Fábio Oliveira (POR)	94
185	Paulo Silva (POR)	DNF-9
186	Patrick Videira (POR)	61
187	João Fernandes (POR)	56

=== By nationality ===
The 131 riders that are competing in the 2018 Volta a Portugal originated from 26 different countries.

Country	No. of riders	Finishers	Stage wins
Albania	1	0	
Australia	2	2	
Belgium	7	3	
Canada	1	1	
Colombia	3	2	
Denmark	1	0	
Ecuador	5	3	
France	1	1	
Germany	2	2	
Great Britain	1	1	
Israel	2	2	
Italy	8	8	2 (Riccardo Stacchiotti x2)
Latvia	2	1	
Luxembourg	2	1	
Malaysia	3	3	
Moldova	1	1	
Morocco	1	1	
New Zealand	1	1	
Norway	5	2	
Portugal	48	43	2 (Rafael Reis, Domingos Gonçalves)
Romania	2	2	
Russia	1	1	
Spain	26	24	7 (Vicente García de Mateos x3, Raúl Alarcón x3, Enrique Sanz)
Sweden	2	2	
Switzerland	2	0	
Venezuela	1	1	
Total	131	108	11
