= Gotzon =

Gotzon is a Basque masculine given name that may refer to the following people:

Given name

- Gotzon Garate Goihartzun (1934–2008), Spanish writer and linguist
- Gotzon Mantuliz (born 1988), Spanish designer and model
- Gotzon Martín (born 1996), Spanish cyclist
- Gotzon Udondo (born 1993), Spanish cyclist

Surname

- Jenn Gotzon (born 1979), American actress, model, speaker and author
