= Sergei Smirnov (intelligence officer) =

Russian security services official

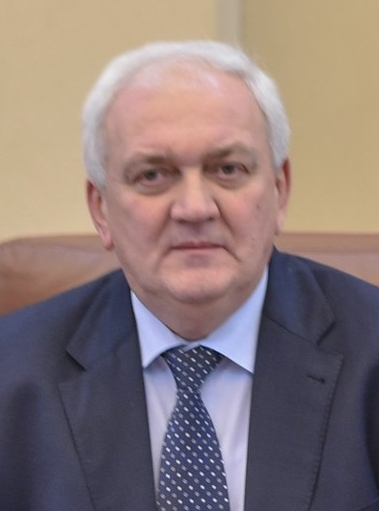
- Smirnov around 2018

First Deputy Director of the Federal Security Service
- In office July 2003 – October 2020
- President: Vladimir Putin; Dmitri Medvedev
- Succeeded by: Sergei Korolev

Personal details
- Born: Sergei Mikhailovich Smirnov; October 12, 1950 (age 75) Chita, Zabaykalsky Krai, RSFSR, Soviet Union
- Education: M.A. Bonch-Bruevich Leningrad Electroengineering Institute of Communications (B.S.)

Military service
- Allegiance: Russia
- Branch/service: KGB, FSK, FSB
- Years of service: 1975–2020
- Rank: General of the Army

Sergei Mikhailovich Smirnov (Russian: Серге́й Миха́йлович Смирно́в, born October 12, 1950) is a retired Russian intelligence officer whose career ended with a seventeen-year stint as First Deputy Director of the Federal Security Service (FSB). He was made a General of the Army in 2006.

== Early life and education ==
Born in Chita in 1950, his family moved to Leningrad in 1952. He later attended school alongside Nikolai Patrushev and Boris Gryzlov at the school No. 211. Together with Gryzlov he graduated from M.A. Bonch-Bruevich Leningrad Electroengineering Institute of Communications in 1973.

He completed the Higher Courses of the KGB under the Council of Ministers of the USSR in Minsk in 1975.

== Intelligence career ==
In 1975, he joined the KGB and the early part of his career was spent in the Leningrad region KGB and then FSB.

While not a personal friend of Vladimir Putin, he was a member of the Leningrad security clique. When Putin was made director of the FSB in 1998, Patrushev became his deputy and Smirnov moved to Moscow. He quickly acquired one of the key positions within the agency: head of the Internal Security Directorate (UVB), the watchdogs’ watchdog.

In 1999, he became the Chief of the Internal Security Directorate of FSB.

From January 5, 2001, to June 2003, he was the Chief of the Saint Petersburg and Leningrad Oblast FSB Directorate.

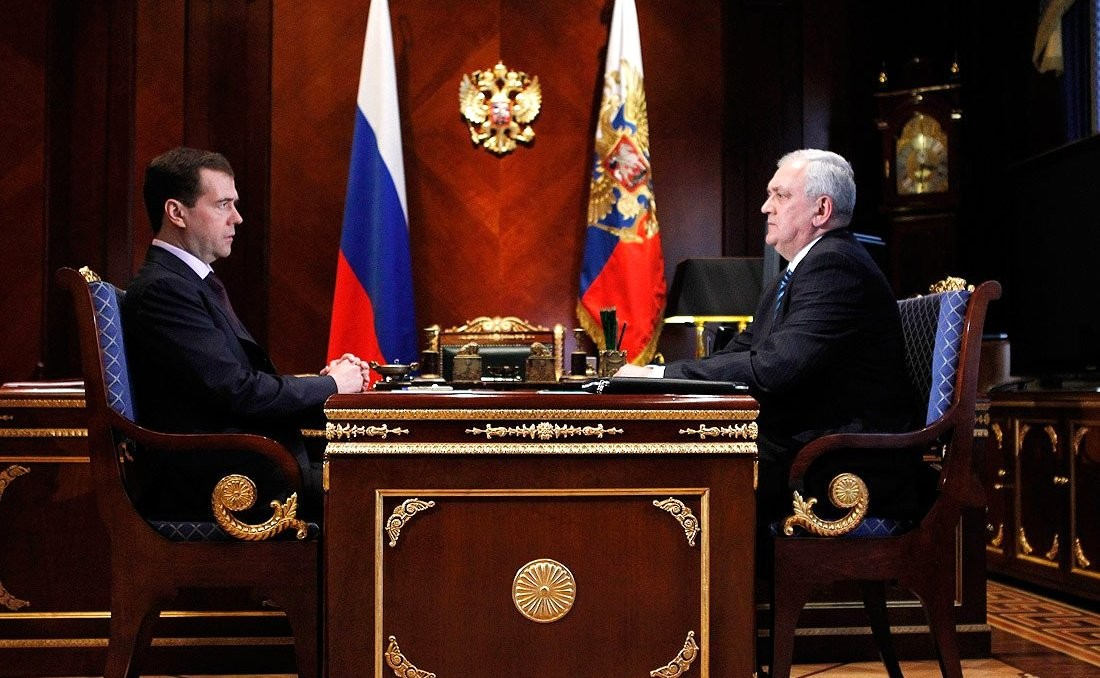
Smirnov meeting with Dmitry Medvedev in 2011.

In July 2003, he became First Deputy Director of the FSB, retaining his position after a major reorganization of it in July 2004.

On December 20, 2006, he was made a General of the Army by presidential decree.

== Personal life ==
Smirnov was reported to have had a stroke several years prior to his retirement.

== Retirement ==
In October 2020, Smirnov retired quietly in an apparent dismissal by Vladimir Putin. It was no surprise that he was going to retire, as he had reached the age of 70 and was already in ill-health, but it was a surprise that he departed office with such a lack of fanfare and no comfortable sinecures. He was, after all, a powerful and influential figure within the Russian security community.

== Honors and awards ==
- Master of Sports of the Soviet Union in handball.
- Order of Military Merit
- Order of Friendship
- Order of Honor

Political offices
Preceded by Viktor Ivanov	Chief of the Internal Security Directorate of FSB; 1999 - ??	Succeeded by Sergei Shishin
Preceded by Alexander Grigoryev	Chief of the FSB Directorate of Saint Petersburg and Leningrad Oblast; January 5, 2001 - June 2003	Succeeded by Alexander Bortnikov
