= Philippe Wagner–Bazin =

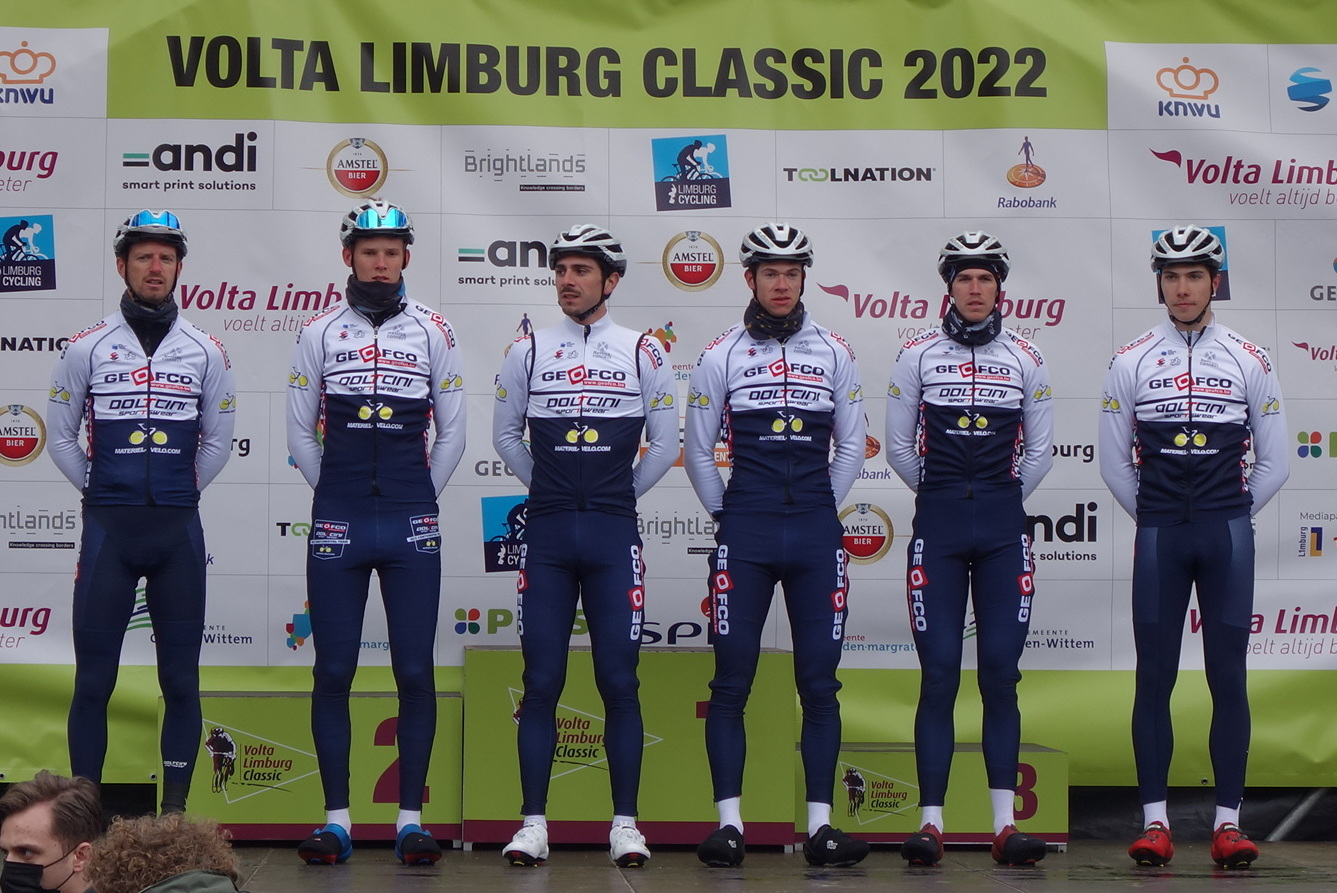
- The team in 2022

Team information
- UCI code: PWB
- Registered: Belgium
- Founded: 2022
- Disbanded: 2024
- Discipline: Road
- Status: UCI Continental

Key personnel
- General manager: Geoffrey Coupé
- Team managers: Christophe Masson; Pascal Pieterarens

Team name history
- 2022 2023 2024: Geofco–Doltcini Matériel-vélo.com; Matériel-vélo.com; Philippe Wagner/Bazin
Philippe Wagner–Bazin jersey
Jersey

Philippe Wagner–Bazin was a Belgian UCI Continental cycling team established in 2022. The team merged with Belgian UCI ProTeam Bingoal WB before the 2025 season.

== Final team roster ==
As of 31 December 2024.

Rider	Date of birth
Pierre Barbier (FRA)	25 September 1997 (age 28)
Rudy Barbier (FRA)	18 December 1992 (age 33)
Sean Bero (BEL)	24 July 1998 (age 28)
Quentin Bezza (FRA)	24 March 1998 (age 28)
Alan Boileau (FRA)	25 June 1999 (age 27)
Theo Bonnet (BEL)	18 September 2001 (age 24)
Thomas Devaux (FRA)	29 January 1997 (age 29)
Enrico Dhaeye (BEL)	2 February 2001 (age 25)

Rider	Date of birth
Alexis Guérin (FRA)	6 June 1992 (age 34)
Alexandre Kess (LUX)	8 August 2003 (age 23)
Gwen Leclainche (FRA)	12 April 2000 (age 26)
Stefano Museeuw (BEL)	1 June 1997 (age 29)
Kasper Saver (BEL)	26 November 2000 (age 25)
Tristan Scherpenbergh (BEL)	14 April 1999 (age 27)
Jens Vandenbogaerde (BEL)	6 January 1992 (age 34)
Mathias Vanoverberghe (BEL)	5 February 1998 (age 28)

== Major wins ==
2022
Stage 10 Tour de Guadeloupe, Ivan Centrone
2023
Stage 3 Tour de Guadeloupe, Alexandre Kess
2024
Stages 2 & 5 Tour of Sharjah, Pierre Barbier
Stage 2 Tour de Bretagne, Alexis Guérin
Overall Ronde de l'Oise, Pierre Barbier

Stages 3 & 4, Pierre Barbier

Stages 1 & 5 Tour de Guadeloupe, Quentin Bezza
