= Beñat Txoperena =

Spanish cyclist

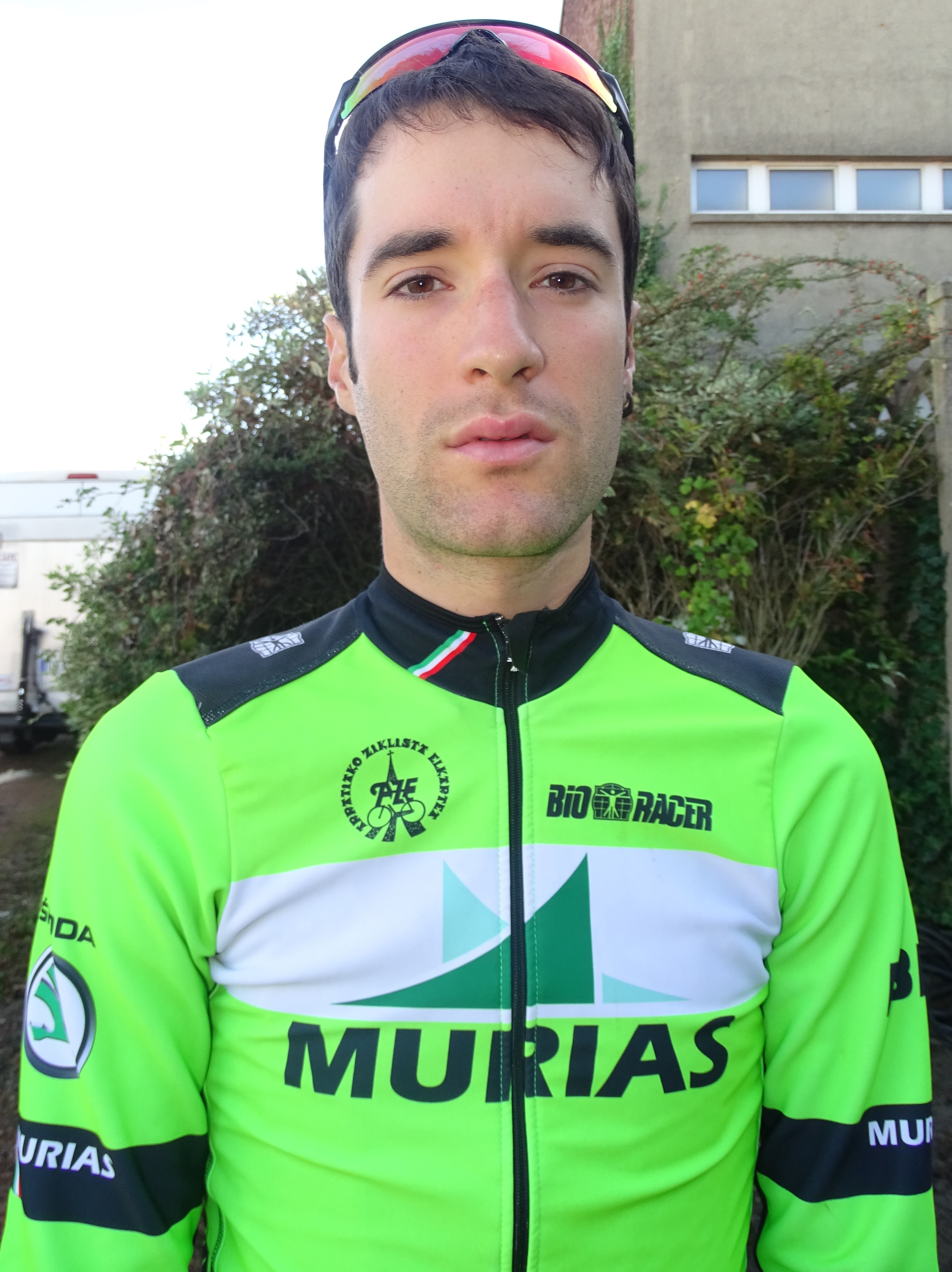
- Txoperena in 2015.

Personal information
- Full name: Beñat Txoperena Matxikote
- Born: 18 July 1991 (age 35) Igantzi, Spain
- Height: 180 cm (5 ft 11 in)
- Weight: 67 kg (148 lb)

Cycling career
- Sport: Cycling
- Current team: Retired
- Discipline: Road
- Role: Rider

Amateur teams
- 2010–2011: Caja Rural amateur
- 2012: Bidelan–Kirolgi
- 2013: Gipuzkoa–Eki Sport

Professional teams
- 2014: Euskadi
- 2015–2018: Murias Taldea

Beñat Txoperena Matxikote (born 18 July 1991 in Igantzi) is a Spanish former cyclist, who rode professionally between 2014 and 2018 for the Euskadi and Euskadi–Murias teams.

== Major results ==
2013
2nd Road race, National Under-23 Road Championships
2014
8th Overall Tour des Pays de Savoie
2015
7th Overall GP Internacional do Guadiana
2017
3rd Overall Volta Internacional Cova da Beira
