= Alexander Grigoryev =

Russian KGB officer (1949–2008)

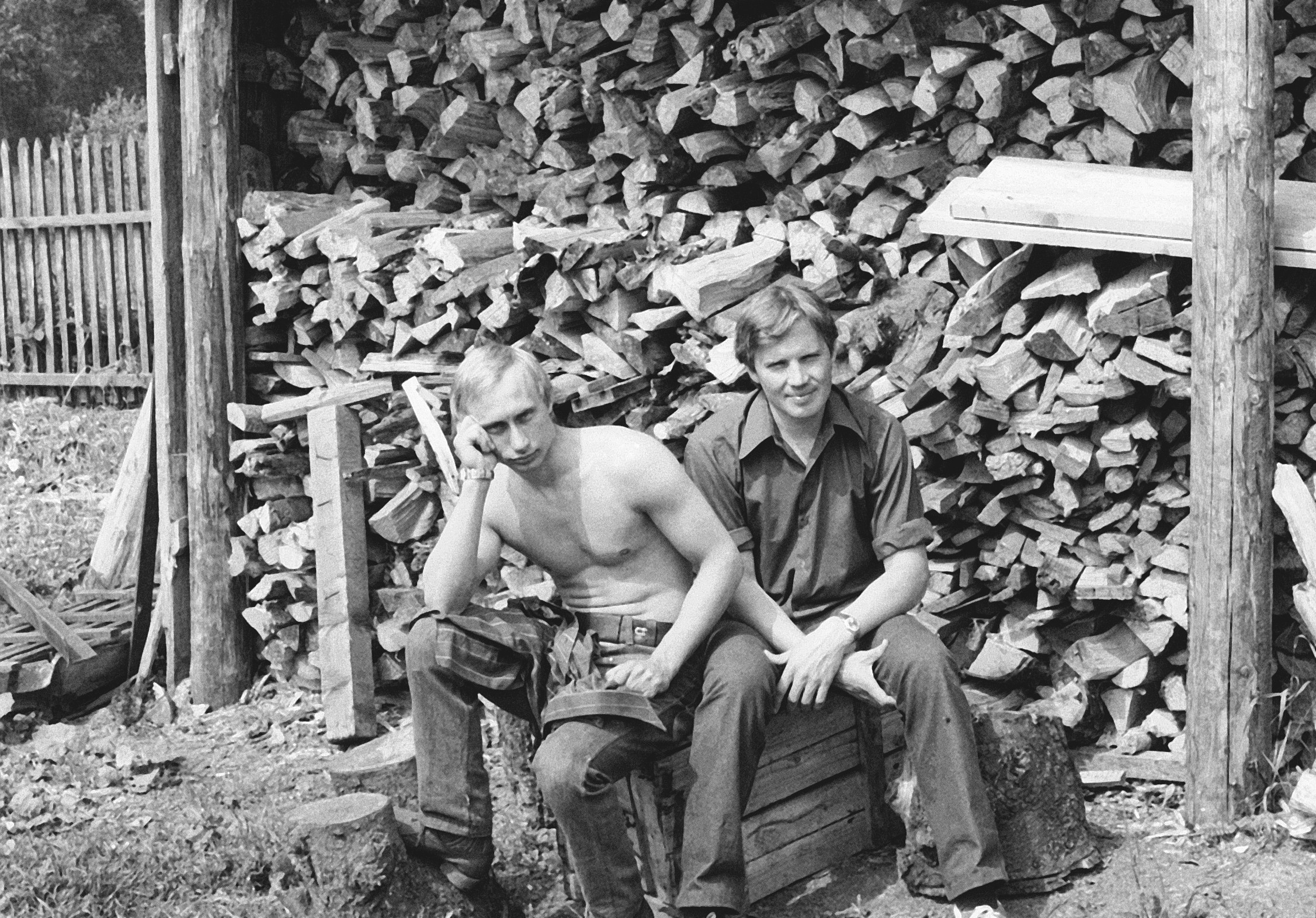
Vladimir Putin and Alexander Grigoryev

Alexander Andreyevich Grigoryev (in Russian: Александр Андреевич Григорьев, October 4, 1949 – December 10, 2008) was a Russian security services official.

Grigoryev was born in Leningrad.

In 1975–2001 he served in the KGB and its successors. As a KGB officer he also took part in Soviet–Afghan War. From August 28 till October 1, 1998, he led the Economic Security Department of FSB. From October 1, 1998, till January 5, 2001, he was the Chief of the FSB Directorate of Saint Petersburg and Leningrad Oblast and deputy director of FSB. In January–July 2001 he was an adviser to FSB Director Nikolai Patrushev. Since July 19, 2001, he has been the Director General of the State Reserves Agency (Gosrezerv).

He had the federal state civilian service rank of 1st class Active State Councillor of the Russian Federation.

Political offices
Preceded by N/A	Chief of the Economic Security Department of FSB; August 28 – October 1, 1998	Succeeded by Nikolay Patrushev
Preceded by Viktor Cherkesov	Chief of the FSB Directorate of Saint Petersburg and Leningrad Oblast; October 1, 1998 – January 5, 2001	Succeeded by Sergei Smirnov
Preceded by Igor Yusufov	Director General of the State Reserves Agency (Gosrezerv); July 19, 2001 – December 10, 2008	Succeeded by Boris Evstratikov
