= Gotzon Garate Goihartzun =

Basque and Spanish writer and linguist

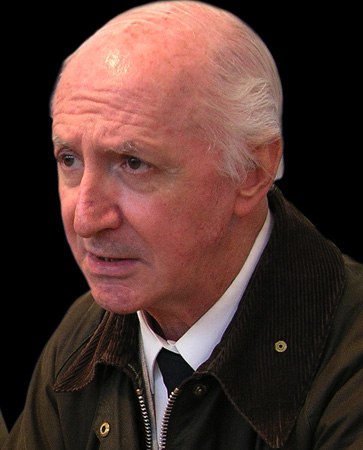
- Goihartzun in 2002
- Born: 1 September 1934; Elgoibar, Basque Country, Spain
- Died: 1 October 2008 (aged 74); Bilbao, Basque Country, Spain
- Occupations: Writer, linguist

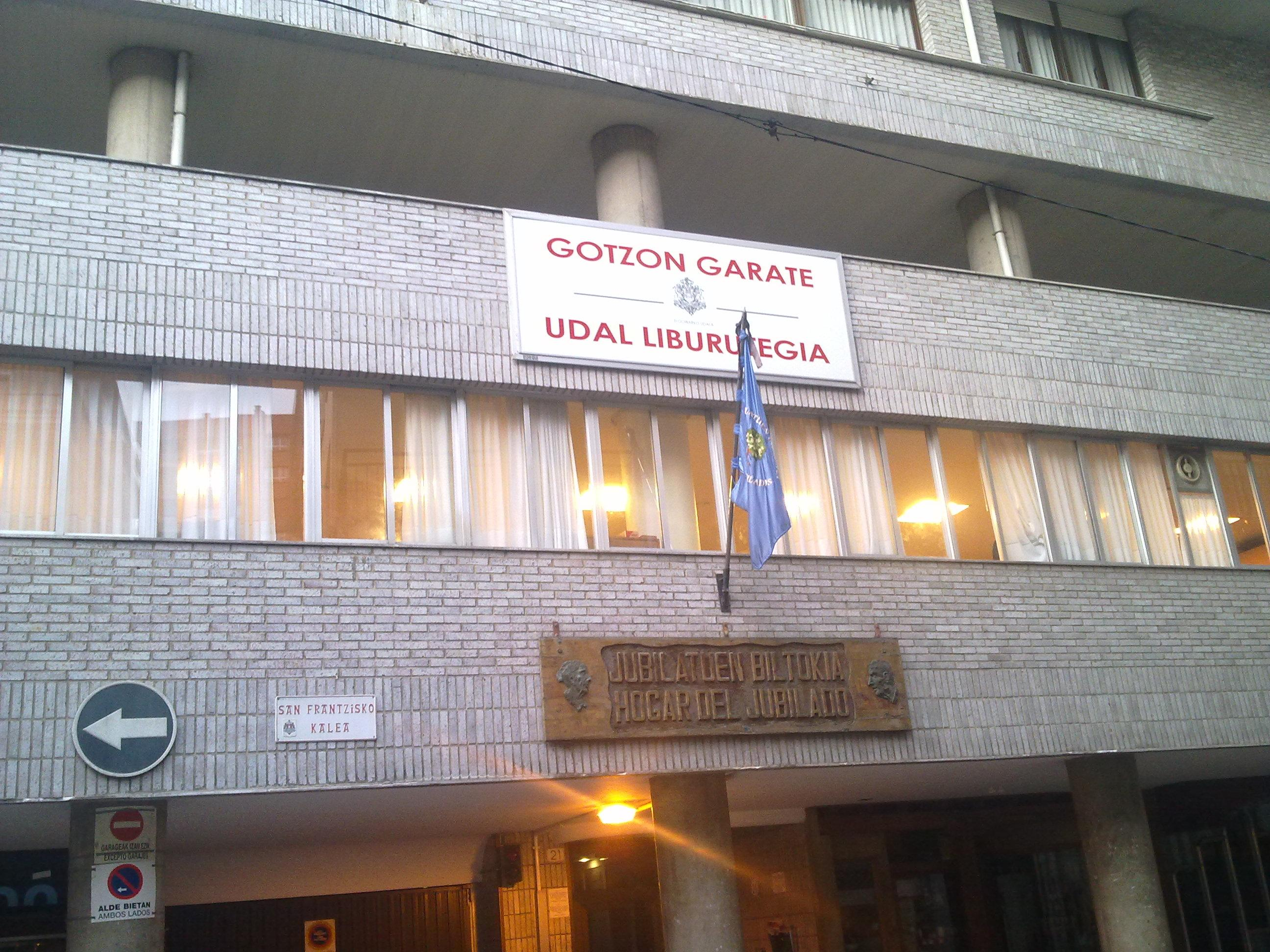
Gotzon Garate Library, in Elgoibar

Gotzon Garate Goihartzun (1 September 1934 – 1 October 2008) was a Basque and Spanish writer and linguist, collector of Basque dialects, Jesuit theologian.

He made a significant contribution to Basque philology, sequentially from the Castilian tongue scraping borrowing. He was a polyglot, possessed by most of the Romance languages, English, German, Hindi, and a number of other, often while traveling to a country where the language was spoken, for the purpose of its study.

== Works ==
=== Narration ===
- Aldarte oneko ipuinak (1982, Gero)
- Nafarroako Ezkurran (1981, Gero)
- Lehortean (1979)
- Muskilak (1980, Mensajero)

=== Novel ===
- Zilarrezko gazteluaren kronika urratua (1992, Gero)
- Alaba (1984, Elkar)
- Hadesen erresumarantz (1983, Elkar)
- Izurri berria (1981)
- Goizuetako ezkongabeak (1979, Zugaza)
- Elizondoko eskutitzak (1977, Gero)
- Esku leuna (1977, CAP)

=== Essay ===
- Euskal eleberrien kondaira (2001, Gero)
- Atzerriko eta Euskal Herriko polizia eleberria (2000, Elkar)
- Euskal atsotitzak (1995, Gero)
- Marxen marxismoa (1971, Mensajero)
- Euskal elaberrien kondaira – 2 (1985, Mensajero)
- Leninen marxismoa (1983, Mensajero)
- Marxen ondoko errebisionismoa, Rosa Luxemburg (1974, Mensajero)
- Lenin eta nazioen autodeterminazioa (1980, Mensajero)
- Marx eta nazioa (1972, Mensajero)
- Euskal elaberrien kondaira – 3 (1991, Mensajero)

=== Chronicle ===
- Zakurra, zeure laguna (2002, Elkar)
- India harrigarria (2001, Elkar)
- New York City (1988, Elkar)
- New Yorkeko kronika beltza eta beste kontu periferiko batzuk (2004, Elkar)

=== Diccionarios ===
- Erdarakadak (1988, Gero)

=== Collectibles ===
- Lauaxeta menderik mende (2005, Mendebalde Kultur Alkartea)
