= Franklin Six =

Belgian cyclist (born 1996)

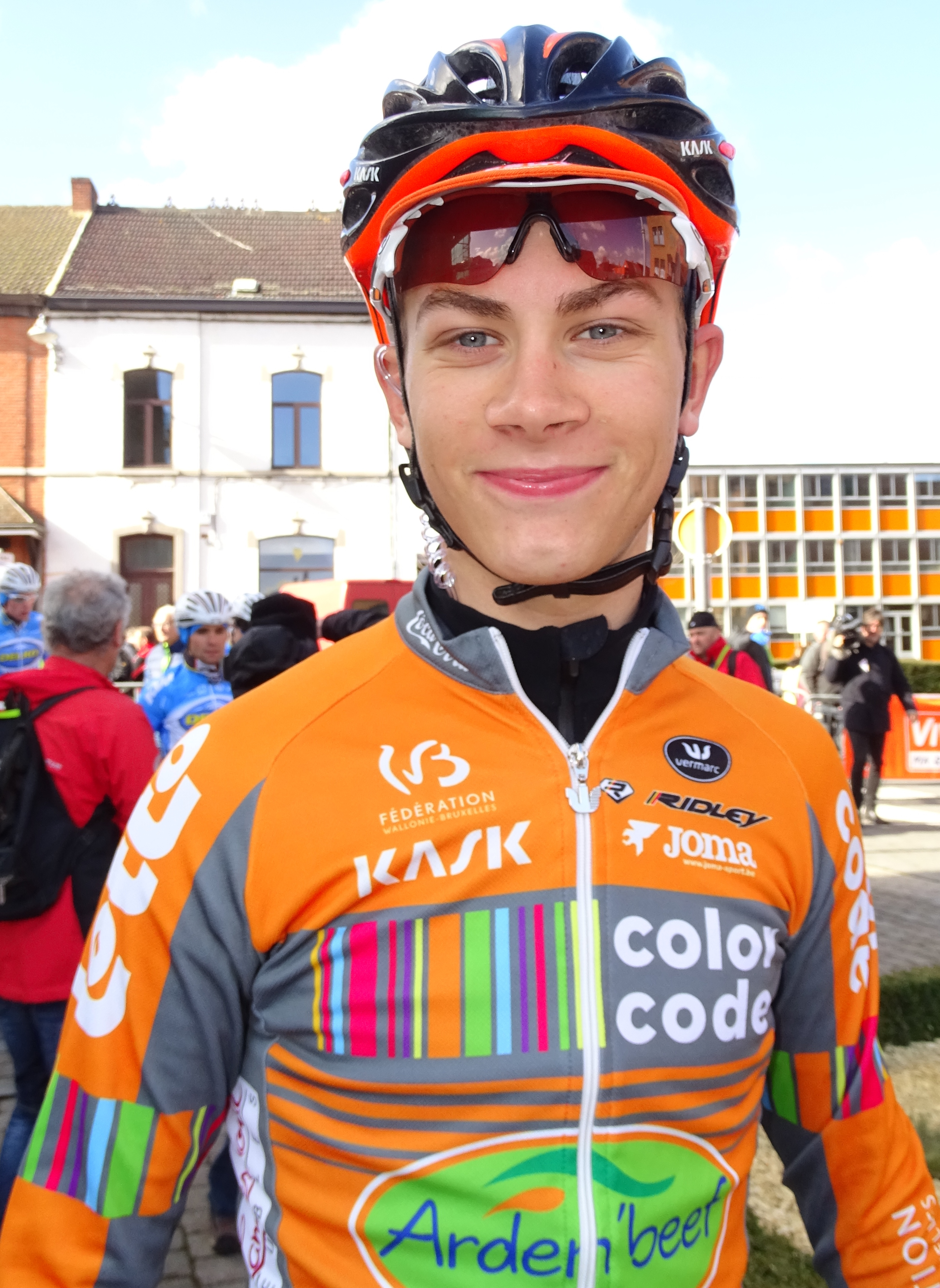
- Six in 2016.

Personal information
- Full name: Franklin Six
- Born: 29 December 1996 (age 29) Ploegsteert, Belgium

Cycling career
- Sport: Cycling
- Current team: Retired
- Discipline: Road
- Role: Rider

Professional teams
- 2015–2017: Color Code–Aquality Protect
- 2018–2020: WB Aqua Protect Veranclassic

Franklin Six (born 29 December 1996 in Ploegsteert) is a Belgian former professional cyclist, who rode professionally between 2015 and 2020, for the AGO–Aqua Service and Bingoal–Wallonie Bruxelles teams.

== Major results ==
2016
8th Rund um den Finanzplatz Eschborn-Frankfurt U23
2017
2nd Road race, National Under-23 Road Championships
5th Liège–Bastogne–Liège U23
2019
10th Paris–Chauny
