= Christophe Masson =

French cyclist

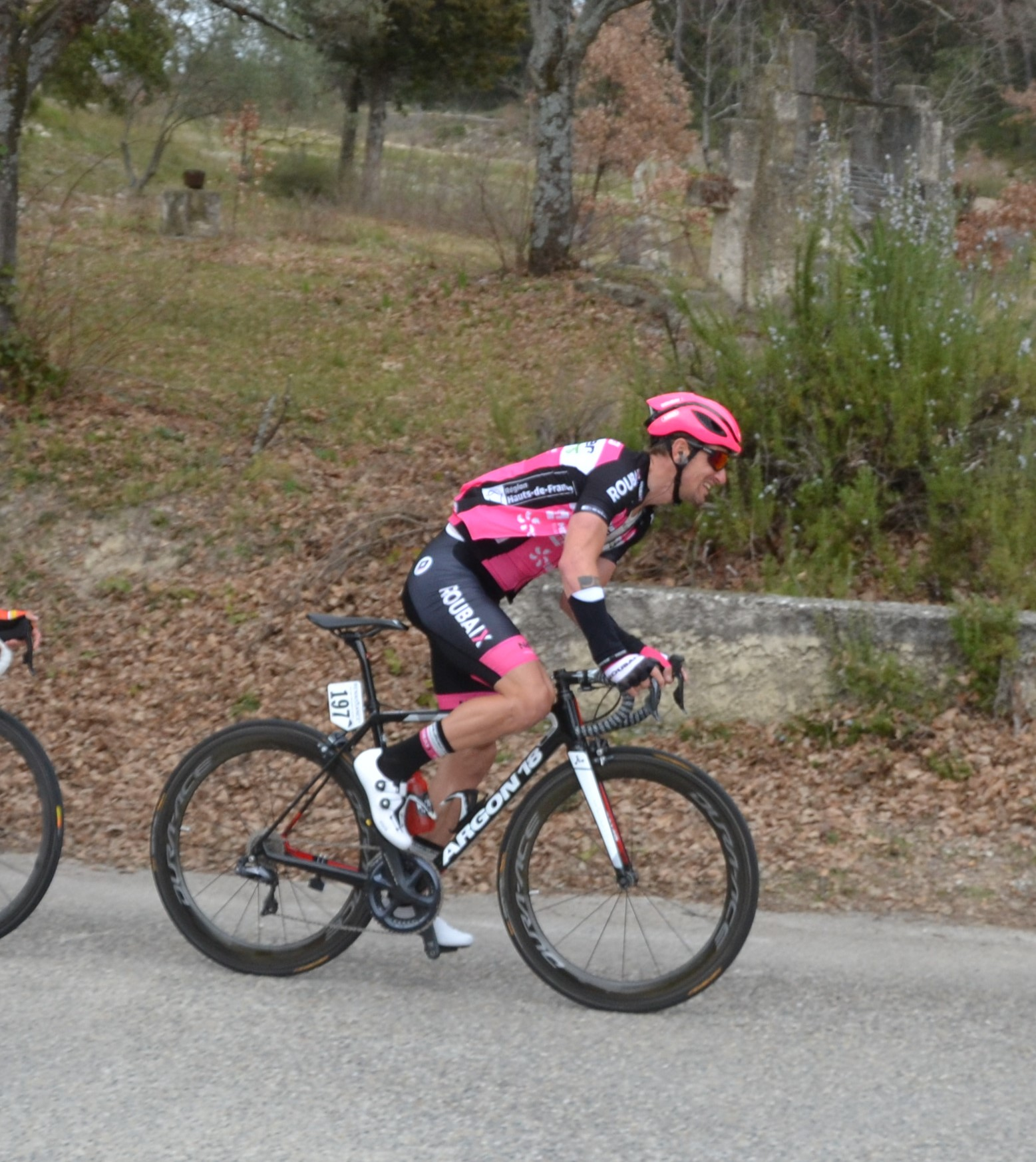
- Masson at the 2020 Tour de la Provence

Personal information
- Full name: Christophe Masson
- Born: 6 September 1985 (age 41) Saint-Omer or Hazebrouck, France
- Height: 1.81 m (5 ft 11 in)
- Weight: 68 kg (150 lb)

Cycling career
- Sport: Cycling
- Current team: OC Val d'Oise (rider); Philippe Wagner–Bazin (Directeur sportif)
- Discipline: Road
- Role: Rider; Directeur sportif

Amateur teams
- 2006: Vélo-Club de Roubaix Lille Métropole
- 2012: CC Isbergues Molinghem
- 2013–2016: EC Raismes Petite-Forêt
- 2021: VC Diekirch
- 2023–: OC Val d'Oise

Professional teams
- 2007–2008: Continental Team Differdange
- 2016: Veranclassic–Ago
- 2017–2018: WB Veranclassic Aqua Protect
- 2019–2020: Natura4Ever–Roubaix–Lille Métropole
- 2021: Cambodia Cycling Academy
- 2022: Geofco–Doltcini Matériel-vélo.com

Managerial team
- 2023–: Matériel-vélo.com

Christophe Masson (born 6 September 1985) is a French road bicycle racer, who rides for French amateur team OC Val d'Oise and works as a directeur sportif for UCI Continental team Philippe Wagner–Bazin. Masson rode professionally between 2007 and 2008, and again from 2016 to 2022, for the Differdange–Apiflo Vacances, Veranclassic–Ago, WB Aqua Protect Veranclassic, Natura4Ever–Roubaix–Lille Métropole, Cambodia Cycling Academy and Geofco–Doltcini Matériel-vélo.com teams. He competed in the 2017 Liège–Bastogne–Liège, finishing in 124th place.

== Major results ==
2007
6th Overall Tour de Taiwan
2015
7th Paris–Mantes-en-Yvelines
2016
6th UAE Cup
7th Paris–Mantes-en-Yvelines
