= Mirko Trosino =

Italian cyclist

Personal information
- Born: 19 October 1992 (age 33) San Miniato, Italy

Cycling career
- Sport: Cycling
- Current team: Vini Zabù
- Discipline: Road
- Role: Rider

Professional teams
- 2016: Southeast–Venezuela
- 2017: Wilier Triestina–Selle Italia
- 2018–: Amore & Vita–Prodir

Mirko Trosino (born 19 October 1992 in San Miniato) is an Italian road-racing cyclist.

== Major results ==
2012
1st Stage 7 Girobio
3rd U23 National Time Trial Championships
4th Memorial Elia Da Re
2017
8th National Time Trial Championships
2nd Overall Tour of China
