= Igantzi =

Town and municipality in Spain

Coordinates: 42°13′32″N 1°41′57″W

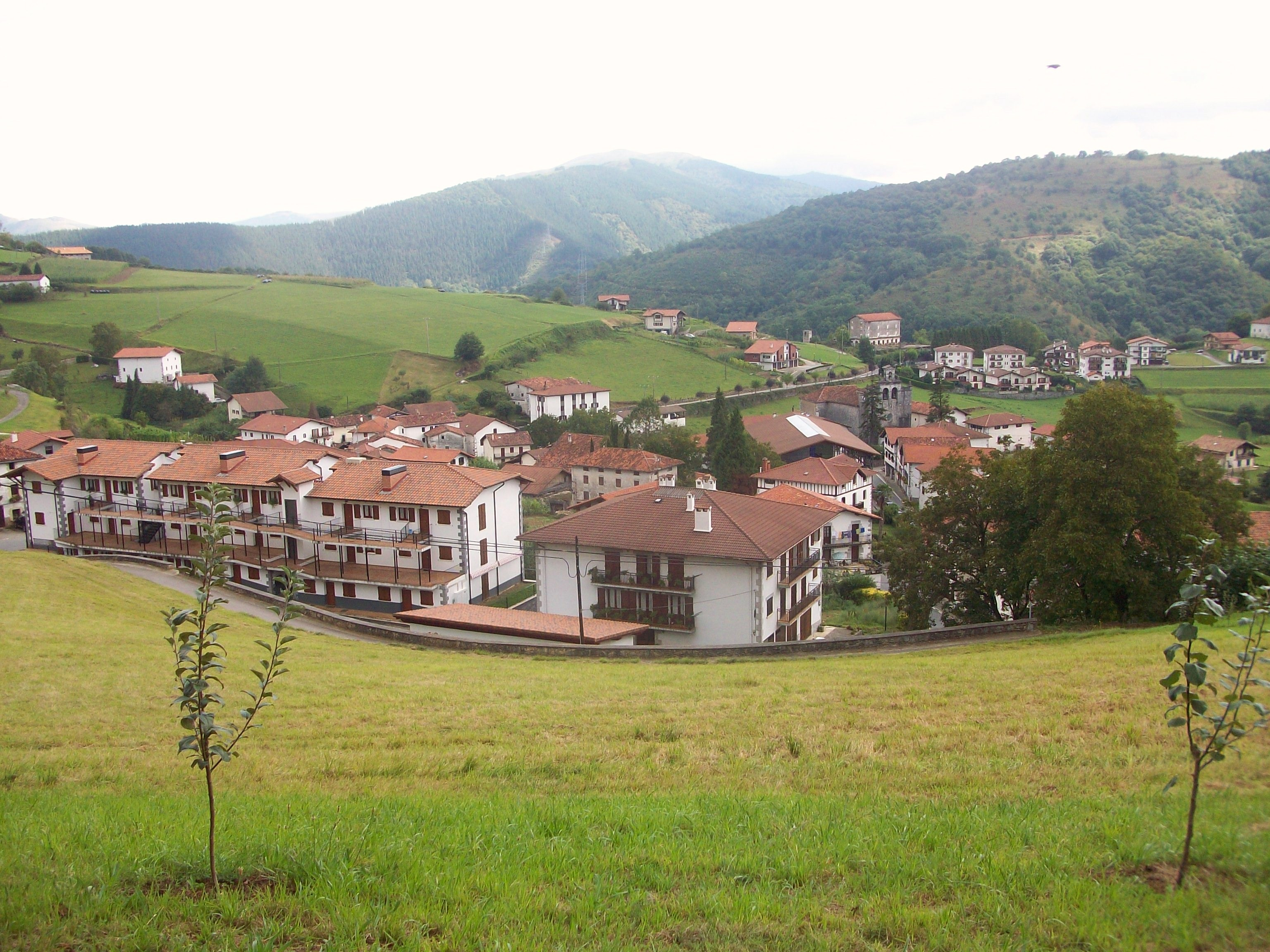

Igantzi is a town and municipality located in the province and autonomous community of Navarre, northern Spain.
