= Julien Stassen =

Belgian cyclist

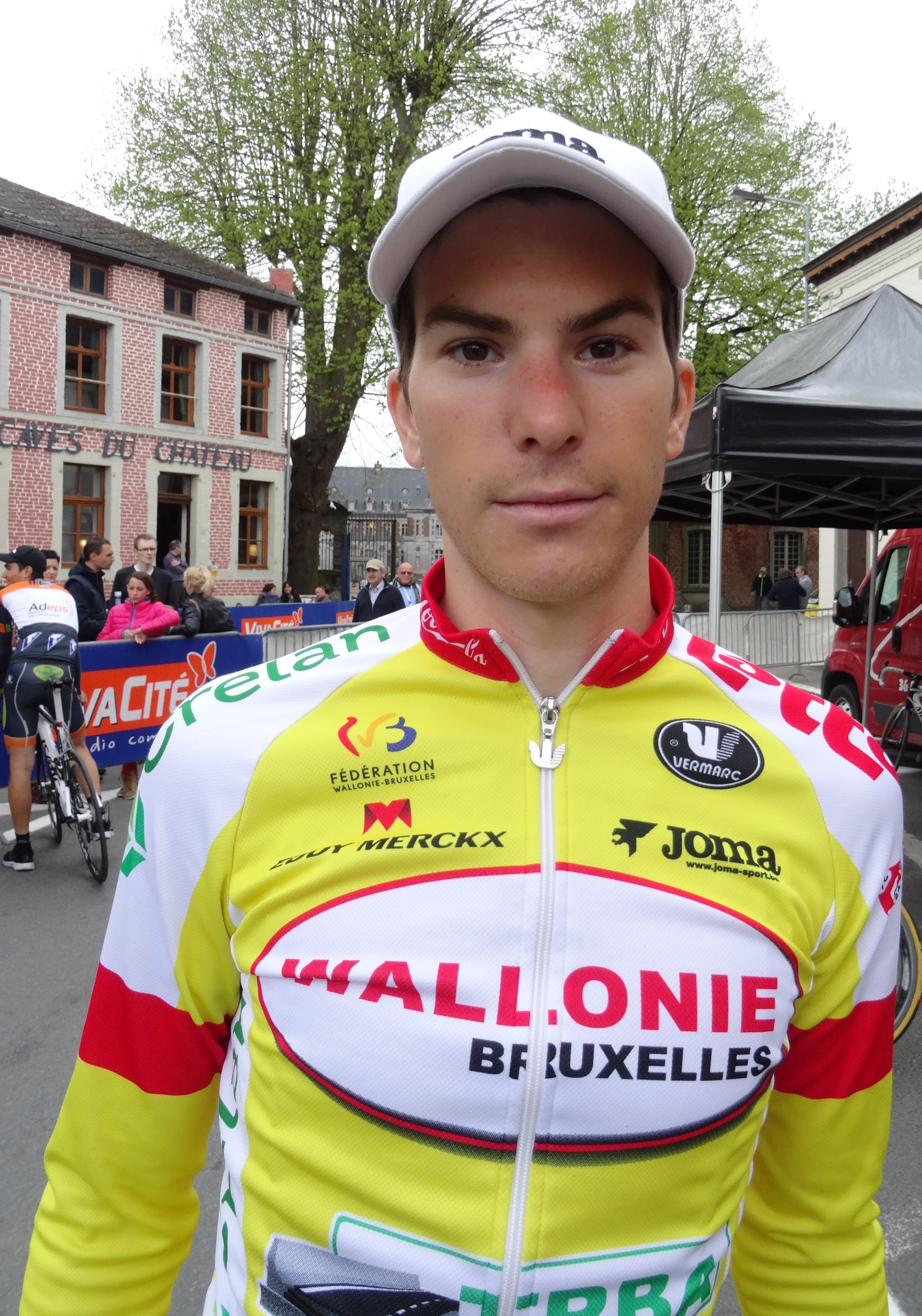
- Stassen in 2014.

Personal information
- Full name: Julien Stassen
- Born: 20 October 1988 (age 37) Verviers, Belgium
- Height: 1.82 m (6 ft 0 in)
- Weight: 66 kg (146 lb)

Cycling career
- Sport: Cycling
- Current team: Retired
- Discipline: Road
- Role: Rider

Amateur teams
- 2009: Lotto–Predictor–VC Ardennes
- 2010: RC Pesant Club Liégeois
- 2011: UC Seraing Crabbé Performance

Professional teams
- 2012: Idemasport–Biowanze
- 2013–2018: Wallonie-Bruxelles

Julien Stassen (born 20 October 1988) is a Belgian former professional road bicycle racer, who rode professionally between 2012 and 2018 for the Idemasport–Biowanze and WB Aqua Protect Veranclassic teams.

== Career ==
Born in Verviers, Stassen participated in several UCI World Tour events in 2017, including Gent–Wevelgem, Dwars door Vlaanderen, Omloop Het Nieuwsblad and E3 Harelbeke, but only finished Dwars door Vlaanderen, in 127th place.

== Major results ==
2012
4th Grand Prix Criquielion
9th Beverbeek Classic
2013
7th Schaal Sels
2014
5th Overall Circuit des Ardennes
6th Omloop van het Waasland
7th Ronde Pévéloise
2016
8th Flèche Ardennaise
10th Paris–Troyes
2017
7th Circuit de Wallonie
