= Nikolai Patrushev =

Russian politician and security officer (born 1951)

- Николай Патрушев
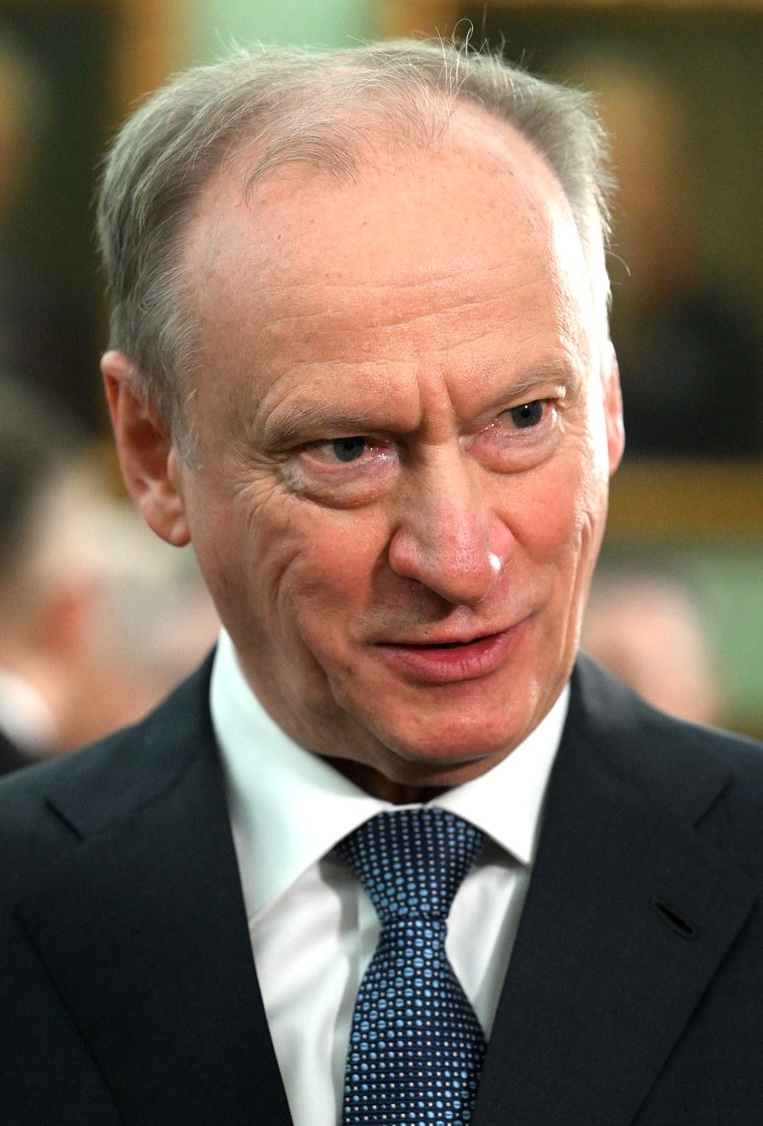
- Patrushev in 2023

Aide to the President of Russia
- Incumbent
- Assumed office 14 May 2024
- President: Vladimir Putin

Secretary of the Security Council of Russia
- In office 12 May 2008 – 12 May 2024
- Chairman: Vladimir Putin; Dmitry Medvedev
- Preceded by: Igor Ivanov; Valentin Sobolev (acting)
- Succeeded by: Sergei Shoigu

Director of the Federal Security Service
- In office 9 August 1999 – 12 May 2008
- President: Boris Yeltsin; Vladimir Putin
- Preceded by: Vladimir Putin
- Succeeded by: Alexander Bortnikov

Personal details
- Born: 11 July 1951 (age 75) Leningrad, Russian SFSR, Soviet Union
- Children: 2, including Dmitry
- Education: Leningrad Shipbuilding Institute
- Awards: Hero of the Russian Federation

Military service
- Allegiance: Soviet Union (1975-1991); Russia (1991-2008)
- Service: KGB (1975-1991); Federal Counterintelligence Service (1994-1995); Federal Security Service (1995-2008)
- Service years: 1975–2008
- Rank: General of the Army

Nikolai Platonovich Patrushev (Russian: Николай Платонович Патрушев; born 11 July 1951) is a Russian politician, security officer and former intelligence officer who served as the secretary of the Security Council of Russia from 2008 to 2024. He previously served as the director of the Federal Security Service (FSB) from 1999 to 2008.

Belonging to the siloviki faction of president Vladimir Putin's inner circle, Patrushev is believed to be one of the closest advisors to Putin and a leading figure behind Russia's national security affairs. Patrushev has spoken favorably of the rise of KGB stalwarts to the highest echelons of power of Russia, referring to them as the "new nobility".

He played a key role in the decisions to seize and then annex Crimea in 2014 and to invade Ukraine in 2022.

== Early life and education ==
Born on 11 July 1951 in Leningrad, Soviet Union (now Saint Petersburg, Russia), Patrushev is the son of a Soviet Navy officer who was also a member of the Communist Party of the Soviet Union.

Patrushev studied at secondary school No. 211 in the same class with the future chairman of the Supreme Council of the United Russia party, Boris Gryzlov. Patrushev graduated from Leningrad Shipbuilding Institute in 1974, and initially he worked as an engineer in the Institute's shipbuilding design bureau, but very soon afterwards, in 1975, he was recruited by the KGB.

He attended intelligence and security courses at the KGB School in Minsk, and later at the Higher School of the KGB in Moscow (the present-day FSB Academy).

Patrushev has known Vladimir Putin since the 1970s, when the two men worked together in the Leningrad KGB.

== Career ==
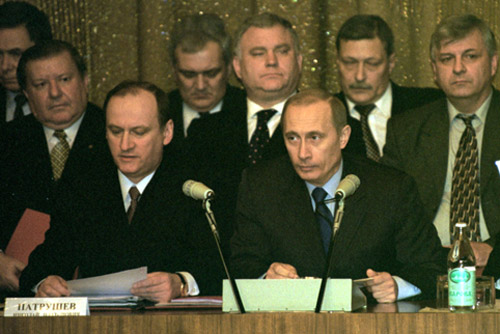
Russian president Putin and then-FSB director Patrushev at a meeting of the board of the Federal Security Service in 2002

=== KGB security officer (1975–1991) ===
Starting as a KGB security officer in the city of Leningrad, Patrushev eventually rose to become head of their local anti-smuggling and anti-corruption unit.

=== FSK and FSB career (1992–1999) ===
After the collapse of the Soviet Union, Patrushev continued to work in the security services and from 1992 to 1994 he was Minister of Security of the Republic of Karelia while in 1994 he was brought to Moscow as head of the Directorate of Internal Security of the Federal Counterintelligence Service (FSK).

In June 1995, Patrushev became deputy chief of the FSB's Organization and Inspection Department. From May to August 1998, he was chief of the Control Directorate of the Presidential Staff; from August to October, he was Deputy Chief of the Presidential Staff; in October 1998, he was appointed deputy director of the FSB and chief of the directorate for Economic Security. In April 1999, he became FSB First Deputy Director.

=== Director of FSB (1999–2008) ===
On 9 August 1999, a decree by President Boris Yeltsin promoted him to director, replacing his close friend Vladimir Putin.

In September 1999, a series of explosions hit four apartment blocks in three Russian cities, killing more than 300. The bombings, together with the Invasion of Dagestan, triggered the Second Chechen War. The handling of the crisis by Vladimir Putin, who was prime minister at the time, boosted his popularity greatly and helped him attain the presidency within a few months. A suspicious device resembling those used in the bombings was found and defused in an apartment block in the Russian city of Ryazan on 22 September 1999. On 23 September, Vladimir Putin praised the vigilance of the inhabitants of Ryazan and ordered the air bombing of Grozny, which marked the beginning of the Second Chechen War. Three FSB agents who had planted the devices at Ryazan were arrested by the local police. The next day, Patrushev announced that the incident in Ryazan had been an anti-terror drill and the device found there contained only sugar, and freed the FSB agents involved. FSB also issued a public apology about the incident.

Although the bombings were widely blamed on Chechen rebels, their guilt was never conclusively proven. A number of historians and investigative journalists have instead called the bombings a false flag attack perpetrated by the FSB to win public support for a new war in Chechnya and to boost the popularity of Vladimir Putin, the former head of the FSB, prior to the upcoming presidential elections.

Former FSB agent Alexander Litvinenko, who blamed the FSB for the bombings and was a critic of Putin, was assassinated in London in 2006. The United Kingdom public inquiry into the poisoning of Litvinenko found that "the FSB operation to kill Mr Litvinenko was probably approved by Mr Patrushev and also by President Putin."

=== Security Council of Russia (2008–2024) ===
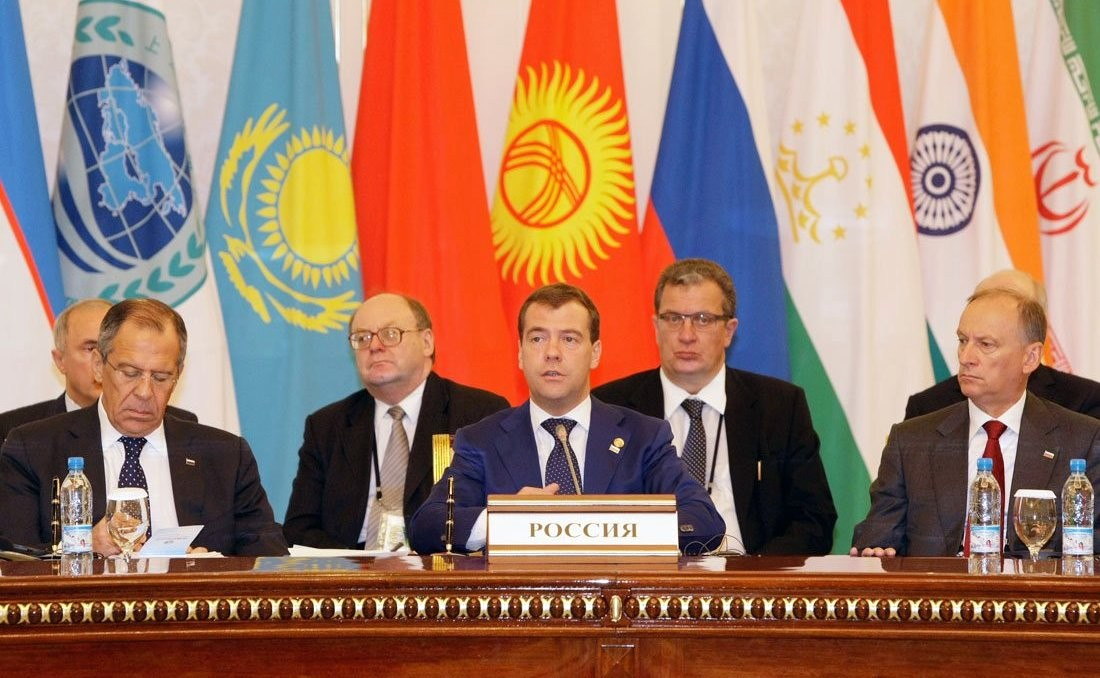
Dmitry Medvedev with Sergei Lavrov and Patrushev at the 2010 SCO Summit in Tashkent, Uzbekistan

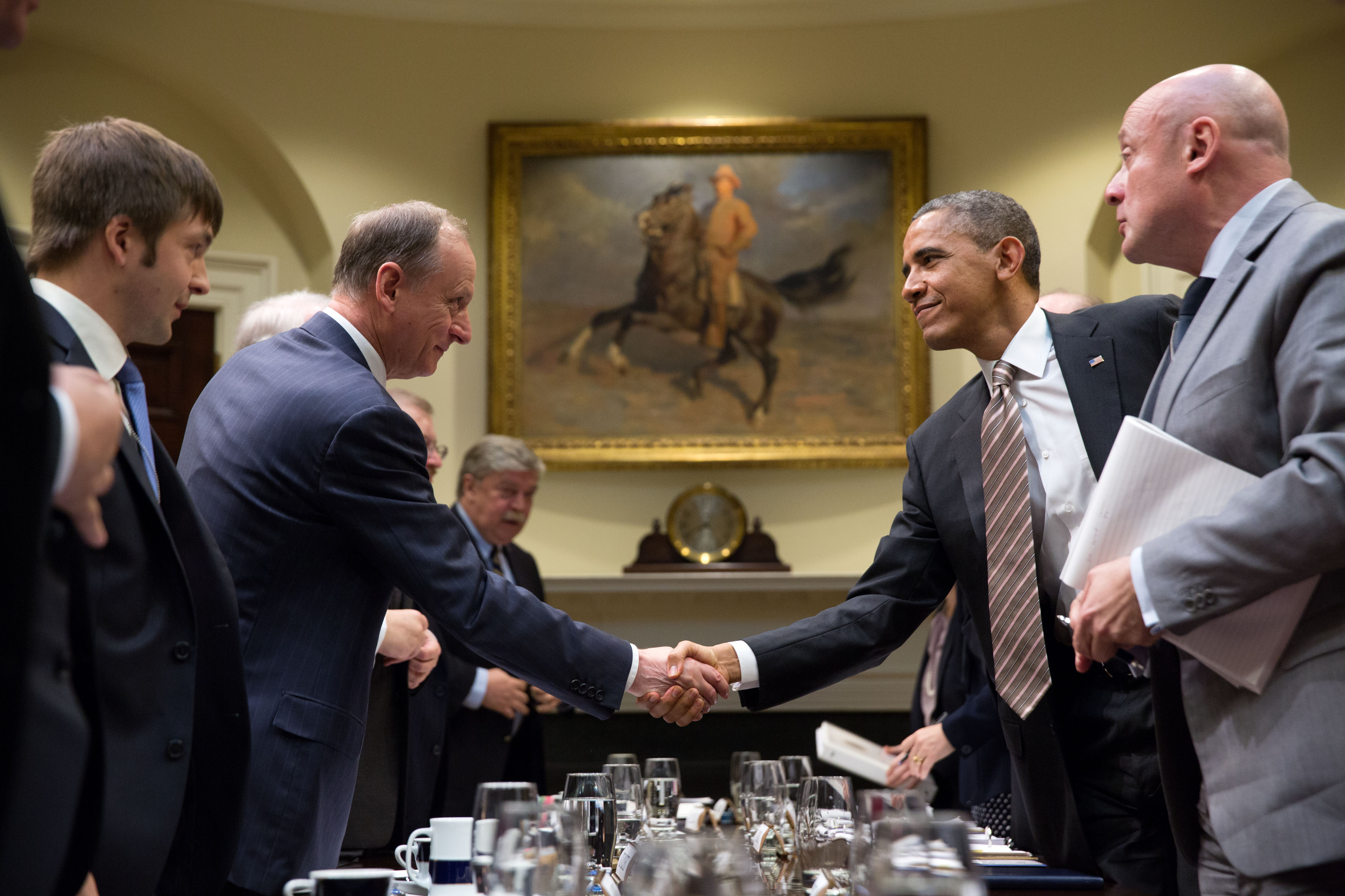
Patrushev with Barack Obama at the White House in May 2013

From May 2008 until May 2024, Patrushev had been Secretary of the Security Council of Russia, a consultative body of the president that works out his decisions on national security affairs.

Patrushev considers the 2014 Revolution of Dignity in Ukraine to have been started by the United States.

Patrushev believes that the United States "would much prefer that Russia did not exist at all."

Following the October 2016 coup d'état plot failure in Montenegro, Patrushev was cited by experts, such as Mark Galeotti, as the Kremlin's point man for the Balkans, which was interpreted as indicating Russia's increasingly hardline approach to the region as well as the latter's growing importance in Russia's foreign policy strategy.

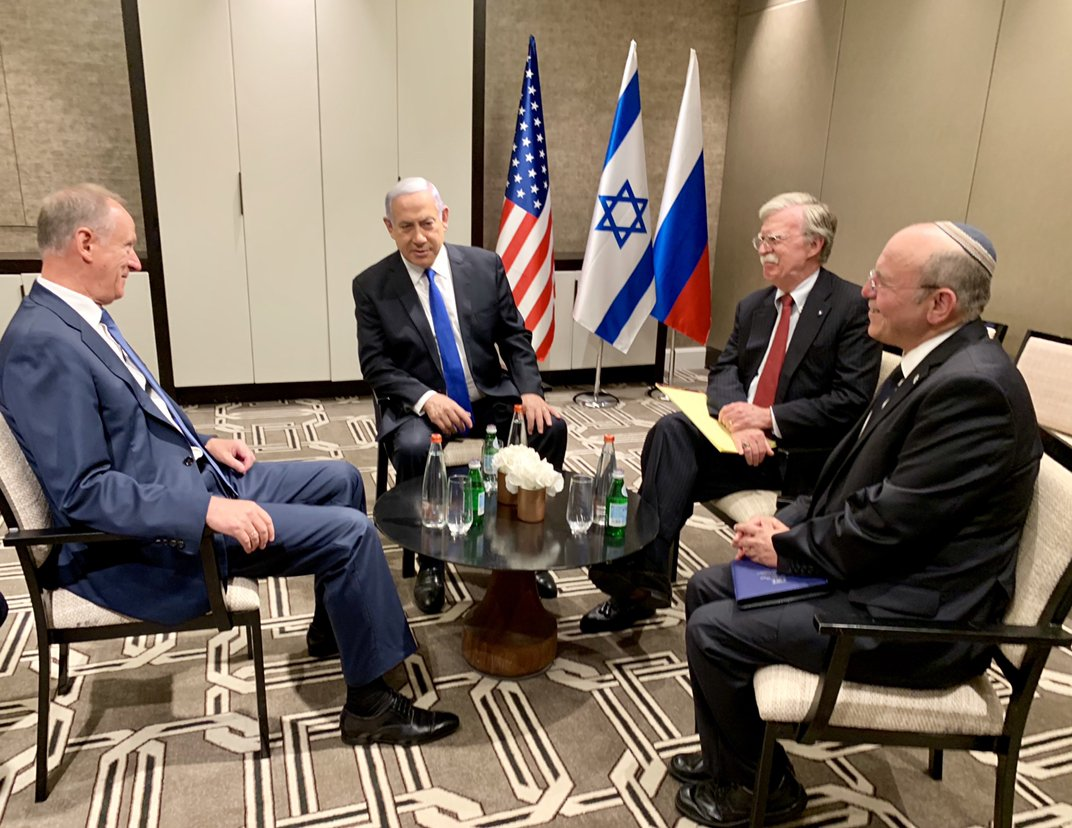
Patrushev with Benjamin Netanyahu and John Bolton in June 2019

According to Anastasia Vashukevich, Patrushev, who had traveled to Thailand during late February 2018, was involved in her arrest in Thailand during late February 2018. Vashukevich claimed to have evidence linking Russian billionaire Oleg Deripaska and Deputy Prime Minister Sergei Prikhodko to Russian interference in the 2016 U.S. presidential election.

In June 2019, Patrushev said that Iran "has always been and remains our ally and partner".

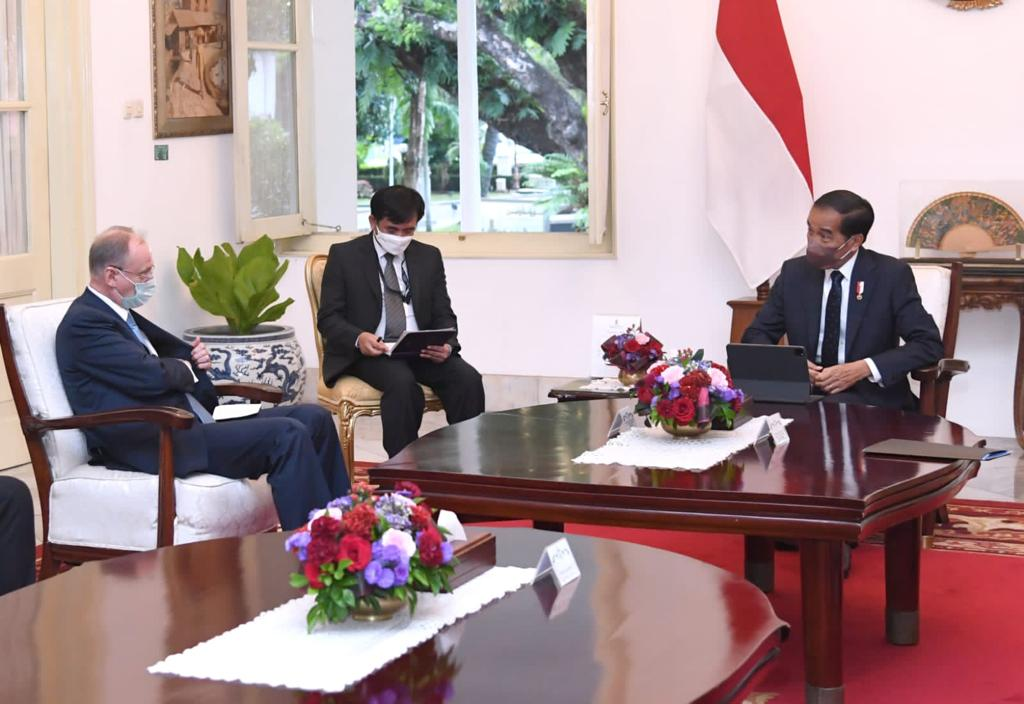
Patrushev with Joko Widodo in Jakarta in December 2021

In January 2021, he said that "the West needs" Russian opposition politician Alexei Navalny "to destabilise the situation in Russia, for social upheaval, strikes and new Maidans."

Patrushev was a leading figure behind Russia's updated national security strategy, published in May 2021. It states that Russia may use "forceful methods" to "thwart or avert unfriendly actions that threaten the sovereignty and territorial integrity of the Russian Federation."

On 19 September 2022, during his visit to China, he described the "strengthening of comprehensive partnership and strategic cooperation with Beijing as an unconditional priority of Russia's foreign policy." He said that both China and Russia are calling for "a more just world order".

On 18 November 2022, he arrived in Tehran and met with Iranian president Ebrahim Raisi and top security official Ali Shamkhani. On 21 November 2022, he invited Vietnamese Minister of Public Security Tô Lâm to Moscow to strengthen security cooperation between Russia and Vietnam. On 31 January 2023, he met Egypt's Foreign Minister Sameh Shoukry in Moscow.

In February 2023, he hosted CCP Politburo member Wang Yi in Moscow and prepared the ground for the visit of CCP General Secretary Xi Jinping to Russia in March 2023. Patrushev said that "amid a campaign by the West to deter both Russia and China, it is particularly important to further deepen the Russian-Chinese coordination and cooperation in the international arena."

In February and March 2023, he visited Algeria, Venezuela and Cuba. On 29 March 2023, Patrushev arrived in New Delhi and met with Indian prime minister Narendra Modi. In September 2023, he expressed support for China's policies regarding Hong Kong, Xinjiang and Taiwan. In February 2024, he met with the leaders of Nicaragua, Bolivia, Cuba and Venezuela.

Patrushev is considered as very hawkish towards the West and the United States, and in 2022 was seen by some observers as one of the likeliest candidates for succeeding Putin.

==== 2022 invasion of Ukraine ====
In August 2021, during the withdrawal of U.S. troops from Afghanistan, Patrushev told Izvestia newspaper that the United States had abandoned its Afghan allies, and that the reason was the incompetent work of the intelligence services of the United States, Britain and other NATO countries and the misplaced belief of the West in the correctness of its decisions. He predicted that the United States would also abandon its allies in Ukraine:

"...Kyiv is obsequiously serving the interests of its overseas patrons, striving to get into NATO. But was the ousted pro-American regime in Kabul saved by the fact that Afghanistan had the status of a principal U.S. ally outside NATO? (No). A similar situation awaits supporters of the American choice in Ukraine."

In early November 2021, CIA Director William Burns and U.S. ambassador to Russia John Sullivan met in Moscow with Patrushev and informed him that they knew about Russia's invasion plans. Burns warned that if Putin proceeded down this path, the West would respond with severe consequences for Russia. Sullivan recounted that Patrushev was undeterred and "supremely confident" that the invasion was going to succeed. However, in late January 2022, just before the invasion, Patrushev publicly denied that Russia was prepared to attack Ukraine.

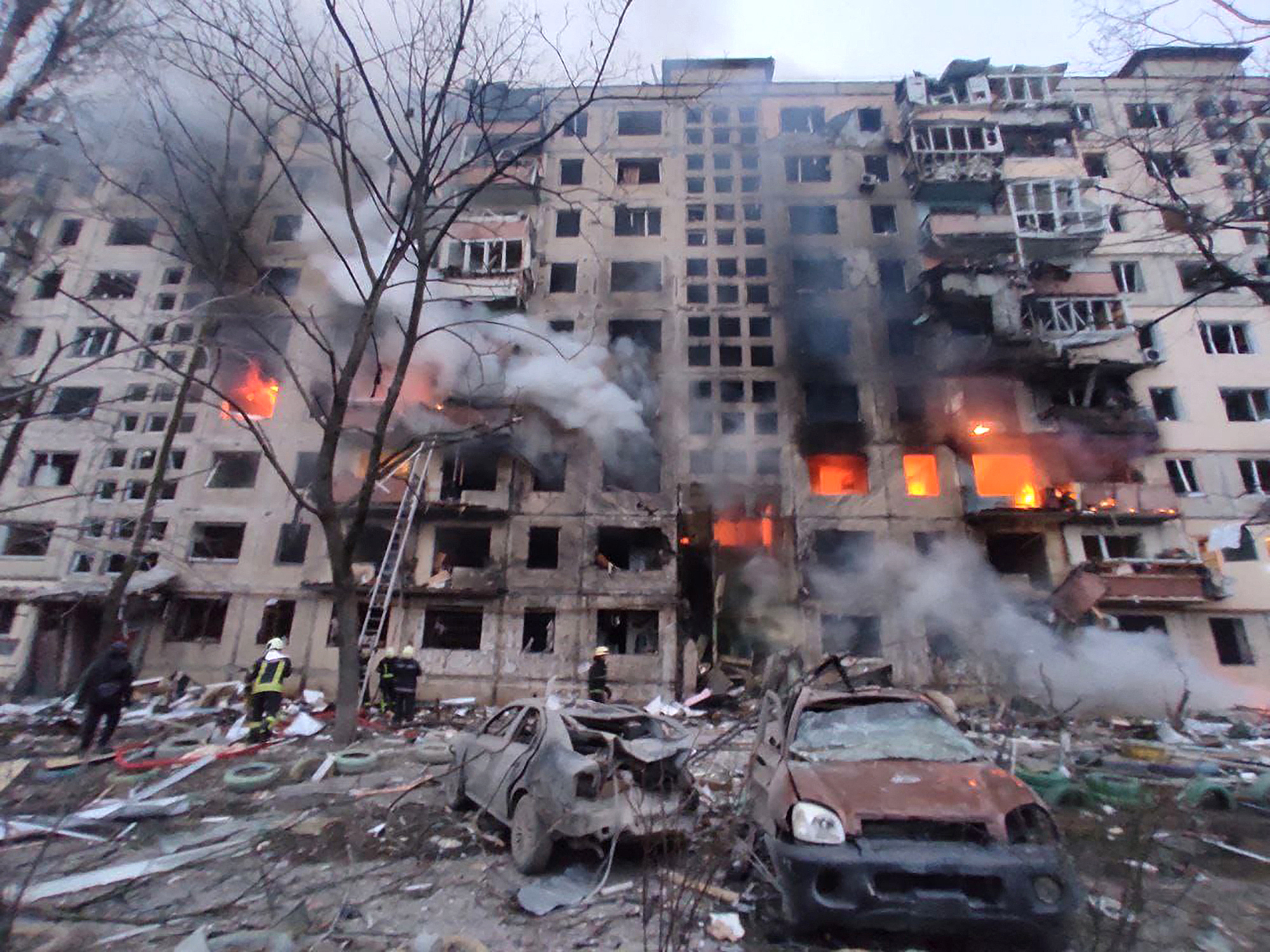
Kyiv after Russian shelling in March 2022. Patrushev played a key role in Putin's decision to invade Ukraine.

Sources say Putin's decision to invade Ukraine was influenced by a small group of war hawks around him, including Patrushev and Russia's defence minister Sergei Shoigu. According to Putin-regime expert Catherine Belton, it was "Patrushev who's always been the leading ideologue of using capitalism as a tool to undermine the West to buy off and corrupt officials and so on. And he's certainly very much painted the West as a hostile enemy of Russia and something which is kind of debauched and decrepit, and it's time to attack [Ukraine in 2022]." According to sources close to the Kremlin, most of Putin's close advisers opposed the invasion, and even Patrushev advised Putin to give diplomacy another chance three days before the invasion, but Putin overruled them all.

On 26 April 2022, after two months of war, Patrushev predicted that Ukraine would collapse and be broken into several states because of what he cast as a U.S. attempt to use Kyiv to undermine Russia. He repeated the "denazification" trope and claimed:

"Using their henchmen in Kyiv, the Americans, in an attempt to suppress Russia, decided to create an antipode of our country, cynically choosing Ukraine for this, trying to divide essentially a single people. The result of the policy of the West and the regime in Kyiv can only be the disintegration of Ukraine into several states."

Patrushev claimed that "Ukraine, saturated with weapons, poses a threat to Russia". He downplayed the sanctions against Russia and said that "Russia is reorienting itself away from the European market to the African, Asian and Latin American markets."

In April 2022, he addressed the global food crisis, caused in part by Russia's invasion of Ukraine, saying that "Tens of millions of people in Africa or the Middle East, through the fault of the West, will be on the verge of starvation. To survive, they will rush to Europe. I'm not sure that Europe will survive the crisis."

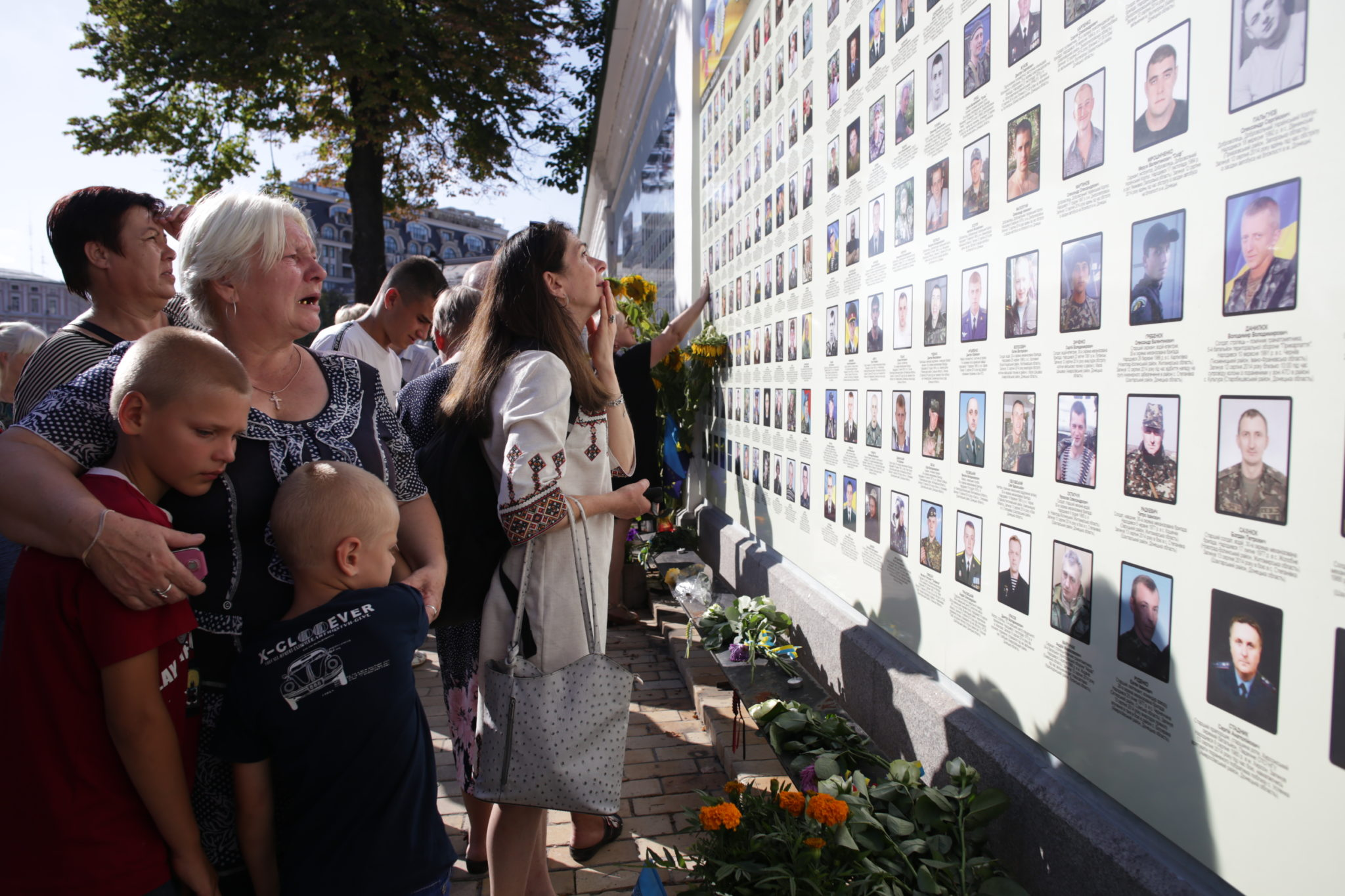
Photos of Ukrainian soldiers who died during the Russo-Ukrainian War. Patrushev accused the West of wanting to "fight to the last Ukrainian".

In May 2022, he speculated that Poland "is already taking actions related to the seizure of western Ukrainian territories." He claimed that the West "has already revived the shadow market for the purchase of human organs from the socially vulnerable segments of the Ukrainian population for clandestine transplant operations for European patients."

On 17 August 2022, Patrushev met with Narendra Modi's National Security Advisor Ajit Doval to discuss measures to strengthen the strategic partnership across sectors including defense ties and energy security. Russia appreciated India's neutral position on Ukraine.

In October 2022, Patrushev accused the United States and its allies of wanting to "fight to the last Ukrainian". He said that Anglo-Saxons "are exploiting Ukraine as an instrument of struggle with our country ... The goal is to suppress Russia, retain their imaginary supremacy, keep their unipolar world, ensure themselves the opportunity to live at the expense of others.

In November 2022, Patrushev accused the West of inciting Ukraine to attacks on the Zaporizhzhia Nuclear Power Plant and of assisting in the production of a "dirty bomb". He also accused the United States of wanting to recruit terrorists from Afghanistan and use them in the fight against Russia in Ukraine. He claimed that the West wants to destabilize the world to maintain its global dominance, saying that the "reckless policy of Washington, London, and their allies resulted in bloody adventures in the Balkans, Iraq, Libya, Syria, Afghanistan and Ukraine, which have already claimed the lives of hundreds of thousands of people."

In January 2023, he claimed that Russia was fighting NATO in Ukraine and that the West was trying to destroy Russia.

In February 2023, during a meeting with CCP Politburo member Wang Yi in Moscow, Patrushev claimed that "the bloody events in Ukraine staged by the West" are just one example of the West's attempts to maintain its global dominance.

In May 2023, Patrushev blamed the United States and Ukraine for the number of attacks in western Russia and said that "the terrorist attacks committed in Russia are accompanied by an information campaign prepared in advance in Washington and London, designed to destabilise the socio-political situation, and to undermine the constitutional foundations and sovereignty of Russia."

On 15 September 2023, Patrushev claimed that Russia had identified and "neutralized" hundreds of foreign spies in recent years.

In September 2023, he met the Chinese foreign minister in Moscow for the annual security talks. On 10 October 2023, he arrived in Baku, Azerbaijan, where he met with Azerbaijani President Ilham Aliyev.

On 22 December 2023, The Wall Street Journal cited sources within the Western and Russian intelligence agencies as saying that the Wagner Group plane crash was orchestrated by Patrushev. The paper alleged that Patrushev presented to Putin a plan to assassinate Yevgeny Prigozhin in August 2023, which led to intelligence officials inserting a bomb under the wing of Prigozhin's plane during pre-departure safety checks.

In March 2024, Patrushev claimed that Ukraine was behind the Crocus City Hall attack in Moscow.

On 12 May 2024, Putin nominated outgoing defense minister Sergei Shoigu to replace Patrushev as the secretary of the Security Council of the Russian Federation, effective as of 14 May 2024. Patrushev was appointed as a Presidential Aide.

On 16 August 2024, Patrushev claimed, without providing evidence, that the Ukrainian invasion of the Kursk Oblast was "planned with the participation of NATO and Western special services", calling the incursion "a desperate act, driven by the impending collapse of the neo-Nazi regime in Kyiv."

=== Presidential aide ===
Patrushev was offered to become presidential aide in charge of shipbuilding after Putin's fifth inauguration. According to Abbas Gallyamov, this was a demotion because Putin felt that Patrushev had misled him by his hawkishness on Ukraine, but Gallyamov may not have accounted for a presidential decree published one day earlier that re-enlisted Patrushev to the Security Council.

== Sanctions ==
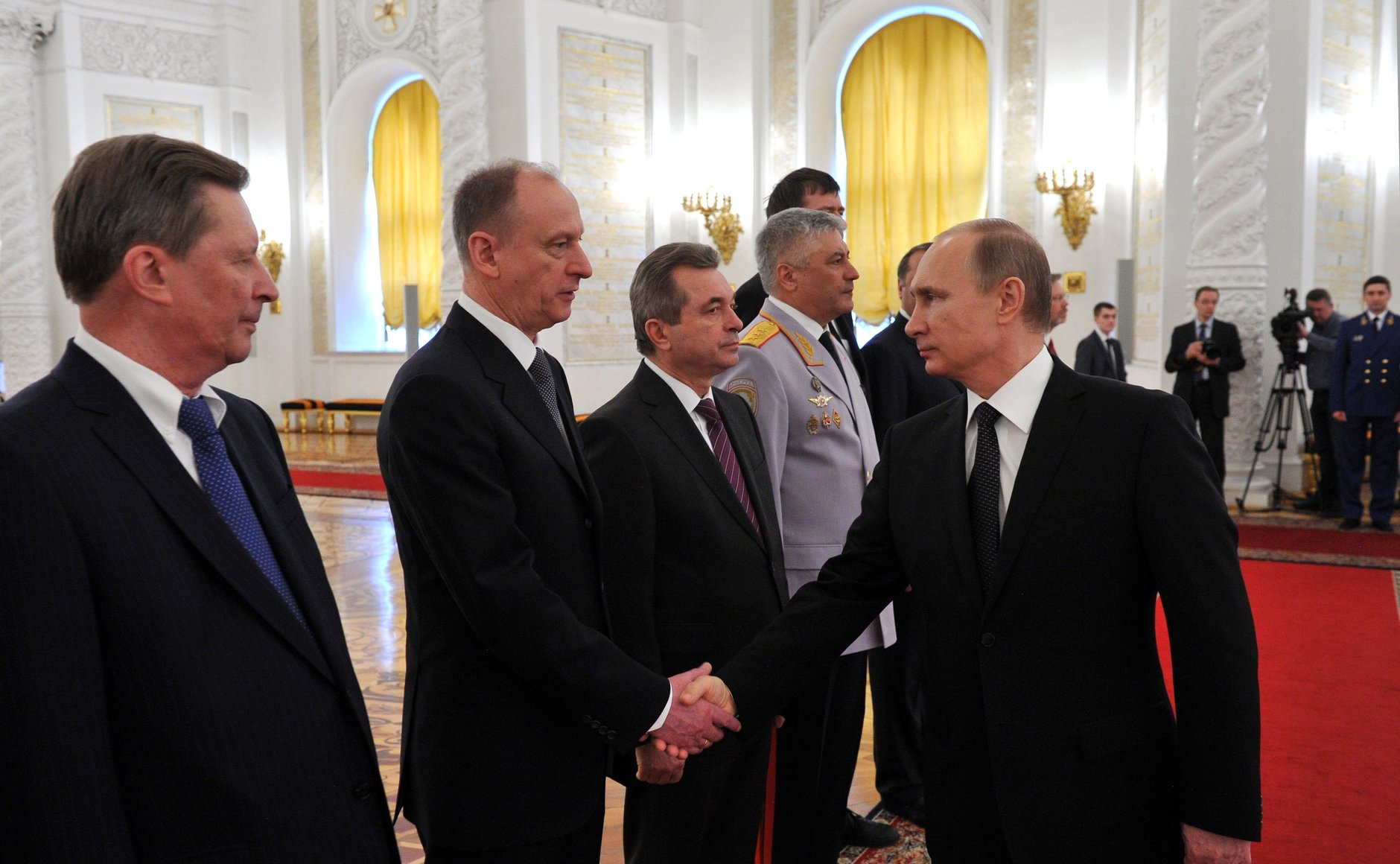
Patrushev at a meeting of Vladimir Putin with senior officers and prosecutors in April 2015

After the 2014 annexation of Crimea by the Russian Federation, Patrushev was placed on the European Union's list of sanctioned individuals in Russia.

Patrushev was personally sanctioned by the UK government in 2014 in relation to Russo-Ukrainian War.

In April 2018, the United States imposed sanctions on him and 23 other Russian nationals.

Following the 2022 Russian invasion of Ukraine, the United States imposed sanctions against Andrey Patrushev, son of Nikolai Patrushev.

He was sanctioned by New Zealand in relation to the 2022 Russian invasion of Ukraine.

== Political views ==
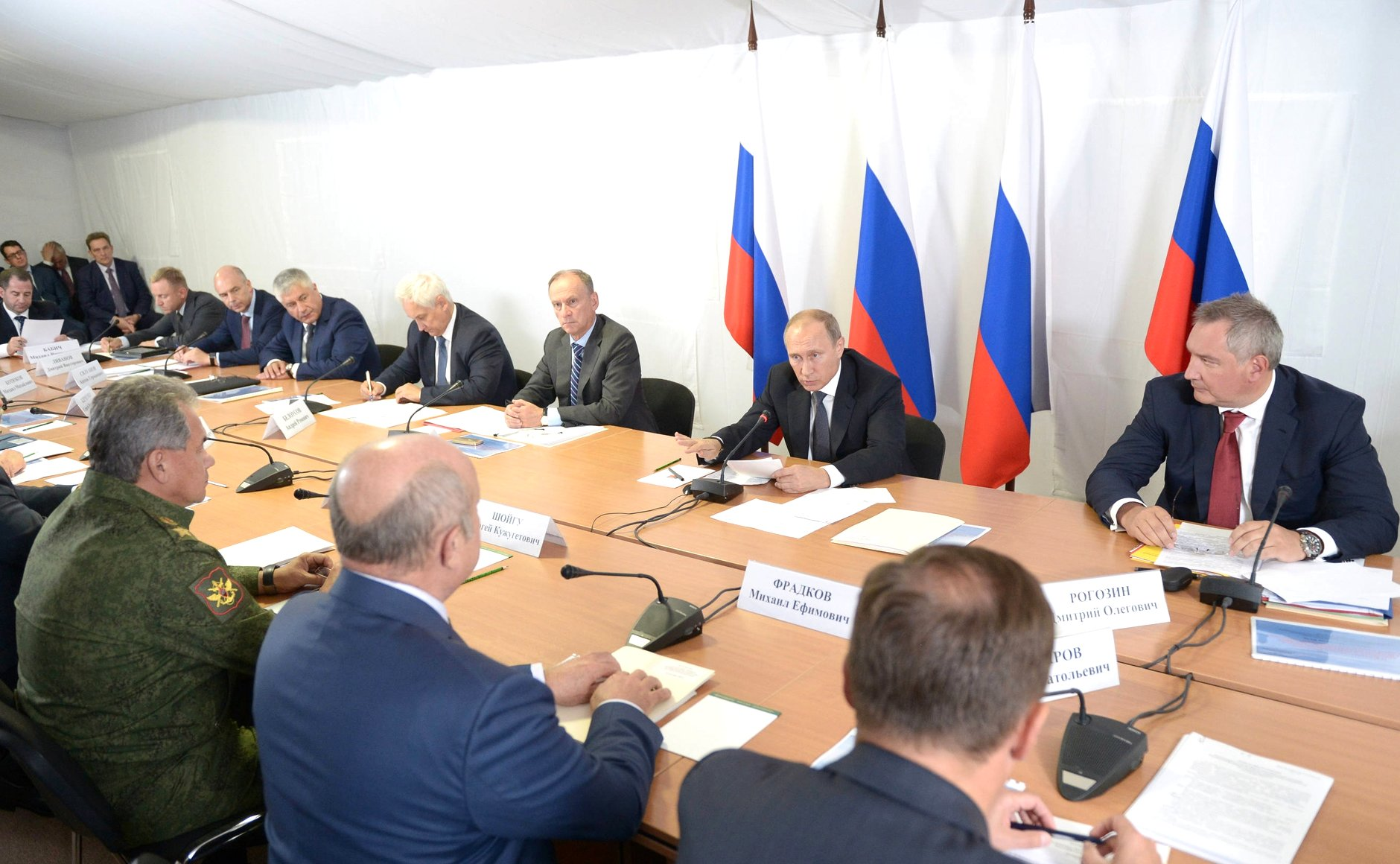
A meeting of the Military-Industrial Commission of Russia in September 2015

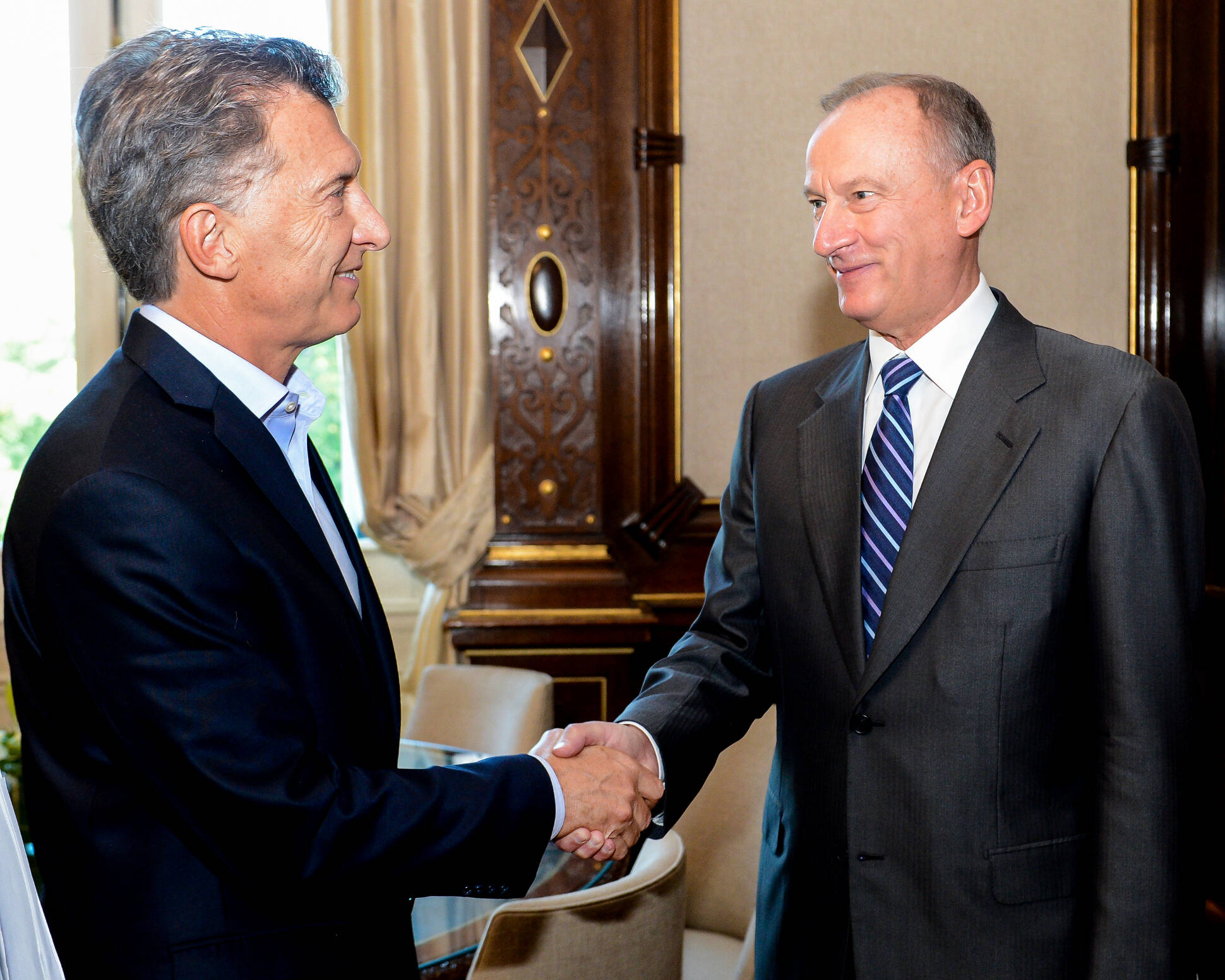
Patrushev with Argentine president Mauricio Macri in December 2017. Patrushev promoted friendly relations between Russia and non-Western countries.

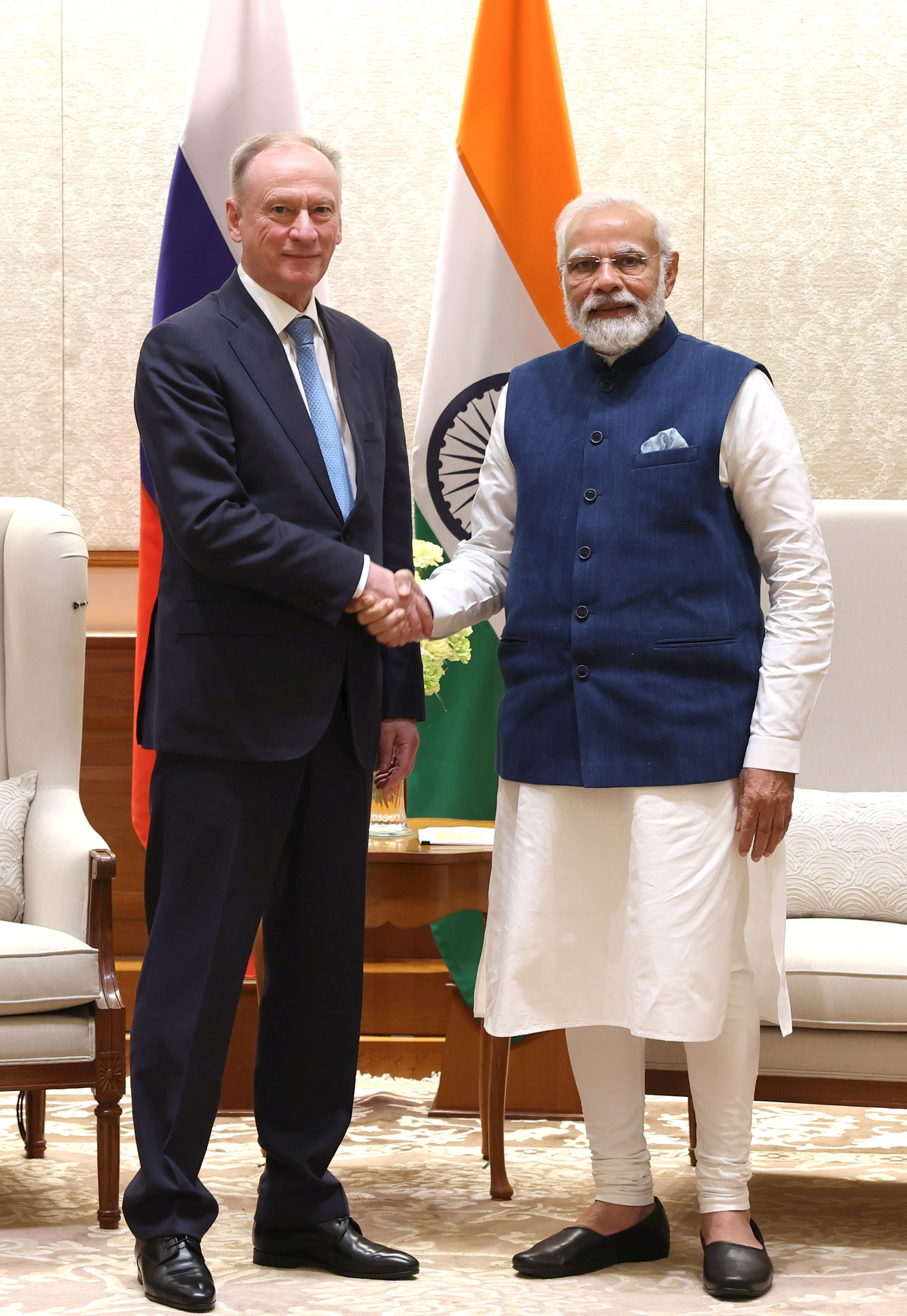
Patrushev and Narendra Modi in New Delhi in March 2023

Patrushev belongs to the siloviki of Putin's inner circle. (Note: Other siloviki close to Patrushev include Igor Sechin, Alexander Bortnikov, and Viktor Ivanov.) Mark Galeotti, an expert in the field of Russian politics and security, said that Patrushev, one of Putin's closest advisers, is the "most dangerous man in Russia" because of his "paranoid conspiracy-driven mindset." For his ability to control information reaching Putin, Galeotti compared him to Sir Humphrey from the British television series Yes Minister. According to Andrey Kolesnikov of the Carnegie Endowment for International Peace, Patrushev speaks for Putin and is "allowed to explain and clarify Putin's thoughts."

In December 2000, on the anniversary of the founding of the Bolshevik secret police, the Cheka, an interview with him was published in Komsomolskaya Pravda. In defence of the emerging trend of co-opting officers in the security and intelligence apparatus into high government posts, Patrushev noted that his FSB colleagues did not "work for money [...] [they] are, if you will, modern 'neo-nobility'." ("современные «неодворяне»") The term "new nobility" gained currency afterwards, as in the eponymous book The New Nobility.

Ben Noble, Associate Professor of Russian Politics at University College London, describes Patrushev as "the most hawkish hawk, thinking the West has been out to get Russia for years". He was quoted as saying, "The Americans believe that we control [our natural resources] illegally and undeservedly because, in their view, we do not use them as they ought to be used." Patrushev has referenced "Madeleine Albright's claim 'that neither the Far East nor Siberia belong to Russia.'" According to the New York Times, this remark can be traced back to a psychic employed by the FSB who claimed to have read the thoughts in Albright's mind while in a state of trance. In June 2020, he said that a "shameful page in history for all NATO countries was and will forever remain the barbaric" NATO bombing of Yugoslavia in 1999.

Patrushev believes in various conspiracy theories and often gives interviews to state-controlled media in Russia. In April 2022, he said that Washington "tried to force Russia to give up sovereignty, self-consciousness, culture, an independent foreign and domestic policy." He claimed that the West is seeking to reduce "the world's population in various ways," including creating "an empire of lies, involving the humiliation and destruction of Russia and other objectionable states." In June 2022, he accused the United States, Britain, the EU and Japan of an "increasingly adventurous and aggressive policy" that "is based on a complete detachment from reality, the desire to construct their own imaginary world, which they will rule. Such an escape from reality is a real threat to all of humanity." In his interview in an official government paper Rossiyskaya Gazeta, he said that the Russo-Ukrainian War is only part of a wider war with NATO and the "collective West". He warned that Russia "has modern, unique weapons capable of destroying any adversary, including the United States, in the event of a threat to its existence."

According to Russian expert at the Carnegie Center, Alexander Sorkin, Patrushev and FSB director Alexander Bortnikov were formed by the Cold War between the United States and the Soviet Union and "believe that a bloc confrontation with the West is a reasonable and correct world order. And in order to return to a predictable and manageable confrontation, it is necessary to divide the zones of influence through war, even with the risk of a clash with NATO. According to Patrushev and Bortnikov, Ukraine should be in the Russian zone of influence".

== Personal life ==
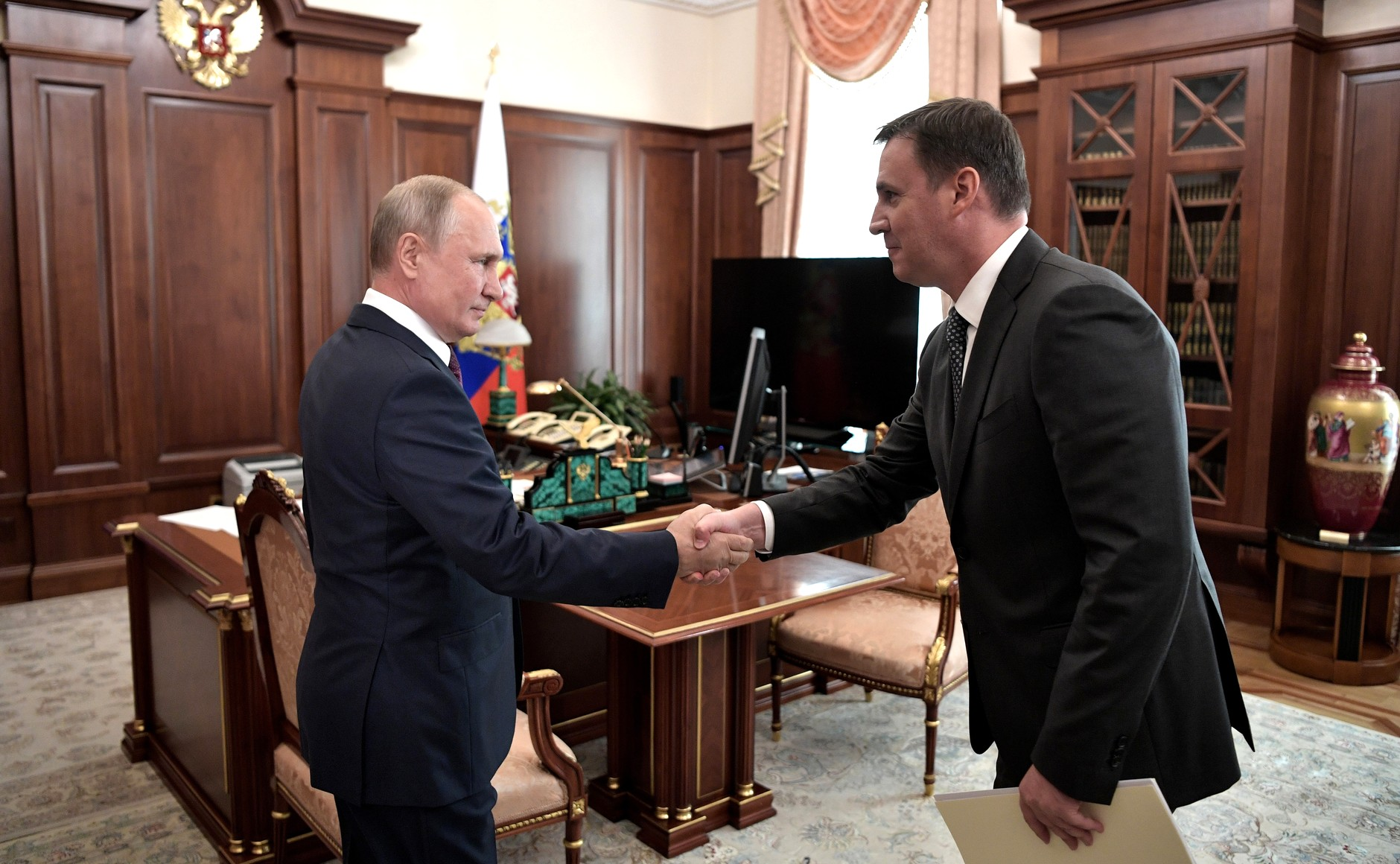
Dmitry Patrushev with Putin in September 2019

His eldest son, Dmitry, is a banker and the deputy prime minister for Agriculture since 2024, he previously served as Minister of Agriculture of Russia from May 2018 until 2024. His younger son, Andrey, graduated in 2003 from the FSB Academy where he studied law with his classmate Pavel Fradkov, who is the son of Mikhail Fradkov, and has worked in leadership roles at Gazprom Neft.

In January 2007, Nikolai Patrushev and his brother, Viktor Platonovich Patrushev (Russian: Виктор Платонович Патрушев), joined the expedition of polar explorer Arthur Chilingarov, that flew on two helicopters to Antarctica and visited the South Pole and the Amundsen-Scott station.

== Honours and awards ==
- Hero of the Russian Federation (2000)
- Order of St Dmitri Donskoy, the Blessed Great Prince of Moscow, 1st Class (Russian Orthodox Church, 2005) – The saint allegedly wards off "all kinds of threats for the sake of multiplying the faith and piety of the people, strengthening families and protecting from bodily extinction and spiritual death."
- Honored Officer of the Security Agencies

== See also ==
- List of Heroes of the Russian Federation

== Notes ==
Government offices
Preceded by Vladimir Putin	Head of the Internal Security Department of FSB; 1994 – 31 May 1998	Succeeded by Viktor Ivanov
Preceded by Vladimir Putin	Chief of the Control Directorate of the Russian presidential administration 31 May 1998 – October 1998	Succeeded by Yevgeny Lisov
Preceded by Vladimir Putin	Director of FSB; 9 August 1999 – 12 May 2008	Succeeded by Alexander Bortnikov
Preceded by Igor Ivanov	Secretary of the Security Council of Russia; 12 May 2008 – 12 May 2024	Succeeded by Sergei Shoigu
