= Josu Zabala =

Spanish cyclist

Personal information
- Full name: Josu Zabala López
- Born: 11 April 1993 (age 33) Lumbier, Spain

Cycling career
- Sport: Cycling
- Discipline: Road
- Role: Rider

Amateur teams
- 2013: Reyno de Navarra–WRC–Makor
- 2014–2016: Caja Rural amateur

Professional teams
- 2016: Caja Rural–Seguros RGA (stagiaire)
- 2017–2018: Caja Rural–Seguros RGA
- 2019: UD Oliveirense–InOutBuild

Josu Zabala López (born 11 April 1993 in Lumbier) is a Spanish cyclist, who last rode for UCI Continental team UD Oliveirense–InOutBuild.
