= Gotzon Udondo =

Spanish cyclist

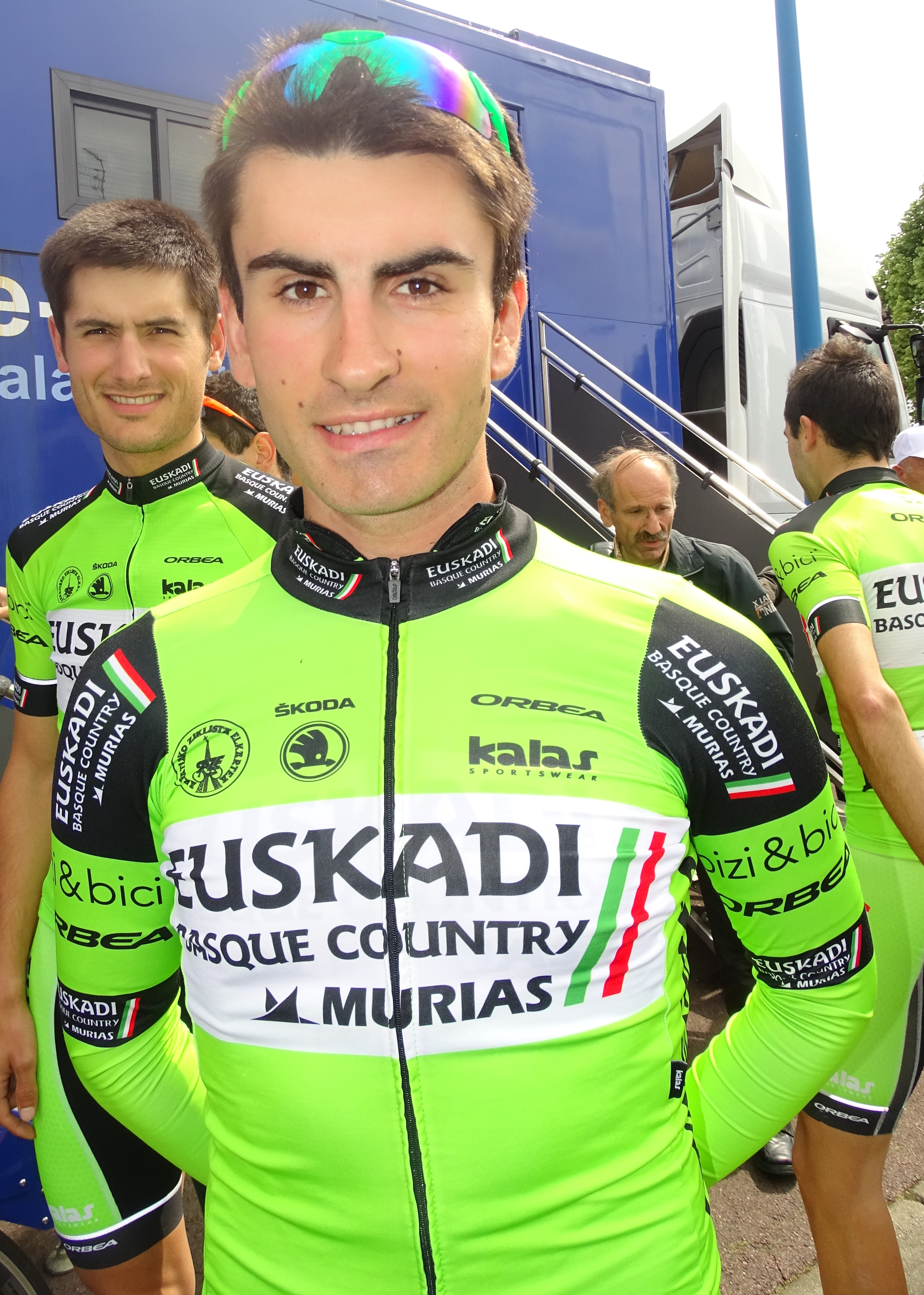
- Udondo in 2016

Personal information
- Full name: Gotzon Udondo Santamaria
- Born: 1 December 1993 (age 32) Berango, Spain
- Height: 1.79 m (5 ft 10 in)
- Weight: 69 kg (152 lb)

Cycling career
- Sport: Cycling
- Discipline: Road
- Role: Rider

Amateur teams
- 2012–2014: Seguros Bilbao
- 2015: Café Baqué–Conservas Campos

Professional team
- 2016–2019: Euskadi Basque Country–Murias

Gotzon Udondo Santamaria (born 1 December 1993) is a Spanish cyclist, who last rode for UCI Professional Continental team Euskadi–Murias.
