= 2025 Arkéa–B&B Hotels (men's team) season =

Arkéa–B&B Hotels
- 2025 season
- UCI code: BSE
- Status: UCI WorldTeam
- Manager: Emmanuel Hubert (FRA); Didier Rous (FRA)
- Main sponsor(s): Arkea; B&B Hotels
- Based: France

Season victories
- One-day races: 1
- Stage race overall: 3
- Stage race stages: 5
- Most wins: (France) Kévin Vauquelin (5)

The 2025 season for the Arkéa–B&B Hotels team is the team's 22nd season in existence, the third as a UCI WorldTeam.

== Team roster ==
All ages are as of 1 January 2025, the first day of the 2025 season.

As of 5 January 2025.

Rider	Date of birth
Jenthe Biermans (BEL)	30 October 1995 (aged 29)
Amaury Capiot (BEL)	25 June 1993 (aged 31)
Ewen Costiou (FRA)	10 November 2002 (aged 22)
Anthony Delaplace (FRA)	11 September 1989 (aged 35)
Arnaud Démare (FRA)	26 August 1991 (aged 33)
Giosuè Epis (ITA)	4 March 2002 (aged 22)
Raúl García Pierna (ESP)	23 February 2001 (aged 23)
Élie Gesbert (FRA)	1 July 1995 (aged 29)
Donavan Grondin (FRA)	26 September 2000 (aged 24)
Thibault Guernalec (FRA)	31 July 1997 (aged 27)
Victor Guernalec (FRA)	16 March 2000 (aged 24)
Simon Guglielmi (FRA)	1 July 1997 (aged 27)
Laurens Huys (BEL)	28 September 1998 (aged 26)
Mathis Le Berre (FRA)	16 April 2001 (aged 23)

Rider	Date of birth
Léandre Lozouet (FRA)	3 September 2004 (aged 20)
Luca Mozzato (ITA)	15 February 1998 (aged 26)
Michel Ries (LUX)	11 March 1998 (aged 26)
Cristián Rodríguez (ESP)	3 March 1995 (aged 29)
Louis Rouland (FRA)	21 October 2002 (aged 22)
Miles Scotson (AUS)	18 January 1994 (aged 30)
Florian Sénéchal (FRA)	10 July 1993 (aged 31)
Embret Svestad-Bårdseng (NOR)	1 September 2002 (aged 22)
Pierre Thierry (FRA)	31 May 2003 (aged 21)
Martin Tjøtta (NOR)	27 January 2001 (aged 23)
Kevin Vauquelin (FRA)	26 April 2001 (aged 23)
Clément Venturini (FRA)	16 October 1993 (aged 31)
Alessandro Verre (ITA)	17 November 2001 (aged 23)

== Season victories ==
Date	Race	Competition	Rider	Country	Location	Ref.
8 February	Étoile de Bessèges, stage 4	UCI Europe Tour	Kévin Vauquelin (FRA)	France	Le Mont Bouquet	
9 February	Étoile de Bessèges, stage 5 (ITT)	UCI Europe Tour	Kévin Vauquelin (FRA)	France	L'Hermitage	
9 February	Étoile de Bessèges, overall	UCI Europe Tour	Kévin Vauquelin (FRA)	France		
9 April	Région Pays de la Loire Tour, stage 2	UCI Europe Tour	Victor Guernalec (FRA)	France	Beaupréau-en-Mauges	
11 April	Région Pays de la Loire Tour, stage 4	UCI Europe Tour	Kévin Vauquelin (FRA)	France	Le Mans	
11 April	Région Pays de la Loire Tour, overall	UCI Europe Tour	Kévin Vauquelin (FRA)	France		
26 May	Mercan'Tour Classic	UCI Europe Tour	Cristián Rodríguez (ESP)	France	Valberg	
18 June	Route d'Occitanie, stage 1 (ITT)	UCI Europe Tour	Raúl García Pierna (ESP)	France	Roquefort-sur-Soulzon	
22 August	Tour du Limousin, overall	UCI Europe Tour	Ewen Costiou (FRA)	France		
