= List of teams and cyclists in the 2019 Tour de France =

List of cyclists

The number of riders per nation that participated in the 2019 Tour de France: 20+ / 10–19 / 2–9 / 1

The following is a list of teams and cyclists that took part in the 2019 Tour de France.

== Teams ==
The 18 UCI WorldTeams are automatically invited to the race. Additionally, the organisers of the Tour, the Amaury Sport Organisation (ASO), invited four second-tier UCI Professional Continental teams to participate in the event. The three French teams and one Belgian team have each participated in the race before.

UCI WorldTeams

The teams entering the race will be:

- AG2R La Mondiale
- Astana
- Bahrain–Merida
- Bora–Hansgrohe
- CCC Team
- Deceuninck–Quick-Step
- EF Education First
- Groupama–FDJ
- Lotto–Soudal
- Mitchelton–Scott
- Movistar Team
- Team Dimension Data
- Team Ineos
- Team Jumbo–Visma
- Team Katusha–Alpecin
- Team Sunweb
- Trek–Segafredo
- UAE Team Emirates

UCI Professional Continental teams

- Cofidis
- Wanty–Gobert
- Total Direct Énergie
- Arkéa–Samsic

== Cyclists ==
Legend
| No. | Starting number worn by the rider during the Tour |
| Pos. | Position in the general classification |
| Time | Deficit to the winner of the general classification |
| ‡ | Denotes riders born on or after 1 January 1994 eligible for the young rider classification |
| General classification | Denotes the winner of the general classification |
| Points classification | Denotes the winner of the points classification |
| Mountains classification | Denotes the winner of the mountains classification |
| Young rider classification | Denotes the winner of the young rider classification (eligibility indicated by ‡) |
| Team classification | Denotes riders that represent the winner of the team classification |
| Super-combativity award | Denotes the winner of the super-combativity award |
| DNS | Denotes a rider who did not start a stage, followed by the stage before which he withdrew |
| DNF | Denotes a rider who did not finish a stage, followed by the stage in which he withdrew |
| DSQ | Denotes a rider who was disqualified from the race, followed by the stage in which this occurred |
| HD | Denotes a rider finished outside the time limit, followed by the stage in which they did so |
Age correct as of Saturday 6 July 2019, the date on which the Tour began

=== By starting number ===
| No. | Name | Nationality | Team | Age | Pos. | Time | Ref. |
|---|---|---|---|---|---|---|---|
| 1 | Geraint Thomas | Great Britain | Team Ineos | 33 | 2 | + 1' 11" | |
| 2 | Egan Bernal ‡ | Colombia | Team Ineos | 22 | 1 | 79h 52' 52" | |
| 3 | Jonathan Castroviejo | Spain | Team Ineos | 32 | 50 | + 1h 54' 22" | |
| 4 | Michał Kwiatkowski | Poland | Team Ineos | 29 | 83 | + 2h 46' 14" | |
| 5 | Gianni Moscon ‡ | Italy | Team Ineos | 25 | 84 | + 2h 47' 23" | |
| 6 | Wout Poels | Netherlands | Team Ineos | 31 | 26 | + 1h 12' 25" | |
| 7 | Luke Rowe | Great Britain | Team Ineos | 29 | DSQ-17 | – | |
| 8 | Dylan van Baarle | Netherlands | Team Ineos | 27 | 46 | + 1h 51' 39" | |
| 11 | Peter Sagan | Slovakia | Bora–Hansgrohe | 29 | 82 | + 2h 44' 24" | |
| 12 | Emanuel Buchmann | Germany | Bora–Hansgrohe | 26 | 4 | + 1' 56" | |
| 13 | Marcus Burghardt | Germany | Bora–Hansgrohe | 36 | 141 | + 4h 02' 18" | |
| 14 | Patrick Konrad | Austria | Bora–Hansgrohe | 27 | 35 | + 1h 24' 35" | |
| 15 | Gregor Mühlberger ‡ | Austria | Bora–Hansgrohe | 25 | 25 | + 1h 04' 40" | |
| 16 | Daniel Oss | Italy | Bora–Hansgrohe | 32 | 89 | + 2h 54' 57" | |
| 17 | Lukas Pöstlberger | Austria | Bora–Hansgrohe | 27 | DNS-18 | – | |
| 18 | Maximilian Schachmann ‡ | Germany | Bora–Hansgrohe | 25 | DNS-14 | – | |
| 21 | Julian Alaphilippe | France | Deceuninck–Quick-Step | 27 | 5 | + 4' 05" | |
| 22 | Kasper Asgreen ‡ | Denmark | Deceuninck–Quick-Step | 24 | 122 | + 3h 38' 18" | |
| 23 | Dries Devenyns | Belgium | Deceuninck–Quick-Step | 35 | 97 | + 3h 02' 42" | |
| 24 | Yves Lampaert | Belgium | Deceuninck–Quick-Step | 28 | 133 | + 3h 54' 37" | |
| 25 | Enric Mas ‡ | Spain | Deceuninck–Quick-Step | 24 | 22 | + 58' 20" | |
| 26 | Michael Mørkøv | Denmark | Deceuninck–Quick-Step | 34 | 152 | + 4h 19' 33" | |
| 27 | Maximiliano Richeze | Argentina | Deceuninck–Quick-Step | 36 | 149 | + 4h 10' 05" | |
| 28 | Elia Viviani | Italy | Deceuninck–Quick-Step | 30 | 130 | + 3h 52' 57" | |
| 31 | Romain Bardet | France | AG2R La Mondiale | 28 | 15 | + 30' 28" | |
| 32 | Mickaël Chérel | France | AG2R La Mondiale | 33 | 34 | + 1h 22' 32" | |
| 33 | Benoît Cosnefroy ‡ | France | AG2R La Mondiale | 23 | 113 | + 3h 25' 57" | |
| 34 | Mathias Frank | Switzerland | AG2R La Mondiale | 32 | 48 | + 1h 53' 51" | |
| 35 | Tony Gallopin | France | AG2R La Mondiale | 31 | 56 | + 2h 03' 00" | |
| 36 | Alexis Gougeard | France | AG2R La Mondiale | 26 | 115 | + 3h 27' 10" | |
| 37 | Oliver Naesen | Belgium | AG2R La Mondiale | 28 | 69 | + 2h 19' 13" | |
| 38 | Alexis Vuillermoz | France | AG2R La Mondiale | 31 | 41 | + 1h 40' 12" | |
| 41 | Vincenzo Nibali | Italy | Bahrain–Merida | 34 | 39 | + 1h 37' 02" | |
| 42 | Damiano Caruso | Italy | Bahrain–Merida | 31 | 58 | + 2h 07' 16" | |
| 43 | Sonny Colbrelli | Italy | Bahrain–Merida | 29 | 85 | + 2h 48' 27" | |
| 44 | Rohan Dennis | Australia | Bahrain–Merida | 29 | DNF-12 | – | |
| 45 | Iván García Cortina ‡ | Spain | Bahrain–Merida | 23 | 114 | + 2h 26' 03" | |
| 46 | Matej Mohorič ‡ | Slovenia | Bahrain–Merida | 24 | 119 | + 3h 33' 43" | |
| 47 | Dylan Teuns | Belgium | Bahrain–Merida | 27 | 44 | + 1h 44' 17" | |
| 48 | Jan Tratnik | Slovenia | Bahrain–Merida | 29 | 93 | + 3h 00' 37" | |
| 51 | Thibaut Pinot | France | Groupama–FDJ | 29 | DNF-19 | – | |
| 52 | William Bonnet | France | Groupama–FDJ | 37 | 143 | + 4h 05' 32" | |
| 53 | David Gaudu ‡ | France | Groupama–FDJ | 22 | 13 | + 24' 03" | |
| 54 | Stefan Küng | Switzerland | Groupama–FDJ | 25 | 96 | + 3h 02' 38" | |
| 55 | Matthieu Ladagnous | France | Groupama–FDJ | 34 | 126 | + 3h 45' 11" | |
| 56 | Rudy Molard | France | Groupama–FDJ | 29 | 33 | + 1h 21' 17" | |
| 57 | Sébastien Reichenbach | Switzerland | Groupama–FDJ | 30 | 17 | + 44' 29" | |
| 58 | Anthony Roux | France | Groupama–FDJ | 32 | 102 | + 3h 08' 49" | |
| 61 | Nairo Quintana | Colombia | Movistar Team | 29 | 8 | + 5' 30" | |
| 62 | Alejandro Valverde | Spain | Movistar Team | 39 | 9 | + 6' 12" | |
| 63 | Andrey Amador | Costa Rica | Movistar Team | 32 | 55 | + 1h 59' 55" | |
| 64 | Imanol Erviti | Spain | Movistar Team | 35 | 99 | + 3h 04' 34" | |
| 65 | Mikel Landa | Spain | Movistar Team | 29 | 6 | + 4' 23" | |
| 66 | Nelson Oliveira | Portugal | Movistar Team | 30 | 79 | + 2h 35' 51" | |
| 67 | Marc Soler | Spain | Movistar Team | 25 | 37 | + 1h 35' 45" | |
| 68 | Carlos Verona | Spain | Movistar Team | 26 | 105 | + 3h 13' 05" | |
| 71 | Jakob Fuglsang | Denmark | Astana | 34 | DNF-16 | – | |
| 72 | Pello Bilbao | Spain | Astana | 29 | 54 | + 1h 59' 10" | |
| 73 | Omar Fraile | Spain | Astana | 28 | 71 | + 2h 19' 52" | |
| 74 | Hugo Houle | Canada | Astana | 28 | 91 | + 2h 56' 11" | |
| 75 | Gorka Izagirre | Spain | Astana | 31 | 42 | + 1h 40' 17" | |
| 76 | Alexey Lutsenko | Kazakhstan | Astana | 26 | 19 | + 48' 52" | |
| 77 | Magnus Cort Nielsen | Denmark | Astana | 26 | 104 | + 3h 12' 22" | |
| 78 | Luis León Sánchez | Spain | Astana | 35 | DNS-17 | – | |
| 81 | Steven Kruijswijk | Netherlands | Team Jumbo–Visma | 32 | 3 | + 1' 31" | |
| 82 | George Bennett | New Zealand | Team Jumbo–Visma | 29 | 24 | + 1h 04' 40" | |
| 83 | Laurens De Plus ‡ | Belgium | Team Jumbo–Visma | 23 | 23 | + 1h 02' 44" | |
| 84 | Dylan Groenewegen | Netherlands | Team Jumbo–Visma | 26 | 145 | + 4h 07' 10" | |
| 85 | Amund Grøndahl Jansen ‡ | Norway | Team Jumbo–Visma | 25 | 140 | + 4h 02' 02" | |
| 86 | Tony Martin | Germany | Team Jumbo–Visma | 34 | DSQ-17 | – | |
| 87 | Mike Teunissen | Netherlands | Team Jumbo–Visma | 26 | 101 | + 3h 06' 54" | |
| 88 | Wout van Aert ‡ | Belgium | Team Jumbo–Visma | 24 | DNF-13 | – | |
| 91 | Rigoberto Urán | Colombia | EF Education First | 32 | 7 | + 5' 15" | |
| 92 | Alberto Bettiol | Italy | EF Education First | 25 | 68 | + 2h 19' 06" | |
| 93 | Simon Clarke | Australia | EF Education First | 32 | 61 | + 2h 11' 43" | |
| 94 | Tanel Kangert | Estonia | EF Education First | 32 | 27 | + 1h 12' 36" | |
| 95 | Sebastian Langeveld | Netherlands | EF Education First | 34 | 155 | + 4h 34' 23" | |
| 96 | Tom Scully | New Zealand | EF Education First | 29 | 135 | + 3h 56' 52" | |
| 97 | Tejay van Garderen | United States | EF Education First | 30 | DNS-8 | – | |
| 98 | Michael Woods | Canada | EF Education First | 32 | 32 | + 1h 21' 00" | |
| 101 | Adam Yates | Great Britain | Mitchelton–Scott | 26 | 29 | + 1h 16' 50" | |
| 102 | Luke Durbridge | Australia | Mitchelton–Scott | 28 | 109 | + 3h 18' 36" | |
| 103 | Jack Haig | Australia | Mitchelton–Scott | 25 | 38 | + 1h 36' 59" | |
| 104 | Michael Hepburn | Australia | Mitchelton–Scott | 27 | 146 | + 4h 07' 32" | |
| 105 | Daryl Impey | South Africa | Mitchelton–Scott | 34 | 72 | + 2h 24' 58" | |
| 106 | Christopher Juul-Jensen | Denmark | Mitchelton–Scott | 30 | 112 | + 3h 22' 22" | |
| 107 | Matteo Trentin | Italy | Mitchelton–Scott | 29 | 52 | + 1h 57' 38" | |
| 108 | Simon Yates | Great Britain | Mitchelton–Scott | 26 | 49 | + 1h 53' 54" | |
| 111 | Greg Van Avermaet | Belgium | CCC Team | 34 | 36 | + 1h 27' 56" | |
| 112 | Patrick Bevin | New Zealand | CCC Team | 28 | DNS-6 | – | |
| 113 | Alessandro De Marchi | Italy | CCC Team | 33 | DNF-9 | – | |
| 114 | Simon Geschke | Germany | CCC Team | 33 | 63 | + 2h 13' 25" | |
| 115 | Serge Pauwels | Belgium | CCC Team | 35 | 77 | + 2h 32' 14" | |
| 116 | Joey Rosskopf | United States | CCC Team | 29 | 73 | + 2h 26' 36" | |
| 117 | Michael Schär | Switzerland | CCC Team | 32 | 70 | + 2h 19' 45" | |
| 118 | Łukasz Wiśniowski | Poland | CCC Team | 27 | 127 | + 3h 46' 34" | |
| 121 | Daniel Martin | Ireland | UAE Team Emirates | 32 | 18 | + 45' 21" | |
| 122 | Fabio Aru | Italy | UAE Team Emirates | 29 | 14 | + 27' 41" | |
| 123 | Sven Erik Bystrøm | Norway | UAE Team Emirates | 27 | 110 | + 3h 19' 40" | |
| 124 | Rui Costa | Portugal | UAE Team Emirates | 32 | 53 | + 1h 59' 02" | |
| 125 | Sergio Henao | Colombia | UAE Team Emirates | 31 | 47 | + 1h 52' 37" | |
| 126 | Alexander Kristoff | Norway | UAE Team Emirates | 32 | 139 | + 4h 01' 05" | |
| 127 | Vegard Stake Laengen | Norway | UAE Team Emirates | 30 | 107 | + 3h 15' 24" | |
| 128 | Jasper Philipsen ‡ | Belgium | UAE Team Emirates | 21 | DNS-12 | – | |
| 131 | Richie Porte | Australia | Trek–Segafredo | 34 | 11 | + 12' 43" | |
| 132 | Julien Bernard | France | Trek–Segafredo | 27 | 30 | + 1h 20' 07" | |
| 133 | Giulio Ciccone ‡ | Italy | Trek–Segafredo | 24 | 31 | + 1h 20' 49" | |
| 134 | Koen de Kort | Netherlands | Trek–Segafredo | 36 | 125 | + 3h 44' 48" | |
| 135 | Fabio Felline | Italy | Trek–Segafredo | 29 | 65 | + 2h 15' 03" | |
| 136 | Bauke Mollema | Netherlands | Trek–Segafredo | 32 | 28 | + 1h 14' 58" | |
| 137 | Toms Skujiņš | Latvia | Trek–Segafredo | 28 | 81 | + 2h 39' 50" | |
| 138 | Jasper Stuyven | Belgium | Trek–Segafredo | 27 | 43 | + 1h 43' 42" | |
| 141 | Michael Matthews | Australia | Team Sunweb | 28 | 67 | + 2h 16' 34" | |
| 142 | Nikias Arndt | Germany | Team Sunweb | 27 | 116 | + 3h 27' 43" | |
| 143 | Cees Bol ‡ | Netherlands | Team Sunweb | 23 | DNS-17 | – | |
| 144 | Chad Haga | United States | Team Sunweb | 30 | 134 | + 3h 54' 51" | |
| 145 | Lennard Kämna ‡ | Germany | Team Sunweb | 22 | 40 | + 1h 39' 36" | |
| 146 | Wilco Kelderman | Netherlands | Team Sunweb | 28 | DNS-16 | – | |
| 147 | Søren Kragh Andersen ‡ | Denmark | Team Sunweb | 24 | DNS-18 | – | |
| 148 | Nicolas Roche | Ireland | Team Sunweb | 35 | 45 | + 1h 47' 20" | |
| 151 | Christophe Laporte | France | Cofidis | 26 | DNF-8 | – | |
| 152 | Natnael Berhane | Eritrea | Cofidis | 28 | 86 | + 2h 49' 25" | |
| 153 | Nicolas Edet | France | Cofidis | 31 | DNF-6 | – | |
| 154 | Jesús Herrada | Spain | Cofidis | 28 | 20 | + 51' 57" | |
| 155 | Anthony Perez | France | Cofidis | 28 | 87 | + 2h 51' 36" | |
| 156 | Pierre-Luc Périchon | France | Cofidis | 32 | 57 | + 2h 05' 35" | |
| 157 | Stéphane Rossetto | France | Cofidis | 32 | 100 | + 3h 05' 15" | |
| 158 | Julien Simon | France | Cofidis | 33 | 108 | + 3h 17' 08" | |
| 161 | Caleb Ewan ‡ | Australia | Lotto–Soudal | 24 | 132 | + 3h 54' 34" | |
| 162 | Tiesj Benoot ‡ | Belgium | Lotto–Soudal | 25 | 59 | + 2h 07' 33" | |
| 163 | Jasper De Buyst | Belgium | Lotto–Soudal | 25 | 118 | + 3h 31' 36" | |
| 164 | Thomas De Gendt | Belgium | Lotto–Soudal | 32 | 60 | + 2h 10' 33" | |
| 165 | Jens Keukeleire | Belgium | Lotto–Soudal | 30 | 98 | + 3h 03' 49" | |
| 166 | Roger Kluge | Germany | Lotto–Soudal | 33 | 150 | + 4h 13' 43" | |
| 167 | Maxime Monfort | Belgium | Lotto–Soudal | 36 | 142 | + 4h 03' 56" | |
| 168 | Tim Wellens | Belgium | Lotto–Soudal | 28 | 94 | + 3h 01' 43" | |
| 171 | Lilian Calmejane | France | Total Direct Énergie | 26 | 106 | + 3h 13' 36" | |
| 172 | Niccolò Bonifazio | Italy | Total Direct Énergie | 25 | 137 | + 3h 59' 44" | |
| 173 | Fabien Grellier ‡ | France | Total Direct Énergie | 24 | 121 | + 3h 35' 12" | |
| 174 | Paul Ourselin ‡ | France | Total Direct Énergie | 25 | 95 | + 3h 01' 47" | |
| 175 | Romain Sicard | France | Total Direct Énergie | 31 | 80 | + 2h 38' 26" | |
| 176 | Rein Taaramäe | Estonia | Total Direct Énergie | 32 | 66 | + 2h 15' 42" | |
| 177 | Niki Terpstra | Netherlands | Total Direct Énergie | 35 | DNF-11 | – | |
| 178 | Anthony Turgis ‡ | France | Total Direct Énergie | 25 | 131 | + 3h 53' 11" | |
| 181 | Ilnur Zakarin | Russia | Team Katusha–Alpecin | 29 | 51 | + 1h 55' 57" | |
| 182 | Jens Debusschere | Belgium | Team Katusha–Alpecin | 29 | 153 | + 4h 29' 07" | |
| 183 | Alex Dowsett | Great Britain | Team Katusha–Alpecin | 30 | 151 | + 4h 14' 39" | |
| 184 | José Gonçalves | Portugal | Team Katusha–Alpecin | 30 | 128 | + 3h 47' 15" | |
| 185 | Marco Haller | Austria | Team Katusha–Alpecin | 28 | 148 | + 4h 08' 17" | |
| 186 | Nils Politt ‡ | Germany | Team Katusha–Alpecin | 25 | 64 | + 2h 14' 28" | |
| 187 | Mads Würtz Schmidt ‡ | Denmark | Team Katusha–Alpecin | 25 | 117 | + 3h 29' 22" | |
| 188 | Rick Zabel | Germany | Team Katusha–Alpecin | 25 | DNS-11 | – | |
| 191 | Guillaume Martin | France | Wanty–Gobert | 26 | 12 | + 22' 08" | |
| 192 | Frederik Backaert | Belgium | Wanty–Gobert | 29 | 120 | + 3h 34' 00" | |
| 193 | Aimé De Gendt ‡ | Belgium | Wanty–Gobert | 25 | 136 | + 3h 57' 05" | |
| 194 | Odd Christian Eiking ‡ | Norway | Wanty–Gobert | 24 | 111 | + 3h 19' 58" | |
| 195 | Xandro Meurisse | Belgium | Wanty–Gobert | 27 | 21 | + 56' 47" | |
| 196 | Yoann Offredo | France | Wanty–Gobert | 32 | 154 | + 4h 31' 43" | |
| 197 | Andrea Pasqualon | Italy | Wanty–Gobert | 31 | 88 | + 2h 53' 25" | |
| 198 | Kevin Van Melsen | Belgium | Wanty–Gobert | 32 | 138 | + 4h 00' 20" | |
| 201 | Edvald Boasson Hagen | Norway | Team Dimension Data | 32 | 76 | + 2h 28' 19" | |
| 202 | Lars Bak | Denmark | Team Dimension Data | 39 | 147 | + 4h 07' 49" | |
| 203 | Steve Cummings | Great Britain | Team Dimension Data | 38 | 129 | + 3h 49' 45" | |
| 204 | Reinardt Janse Van Rensburg | South Africa | Team Dimension Data | 30 | 124 | + 3h 44' 10" | |
| 205 | Ben King | United States | Team Dimension Data | 30 | 62 | + 2h 12' 00" | |
| 206 | Roman Kreuziger | Czech Republic | Team Dimension Data | 33 | 16 | + 36' 09" | |
| 207 | Giacomo Nizzolo | Italy | Team Dimension Data | 30 | DNF-12 | – | |
| 208 | Michael Valgren | Denmark | Team Dimension Data | 27 | 75 | + 2h 28' 07" | |
| 211 | Warren Barguil | France | Arkéa–Samsic | 27 | 10 | + 7' 32" | |
| 212 | Maxime Bouet | France | Arkéa–Samsic | 32 | 74 | + 2h 28' 04" | |
| 213 | Anthony Delaplace | France | Arkéa–Samsic | 29 | 90 | + 2h 55' 03" | |
| 214 | Élie Gesbert ‡ | France | Arkéa–Samsic | 24 | 78 | + 2h 33' 02" | |
| 215 | André Greipel | Germany | Arkéa–Samsic | 36 | 144 | + 4h 07' 00" | |
| 216 | Kévin Ledanois | France | Arkéa–Samsic | 25 | 103 | + 3h 12' 17" | |
| 217 | Amaël Moinard | France | Arkéa–Samsic | 37 | 92 | + 2h 59' 17" | |
| 218 | Florian Vachon | France | Arkéa–Samsic | 34 | 123 | + 3h 43' 22" | |

=== By team ===
Team Ineos (INS)
| No. | Rider | Pos. |
|---|---|---|
| 1 | Geraint Thomas (GBR) | 2 |
| 2 | Egan Bernal (COL) | 1 |
| 3 | Jonathan Castroviejo (ESP) | 50 |
| 4 | Michał Kwiatkowski (POL) | 83 |
| 5 | Gianni Moscon (ITA) | 84 |
| 6 | Wout Poels (NED) | 26 |
| 7 | Luke Rowe (GBR) | DSQ-17 |
| 8 | Dylan van Baarle (NED) | 46 |
Directeur sportif: Nicolas Portal/Servais Knaven

Bora–Hansgrohe (BOH)
| No. | Rider | Pos. |
|---|---|---|
| 11 | Peter Sagan (SVK) | 82 |
| 12 | Emanuel Buchmann (GER) | 4 |
| 13 | Marcus Burghardt (GER) | 141 |
| 14 | Patrick Konrad (AUT) | 35 |
| 15 | Gregor Mühlberger (AUT) | 25 |
| 16 | Daniel Oss (ITA) | 89 |
| 17 | Lukas Pöstlberger (AUT) | DNS-18 |
| 18 | Maximilian Schachmann (GER) | DNS-14 |
Directeur sportif: Enrico Poitschke/Patxi Vila

Deceuninck–Quick-Step (DQT)
| No. | Rider | Pos. |
|---|---|---|
| 21 | Julian Alaphilippe (FRA) | 5 |
| 22 | Kasper Asgreen (DEN) | 122 |
| 23 | Dries Devenyns (BEL) | 97 |
| 24 | Yves Lampaert (BEL) | 133 |
| 25 | Enric Mas (ESP) | 22 |
| 26 | Michael Mørkøv (DEN) | 152 |
| 27 | Maximiliano Richeze (ARG) | 149 |
| 28 | Elia Viviani (ITA) | 130 |
Directeur sportif: Brian Holm/Davide Bramati

AG2R La Mondiale (ALM)
| No. | Rider | Pos. |
|---|---|---|
| 31 | Romain Bardet (FRA) | 15 |
| 32 | Mickaël Chérel (FRA) | 34 |
| 33 | Benoît Cosnefroy (FRA) | 113 |
| 34 | Mathias Frank (SUI) | 48 |
| 35 | Tony Gallopin (FRA) | 56 |
| 36 | Alexis Gougeard (FRA) | 115 |
| 37 | Oliver Naesen (BEL) | 69 |
| 38 | Alexis Vuillermoz (FRA) | 41 |
Directeur sportif: Vincent Lavenu/Julien Jurdie

Bahrain–Merida (TBM)
| No. | Rider | Pos. |
|---|---|---|
| 41 | Vincenzo Nibali (ITA) | 39 |
| 42 | Damiano Caruso (ITA) | 58 |
| 43 | Sonny Colbrelli (ITA) | 85 |
| 44 | Rohan Dennis (AUS) | DNF-12 |
| 45 | Iván García Cortina (ESP) | 114 |
| 46 | Matej Mohorič (SLO) | 119 |
| 47 | Dylan Teuns (BEL) | 44 |
| 48 | Jan Tratnik (SLO) | 93 |
Directeur sportif: Gorazd Štangelj/Rik Verbrugghe

Groupama–FDJ (GFC)
| No. | Rider | Pos. |
|---|---|---|
| 51 | Thibaut Pinot (FRA) | DNF-19 |
| 52 | William Bonnet (FRA) | 143 |
| 53 | David Gaudu (FRA) | 13 |
| 54 | Stefan Küng (SUI) | 96 |
| 55 | Matthieu Ladagnous (FRA) | 126 |
| 56 | Rudy Molard (FRA) | 33 |
| 57 | Sébastien Reichenbach (SUI) | 17 |
| 58 | Anthony Roux (FRA) | 102 |
Directeur sportif: Philippe Mauduit/Yvon Madiot

Movistar Team (MOV)
| No. | Rider | Pos. |
|---|---|---|
| 61 | Nairo Quintana (COL) | 8 |
| 62 | Alejandro Valverde (ESP) | 9 |
| 63 | Andrey Amador (CRC) | 55 |
| 64 | Imanol Erviti (ESP) | 99 |
| 65 | Mikel Landa (ESP) | 6 |
| 66 | Nelson Oliveira (POR) | 79 |
| 67 | Marc Soler (ESP) | 37 |
| 68 | Carlos Verona (ESP) | 105 |
Directeur sportif: José Luis Arrieta/José Vicente García

Astana (AST)
| No. | Rider | Pos. |
|---|---|---|
| 71 | Jakob Fuglsang (DEN) | DNF-16 |
| 72 | Pello Bilbao (ESP) | 54 |
| 73 | Omar Fraile (ESP) | 71 |
| 74 | Hugo Houle (CAN) | 91 |
| 75 | Gorka Izagirre (ESP) | 42 |
| 76 | Alexey Lutsenko (KAZ) | 19 |
| 77 | Magnus Cort Nielsen (DEN) | 104 |
| 78 | Luis León Sánchez (ESP) | DNS-17 |
Directeur sportif: Dmitry Fofonov/Bruno Cenghialta

Team Jumbo–Visma (TJV)
| No. | Rider | Pos. |
|---|---|---|
| 81 | Steven Kruijswijk (NED) | 3 |
| 82 | George Bennett (NZL) | 24 |
| 83 | Laurens De Plus (BEL) | 23 |
| 84 | Dylan Groenewegen (NED) | 145 |
| 85 | Amund Grøndahl Jansen (NOR) | 140 |
| 86 | Tony Martin (GER) | DSQ-17 |
| 87 | Mike Teunissen (NED) | 101 |
| 88 | Wout van Aert (BEL) | DNF-13 |
Directeur sportif: Nico Verhoeven/Frans Maassen

EF Education First (EF1)
| No. | Rider | Pos. |
|---|---|---|
| 91 | Rigoberto Urán (COL) | 7 |
| 92 | Alberto Bettiol (ITA) | 68 |
| 93 | Simon Clarke (AUS) | 61 |
| 94 | Tanel Kangert (EST) | 27 |
| 95 | Sebastian Langeveld (NED) | 155 |
| 96 | Tom Scully (NZL) | 135 |
| 97 | Tejay van Garderen (USA) | DNS-8 |
| 98 | Michael Woods (CAN) | 32 |
Directeur sportif: Charly Wegelius/Tom Southam

Mitchelton–Scott (MTS)
| No. | Rider | Pos. |
|---|---|---|
| 101 | Adam Yates (GBR) | 29 |
| 102 | Luke Durbridge (AUS) | 109 |
| 103 | Jack Haig (AUS) | 38 |
| 104 | Michael Hepburn (AUS) | 146 |
| 105 | Daryl Impey (SAF) | 72 |
| 106 | Christopher Juul-Jensen (DEN) | 112 |
| 107 | Matteo Trentin (ITA) | 52 |
| 108 | Simon Yates (GBR) | 49 |
Directeur sportif: Matthew White/David McPartland

CCC Team (CCC)
| No. | Rider | Pos. |
|---|---|---|
| 111 | Greg Van Avermaet (BEL) | 36 |
| 112 | Patrick Bevin (NZL) | DNS-6 |
| 113 | Alessandro De Marchi (ITA) | DNF-9 |
| 114 | Simon Geschke (GER) | 63 |
| 115 | Serge Pauwels (BEL) | 77 |
| 116 | Joey Rosskopf (USA) | 73 |
| 117 | Michael Schär (SUI) | 70 |
| 118 | Łukasz Wiśniowski (POL) | 127 |
Directeur sportif: Piotr Wadecki/Valerio Piva

UAE Team Emirates (UAD)
| No. | Rider | Pos. |
|---|---|---|
| 121 | Daniel Martin (IRL) | 18 |
| 122 | Fabio Aru (ITA) | 14 |
| 123 | Sven Erik Bystrøm (NOR) | 110 |
| 124 | Rui Costa (POR) | 53 |
| 125 | Sergio Henao (COL) | 47 |
| 126 | Alexander Kristoff (NOR) | 139 |
| 127 | Vegard Stake Laengen (NOR) | 107 |
| 128 | Jasper Philipsen (BEL) | DNS-12 |
Directeur sportif: José Antonio Fernandez/Simone Pedrazzini

Trek–Segafredo (TFS)
| No. | Rider | Pos. |
|---|---|---|
| 131 | Richie Porte (AUS) | 11 |
| 132 | Julien Bernard (FRA) | 30 |
| 133 | Giulio Ciccone (ITA) | 31 |
| 134 | Koen de Kort (NED) | 125 |
| 135 | Fabio Felline (ITA) | 65 |
| 136 | Bauke Mollema (NED) | 28 |
| 137 | Toms Skujiņš (LVA) | 81 |
| 138 | Jasper Stuyven (BEL) | 43 |
Directeur sportif: Steven de Jongh/Kim Andersen

Team Sunweb (SUN)
| No. | Rider | Pos. |
|---|---|---|
| 141 | Michael Matthews (AUS) | 67 |
| 142 | Nikias Arndt (GER) | 116 |
| 143 | Cees Bol (NED) | DNS-17 |
| 144 | Chad Haga (USA) | 134 |
| 145 | Lennard Kämna (GER) | 40 |
| 146 | Wilco Kelderman (NED) | DNS-16 |
| 147 | Søren Kragh Andersen (DEN) | DNS-18 |
| 148 | Nicolas Roche (IRL) | 45 |
Directeur sportif: Aike Visbeek/Luke Roberts

Cofidis (COF)
| No. | Rider | Pos. |
|---|---|---|
| 151 | Christophe Laporte (FRA) | DNF-8 |
| 152 | Natnael Berhane (ERI) | 86 |
| 153 | Nicolas Edet (FRA) | DNF-6 |
| 154 | Jesús Herrada (ESP) | 20 |
| 155 | Anthony Perez (FRA) | 87 |
| 156 | Pierre-Luc Périchon (FRA) | 57 |
| 157 | Stéphane Rossetto (FRA) | 100 |
| 158 | Julien Simon (FRA) | 108 |
Directeur sportif: Roberto Damiani/Jean-Luc Jonrond

Lotto–Soudal (LTS)
| No. | Rider | Pos. |
|---|---|---|
| 161 | Caleb Ewan (AUS) | 132 |
| 162 | Tiesj Benoot (BEL) | 59 |
| 163 | Jasper De Buyst (BEL) | 118 |
| 164 | Thomas De Gendt (BEL) | 60 |
| 165 | Jens Keukeleire (BEL) | 98 |
| 166 | Roger Kluge (GER) | 150 |
| 167 | Maxime Monfort (BEL) | 142 |
| 168 | Tim Wellens (BEL) | 94 |
Directeur sportif: Herman Frison/Marc Wauters

Total Direct Énergie (TDE)
| No. | Rider | Pos. |
|---|---|---|
| 171 | Lilian Calmejane (FRA) | 106 |
| 172 | Niccolò Bonifazio (ITA) | 139 |
| 173 | Fabien Grellier (FRA) | 121 |
| 174 | Paul Ourselin (FRA) | 95 |
| 175 | Romain Sicard (FRA) | 80 |
| 176 | Rein Taaramäe (EST) | 66 |
| 177 | Niki Terpstra (NED) | DNF-11 |
| 178 | Anthony Turgis (FRA) | 131 |
Directeur sportif: Lylian Lebreton/Dominique Arnould

Team Katusha–Alpecin (TKA)
| No. | Rider | Pos. |
|---|---|---|
| 181 | Ilnur Zakarin (RUS) | 51 |
| 182 | Jens Debusschere (BEL) | 153 |
| 183 | Alex Dowsett (GBR) | 151 |
| 184 | José Gonçalves (POR) | 128 |
| 185 | Marco Haller (AUT) | 148 |
| 186 | Nils Politt (GER) | 64 |
| 187 | Mads Würtz Schmidt (DEN) | 117 |
| 188 | Rick Zabel (GER) | DNS-11 |
Directeur sportif: José Azevedo/Dirk Demol

Wanty–Gobert (WGG)
| No. | Rider | Pos. |
|---|---|---|
| 191 | Guillaume Martin (FRA) | 12 |
| 192 | Frederik Backaert (BEL) | 120 |
| 193 | Aimé De Gendt (BEL) | 136 |
| 194 | Odd Christian Eiking (NOR) | 111 |
| 195 | Xandro Meurisse (BEL) | 21 |
| 196 | Yoann Offredo (FRA) | 154 |
| 197 | Andrea Pasqualon (ITA) | 88 |
| 198 | Kevin Van Melsen (BEL) | 138 |
Directeur sportif: Hilaire Van Der Schueren/Steven De Neef

Team Dimension Data (TDD)
| No. | Rider | Pos. |
|---|---|---|
| 201 | Edvald Boasson Hagen (NOR) | 76 |
| 202 | Lars Ytting Bak (DEN) | 147 |
| 203 | Steve Cummings (GBR) | 129 |
| 204 | Reinardt Janse Van Rensburg (SAF) | 124 |
| 205 | Ben King (USA) | 62 |
| 206 | Roman Kreuziger (CZE) | 16 |
| 207 | Giacomo Nizzolo (ITA) | DNF-12 |
| 208 | Michael Valgren (DEN) | 75 |
Directeur sportif: Jean-Pierre Heynderickx/Gino Vanoudenhove

Arkéa–Samsic (PCB)
| No. | Rider | Pos. |
|---|---|---|
| 211 | Warren Barguil (FRA) | 10 |
| 212 | Maxime Bouet (FRA) | 74 |
| 213 | Anthony Delaplace (FRA) | 90 |
| 214 | Élie Gesbert (FRA) | 78 |
| 215 | André Greipel (GER) | 144 |
| 216 | Kévin Ledanois (FRA) | 103 |
| 217 | Amaël Moinard (FRA) | 92 |
| 218 | Florian Vachon (FRA) | 123 |
Directeur sportif: Yvon Ledanois/Sébastien Hinault

=== By nationality ===
The 176 riders that are competing in the 2019 Tour de France originated from 30 different countries.

| Country | No. of riders | Finishers | Stage wins |
|---|---|---|---|
| Argentina | 1 | 1 | |
| Australia | 8 | 7 | 3 (Caleb Ewan x3) |
| Austria | 4 | 3 | |
| Belgium | 21 | 19 | 3 (Dylan Teuns, Thomas De Gendt, Wout van Aert) |
| Canada | 2 | 2 | |
| Colombia | 4 | 4 | 1 (Nairo Quintana) |
| Costa Rica | 1 | 1 | |
| Czech Republic | 1 | 1 | |
| Denmark | 9 | 7 | |
| Eritrea | 1 | 1 | |
| Estonia | 2 | 2 | |
| France | 34 | 31 | 3 (Julian Alaphilippe x2, Thibaut Pinot) |
| Germany | 11 | 8 | |
| Great Britain | 6 | 5 | 2 (Simon Yates x2) |
| Ireland | 2 | 2 | |
| Italy | 15 | 13 | 3 (Elia Viviani, Matteo Trentin, Vincenzo Nibali) |
| Kazakhstan | 1 | 1 | |
| Latvia | 1 | 1 | |
| Netherlands | 11 | 8 | 2 (Mike Teunissen, Dylan Groenewegen) |
| New Zealand | 3 | 2 | |
| Norway | 6 | 6 | |
| Poland | 2 | 2 | |
| Portugal | 3 | 3 | |
| Russia | 1 | 1 | |
| Slovakia | 1 | 1 | 1 (Peter Sagan) |
| Slovenia | 2 | 2 | |
| South Africa | 2 | 2 | 1 (Daryl Impey) |
| Spain | 13 | 12 | |
| Switzerland | 4 | 4 | |
| United States | 4 | 3 | |
| Total | 176 | 155 | 19 |
