= 2021 Volta ao Algarve =

2021 UCI Europe Tour 2021 UCI ProSeries

Race details
- Dates: 5–9 May 2021 (Note: The race was originally scheduled for 17 to 21 February, but due to the COVID-19 pandemic, it had to be postponed and rescheduled.)
- Stages: 5
- Distance: 765.8 km (475.8 mi)
- Winning time: 19h 03' 56"

Results
Jersey awarded to the overall winner	Winner	João Rodrigues (POR)	(W52 / FC Porto)
	Second	Ethan Hayter (GBR)	(Ineos Grenadiers)
	Third	Kasper Asgreen (DEN)	(Deceuninck–Quick-Step)
Jersey awarded to the points classification winner	Points	Sam Bennett (IRL)	(Deceuninck–Quick-Step)
Jersey awarded to the mountains classification winner	Mountains	Luís Fernandes (POR)	(W52 / FC Porto)
Jersey awarded to the youth classification winner	Youth	Sean Quinn (USA)	(Hagens Berman Axeon)
	Team	W52 / FC Porto	

The 2021 Volta ao Algarve (English: Tour of the Algarve) was a road cycling stage race that took place in the Algarve region of Portugal between 5 and 9 May 2021. It was the 47th edition of the Volta ao Algarve and was a category 2.Pro event on the 2021 UCI Europe Tour and the 2021 UCI ProSeries calendars.

The race was originally scheduled for 17 to 21 February, but due to rising COVID-19 cases in Portugal leading up to the race, it had to be postponed to 5 to 9 May.

== Teams ==
Seven UCI WorldTeams, eight UCI ProTeams, and ten UCI Continental teams made up the twenty-five teams that participated in the race. With each team fielding seven riders, there were 175 starters, of which 153 riders finished the race.

UCI WorldTeams

- AG2R Citroën Team
- Bora–Hansgrohe
- Deceuninck–Quick-Step
- Groupama–FDJ
- Ineos Grenadiers
- Intermarché–Wanty–Gobert Matériaux
- UAE Team Emirates

UCI ProTeams

- Arkéa–Samsic
- Bingoal Pauwels Sauces WB
- Burgos BH
- Caja Rural–Seguros RGA
- Delko
- Equipo Kern Pharma
- Euskaltel–Euskadi
- Rally Cycling

UCI Continental Teams

- Antarte–Feirense
- Atum General / Tavira / Maria Nova Hotel
- Efapel
- Hagens Berman Axeon
- Kelly / Simoldes / UDO
- LA Alumínios / LA Sport
- Louletano–Loulé Concelho
- Rádio Popular–Boavista
- Tavfer–Measindot–Mortágua
- W52 / FC Porto

== Route ==
Stage characteristics and winners
Stage	Date	Course	Distance	Type	Stage winner
1	5 May	Lagos to Portimão	189.5 km (117.7 mi)	Flat stage	Sam Bennett (IRL)
2	6 May	Sagres to Fóia	182.8 km (113.6 mi)	Mountain stage	Ethan Hayter (GBR)
3	7 May	Faro to Tavira	203.1 km (126.2 mi)	Flat stage	Sam Bennett (IRL)
4	8 May	Lagoa to Lagoa	20.3 km (12.6 mi)	Individual time trial	Kasper Asgreen (DEN)
5	9 May	Albufeira to Alto do Malhão	170.1 km (105.7 mi)	Hilly stage	Élie Gesbert (FRA)
Total			765.8 km (475.8 mi)		

== Stages ==
=== Stage 1 ===
5 May 2021 – Lagos to Portimão, 189.5 km (117.7 mi)

Stage 1 Result
Rank	Rider	Team	Time
1	Sam Bennett (IRL)	Deceuninck–Quick-Step	4h 37' 41"
2	Danny van Poppel (NED)	Intermarché–Wanty–Gobert Matériaux	+ 0"
3	Jon Aberasturi (ESP)	Caja Rural–Seguros RGA	+ 0"
4	Stanisław Aniołkowski (POL)	Bingoal Pauwels Sauces WB	+ 0"
5	Iúri Leitão (POR)	Tavfer–Measindot–Mortágua	+ 0"
6	Michael Mørkøv (DEN)	Deceuninck–Quick-Step	+ 0"
7	Jarrad Drizners (AUS)	Hagens Berman Axeon	+ 0"
8	Rui Oliveira (POR)	UAE Team Emirates	+ 0"
9	Ethan Hayter (GBR)	Ineos Grenadiers	+ 0"
10	Mikel Aristi (ESP)	Euskaltel–Euskadi	+ 0"

General classification after Stage 1
Rank	Rider	Team	Time
1	Sam Bennett (IRL)	Deceuninck–Quick-Step	4h 37' 31"
2	Danny van Poppel (NED)	Intermarché–Wanty–Gobert Matériaux	+ 0"
3	Jon Aberasturi (ESP)	Caja Rural–Seguros RGA	+ 0"
4	Stanisław Aniołkowski (POL)	Bingoal Pauwels Sauces WB	+ 0"
5	Iúri Leitão (POR)	Tavfer–Measindot–Mortágua	+ 0"
6	Michael Mørkøv (DEN)	Deceuninck–Quick-Step	+ 0"
7	Jarrad Drizners (AUS)	Hagens Berman Axeon	+ 0"
8	Rui Oliveira (POR)	UAE Team Emirates	+ 0"
9	Ethan Hayter (GBR)	Ineos Grenadiers	+ 0"
10	Mikel Aristi (ESP)	Euskaltel–Euskadi	+ 0"

=== Stage 2 ===
6 May 2021 – Sagres to Fóia, 182.8 km (113.6 mi)

Stage 2 Result
Rank	Rider	Team	Time
1	Ethan Hayter (GBR)	Ineos Grenadiers	4h 48' 43"
2	João Rodrigues (POR)	W52 / FC Porto	+ 0"
3	Jonathan Lastra (ESP)	Caja Rural–Seguros RGA	+ 0"
4	Élie Gesbert (FRA)	Arkéa–Samsic	+ 4"
5	Iván Sosa (COL)	Ineos Grenadiers	+ 9"
6	Sebastián Henao (COL)	Ineos Grenadiers	+ 20"
7	Amaro Antunes (POR)	W52 / FC Porto	+ 30"
8	Odd Christian Eiking (NOR)	Intermarché–Wanty–Gobert Matériaux	+ 34"
9	Luís Fernandes (POR)	Rádio Popular–Boavista	+ 35"
10	Nicolas Prodhomme (FRA)	AG2R Citroën Team	+ 35"

General classification after Stage 2
Rank	Rider	Team	Time
1	Ethan Hayter (GBR)	Ineos Grenadiers	9h 26' 24"
2	João Rodrigues (POR)	W52 / FC Porto	+ 0"
3	Jonathan Lastra (ESP)	Caja Rural–Seguros RGA	+ 0"
4	Élie Gesbert (FRA)	Arkéa–Samsic	+ 4"
5	Iván Sosa (COL)	Ineos Grenadiers	+ 9"
6	Sebastián Henao (COL)	Ineos Grenadiers	+ 20"
7	Amaro Antunes (POR)	W52 / FC Porto	+ 30"
8	Odd Christian Eiking (NOR)	Intermarché–Wanty–Gobert Matériaux	+ 34"
9	Luís Fernandes (POR)	Rádio Popular–Boavista	+ 35"
10	Nicolas Prodhomme (FRA)	AG2R Citroën Team	+ 35"

=== Stage 3 ===
7 May 2021 – Faro to Tavira, 203.1 km (126.2 mi)

Stage 3 Result
Rank	Rider	Team	Time
1	Sam Bennett (IRL)	Deceuninck–Quick-Step	5h 02' 14"
2	Danny van Poppel (NED)	Intermarché–Wanty–Gobert Matériaux	+ 0"
3	Michael Mørkøv (DEN)	Deceuninck–Quick-Step	+ 0"
4	Jon Aberasturi (ESP)	Caja Rural–Seguros RGA	+ 0"
5	Pascal Ackermann (GER)	Bora–Hansgrohe	+ 0"
6	Eduard-Michael Grosu (ROU)	Delko	+ 0"
7	Thomas Boudat (FRA)	Arkéa–Samsic	+ 0"
8	Rui Oliveira (POR)	UAE Team Emirates	+ 0"
9	Iúri Leitão (POR)	Tavfer–Measindot–Mortágua	+ 2"
10	Ryan Gibbons (RSA)	UAE Team Emirates	+ 2"

General classification after Stage 3
Rank	Rider	Team	Time
1	Ethan Hayter (GBR)	Ineos Grenadiers	14h 28' 40"
2	João Rodrigues (POR)	W52 / FC Porto	+ 0"
3	Jonathan Lastra (ESP)	Caja Rural–Seguros RGA	+ 0"
4	Élie Gesbert (FRA)	Arkéa–Samsic	+ 4"
5	Iván Sosa (COL)	Ineos Grenadiers	+ 9"
6	Sebastián Henao (COL)	Ineos Grenadiers	+ 20"
7	Amaro Antunes (POR)	W52 / FC Porto	+ 30"
8	Odd Christian Eiking (NOR)	Intermarché–Wanty–Gobert Matériaux	+ 34"
9	Nicolas Prodhomme (FRA)	AG2R Citroën Team	+ 35"
10	Luís Fernandes (POR)	Rádio Popular–Boavista	+ 35"

=== Stage 4 ===
8 May 2021 – Lagoa to Lagoa, 20.3 km (12.6 mi) (ITT)

Stage 4 Result
Rank	Rider	Team	Time
1	Kasper Asgreen (DEN)	Deceuninck–Quick-Step	23' 52"
2	Rafael Reis (POR)	Efapel	+ 3"
3	Benjamin Thomas (FRA)	Groupama–FDJ	+ 9"
4	Thibault Guernalec (FRA)	Arkéa–Samsic	+ 19"
5	Nils Politt (GER)	Bora–Hansgrohe	+ 28"
6	Ivo Oliveira (POR)	UAE Team Emirates	+ 37"
7	Ryan Gibbons (RSA)	UAE Team Emirates	+ 52"
8	Diego López (ESP)	Equipo Kern Pharma	+ 53"
9	Ethan Hayter (GBR)	Ineos Grenadiers	+ 1' 02"
10	Carlos Rodríguez (ESP)	Ineos Grenadiers	+ 1' 12"

General classification after Stage 4
Rank	Rider	Team	Time
1	Ethan Hayter (GBR)	Ineos Grenadiers	14h 53' 34"
2	João Rodrigues (POR)	W52 / FC Porto	+ 12"
3	Kasper Asgreen (DEN)	Deceuninck–Quick-Step	+ 21"
4	Thibault Guernalec (FRA)	Arkéa–Samsic	+ 22"
5	Jonathan Lastra (ESP)	Caja Rural–Seguros RGA	+ 42"
6	Maxime Bouet (FRA)	Arkéa–Samsic	+ 53"
7	Élie Gesbert (FRA)	Arkéa–Samsic	+ 56"
8	Sebastián Henao (COL)	Ineos Grenadiers	+ 1' 18"
9	Sean Quinn (USA)	Hagens Berman Axeon	+ 1' 37"
10	Daniel Navarro (ESP)	Burgos BH	+ 1' 43"

=== Stage 5 ===
9 May 2021 – Albufeira to Alto do Malhão, 170.1 km (105.7 mi)

Stage 5 Result
Rank	Rider	Team	Time
1	Élie Gesbert (FRA)	Arkéa–Samsic	4h 10' 10"
2	João Rodrigues (POR)	W52 / FC Porto	+ 0"
3	Joni Brandão (POR)	W52 / FC Porto	+ 9"
4	Jonathan Lastra (ESP)	Caja Rural–Seguros RGA	+ 11"
5	Amaro Antunes (POR)	W52 / FC Porto	+ 15"
6	Joaquim Silva (POR)	Tavfer–Measindot–Mortágua	+ 17"
7	Nicolas Prodhomme (FRA)	AG2R Citroën Team	+ 17"
8	Kasper Asgreen (DEN)	Deceuninck–Quick-Step	+ 19"
9	Sebastián Henao (COL)	Ineos Grenadiers	+ 21"
10	Ethan Hayter (GBR)	Ineos Grenadiers	+ 21"

General classification after Stage 5
Rank	Rider	Team	Time
1	João Rodrigues (POR)	W52 / FC Porto	19h 03' 56"
2	Ethan Hayter (GBR)	Ineos Grenadiers	+ 9"
3	Kasper Asgreen (DEN)	Deceuninck–Quick-Step	+ 28"
4	Jonathan Lastra (ESP)	Caja Rural–Seguros RGA	+ 41"
5	Élie Gesbert (FRA)	Arkéa–Samsic	+ 44"
6	Thibault Guernalec (FRA)	Arkéa–Samsic	+ 48"
7	Maxime Bouet (FRA)	Arkéa–Samsic	+ 1' 13"
8	Sebastián Henao (COL)	Ineos Grenadiers	+ 1' 27"
9	Joni Brandão (POR)	W52 / FC Porto	+ 1' 40"
10	Daniel Navarro (ESP)	Burgos BH	+ 1' 54"

== Classification leadership table ==
Classification leadership by stage
Stage	Winner	General classification	Points classification	Mountains classification	Young rider classification	Team classification
1	Sam Bennett	Sam Bennett	Sam Bennett	Jon Irisarri	Jarrad Drizners	UAE Team Emirates
2	Ethan Hayter	Ethan Hayter	Sam Bennett	João Rodrigues	Sean Quinn	Ineos Grenadiers
3	Sam Bennett	Ethan Hayter	Sam Bennett	João Rodrigues	Sean Quinn	Ineos Grenadiers
4	Kasper Asgreen	Ethan Hayter	Sam Bennett	João Rodrigues	Sean Quinn	Ineos Grenadiers
5	Élie Gesbert	João Rodrigues	Sam Bennett	Luís Fernandes	Sean Quinn	W52 / FC Porto
Final		João Rodrigues	Sam Bennett	Luís Fernandes	Sean Quinn	W52 / FC Porto

- On stage 2, Danny van Poppel, who was second in the points classification, wore the green jersey, because first-placed Sam Bennett wore the yellow jersey as the leader of the general classification.

== Final classification standings ==
Legend
Denotes the winner of the general classification	Denotes the winner of the mountains classification
Denotes the winner of the points classification	Denotes the winner of the young rider classification

=== General classification ===
Final general classification (1–10)
Rank	Rider	Team	Time
1	João Rodrigues (POR)	W52 / FC Porto	19h 03' 56"
2	Ethan Hayter (GBR)	Ineos Grenadiers	+ 9"
3	Kasper Asgreen (DEN)	Deceuninck–Quick-Step	+ 28"
4	Jonathan Lastra (ESP)	Caja Rural–Seguros RGA	+ 41"
5	Élie Gesbert (FRA)	Arkéa–Samsic	+ 44"
6	Thibault Guernalec (FRA)	Arkéa–Samsic	+ 48"
7	Maxime Bouet (FRA)	Arkéa–Samsic	+ 1' 13"
8	Sebastián Henao (COL)	Ineos Grenadiers	+ 1' 27"
9	Joni Brandão (POR)	W52 / FC Porto	+ 1' 40"
10	Daniel Navarro (ESP)	Burgos BH	+ 1' 54"

=== Points classification ===
Final points classification (1–10)
Rank	Rider	Team	Points
1	Sam Bennett (IRL)	Deceuninck–Quick-Step	50
2	Jon Aberasturi (ESP)	Caja Rural–Seguros RGA	29
3	João Rodrigues (POR)	W52 / FC Porto	25
4	Michael Mørkøv (DEN)	Deceuninck–Quick-Step	24
5	Élie Gesbert (FRA)	Arkéa–Samsic	23
6	Ethan Hayter (GBR)	Ineos Grenadiers	18
7	Jonathan Lastra (ESP)	Caja Rural–Seguros RGA	18
8	Stanisław Aniołkowski (POL)	Bingoal Pauwels Sauces WB	13
9	Iúri Leitão (POR)	Tavfer–Measindot–Mortágua	12
10	Joni Brandão (POR)	W52 / FC Porto	10

=== Mountains classification ===
Final mountains classification (1–10)
Rank	Rider	Team	Points
1	Luís Fernandes (POR)	Rádio Popular–Boavista	16
2	João Rodrigues (POR)	W52 / FC Porto	15
3	Michael Schwarzmann (GER)	Bora–Hansgrohe	13
4	Ethan Hayter (GBR)	Ineos Grenadiers	10
5	Élie Gesbert (FRA)	Arkéa–Samsic	10
6	Kenny Molly (BEL)	Bingoal Pauwels Sauces WB	8
7	Jonathan Lastra (ESP)	Caja Rural–Seguros RGA	8
8	Javier Moreno (ESP)	Efapel	7
9	Henrique Casimiro (POR)	Kelly / Simoldes / UDO	7
10	Benjamin Thomas (FRA)	Groupama–FDJ	7

=== Young rider classification ===
Final young rider classification (1–10)
Rank	Rider	Team	Time
1	Sean Quinn (USA)	Hagens Berman Axeon	19h 06' 26"
2	Carlos Rodríguez (ESP)	Ineos Grenadiers	+ 3' 05"
3	Pedro Andrade (POR)	Hagens Berman Axeon	+ 5' 12"
4	Matthew Riccitello (USA)	Hagens Berman Axeon	+ 6' 34"
5	Diogo Barbosa (POR)	Hagens Berman Axeon	+ 13' 05"
6	Afonso Silva (POR)	Rádio Popular–Boavista	+ 13' 32"
7	Pedro Miguel Lopes (POR)	Kelly / Simoldes / UDO	+ 13' 46"
8	Carlos Canal (ESP)	Burgos BH	+ 15' 27"
9	Matis Louvel (FRA)	Arkéa–Samsic	+ 16' 58"
10	Jarrad Drizners (AUS)	Hagens Berman Axeon	+ 20' 23"

=== Team classification ===
Final team classification (1–10)
Rank	Team	Time
1	W52 / FC Porto	57h 13' 47"
2	Arkéa–Samsic	+ 14"
3	Ineos Grenadiers	+ 35"
4	Intermarché–Wanty–Gobert Matériaux	+ 10' 20"
5	Hagens Berman Axeon	+ 11' 20"
6	Kelly / Simoldes / UDO	+ 15' 22"
7	Delko	+ 17' 14"
8	Rádio Popular–Boavista	+ 18' 17"
9	Caja Rural–Seguros RGA	+ 18' 36"
10	Burgos BH	+ 21' 42"
