= Luís Fernandes (cyclist) =

Portuguese cyclist

Personal information
- Full name: Luís Filipe Silva Fernandes
- Born: 2 December 1987 (age 38) Lisbon, Portugal
- Height: 1.73 m (5 ft 8 in)
- Weight: 63 kg (139 lb)

Cycling career
- Sport: Cycling
- Current team: Feira dos Sofás–Boavista
- Discipline: Road
- Role: Rider

Amateur teams
- 2011: Bicicó
- 2012: OFM/Valongo

Professional teams
- 2013–2015: OFM–Quinta da Lixa
- 2016–2017: Sporting / Tavira
- 2018–2019: Aviludo–Louletano
- 2020–: Rádio Popular–Boavista

Luís Filipe Silva Fernandes (born 2 December 1987) is a Portuguese cyclist, who currently rides for UCI Continental team Feira dos Sofás–Boavista.

== Major results ==
2013
3rd Subida à Glória
2015
1st Circuit de Malveira
2018
1st Circuit de Póvoa da Galega
2020
5th Overall Troféu Joaquim Agostinho
2021
1st Mountains classification, Volta ao Algarve
