= Thibault Guernalec =

French cyclist

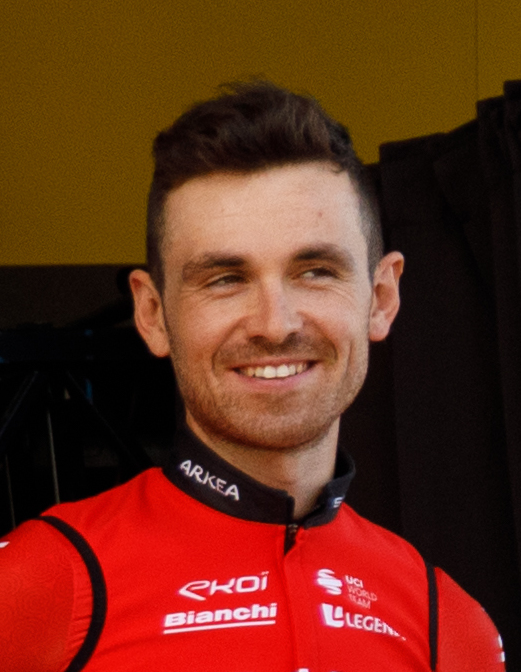
- Guernalec in 2023

Personal information
- Full name: Thibault Guernalec
- Born: 31 July 1997 (age 29) Châteaulin, France
- Height: 1.85 m (6 ft 1 in)
- Weight: 71 kg (157 lb)

Cycling career
- Sport: Cycling
- Current team: Team TotalEnergies
- Discipline: Road
- Role: Rider

Amateur teams
- 2005–2015: VC Châteaulin
- 2016–2018: Pays de Dinan

Professional teams
- 2017: Fortuneo–Oscaro (stagiaire)
- 2018–2025: Fortuneo–Samsic
- 2026–: Team TotalEnergies
Medal record
Men's road bicycle racing
Representing France
European Championships
Gold medal – first place	2025 Guilherand-Granges	Mixed team relay

Thibault Guernalec (born 31 July 1997) is a French cyclist, who currently rides for UCI ProTeam Team TotalEnergies. He is the brother of fellow cyclist Victor Guernalec.

== Major results ==
2015
1st Stage 2 Ronde des Vallées
6th Chrono des Nations Juniors
2016
3rd Time trial, National Under-23 Road Championships
2017
2nd Time trial, National Under-23 Road Championships
5th Chrono des Nations U23
2018
3rd Time trial, National Under-23 Road Championships
2019
1st Time trial, National Under-23 Road Championships
8th Chrono des Nations U23
10th Overall Tour Poitou-Charentes en Nouvelle-Aquitaine
2020
4th Overall Tour Poitou-Charentes en Nouvelle-Aquitaine

1st Young rider classification

4th Overall Vuelta a Murcia
5th Time trial, National Road Championships
2021
6th Overall Volta ao Algarve
2022
5th Time trial, National Road Championships
8th Overall Volta ao Algarve
8th Overall Étoile de Bessèges
9th Overall Circuit de la Sarthe
2023
4th Overall Tour Poitou-Charentes en Nouvelle-Aquitaine
6th Overall Tour de Wallonie
7th Grand Prix La Marseillaise
9th Chrono des Nations
2024
3rd Time trial, National Road Championships
2025
5th Overall Étoile de Bessèges
6th Overall Tour Poitou-Charentes en Nouvelle-Aquitaine
10th Chrono des Nations

=== Grand Tour general classification results timeline ===
Grand Tour	2022	2023
Giro d'Italia	—	90
Tour de France	—	—
Vuelta a España	DNF	—

Legend
—	Did not compete
DNF	Did not finish
