= Victor Guernalec =

French road cyclist

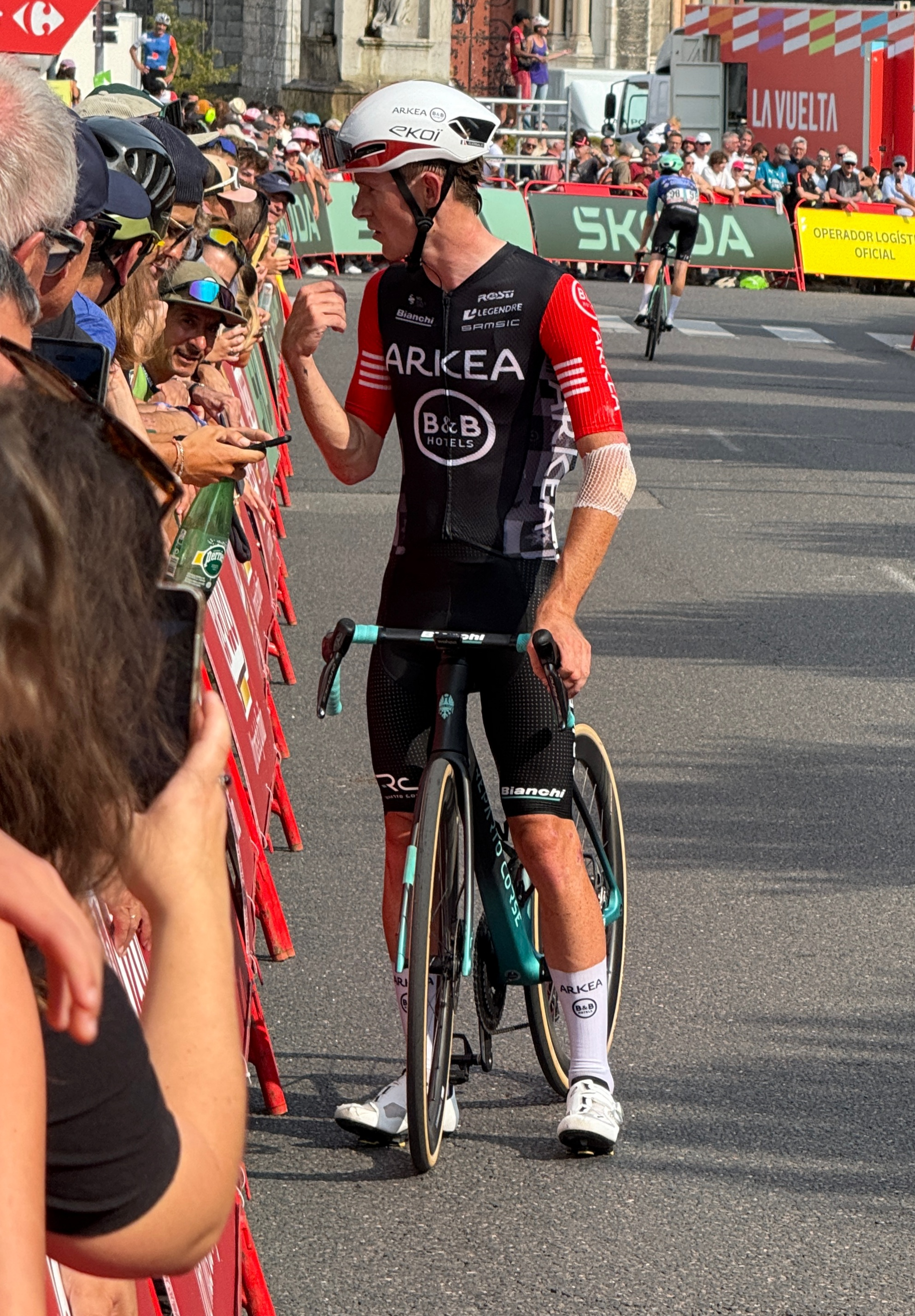

Personal information
- Born: 16 March 2000 (age 26) Châteaulin, France

Cycling career
- Sport: Cycling
- Current team: Arkéa–B&B Hotels
- Discipline: Road
- Role: Rider

Amateur teams
- 2018: VC Châteaulinois
- 2020–2021: Côtes Armor cyclisme
- 2022–2024: Bourg-en-Bresse Ain Cyclisme

Professional team
- 2025–: Arkéa–B&B Hotels

Victor Guernalec (born 16 March 2000) is a French road cyclist, who currently rides for UCI WorldTeam Arkéa–B&B Hotels.

== Career ==
Guernalec won his first professional race in April 2025 at the Région Pays de la Loire Tour, having attacked the peloton 13 kilometres away from the finish. He was joined at the front of the race by Sakarias Koller Løland and Sam Maisonobe, however outsprinted them to take the win. Later in the year he took part in the 2025 Vuelta a España. On the final stage, during a roadblock on the race, he was pushed by protestors when attempting to pass through.

== Personal life ==
Guernalec is the brother of fellow cyclist Thibault Guernalec.

== Major results ==
2017
6th Chrono des Nations Junior
2018
2nd Overall Ronde des Vallées
7th Overall Trophée Centre Morbihan
7th Chrono des Nations Junior
2023
7th Overall Tour de la Mirabelle
2024
3rd Overall Kreiz Breizh Elites
2025 (1 pro win)
1st Stage 2 Région Pays de la Loire Tour

=== Grand Tour general classification results timeline ===
Grand Tour	2025
Giro d'Italia	—
Tour de France	—
Vuelta a España	121

Legend
—	Did not compete
DNF	Did not finish
