= Élie Gesbert =

French cyclist (born 1995)

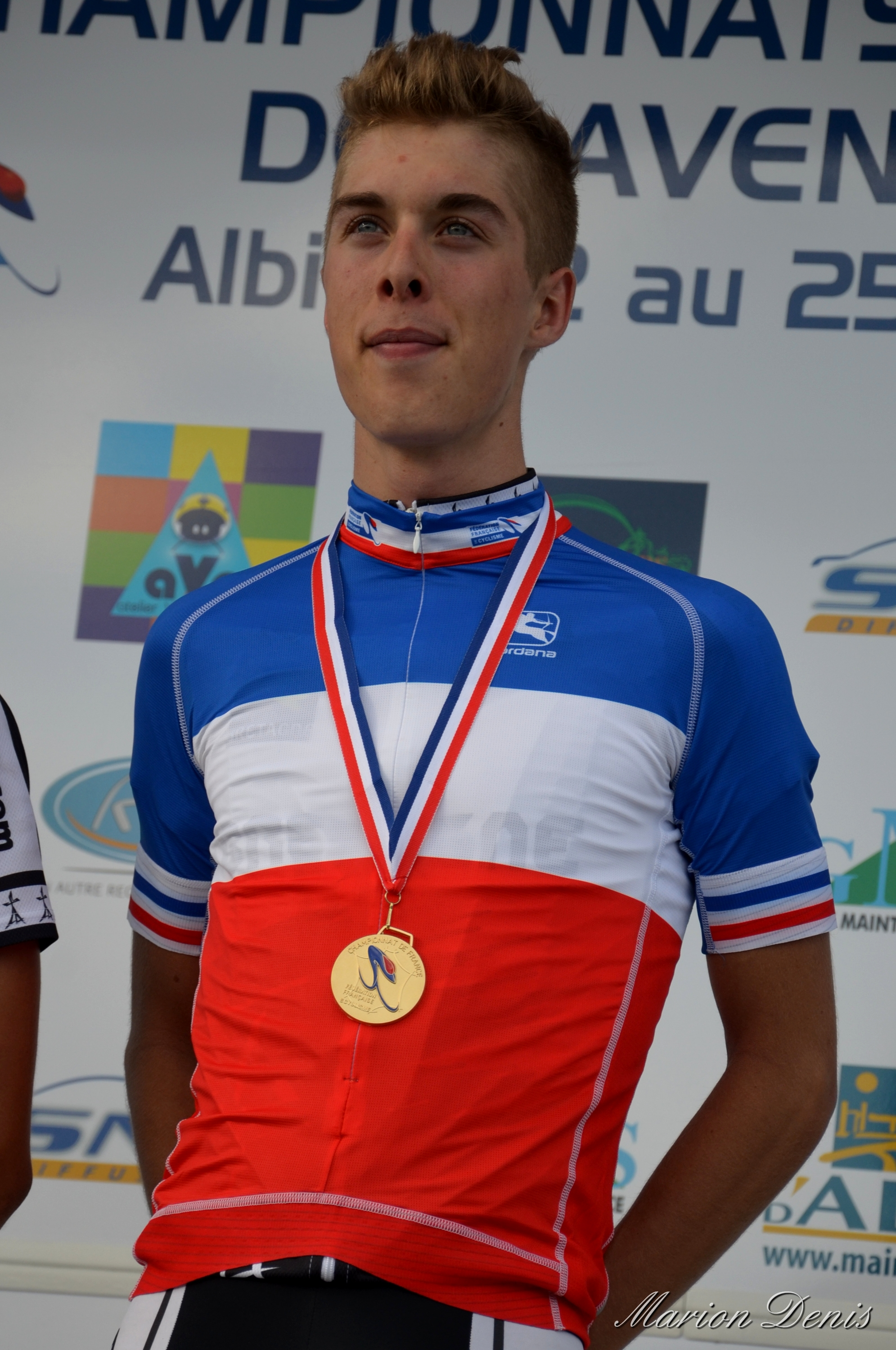

Personal information
- Born: 1 July 1995 (age 31) Saint-Brieuc, France
- Height: 1.81 m (5 ft 11 1/2 in)
- Weight: 63 kg (139 lb; 9 st 13 lb)

Cycling career
- Sport: Cycling
- Current team: Arkéa–B&B Hotels
- Discipline: Road
- Role: Rider

Amateur teams
- 2014–2015: Pays de Dinan
- 2016: Vélo Club de Loudéac

Professional teams
- 2015: FDJ (stagiaire)
- 2016–: Fortuneo–Vital Concept

Élie Gesbert (born 1 July 1995) is a French racing cyclist, who currently rides for UCI WorldTeam Arkéa–B&B Hotels. Gesbert competed in the Tour de France in 2017, 2018, 2019 and 2021.

== Career ==
=== Fortuneo–Vital Concept (2016–present) ===
Born in Saint-Brieuc, Gesbert rode the Tour de France for the first time in 2017, and started as the first rider in the opening stage individual time trial. He took his first professional win at the Tour du Limousin, as he won stage 1, where he also finished 2nd overall.

Gesbert rode his first Monument classic in 2018, at Liège–Bastogne–Liège, and finished 91st. He also participated in the Tour de France during which he was the victim of a punch from fellow competitor Gianni Moscon, which Moscon was later disqualified from the race for.

== Major results ==
2013
1st Road race, National Junior Road Championships
4th Overall Trophée Centre Morbihan
2015
1st Stage 6 Tour de l'Avenir
2nd Kreiz Breizh Elites
2016
1st Stage 3 Ronde de l'Isard
2017
2nd Overall Tour du Limousin

1st Young rider classification
1st Stage 1

4th Overall Tour de Bretagne

1st Stage 6

6th Overall Tour du Gévaudan Languedoc-Roussillon
Combativity award Stage 10 Tour de France
2019
4th Overall Tour de l'Ain
5th Overall Tour of Oman

1st Young rider classification

5th Mont Ventoux Dénivelé Challenge
6th Tour du Doubs
9th Overall Tour du Limousin
9th Paris–Camembert
Combativity award Stage 14 Tour de France
2021
5th Overall Volta ao Algarve

1st Stage 5

5th Overall Volta a la Comunitat Valenciana
5th GP Miguel Induráin
6th Overall Route d'Occitanie
2022
4th Overall Tour of Oman
5th Classic Grand Besançon Doubs
6th Tour du Jura
7th Trofeo Pollença - Port d'Andratx
9th Prueba Villafranca de Ordizia
2023
7th Overall Tour de l'Ain
7th Overall Tour du Limousin
7th Paris–Camembert
8th GP Miguel Induráin
10th Classic Grand Besançon Doubs

=== Grand Tour general classification results timeline ===
Grand Tour	2017	2018	2019	2020	2021	2022	2023	2023
Giro d'Italia	—	—	—	—	—	—	—	—
Tour de France	85	86	78	—	61	—	—	—
Vuelta a España	—	—	—	—	—	42	72	DNF

Legend
—	Did not compete
DNF	Did not finish
