= Arkéa–B&B Hotels =

French cycling team

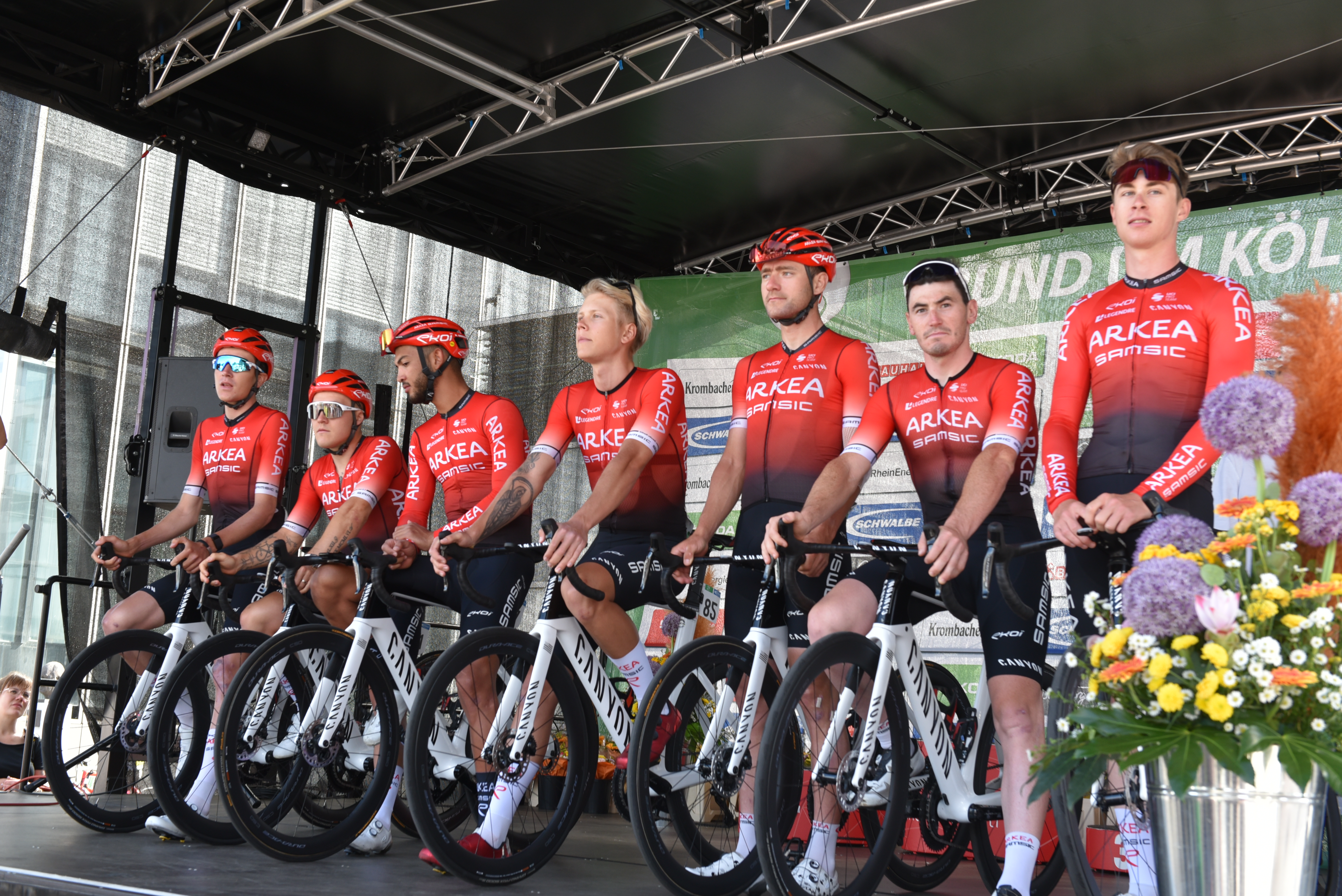

Team information
- UCI code: ARK
- Registered: France
- Founded: 2005
- Discipline: Road
- Status: UCI WorldTeam
- Bicycles: BH (2018–2019); Canyon (2020–2022); Bianchi (2023–2025)
- Website: Team home page

Key personnel
- General manager: Emmanuel Hubert
- Team managers: Sébastien Hinault; Roger Trehin

Team name history
- 2005–2006 2007–2008 2009–2012 2013–2015 2016–2017 2017 2018 2019–2023 2024–2025: Bretagne–Jean Floc'h; Bretagne–Armor Lux; Bretagne–Schuller; Bretagne–Séché Environnement; Fortuneo–Vital Concept; Fortuneo–Oscaro; Fortuneo–Samsic; Arkéa–Samsic; Arkéa–B&B Hotels

Arkéa–B&B Hotels was a UCI WorldTeam cycling team based in Rennes, France. After the team won enough points during the 2020–2022 seasons, the team was promoted from its prior status as a UCI ProTeam and now has automatic entry into all UCI World Tour races. Prior to 2023, the team participated in UCI Continental Circuits races and UCI World Tour races when receiving a wild card. The team folded in October 2025.

== History ==
The team was founded in 2005.

In 2014 they received a wildcard invitation to the 2014 Tour de France. In September 2014, the team announced they had formed a partnership with the amateur cycling team Brest Iroise Cyclisme 2000 (BIC 2000) to act as its reserve team. The team took part in the 2015 Tour de France and again in 2016, having been selected as a wildcard once again.

For 2016 and 2017 the team was named Fortuneo Vital Concept. On 1 June 2017 Vital Concept announced that it would cease sponsorship after 30 June. Oscaro stepped in as naming sponsor and the team became known as Fortuneo–Oscaro from 1 July. After six months Oscaro stepped aside, being replaced by Samsic, with both naming sponsors signing deals through to the end of the 2020 season.

For the 2018 season onwards, the team signed the WorldTour rider Warren Barguil and built the team around him. The team ran under the name of Arkéa–Samsic starting with the 2019 season. For the 2020 season, the team signed former Movistar rider Nairo Quintana.

The team launched a women's team in 2020.

The team folded in October 2025.

== Incidents ==
After the 2020 Tour de France, it was announced that an investigation into Arkéa-Samsic had been started due to suspected doping. French prosecutors said there was a "discovery of many health products including drugs ... and especially a method that could be qualified as doping."

== Team roster ==
As of 5 January 2025.

Rider	Date of birth
Jenthe Biermans (BEL)	30 October 1995 (age 30)
Amaury Capiot (BEL)	25 June 1993 (age 33)
Ewen Costiou (FRA)	10 November 2002 (age 23)
Anthony Delaplace (FRA)	11 September 1989 (age 36)
Arnaud Démare (FRA)	26 August 1991 (age 35)
Giosuè Epis (ITA)	4 March 2002 (age 24)
Raúl García Pierna (ESP)	23 February 2001 (age 25)
Élie Gesbert (FRA)	1 July 1995 (age 31)
Donavan Grondin (FRA)	26 September 2000 (age 25)
Thibault Guernalec (FRA)	31 July 1997 (age 29)
Victor Guernalec (FRA)	16 March 2000 (age 26)
Simon Guglielmi (FRA)	1 July 1997 (age 29)
Laurens Huys (BEL)	28 September 1998 (age 27)
Mathis Le Berre (FRA)	16 April 2001 (age 25)

Rider	Date of birth
Léandre Lozouet (FRA)	3 September 2004 (age 22)
Luca Mozzato (ITA)	15 February 1998 (age 28)
Michel Ries (LUX)	11 March 1998 (age 28)
Cristián Rodríguez (ESP)	3 March 1995 (age 31)
Louis Rouland (FRA)	21 October 2002 (age 23)
Miles Scotson (AUS)	18 January 1994 (age 32)
Florian Sénéchal (FRA)	10 July 1993 (age 33)
Embret Svestad-Bårdseng (NOR)	1 September 2002 (age 24)
Pierre Thierry (FRA)	31 May 2003 (age 23)
Martin Tjøtta (NOR)	27 January 2001 (age 25)
Kévin Vauquelin (FRA)	26 April 2001 (age 25)
Clément Venturini (FRA)	16 October 1993 (age 32)
Alessandro Verre (ITA)	17 November 2001 (age 24)

== Major wins ==
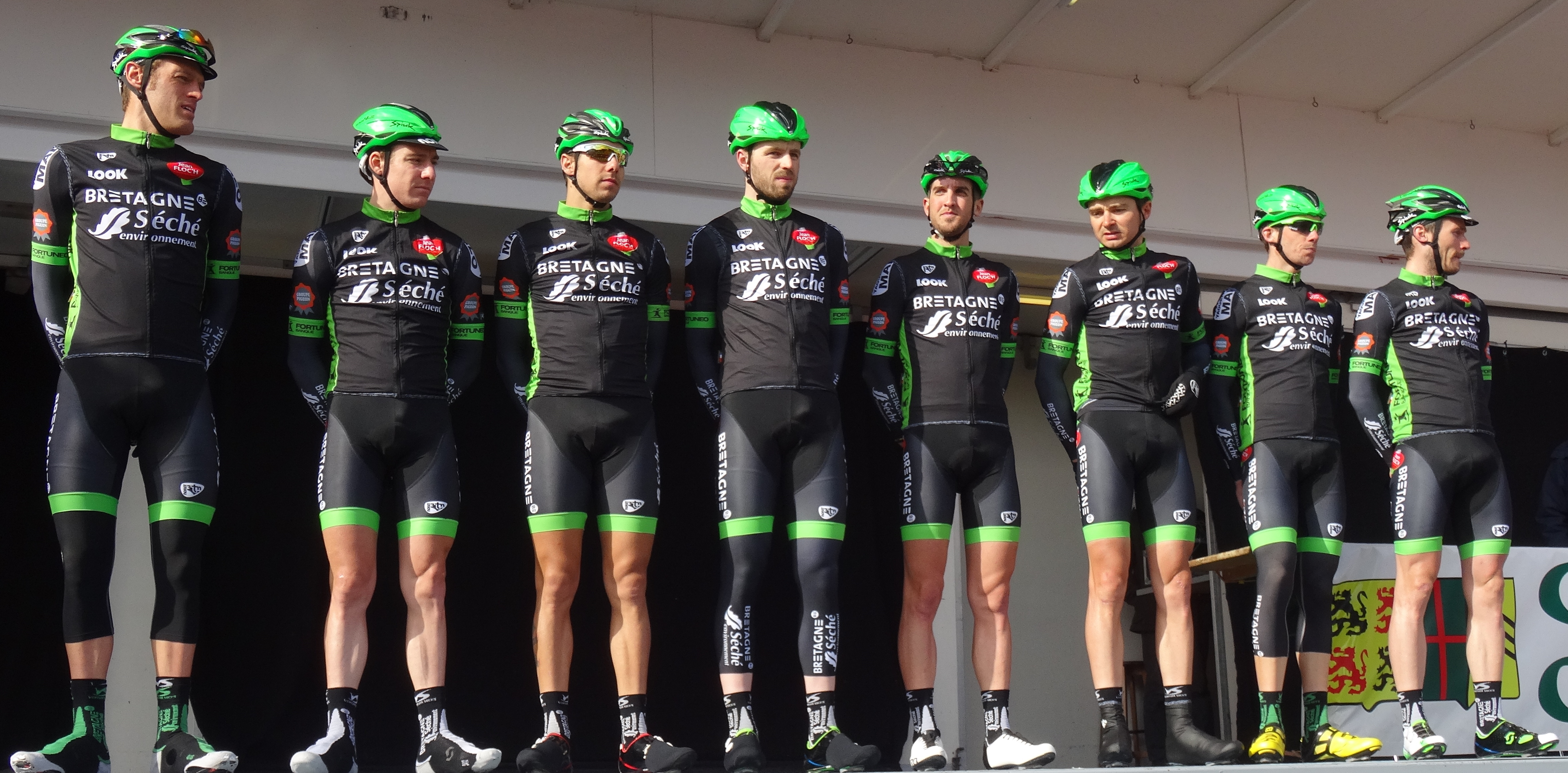
The team in 2015

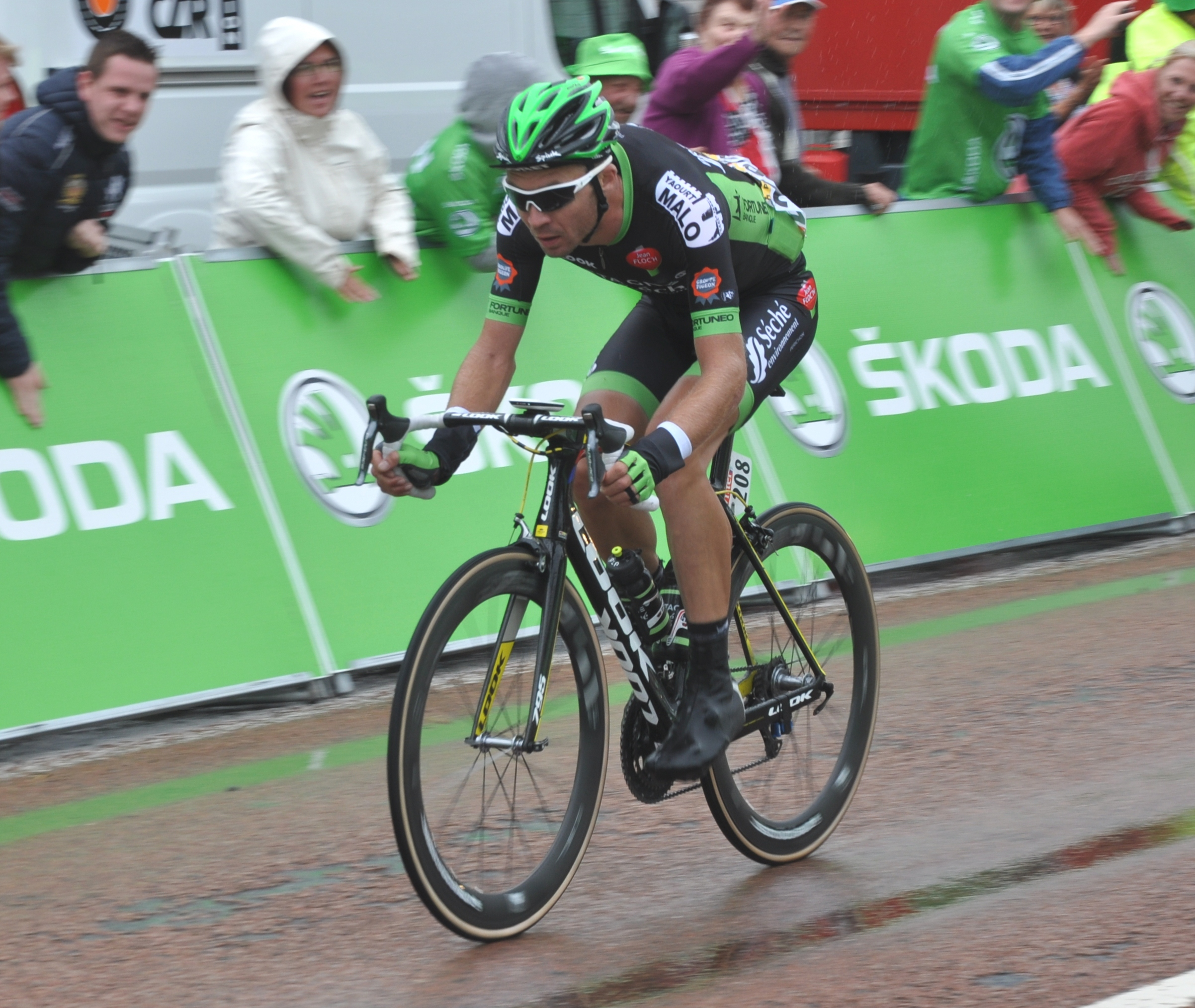
Pierre-Luc Périchon in Tour de France 2015.

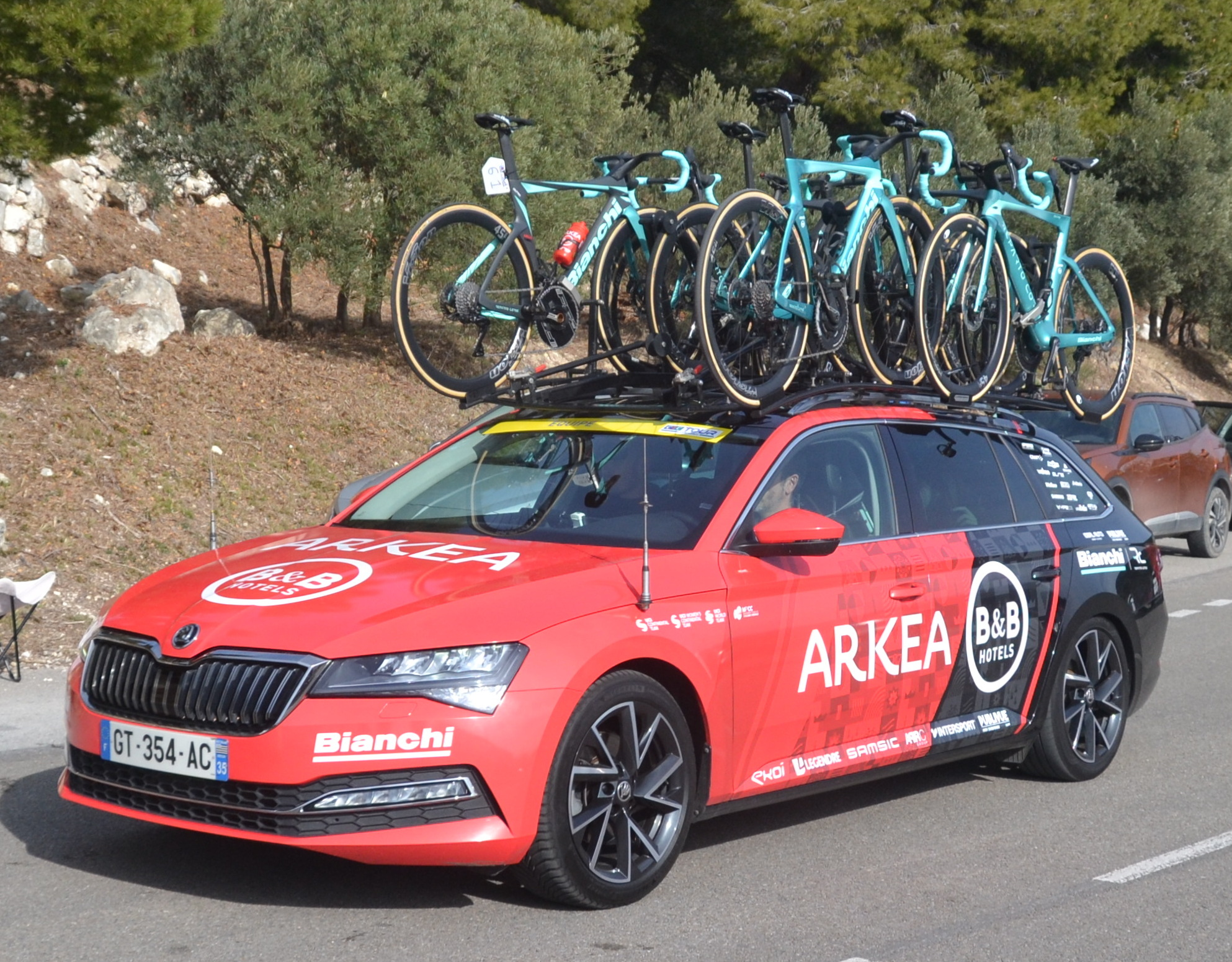
The team car

== National champions ==
2009
France Road Race Championship, Dimitri Champion
2019
France Road Race Championship, Warren Barguil
