= 2019 Tour de France, Stage 1 to Stage 11 =

Stages of cycle race

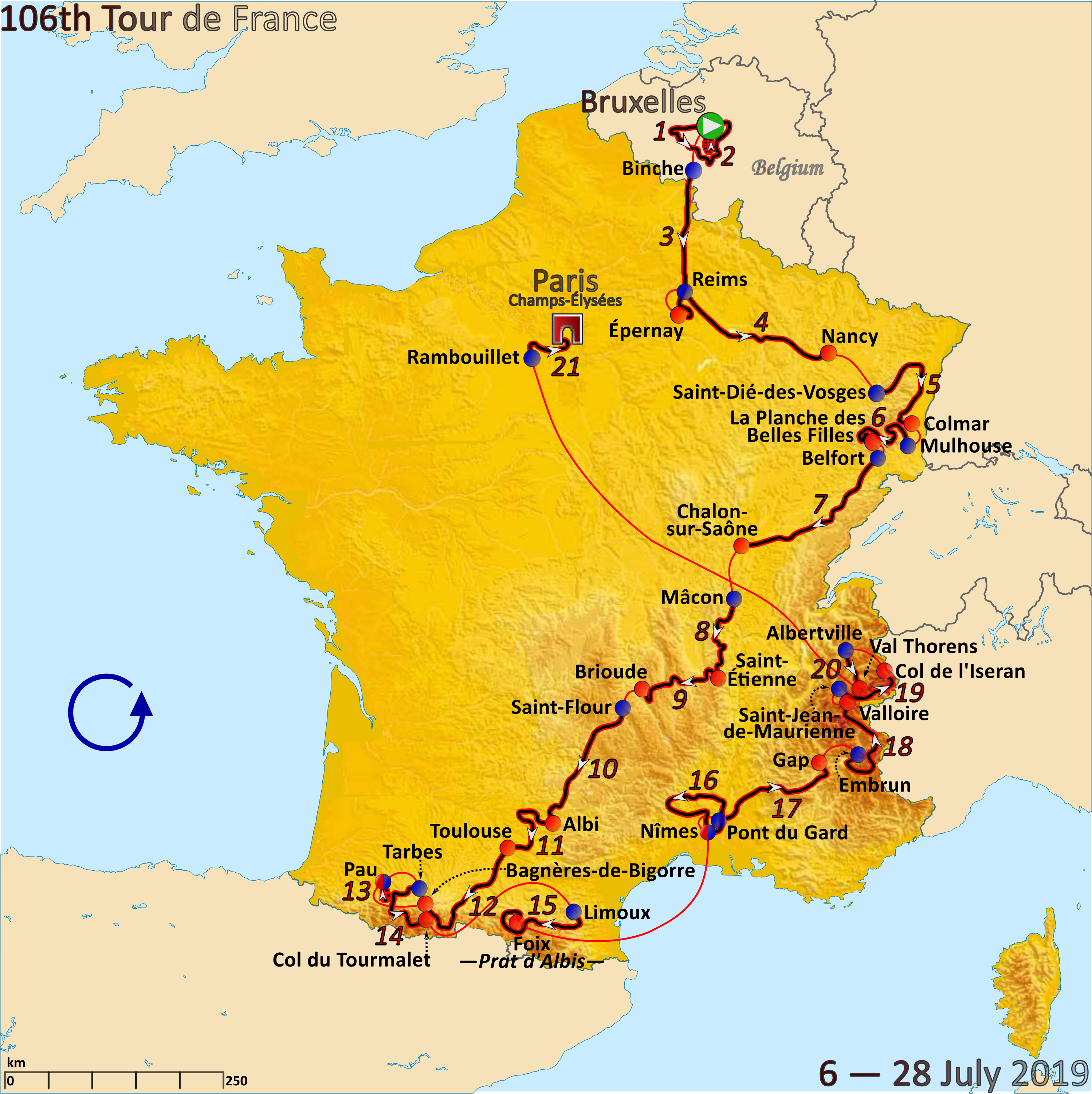
Route of the 2019 Tour de France

The 2019 Tour de France was the 106th edition of Tour de France, one of cycling's Grand Tours. The Tour began in Brussels, Belgium, with a flat stage on 6 July, and Stage 11 occurred on 17 July with a flat stage to Toulouse. The race finished on the Champs-Élysées in Paris on 28 July.

== Classification standings ==
Legend
A yellow jersey.	Denotes the leader of the general classification	A white jersey with red polka dots.	Denotes the leader of the mountains classification
A green jersey.	Denotes the leader of the points classification	A white jersey.	Denotes the leader of the young rider classification
A white jersey with a yellow number bib.	Denotes the leader of the team classification	A white jersey with a red number bib.	Denotes the winner of the combativity award

== Stage 1 ==
6 July 2019 - Brussels to Brussels via Charleroi, 194.5 km (120.9 mi)

Greg Van Avermaet went forward of the peloton from the start of the stage, with a group of three other riders. Van Avermaet proceeded to collect the early mountains points on the Muur van Geraardsbergen before returning to the peloton. The breakaway group had all returned to the peloton, before the sprint, with 70 km (43 mi) remaining. The sprint was won by Mike Teunissen. Jakob Fuglsang suffered a crash with 18 km (11 mi) remaining, and continued but required medical attention. Dylan Groenewegen and Geraint Thomas were involved in a crash in the final 2 km (1.2 mi) of the stage, with both able to continue the race.

Stage 1 result
Rank	Rider	Team	Time
1	Mike Teunissen (NED)	Team Jumbo–Visma	4h 22' 47"
2	Peter Sagan (SVK)	Bora–Hansgrohe	+ 0"
3	Caleb Ewan (AUS)	Lotto–Soudal	+ 0"
4	Giacomo Nizzolo (ITA)	Team Dimension Data	+ 0"
5	Sonny Colbrelli (ITA)	Bahrain–Merida	+ 0"
6	Michael Matthews (AUS)	Team Sunweb	+ 0"
7	Matteo Trentin (ITA)	Mitchelton–Scott	+ 0"
8	Oliver Naesen (BEL)	AG2R La Mondiale	+ 0"
9	Elia Viviani (ITA)	Deceuninck–Quick-Step	+ 0"
10	Jasper Stuyven (BEL)	Trek–Segafredo	+ 0"

General classification after Stage 1 (Note: The time difference, between the stage result and the general classification, is explained by time bonuses given at the stage finish.)
Rank	Rider	Team	Time
1	Mike Teunissen (NED)	Team Jumbo–Visma	4h 22' 37"
2	Peter Sagan (SVK)	Bora–Hansgrohe	+ 4"
3	Caleb Ewan (AUS)	Lotto–Soudal	+ 6"
4	Giacomo Nizzolo (ITA)	Team Dimension Data	+ 10"
5	Sonny Colbrelli (ITA)	Bahrain–Merida	+ 10"
6	Michael Matthews (AUS)	Team Sunweb	+ 10"
7	Matteo Trentin (ITA)	Mitchelton–Scott	+ 10"
8	Oliver Naesen (BEL)	AG2R La Mondiale	+ 10"
9	Elia Viviani (ITA)	Deceuninck–Quick-Step	+ 10"
10	Jasper Stuyven (BEL)	Trek–Segafredo	+ 10"

== Stage 2 ==
7 July 2019 - Brussels-Royal Palace to Brussels-Atomium, 27.6 km (17.1 mi) (TTT)

The twenty-two teams departed at five-minute intervals between 2:30pm and 4:15pm CET.

The finishing time of Team Ineos, the first team to depart, remained the best time until the final team, Team Jumbo–Visma, completed the course. Team Jumbo–Visma averaged 57 km/h (35 mph) along the route. Groupama–FDJ's David Gaudu suffered a crash on the final corner of the course, sustaining a superficial injury.

Stage 2 result
Rank	Team	Time
1	Team Jumbo–Visma	28' 57"
2	Team Ineos	+ 20"
3	Deceuninck–Quick-Step	+ 21"
4	Team Katusha–Alpecin	+ 26"
5	Team Sunweb	+ 26"
6	EF Education First	+ 28"
7	CCC Team	+ 31"
8	Groupama–FDJ	+ 32"
9	Bahrain–Merida	+ 36"
10	Astana	+ 41"

General classification after stage 2
Rank	Rider	Team	Time
1	Mike Teunissen (NED)	Team Jumbo–Visma	4h 51' 34"
2	Wout van Aert (BEL)	Team Jumbo–Visma	+ 10"
3	Steven Kruijswijk (NED)	Team Jumbo–Visma	+ 10"
4	Tony Martin (GER)	Team Jumbo–Visma	+ 10"
5	George Bennett (NZL)	Team Jumbo–Visma	+ 10"
6	Gianni Moscon (ITA)	Team Ineos	+ 30"
7	Egan Bernal (COL)	Team Ineos	+ 30"
8	Geraint Thomas (GBR)	Team Ineos	+ 30"
9	Dylan van Baarle (NED)	Team Ineos	+ 30"
10	Elia Viviani (ITA)	Deceuninck–Quick-Step	+ 31"

== Stage 3 ==
8 July 2019 - Binche to Épernay, 215 km (134 mi)

A breakaway group of five riders, including Tim Wellens, went in front of the peloton from early in the stage. Wellens attacked the lead group at 48.5 km (30.1 mi) from the finish, on the approach to the Côte de Nanteuil-la-Fôret. The remainder of the breakaway were caught with 30 km (19 mi) remaining, while Wellens had an advantage of over a minute and a half to the peloton. Julian Alaphilippe attacked on the final climb of the day, the Côte de Mutigny, reaching Wellens at the top of the climb. Alaphilippe then continued forward, alone, for the final 15 km (9.3 mi).

Stage 3 result
Rank	Rider	Team	Time
1	Julian Alaphilippe (FRA)	Deceuninck–Quick-Step	4h 40' 29"
2	Michael Matthews (AUS)	Team Sunweb	+ 26"
3	Jasper Stuyven (BEL)	Trek–Segafredo	+ 26"
4	Greg Van Avermaet (BEL)	CCC Team	+ 26"
5	Peter Sagan (SVK)	Bora–Hansgrohe	+ 26"
6	Matteo Trentin (ITA)	Mitchelton–Scott	+ 26"
7	Sonny Colbrelli (ITA)	Bahrain–Merida	+ 26"
8	Xandro Meurisse (BEL)	Wanty–Gobert	+ 26"
9	Wout van Aert (BEL)	Team Jumbo–Visma	+ 26"
10	Thibaut Pinot (FRA)	Groupama–FDJ	+ 26"

General classification after stage 3
Rank	Rider	Team	Time
1	Julian Alaphilippe (FRA)	Deceuninck–Quick-Step	9h 32' 19"
2	Wout van Aert (BEL)	Team Jumbo–Visma	+ 20"
3	Steven Kruijswijk (NED)	Team Jumbo–Visma	+ 25"
4	George Bennett (NZL)	Team Jumbo–Visma	+ 25"
5	Michael Matthews (AUS)	Team Sunweb	+ 40"
6	Egan Bernal (COL)	Team Ineos	+ 40"
7	Geraint Thomas (GBR)	Team Ineos	+ 45"
8	Enric Mas (ESP)	Deceuninck–Quick-Step	+ 46"
9	Greg Van Avermaet (BEL)	CCC Team	+ 51"
10	Wilco Kelderman (NED)	Team Sunweb	+ 51"

== Stage 4 ==
9 July 2019 - Reims to Nancy, 213.5 km (132.7 mi)

A group of three riders went ahead of the peloton from early in the stage, having an advantage of around three and a half minutes with 92 km (57 mi) remaining. The peloton caught the breakaway group at 16 km (9.9 mi) from the finish. Lilian Calmejane attacked with around 10 km (6.2 mi) remaining, but was caught with 6 km (3.7 mi) to go. The race then finished with a bunch sprint.

Stage 4 result
Rank	Rider	Team	Time
1	Elia Viviani (ITA)	Deceuninck–Quick-Step	5h 09' 20"
2	Alexander Kristoff (NOR)	UAE Team Emirates	+ 0"
3	Caleb Ewan (AUS)	Lotto–Soudal	+ 0"
4	Peter Sagan (SVK)	Bora–Hansgrohe	+ 0"
5	Dylan Groenewegen (NED)	Team Jumbo–Visma	+ 0"
6	Mike Teunissen (NED)	Team Jumbo–Visma	+ 0"
7	Giacomo Nizzolo (ITA)	Team Dimension Data	+ 0"
8	Jasper Stuyven (BEL)	Trek–Segafredo	+ 0"
9	Michael Matthews (AUS)	Team Sunweb	+ 0"
10	Christophe Laporte (FRA)	Cofidis	+ 0"

General classification after stage 4
Rank	Rider	Team	Time
1	Julian Alaphilippe (FRA)	Deceuninck–Quick-Step	14h 41' 39"
2	Wout van Aert (BEL)	Team Jumbo–Visma	+ 20"
3	Steven Kruijswijk (NED)	Team Jumbo–Visma	+ 25"
4	George Bennett (NZL)	Team Jumbo–Visma	+ 25"
5	Michael Matthews (AUS)	Team Sunweb	+ 40"
6	Egan Bernal (COL)	Team Ineos	+ 40"
7	Geraint Thomas (GBR)	Team Ineos	+ 45"
8	Enric Mas (ESP)	Deceuninck–Quick-Step	+ 46"
9	Greg Van Avermaet (BEL)	CCC Team	+ 51"
10	Michael Woods (CAN)	EF Education First	+ 51"

== Stage 5 ==
10 July 2019 - Saint-Dié-des-Vosges to Colmar, 175.5 km (109.1 mi)

A four-man breakaway group established itself over 20 km (12 mi) into the stage, with Tim Wellens leading the race over the first two climbs. Toms Skujiņš attacked from the lead group with 37 km (23 mi) remaining, leading the race over the Côte des Trois-Epis. The remainder of the peloton neutralised the breakaway group participants before the top of the Côte des Cinq Chateaux. Rui Costa established a short lead in the final few kilometres, being caught with 2 km (1.2 mi) to go. The stage then concluded with a bunch sprint.

Stage 5 result
Rank	Rider	Team	Time
1	Peter Sagan (SVK)	Bora–Hansgrohe	4h 02' 33"
2	Wout van Aert (BEL)	Team Jumbo–Visma	+ 0"
3	Matteo Trentin (ITA)	Mitchelton–Scott	+ 0"
4	Sonny Colbrelli (ITA)	Bahrain–Merida	+ 0"
5	Greg Van Avermaet (BEL)	CCC Team	+ 0"
6	Julien Simon (FRA)	Cofidis	+ 0"
7	Michael Matthews (AUS)	Team Sunweb	+ 0"
8	Nils Politt (GER)	Team Katusha–Alpecin	+ 0"
9	Jasper Stuyven (BEL)	Trek–Segafredo	+ 0"
10	Julian Alaphilippe (FRA)	Deceuninck–Quick-Step	+ 0"

General classification after stage 5
Rank	Rider	Team	Time
1	Julian Alaphilippe (FRA)	Deceuninck–Quick-Step	18h 44' 12"
2	Wout van Aert (BEL)	Team Jumbo–Visma	+ 14"
3	Steven Kruijswijk (NED)	Team Jumbo–Visma	+ 25"
4	George Bennett (NZL)	Team Jumbo–Visma	+ 25"
5	Michael Matthews (AUS)	Team Sunweb	+ 40"
6	Egan Bernal (COL)	Team Ineos	+ 40"
7	Geraint Thomas (GBR)	Team Ineos	+ 45"
8	Enric Mas (ESP)	Deceuninck–Quick-Step	+ 46"
9	Peter Sagan (SVK)	Bora–Hansgrohe	+ 50"
10	Greg Van Avermaet (BEL)	CCC Team	+ 51"

== Stage 6 ==
11 July 2019 - Mulhouse to La Planche des Belles Filles, 160.5 km (99.7 mi)

The sixth stage featured the first real climbs of the Tour, entering the Vosges mountain range. The riders departed from Mulhouse heading north through Wittelsheim and Guebwiller to a sprint at Linthal. The route then headed west to the category 1 climb of Le Markstein at 1,183 m (3,881 ft) and turned east, continuing the climb into the category 3 Grand Ballon. Heading south, the riders climbed the category 2 Col du Hundstruck. The race then continued east to the category 1 Ballon d'Alsace at 1,178 m (3,865 ft), and then the category 3 Col des Croix. Continuing south, the riders climbed the category 2 Col des Chevrères, before winding south and then east, to the finish line at the category 1 climb to La Planche des Belles Filles, at 1,140 m (3,740 ft). This was the fourth ever finish at La Planche des Belles Filles, with the three previous times always resulting in the eventual overall Tour winner ending this stage in the yellow jersey.

New Zealand's Patrick Bevin did not start the stage, becoming the first rider to withdraw from the tour after X-rays revealed fractured ribs as a result of crash two days before. Later during the stage Nicolas Edet would abandon as well, due to illness.

At the start of the stage, fourteen riders quickly formed the breakaway group, including amongst others the leader of the mountains classification Tim Wellens; former stage winners Thomas De Gendt and André Greipel; and the 2019 Giro d'Italia mountains classification winner Giulio Ciccone who was also the best placed in the general classification at 1' 43" behind Julian Alaphilippe. The advantage over the peloton quickly rose to five minutes, growing to eight minutes at the foot of the Ballon d'Alsace, with Deceuninck–Quick-Step struggling to bring the peloton closer and stopping the chase altogether. Meanwhile at the front, Wellens was gathering most points for the mountains classification, occasionally helped by his teammate De Gendt. De Gendt sprinted away to take the points on the Col des Croix and took a lead of 30 seconds in the descent, but was overtaken on the next climb when the breakaway group got split up completely. Four riders remained in the lead and started the ascent of the final climb with still four minutes of advantage over the peloton: Giulio Ciccone and three Flemish riders: Wellens, Xandro Meurisse and Dylan Teuns. Ciccone and Teuns still had two minutes of advantage over the peloton with one kilometre to go, in spite of attacks from Warren Barguil and Mikel Landa in front of a chasing peloton. Teuns drove the full last km just in front of Ciccone, dropping him only in the last 100 metres to take his first Grand Tour stage win, while Meurisse managed to take third place over a minute behind. Geraint Thomas was fastest of the favorites, gaining some seconds over most other favorites and Alaphilippe. Bigger time losses were noted for Steven Kruijswijk and Enric Mas who lost over half a minute, while Vincenzo Nibali and Romain Bardet lost almost a full minute. Despite finishing second, Ciccone did manage to take over the yellow jersey from Alaphilippe by a narrow margin of only six seconds.

Stage 6 result
Rank	Rider	Team	Time
1	Dylan Teuns (BEL)	Bahrain–Merida	4h 29' 03"
2	Giulio Ciccone (ITA)	Trek–Segafredo	+ 11"
3	Xandro Meurisse (BEL)	Wanty–Gobert	+ 1' 05"
4	Geraint Thomas (GBR)	Team Ineos	+ 1' 44"
5	Thibaut Pinot (FRA)	Groupama–FDJ	+ 1' 46"
6	Julian Alaphilippe (FRA)	Deceuninck–Quick-Step	+ 1' 46"
7	Nairo Quintana (COL)	Movistar Team	+ 1' 51"
8	Emanuel Buchmann (GER)	Bora–Hansgrohe	+ 1' 51"
9	Jakob Fuglsang (DEN)	Astana	+ 1' 53"
10	Mikel Landa (ESP)	Movistar Team	+ 1' 53"

General classification after stage 6
Rank	Rider	Team	Time
1	Giulio Ciccone (ITA)	Trek–Segafredo	23h 14' 55"
2	Julian Alaphilippe (FRA)	Deceuninck–Quick-Step	+ 6"
3	Dylan Teuns (BEL)	Bahrain–Merida	+ 32"
4	George Bennett (NZL)	Team Jumbo–Visma	+ 47"
5	Geraint Thomas (GBR)	Team Ineos	+ 49"
6	Egan Bernal (COL)	Team Ineos	+ 53"
7	Thibaut Pinot (FRA)	Groupama–FDJ	+ 58"
8	Steven Kruijswijk (NED)	Team Jumbo–Visma	+ 1' 04"
9	Michael Woods (CAN)	EF Education First	+ 1' 13"
10	Rigoberto Urán (COL)	EF Education First	+ 1' 15"

== Stage 7 ==
12 July 2019 - Belfort to Chalon-sur-Saône, 230 km (140 mi)

Stage seven was the longest stage of the tour. A two-man breakaway, comprising Stéphane Rossetto and Yoann Offredo, led from early in the stage. Tejay van Garderen and Mike Teunissen crashed after 7 km (4.3 mi) of racing, but both managed to continue. The two man-breakaway extended their lead to over four minutes, but returned to the peloton with 12 km (7.5 mi) remaining. The stage then concluded with a bunch sprint.

Stage 7 result
Rank	Rider	Team	Time
1	Dylan Groenewegen (NED)	Team Jumbo–Visma	6h 02' 44"
2	Caleb Ewan (AUS)	Lotto–Soudal	+ 0"
3	Peter Sagan (SVK)	Bora–Hansgrohe	+ 0"
4	Sonny Colbrelli (ITA)	Bahrain–Merida	+ 0"
5	Jasper Philipsen (BEL)	UAE Team Emirates	+ 0"
6	Elia Viviani (ITA)	Deceuninck–Quick-Step	+ 0"
7	Giacomo Nizzolo (ITA)	Team Dimension Data	+ 0"
8	Jasper Stuyven (BEL)	Trek–Segafredo	+ 0"
9	Michael Matthews (AUS)	Team Sunweb	+ 0"
10	Alexander Kristoff (NOR)	UAE Team Emirates	+ 0"

General classification after stage 7
Rank	Rider	Team	Time
1	Giulio Ciccone (ITA)	Trek–Segafredo	29h 17' 39"
2	Julian Alaphilippe (FRA)	Deceuninck–Quick-Step	+ 6"
3	Dylan Teuns (BEL)	Bahrain–Merida	+ 32"
4	George Bennett (NZL)	Team Jumbo–Visma	+ 47"
5	Geraint Thomas (GBR)	Team Ineos	+ 49"
6	Egan Bernal (COL)	Team Ineos	+ 53"
7	Thibaut Pinot (FRA)	Groupama–FDJ	+ 58"
8	Steven Kruijswijk (NED)	Team Jumbo–Visma	+ 1' 04"
9	Michael Woods (CAN)	EF Education First	+ 1' 13"
10	Rigoberto Urán (COL)	EF Education First	+ 1' 15"

== Stage 8 ==
13 July 2019 - Mâcon to Saint-Étienne, 200 km (120 mi)

A quartet of riders established a five minute lead, by the intermediate sprint, at 43.5 km (27 mi) into the stage. The group contained Thomas De Gendt, Niki Terpstra, Ben King and Alessandro De Marchi. Terpstra won the intermediate sprint, and De Gendt then led the race over the first three climbs. De Gendt and De Marchi dropped the other two riders on the Côte de la Croix de Part, with 60 km (37 mi) still to race. Michael Woods, Geraint Thomas and Gianni Moscon were involved in a crash with 15 km (9.3 mi) remaining, which destroyed Moscon's bike frame, though all riders were able to continue. De Gendt attacked De Marchi with 13 km (8.1 mi) to race, having around a minute's advantage over the main group of riders. As De Marchi was caught by the main group, Julian Alaphilippe attacked and Thibaut Pinot quickly followed. The pair kept their gap over the peloton, to the finish, but failed to catch stage winner De Gendt.

Stage 8 result
Rank	Rider	Team	Time
1	Thomas De Gendt (BEL)	Lotto–Soudal	5h 00' 17"
2	Thibaut Pinot (FRA)	Groupama–FDJ	+ 6"
3	Julian Alaphilippe (FRA)	Deceuninck–Quick-Step	+ 6"
4	Michael Matthews (AUS)	Team Sunweb	+ 26"
5	Peter Sagan (SVK)	Bora–Hansgrohe	+ 26"
6	Matteo Trentin (ITA)	Mitchelton–Scott	+ 26"
7	Xandro Meurisse (BEL)	Wanty–Gobert	+ 26"
8	Greg Van Avermaet (BEL)	CCC Team	+ 26"
9	Egan Bernal (COL)	Team Ineos	+ 26"
10	Geraint Thomas (GBR)	Team Ineos	+ 26"

General classification after stage 8
Rank	Rider	Team	Time
1	Julian Alaphilippe (FRA)	Deceuninck–Quick-Step	34h 17' 59"
2	Giulio Ciccone (ITA)	Trek–Segafredo	+ 23"
3	Thibaut Pinot (FRA)	Groupama–FDJ	+ 53"
4	George Bennett (NZL)	Team Jumbo–Visma	+ 1' 10"
5	Geraint Thomas (GBR)	Team Ineos	+ 1' 12"
6	Egan Bernal (COL)	Team Ineos	+ 1' 16"
7	Steven Kruijswijk (NED)	Team Jumbo–Visma	+ 1' 27"
8	Rigoberto Urán (COL)	EF Education First	+ 1' 38"
9	Jakob Fuglsang (DEN)	Astana	+ 1' 42"
10	Emanuel Buchmann (GER)	Bora–Hansgrohe	+ 1' 45"

== Stage 9 ==
14 July 2019 - Saint-Étienne to Brioude, 170.5 km (105.9 mi)

Early in the stage, Alessandro De Marchi suffered a crash which required hospitalisation. A 15-strong breakaway group went ahead of the peloton before the category 1 Mur d'Aurec-sur-Loire and gained a 10-minute advantage before the intermediate sprint, which was won by Edvald Boasson Hagen. Simon Clarke and Jan Tratnik attacked the lead group with 61 km (38 mi) remaining, with some of the group chasing them down. Lukas Pöstlberger then managed to gain just under a minute's advantage, with 25 km (16 mi) still to race, but was caught and left behind on the Cote de Saint-Just by Nicolas Roche and Tiesj Benoot, 11 km (6.8 mi) later. Daryl Impey then bridged the gap to the two lead riders. With 8 km (5 mi) to go, Benoot attacked, dropping Roche, while Impey stayed with the leader. The two attackers maintained their advantage to the finish, with the fragmented breakaway group crossing the line in the following minutes, and the peloton finishing 16 minutes later.

Stage 9 result
Rank	Rider	Team	Time
1	Daryl Impey (RSA)	Mitchelton–Scott	4h 03' 12"
2	Tiesj Benoot (BEL)	Lotto–Soudal	+ 0"
3	Jan Tratnik (SLO)	Bahrain–Merida	+ 10"
4	Oliver Naesen (BEL)	AG2R La Mondiale	+ 10"
5	Jasper Stuyven (BEL)	Trek–Segafredo	+ 10"
6	Nicolas Roche (IRL)	Team Sunweb	+ 14"
7	Marc Soler (ESP)	Movistar Team	+ 21"
8	Iván García Cortina (ESP)	Bahrain–Merida	+ 1' 50"
9	Simon Clarke (AUS)	EF Education First	+ 1' 50"
10	Anthony Delaplace (FRA)	Arkéa–Samsic	+ 2' 42"

General classification after stage 9
Rank	Rider	Team	Time
1	Julian Alaphilippe (FRA)	Deceuninck–Quick-Step	38h 37' 36"
2	Giulio Ciccone (ITA)	Trek–Segafredo	+ 23"
3	Thibaut Pinot (FRA)	Groupama–FDJ	+ 53"
4	George Bennett (NZL)	Team Jumbo–Visma	+ 1' 10"
5	Geraint Thomas (GBR)	Team Ineos	+ 1' 12"
6	Egan Bernal (COL)	Team Ineos	+ 1' 16"
7	Steven Kruijswijk (NED)	Team Jumbo–Visma	+ 1' 27"
8	Rigoberto Urán (COL)	EF Education First	+ 1' 38"
9	Jakob Fuglsang (DEN)	Astana	+ 1' 42"
10	Emanuel Buchmann (GER)	Bora–Hansgrohe	+ 1' 45"

== Stage 10 ==
15 July 2019 - Saint-Flour to Albi, 217.5 km (135.1 mi)

A five-man breakaway group went ahead from early in the stage, gaining a lead of about three and a half minutes. The intermediate sprint was won by Odd Christian Eiking from the group, with the peloton closing the lead group's advantage down to a minute and a half. With 60 km (37 mi) still to race, crosswinds began to temporarily fracture the peloton. Crosswinds happened again with 35 km (22 mi) to go, but pressure from the lead section of the broken peloton ensured that a gap was maintained. The lead section of the peloton then caught the breakaway group with 25 km (16 mi) to race, while the second and a third section were at 30 seconds and a minute's disadvantage, respectively. By the last 4 km (2.5 mi), the gaps were stretched out further. Wout van Aert then won the sprint, from the lead section of the peloton.

Stage 10 result
Rank	Rider	Team	Time
1	Wout van Aert (BEL)	Team Jumbo–Visma	4h 49' 39"
2	Elia Viviani (ITA)	Deceuninck–Quick-Step	+ 0"
3	Caleb Ewan (AUS)	Lotto–Soudal	+ 0"
4	Michael Matthews (AUS)	Team Sunweb	+ 0"
5	Peter Sagan (SVK)	Bora–Hansgrohe	+ 0"
6	Jasper Philipsen (BEL)	UAE Team Emirates	+ 0"
7	Sonny Colbrelli (ITA)	Bahrain–Merida	+ 0"
8	Matteo Trentin (ITA)	Mitchelton–Scott	+ 0"
9	Oliver Naesen (BEL)	AG2R La Mondiale	+ 0"
10	Greg Van Avermaet (BEL)	CCC Team	+ 0"

General classification after stage 10
Rank	Rider	Team	Time
1	Julian Alaphilippe (FRA)	Deceuninck–Quick-Step	43h 27' 15"
2	Geraint Thomas (GBR)	Team Ineos	+ 1' 12"
3	Egan Bernal (COL)	Team Ineos	+ 1' 16"
4	Steven Kruijswijk (NED)	Team Jumbo–Visma	+ 1' 27"
5	Emanuel Buchmann (GER)	Bora–Hansgrohe	+ 1' 45"
6	Enric Mas (ESP)	Deceuninck–Quick-Step	+ 1' 46"
7	Adam Yates (GBR)	Mitchelton–Scott	+ 1' 47"
8	Nairo Quintana (COL)	Movistar Team	+ 2' 04"
9	Dan Martin (IRL)	UAE Team Emirates	+ 2' 09"
10	Giulio Ciccone (ITA)	Trek–Segafredo	+ 2' 32"

== Rest day 1 ==
16 July 2019 - Albi

== Stage 11 ==
17 July 2019 - Albi to Toulouse, 167 km (104 mi)

A four-man breakaway established itself early in the stage, comprising Lilian Calmejane, Stéphane Rossetto, Anthony Perez and Aimé De Gendt. The group achieved an advantage of three and a half minutes by the Côte de Tonnac, 32 km (20 mi) into the stage. Perez won the intermediate sprint in Gaillac, with 80 km (50 mi) still to race. With 50 km (31 mi) to race, the breakaway group's advantage had been reduced to less than a minute. A crash in the peloton happened around 31 km (19 mi) from the finish line, forcing Niki Terpstra to abandon the Tour, and requiring Nairo Quintana and Richie Porte's teammates to help their team leaders back to the peloton. De Gendt attacked from the breakaway group with 10 km (6.2 mi) remaining, achieving a 40-second gap, but De Gendt and the rest of the lead group were caught with less than 5 km (3.1 mi) from the finish. The race then finished with a bunch sprint. During the sprint, a spectator's cell phone hit the helmet of Niccolò Bonifazio, ruining his chances at a stage victory and making the Italian sprinter visibly frustrated.

Stage 11 result
Rank	Rider	Team	Time
1	Caleb Ewan (AUS)	Lotto–Soudal	3h 51' 26"
2	Dylan Groenewegen (NED)	Team Jumbo–Visma	+ 0"
3	Elia Viviani (ITA)	Deceuninck–Quick-Step	+ 0"
4	Peter Sagan (SVK)	Bora–Hansgrohe	+ 0"
5	Jens Debusschere (BEL)	Team Katusha–Alpecin	+ 0"
6	Sonny Colbrelli (ITA)	Bahrain–Merida	+ 0"
7	Jasper Philipsen (BEL)	UAE Team Emirates	+ 0"
8	Cees Bol (NED)	Team Sunweb	+ 0"
9	Alexander Kristoff (NOR)	UAE Team Emirates	+ 0"
10	Warren Barguil (FRA)	Arkéa–Samsic	+ 0"

General classification after stage 11
Rank	Rider	Team	Time
1	Julian Alaphilippe (FRA)	Deceuninck–Quick-Step	47h 18' 41"
2	Geraint Thomas (GBR)	Team Ineos	+ 1' 12"
3	Egan Bernal (COL)	Team Ineos	+ 1' 16"
4	Steven Kruijswijk (NED)	Team Jumbo–Visma	+ 1' 27"
5	Emanuel Buchmann (GER)	Bora–Hansgrohe	+ 1' 45"
6	Enric Mas (ESP)	Deceuninck–Quick-Step	+ 1' 46"
7	Adam Yates (GBR)	Mitchelton–Scott	+ 1' 47"
8	Nairo Quintana (COL)	Movistar Team	+ 2' 04"
9	Dan Martin (IRL)	UAE Team Emirates	+ 2' 09"
10	Thibaut Pinot (FRA)	Groupama–FDJ	+ 2' 33"
