= 2019 Tour de France =

106th edition of cycling Grand Tour

2019 UCI World Tour, race 27 of 38
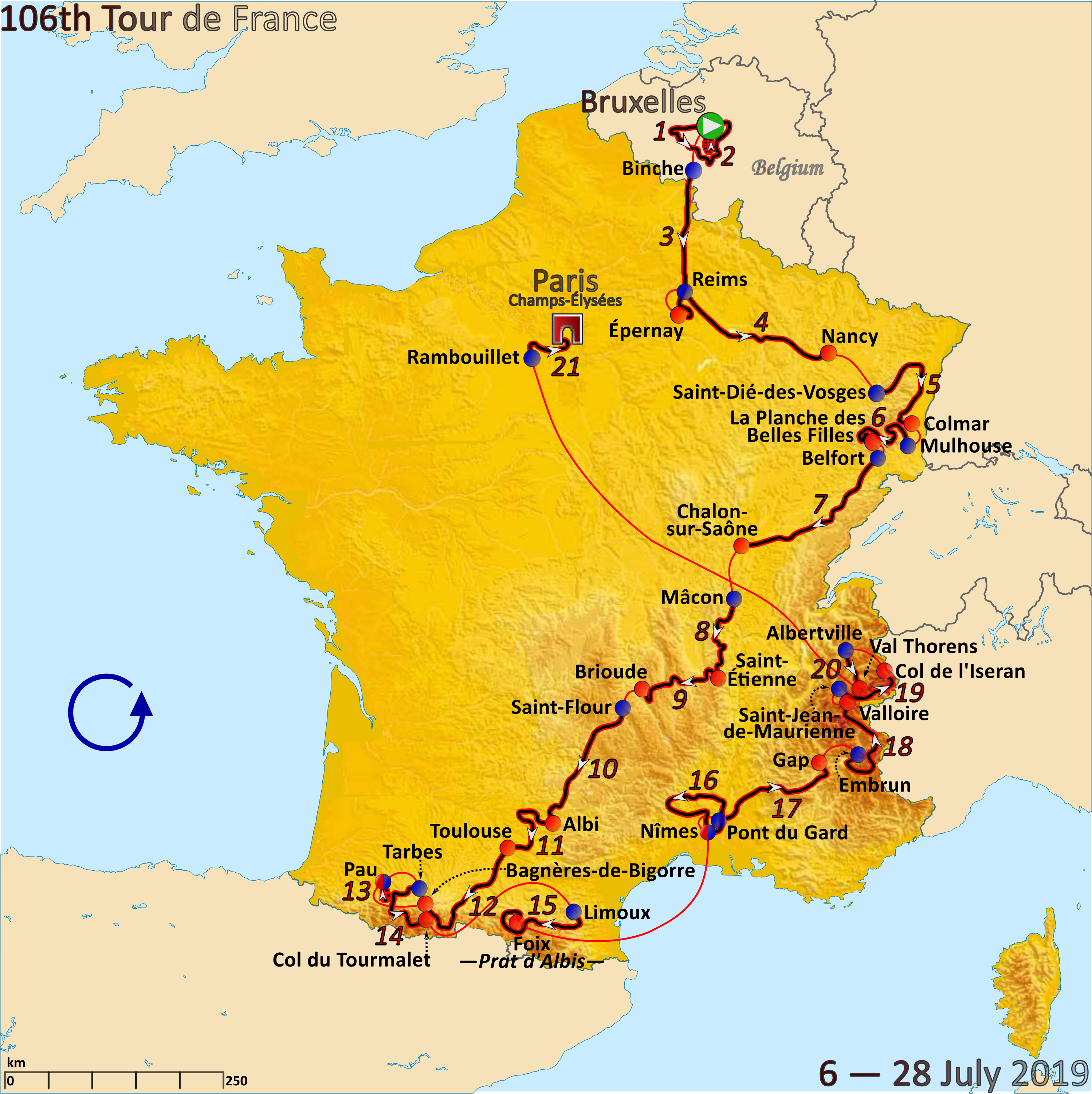
- Route of the 2019 Tour de France

Race details
- Dates: 6–28 July 2019
- Stages: 21
- Distance: 3,365.8 km (2,091.4 mi)
- Winning time: 82h 57' 00"

Results
Jersey awarded to the overall winner	Winner	Egan Bernal (COL)	(Team INEOS)
	Second	Geraint Thomas (GBR)	(Team INEOS)
	Third	Steven Kruijswijk (NED)	(Team Jumbo–Visma)
Jersey awarded to the points classification winner	Points	Peter Sagan (SVK)	(Bora–Hansgrohe)
Jersey awarded to the mountains classification winner	Mountains	Romain Bardet (FRA)	(AG2R La Mondiale)
Jersey awarded to the young rider classification winner	Young rider	Egan Bernal (COL)	(Team INEOS)
Jersey awarded to the combativity classification winner	Combativity	Julian Alaphilippe (FRA)	(Deceuninck–Quick-Step)
Jersey awarded to the team classification winner	Team	(Spain) Movistar Team	

The 2019 Tour de France was the 106th edition of the Tour de France, one of cycling's three Grand Tours. The 3,365.8 km (2,091 mi)-long race consisted of 21 stages, starting in the Belgian capital of Brussels on 6 July, before moving throughout France and concluding on the Champs-Élysées in Paris on 28 July. A total of 176 riders from 22 teams participated in the race. The overall general classification was won for the first time by a Latin American rider, Egan Bernal of Team INEOS. His teammate and 2018 Tour winner Geraint Thomas finished second while Steven Kruijswijk (Team Jumbo–Visma) came in third.

Kruijswijk's teammate Mike Teunissen won stage 1's bunch sprint to take the first yellow jersey of the Tour. Julian Alaphilippe of Deceuninck–Quick-Step took the lead of the race following his victory of stage 3. He lost the yellow jersey after the sixth stage to Giulio Ciccone (Trek–Segafredo) who was the highest placed rider of a breakaway group that finished ahead of the peloton (main group). Ciccone's lead of the Tour lasted two stages, before Alaphilippe retook it after stage 8. Against expectations, he held the yellow jersey for the next eleven stages, including the Pyrenees, before losing it to Bernal on the second day in the Alps, stage 19, which was shortened by inclement weather. Bernal held his lead in the final two stages to win the Tour.

The points classification was won by Bora–Hansgrohe's Peter Sagan for a record seventh time, with Romain Bardet of AG2R La Mondiale winning the mountains classification. Bernal also won the young rider classification. The team classification was won by Movistar Team and Alaphilippe was named the overall most combative rider. Caleb Ewan of Lotto–Soudal won the most stages, with three.

== Teams ==
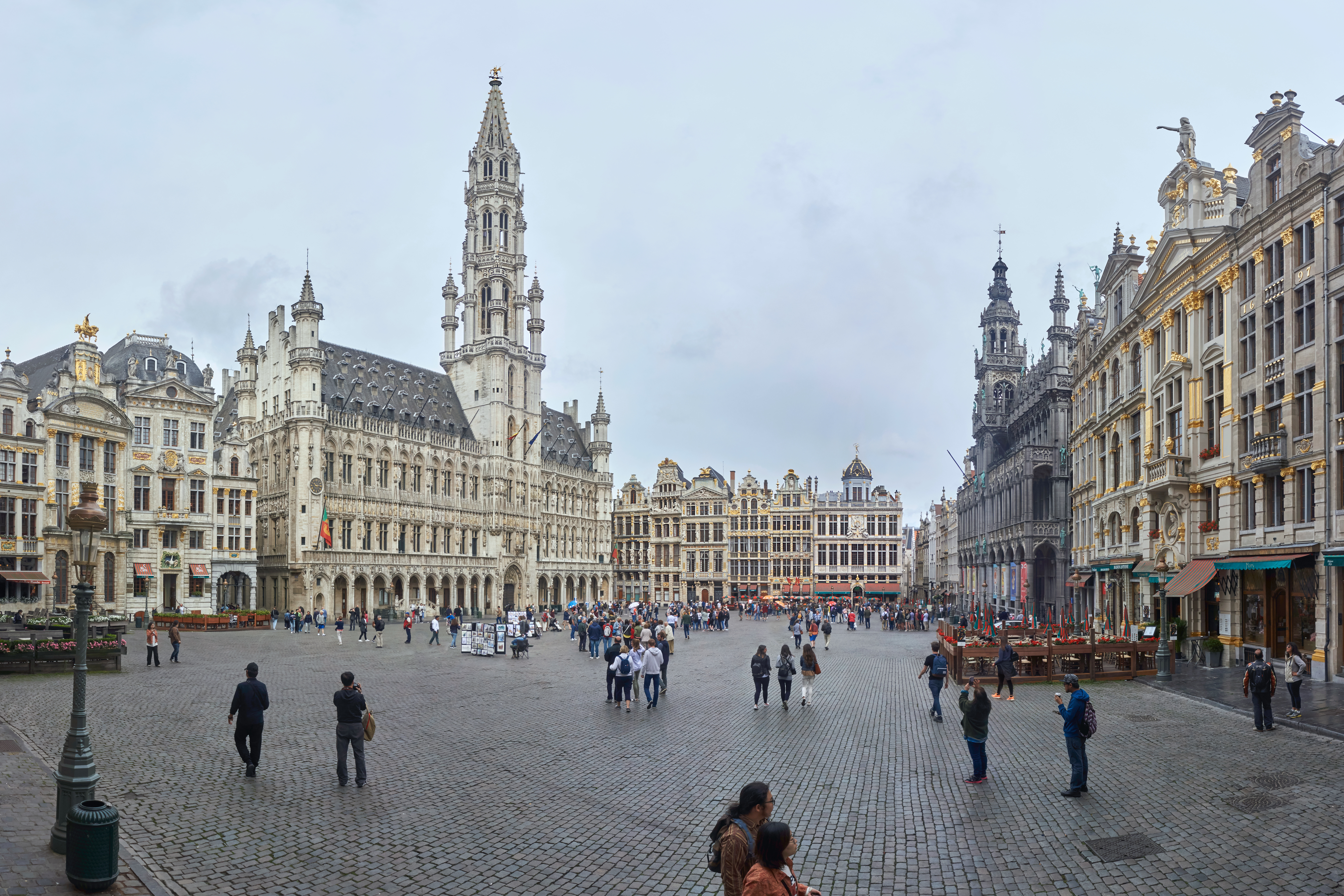
The Grand-Place square in Brussels, Belgium, hosted the team presentation ceremony on 4 July.

The 2019 edition of the Tour de France consisted of 22 teams. The race was the 27th of the 38 events in the UCI World Tour, and all of its 18 UCI WorldTeams were entitled, and obliged, to enter the race. Additionally, Amaury Sport Organisation (ASO), the organisers of the Tour, invited four second-tier UCI Professional Continental teams to participate in the event. The three French and one Belgian teams had each participated in the race before. The presentation of the teams – where the members of each team's roster are introduced in front of the media and local dignitaries – took place in front of a crowd of 75,000 on the Grand-Place square in Brussels, Belgium, on 4 July, two days before the opening stage.

Each squad was allowed a maximum of eight riders, resulting in a start list total of 176. Of these, 33 competed in their first Tour de France. The riders came from 30 countries. Six countries had more than ten riders in the race: France (43), Belgium (21), Italy (15), Spain (13), Germany (11) and the Netherlands (11). The average age of riders in the race was 29.71 years, ranging from the 21-year-old Jasper Philipsen (UAE Team Emirates) to the 39-year-old Lars Bak (Team Dimension Data). Team Sunweb had the youngest average age while Team Dimension Data had the oldest.

The teams participating in the race were:

UCI WorldTeams

- AG2R La Mondiale
- Astana
- Bahrain–Merida
- Bora–Hansgrohe
- CCC Team
- EF Education First
- Team Dimension Data
- Groupama–FDJ
- Team INEOS
- Team Katusha–Alpecin
- Team Jumbo–Visma
- Lotto–Soudal
- Movistar Team
- Mitchelton–Scott
- Deceuninck–Quick-Step
- Team Sunweb
- Trek–Segafredo
- UAE Team Emirates

UCI Professional Continental teams

- Cofidis
- Wanty–Gobert
- Total Direct Énergie
- Arkéa–Samsic

== Pre-race favourites ==
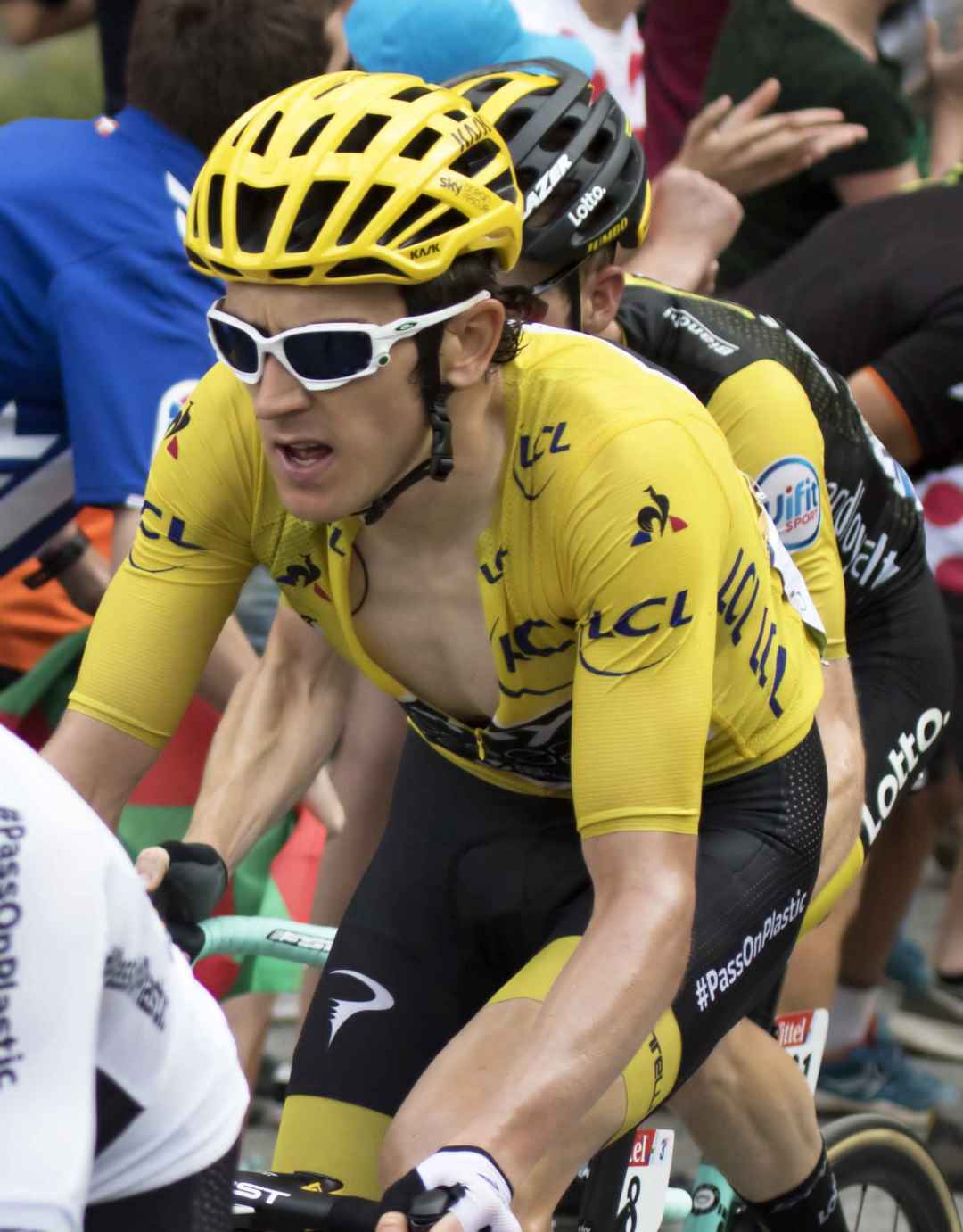
Geraint Thomas (pictured at the 2018 Tour de France) returned to defend his title.

Pre-race predictions in the media, as well as the bookmakers, on the general classification were drastically altered when four-time Tour winner Chris Froome (Team INEOS) was ruled out with multiple injuries following his crash at the Critérium du Dauphiné three weeks before the Tour. Although he was third overall behind teammate and winner Geraint Thomas in the previous year's Tour, Froome was considered the 2019 Tour favourite before his crash. Prior to Froome's withdrawal, there was no official announcement by Team INEOS on leadership for the Tour, which could have potentially been shared between himself, Thomas and Egan Bernal. Another major absentee was the 2018 Tour runner-up Tom Dumoulin (Team Sunweb), who missed the Tour with a knee injury he picked up at the Giro d'Italia, the Grand Tour of Italy that took place a month before the Tour de France, and a race he won in 2017. With their absence, the Tour was expected to be a more open race, with Thomas and Bernal as the leading contenders. Their closest rivals were thought to be Romain Bardet (AG2R La Mondiale), Jakob Fuglsang (Astana), Steven Kruijswijk (Team Jumbo–Visma), Mikel Landa (Movistar Team), Vincenzo Nibali (Bahrain–Merida), Thibaut Pinot (Groupama–FDJ), Nairo Quintana (Movistar Team) and Adam Yates (Mitchelton–Scott).

After celebrating his 2018 Tour victory, Thomas was overweight at the start of the 2019 season. His only result of note before the Tour was a third-place overall finish at the Tour de Romandie in early May. In June he abandoned the Tour de Suisse following a crash, and required recovery time, which put his ability to perform at the Tour in doubt. Bernal made his Tour debut in 2018 riding as a domestique (leader's assistant) for Froome and Thomas, who are ten years his senior. In the 2019 season, he was planned to lead his team's Giro squad, but missed the race after he broke his collarbone. His major wins of the season up to the Tour were the Paris–Nice stage race before his injury and the Tour de Suisse on his return. In the Tour, he was to share the leadership with Thomas according to the team, although some in the media expected an internal battle between the two.

Bardet had finished on the podium twice in his career, second in 2016 and third in 2017. His form was lacking in the build up to the Tour, although his experience and the consistency of his previous performances in the race were considered enough to make him a serious contender. Fuglsang was the most in-form contender, enjoying a successful spring classics campaign, including victory in the prestigious "monument" one-day race Liège–Bastogne–Liège as well as the stage races Vuelta a Andalucía and the Dauphiné. Fuglsang was thought likely to benefit from a strong team, but doubt was cast on his ability to perform over a three-week Grand Tour, as he had never finished in the top three places in a Grand Tour. That too was the case with Kruijswijk, who had performed well in the season and was considered a top contender, despite suffering with illness leading up to the Tour. Landa's form was considered harder to predict, as he had stayed away from racing after the Giro, where he just missed out on a podium place. His best overall result in the Tour so far had been in 2017, when he finished fourth riding as a domestique to Froome.

Veteran rider Nibali had no wins so far in 2019, but placed second overall at the Giro and was considered to be a danger due to his experience. He was the only rider on the start list apart from Thomas to have won a Tour, the 2014 edition. Pinot was also considered to be in form after finishing fifth overall in the Dauphiné, and before that, winning the general classification of the non-World Tour Tour de l'Ain and Tour du Haut Var. It was however speculated that the pressure of being a home favourite could affect him negatively, as well having issues with heat. His previous results in the Tour had been mixed: he had finished third in 2014, but had dropped out of the race twice since then. Quintana, a two-time Grand Tour winner, was seen as a podium contender. Yates returned to the race after finishing 29th overall the previous year. Although he withdrew from the Dauphiné a few weeks earlier for illness, he had been in good form before then.

Other riders expected to place high in the general classification were Emanuel Buchmann (Red Bull–Bora–Hansgrohe), Dan Martin (UAE Team Emirates), Enric Mas (Deceuninck–Quick-Step), Richie Porte (Trek–Segafredo), Rigoberto Urán and Tejay van Garderen (both EF Education First), Alejandro Valverde (Movistar Team) and Ilnur Zakarin (Team Katusha–Alpecin).

The 2018 winner of the points classification, Peter Sagan (Red Bull–Bora–Hansgrohe), returned to defend his title in an attempt to break Erik Zabel's record of six wins. Before the Tour he shared the record with Zabel, after winning the classification in six out of the past seven editions. Sagan was regarded as the clear favourite for winning the points classification. The riders thought to be Sagan's biggest rivals were Caleb Ewan (Lotto–Soudal), Dylan Groenewegen (Team Jumbo–Visma), Michael Matthews (Team Sunweb) and Elia Viviani (Deceuninck–Quick-Step). Other contenders for the green jersey were Julian Alaphilippe (Deceuninck–Quick-Step), Edvald Boasson Hagen (Team Dimension Data), Alexander Kristoff (UAE Team Emirates) and Wout van Aert (Team Jumbo–Visma).

== Route and stages ==
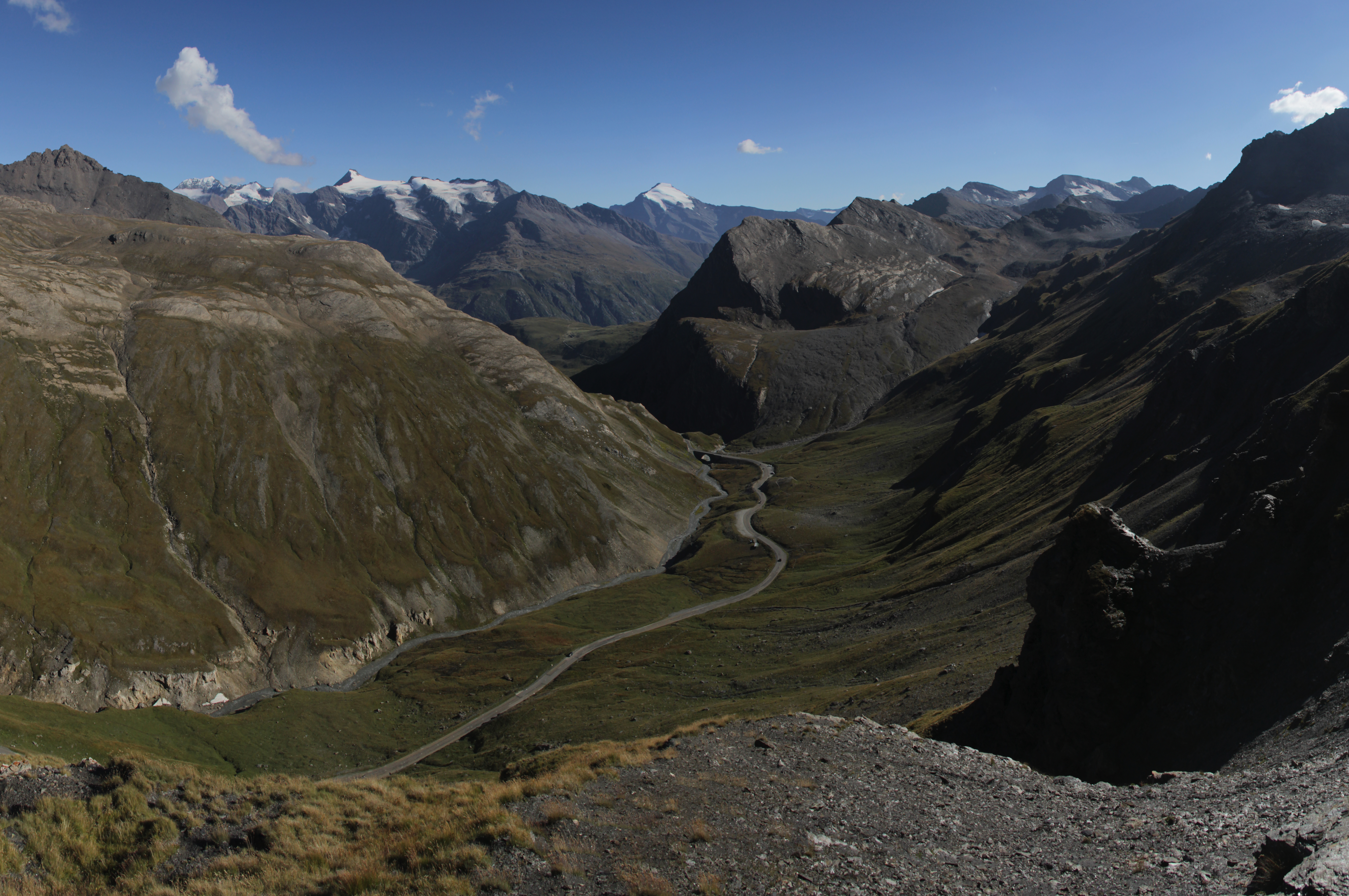
At an altitude of 2,770 m (9,090 ft), the summit of the Col de l'Iseran mountain pass (viewed southwards from the summit) on stage 19 is the highest paved pass in the Alps.

On 30 May 2017, the ASO announced that Brussels would host the 2019 edition's opening stages (known as the Grand Départ), honouring one of the Tour's most successful riders, Belgian Eddy Merckx, on the 50th anniversary of his first of five overall victories. It was the second time the Grand Départ had taken place in Brussels and was the fifth Belgian Grand Départ. It also marked 100 years since the race leader's yellow jersey was first seen at a Tour. Further details of the Grand Départ were revealed on 16 January 2018: the opening stage that featured the Muur van Geraardsbergen climb, an iconic steep cobbled climb of the Tour of Flanders "monument" race, and a second stage team time trial around the streets of Brussels. The entire route, which the race director Christian Prudhomme described as "the highest Tour in history", was unveiled on 25 October 2018.

The opening stage visited Charleroi and looped back to Brussels, to connect the regions of Flanders and Wallonia in a stage. Starting in Binche, the third stage left Belgium for France, with the following stage taking the race to the north-east to the Vosges Mountains for two further stages. The transitional stage 7 moved the Tour south-west and towards the Massif Central highland region, with stage 8 ending in the city of Saint-Étienne. Stages 9 and 10 traversed the Massif Central, before the Tour's first rest day. The following two stages moved the race to the Pyrenees, which hosted four stages. After the second rest day, the Tour took a long transfer east for stage 16, finishing in Nîmes. Stage 17 took the race up to the Alps at Gap. After three Alpine stages, an air transfer moved the Tour to the outskirts of Paris, ending with the Champs-Élysées stage.

There were 21 stages in the race, covering a total distance of 3,365.8 km (2,091 mi). There were two time trial events, stage 2's 27.6 km (17 mi) team time trial and stage 13's 27.2 km (17 mi) individual time trial. Of the remaining nineteen stages, seven were officially classified as flat, five as hilly and seven as mountainous. The longest mass-start stage was stage 7, at 230 km (143 mi), and the shortest was stage 14, at 117.5 km (73 mi). The route contained five mountain-top finishes: stage 6, to La Planche des Belles Filles; stages 14, to the Col du Tourmalet; stage 15, to Foix; stage 19, to Col de l'Iseran; (Note: During the descent of the Col de l'Iseran mountain pass on stage 19, the race was neutralised when a hailstorm caused ice and landslides to block the route to the final climb to Tignes, particularly a mudslide at the foot of the descent before Val-d'Isère. Times for the general classification were taken at the summit of the l'Iseran, but the stage did not award a winner, time bonuses or most combative rider. Egan Bernal had the fastest time taken at this point. The stage was shortened from 126.5 km (79 mi) to 89 km (55 mi).) and stage 20, to Val Thorens. The Iseran mountain pass, the highest paved pass in Europe, featured on stage 19. This was the seventh time that the Tour climbed the 2,770 m (9,090 ft) Iseran, but only the second ascent from the more difficult southern side. It was among five hors catégorie (beyond category) rated climbs in the race. Of the 34 stage start or finish hosts, the race visited Binche, Saint-Dié-des-Vosges and Pont du Gard for the first time.

Stage characteristics and winners
Stage	Date	Course	Distance	Type	Winner
1	6 July	Brussels (Belgium) to Brussels (Belgium) via Charleroi (Belgium)	194.5 km (121 mi)	Flat stage	Mike Teunissen (NED)
2	7 July	Brussels-Royal Palace (Belgium) to Brussels-Atomium (Belgium)	27.6 km (17 mi)	Team time trial	Team Jumbo–Visma (NED)
3	8 July	Binche (Belgium) to Épernay	215 km (134 mi)	Hilly stage	Julian Alaphilippe (FRA)
4	9 July	Reims to Nancy	213.5 km (133 mi)	Flat stage	Elia Viviani (ITA)
5	10 July	Saint-Dié-des-Vosges to Colmar	175.5 km (109 mi)	Hilly stage	Peter Sagan (SVK)
6	11 July	Mulhouse to La Planche des Belles Filles	160.5 km (100 mi)	Mountain stage	Dylan Teuns (BEL)
7	12 July	Belfort to Chalon-sur-Saône	230 km (143 mi)	Flat stage	Dylan Groenewegen (NED)
8	13 July	Mâcon to Saint-Étienne	200 km (124 mi)	Hilly stage	Thomas De Gendt (BEL)
9	14 July	Saint-Étienne to Brioude	170.5 km (106 mi)	Hilly stage	Daryl Impey (RSA)
10	15 July	Saint-Flour to Albi	217.5 km (135 mi)	Flat stage	Wout van Aert (BEL)
	16 July	Albi		Rest day	
11	17 July	Albi to Toulouse	167 km (104 mi)	Flat stage	Caleb Ewan (AUS)
12	18 July	Toulouse to Bagnères-de-Bigorre	209.5 km (130 mi)	Mountain stage	Simon Yates (GBR)
13	19 July	Pau to Pau	27.2 km (17 mi)	Individual time trial	Julian Alaphilippe (FRA)
14	20 July	Tarbes to Col du Tourmalet	111 km (69 mi)	Mountain stage	Thibaut Pinot (FRA)
15	21 July	Limoux to Foix Prat d'Albis	185 km (115 mi)	Mountain stage	Simon Yates (GBR)
	22 July	Nîmes		Rest day	
16	23 July	Nîmes to Nîmes	177 km (110 mi)	Flat stage	Caleb Ewan (AUS)
17	24 July	Pont du Gard to Gap	200 km (124 mi)	Hilly stage	Matteo Trentin (ITA)
18	25 July	Embrun to Valloire	208 km (129 mi)	Mountain stage	Nairo Quintana (COL)
19	26 July	Saint-Jean-de-Maurienne to Col de l'Iseran	89 km (55 mi)	Mountain stage	no winner
20	27 July	Albertville to Val Thorens	59.5 km (37 mi) (Note: The route of stage 20 was modified the day before to avoid road sections made unusable by landslides. The new route bypassed the first-category Cormet de Roselend and second-category Côte de Longefoy, reducing the stage distance from 130 km (81 mi) to 59.5 km (37 mi).)	Mountain stage	Vincenzo Nibali (ITA)
21	28 July	Rambouillet to Paris (Champs-Élysées)	128 km (80 mi)	Flat stage	Caleb Ewan (AUS)
	Total		3,365.8 km (2,091 mi)		

== Race overview ==
=== First week: Belgium, north-eastern to southern France ===
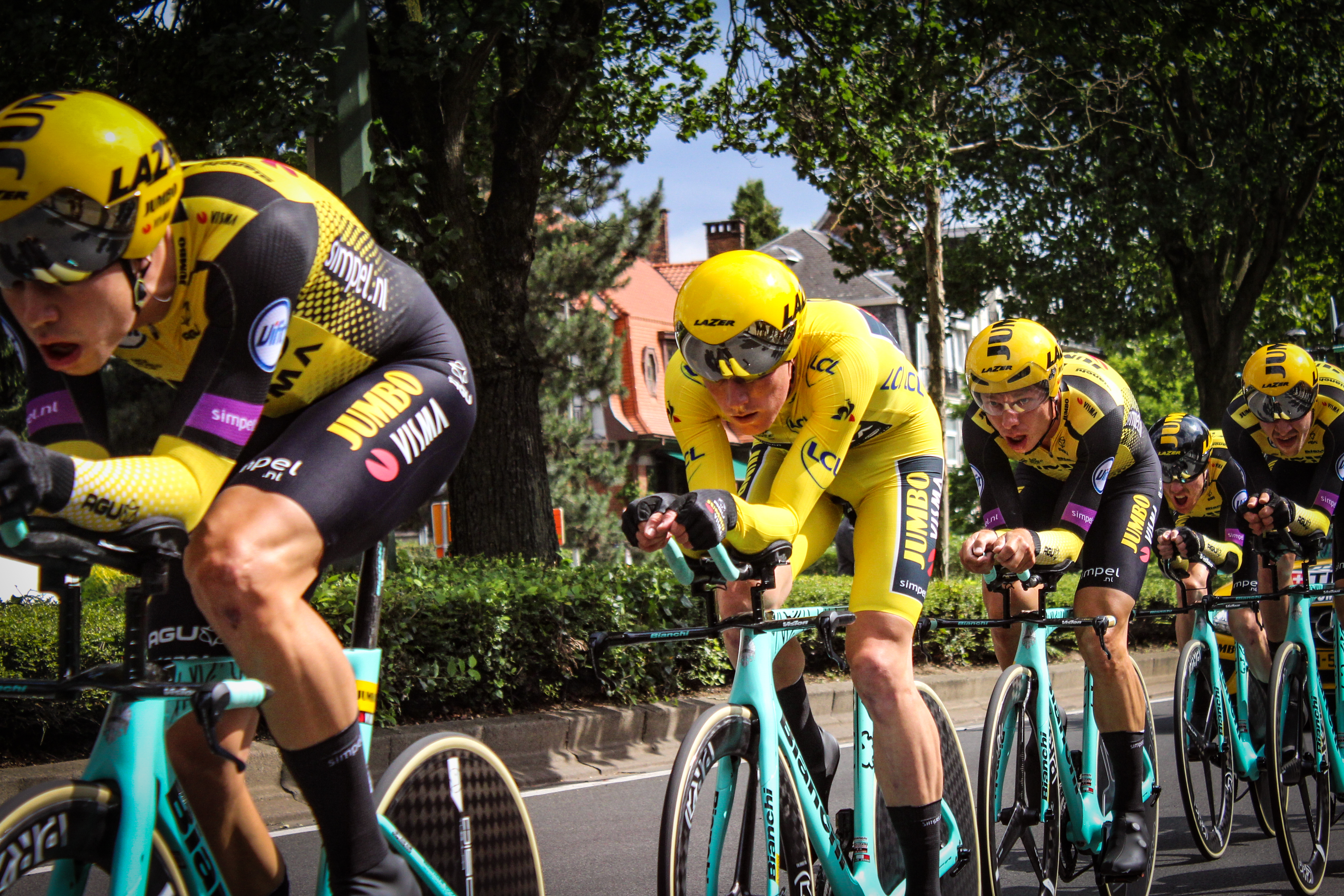
Team Jumbo–Visma's Mike Teunissen (centre) during stage two's team time trial, wearing the general classification leader's yellow jersey following his unexpected victory of the opening stage

Stage 1's bunch sprint finish was won by Team Jumbo–Visma's Mike Teunissen. He was initially a member of the team's sprint train who were leading out their designated sprinter Dylan Groenewegen, but following Groenewegen's crash in the closing 2 km (1.2 mi), Teunissen was free to race in the sprint. He took the first yellow and green jerseys as the leader of the general and points classifications respectively. Early in the stage, Greg Van Avermaet (CCC Team) led the breakaway group over the highest categorised climb of the stage, the third-category Muur van Geraardsbergen, claiming the lead in the mountains classification and the first polka dot jersey as the leader of the classification. (Note: On stage 1, Greg Van Avermaet got two points for crossing the summit of the third-category Muur van Geraardsbergen in first place, with Xandro Meurisse (Wanty–Gobert) getting one point for coming second. Meurisse then got a further point for being first over the fourth-category Bosberg, the only other categorised climb. Although they both ended the stage with two points, Van Avermaet was given the lead in the mountains classification, as the Muur van Geraardsbergen was higher-categorised.)

Teunissen increased his overall lead in the race following his team's victory in stage 2's team time trial, finishing twenty seconds ahead of second-placed Team INEOS. However, his hold on the yellow jersey was short lived after the following day's hilly stage when he lost the race lead to Julian Alaphilippe, who launched a solo attack with 16 km (9.9 mi) to go over the final climb, the third-category Côte de Mutigny, catching and passing the remainder of the breakaway to win the stage. Peter Sagan and Tim Wellens (Lotto–Soudal) took the green and polka dot jerseys respectively. The following day's flat stage ended in a bunch sprint won by Elia Viviani.

The climbs of stage 5 did not cause trouble to the race, as most of the stage contenders retained their energy for the following stage's steep finish of the first-category Planche des Belles Filles climb. An early four-man breakaway, which included mountains classification leader Wellens, was caught well before the sprint bunch finish, won by Sagan. The mountainous stage 6 saw a 14-strong breakaway gain a lead of more than 8 minutes. By the second-category Col des Chevrères, only four riders remained. Wellens and Xandro Meurisse (Wanty–Gobert), the former having secured his polka dot jersey for another day, were distanced on the final climb by Dylan Teuns (Bahrain–Merida) and Giulio Ciccone (Trek–Segafredo). Teuns went on to win the stage, and despite Ciccone fading before Teuns in the final metres of the climb he managed to take over the yellow jersey, as the strongest of the peloton (main group) came in over one and a half minutes behind, with former leader Alaphilippe standing six seconds down in second place. The final 500 m (1,640 ft) also proved to be a difficulty for general classification contenders Vincenzo Nibali, Richie Porte and Romain Bardet, who lost time on the climb.

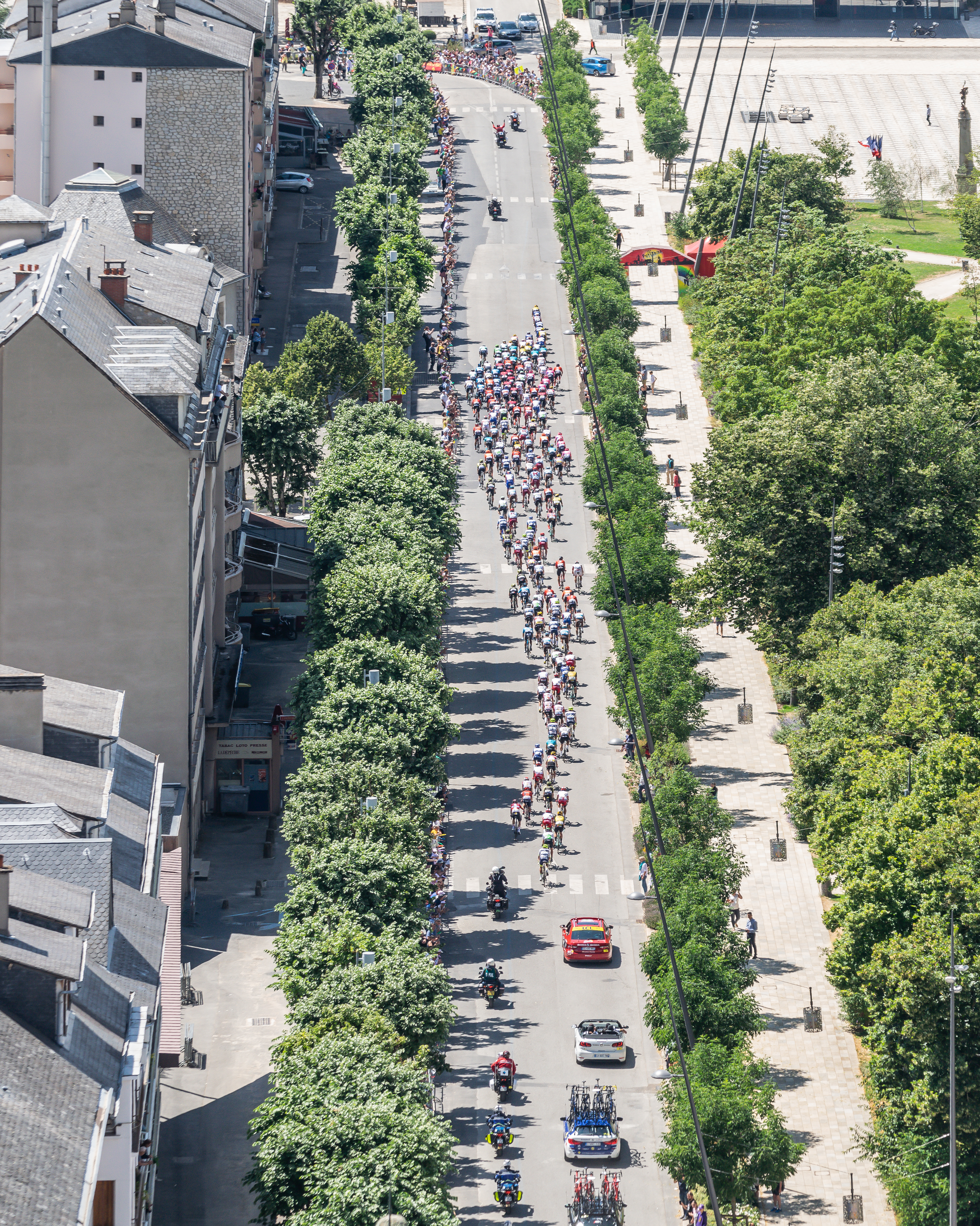
The peloton passing through the city of Rodez on the tenth stage, before crosswinds caused a reduced bunch sprint finish, won by Wout van Aert

Stage 7, returning to the flat after the Vosges Mountains, was uneventful, with the breakaway being held by the peloton to only a few minutes, and despite early crashes by Tejay van Garderen and Teunissen, ended in a technical bunch sprint won by Groenewegen. The Tour began its traverse of the Massif Central with stage 8; with close to 4,000 m (13,000 ft) of elevation gain, it was seen before the race as a potential win from a breakaway, which on the day had four riders. As the successive climbs were passed, this number was gradually reduced, with only Thomas De Gendt (Lotto–Soudal) and Alessandro De Marchi (CCC Team) surviving until the final climb, on which De Gendt successfully distanced him. With the breakaway duo's advantage down to under a minute in the final kilometres, Alaphilippe and Thibault Pinot attacked and gained twenty seconds on the much reduced peloton, as De Gendt managed to hold on for the stage victory, with Alaphilippe regaining his yellow jersey. Defending champion Geraint Thomas survived his second crash in this edition of the Tour.

Stage 9 saw an early 15-strong breakaway form, which the peloton let go. At the 40 km (24.9 mi) to go mark, Lukas Pöstlberger of Bora–Hansgrohe escaped the breakaway until 15 km (9.3 mi) from the finish on the final climb of the third-category Côte de Saint-Just. Following this, a leading trio emerged, consisting of Nicolas Roche (Team Sunweb), Tiesj Benoot (Lotto–Soudal) and Daryl Impey (Mitchelton–Scott). Roche was dropped before the finish, leaving the victory to Impey who overcame Benoot in the final sprint, in a day which otherwise saw no significant changes in the overall standings.

The tenth stage was on relatively flat terrain. With 30 km (18.6 mi) remaining, splits occurred in the peloton as Team INEOS and others took to the front and broke the field apart in strong crosswinds. This effort proved decisive, as several overall contenders who were caught behind, including Pinot, Richie Porte, Rigoberto Urán, Jakob Fuglsang and Mikel Landa, lost time on the front group. Thomas, Egan Bernal, Alaphilippe and Bardet maintained their position at the front of the race, amongst a reduced bunch. The victory went to Wout van Aert, as several of the main sprinters were caught behind, including his Team Jumbo–Visma teammate Groenewegen.

By the first rest day, which was a day later than usual, the general classification was led by Alaphilippe, who had a lead of 1' 12" on Thomas, behind whom was Bernal in third place, just 4" from Thomas. Home favourite Pinot, despite being 1' 21" back from Thomas in eleventh place, was considered by his directeur sportif Marc Madiot to still be in contention. In the points classification, pre-race favourite Sagan was in first position, already 62 points ahead of second-placed Michael Matthews. The mountains classification was more closely contested, with breakaway riders and Lotto–Soudal teammates Wellens and De Gendt respectively first and second, with a gap of six points.

=== Second week: Southern France and Pyrenees ===
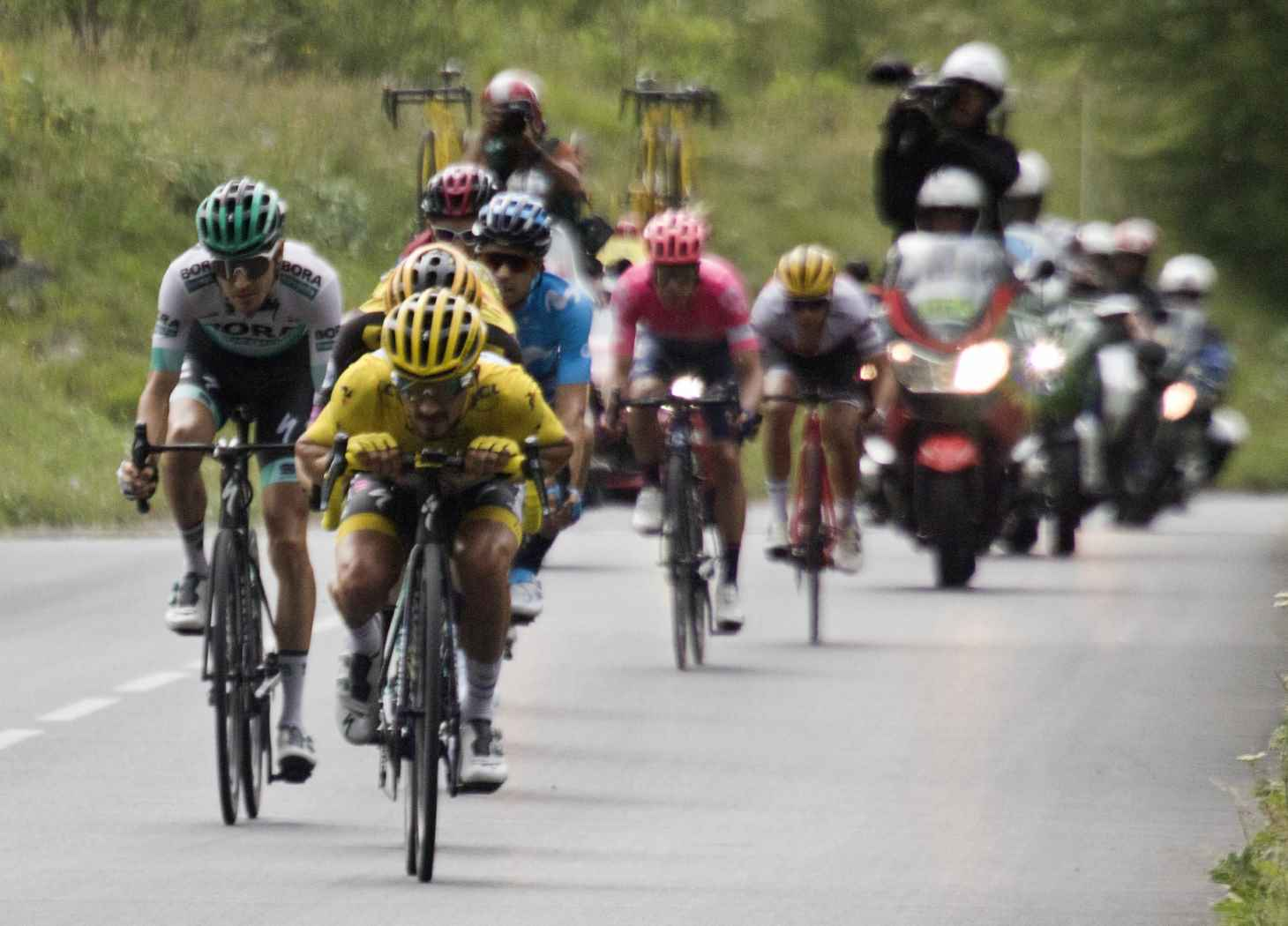
Julian Alaphilippe (pictured on stage 18) held the yellow jersey for a total of fourteen stages of the Tour.

Stage 11's small breakaway was caught with 5 km (3.1 mi) remaining, before Caleb Ewan won the bunch sprint finish. The first Pyrenean stage, the twelfth, saw a 42-rider breakaway reduce to a group of Simon Yates (Mitchelton–Scott), Pello Bilbao (Astana) and Gregor Mühlberger (Bora–Hansgrohe) on the final climb of La Hourquette d'Ancizan, the second of the stage's two first-category climbs. The trio descended to the finish at Bagnères-de-Bigorre, where Yates won the sprint. The majority of the peloton came in close to ten minutes after. A notable abandonment of the stage, for personal reasons, was the reigning world time trial champion Rohan Dennis (Bahrain–Merida), a favourite for the following day's time trial.

In the aforementioned stage, Alaphilippe took the victory, with a time of 35' 00" across the 27.2 km (17 mi) course, achieving a victory on a day where he was expected to lose time to riders such as Thomas, who ended up in second place, fourteen seconds down. Wout van Aert, one of the favourites for the stage, had to abandon the race during the time trial after he crashed, having clipped a barrier on the side of the road.

On stage 14, the last of the breakaway riders were caught by the leading group of general classification contenders at 10 km (6.2 mi) before the finish atop the hors catégorie Col du Tourmalet. With 1 km (0.62 mi) remaining, Thomas got detached from the lead group containing Alaphilippe, Emanuel Buchmann, Pinot, Bernal, Landa and Steven Kruijswijk. Pinot attacked in the final 250 m (270 yd) and held his lead to the finish line at the summit.

On the final stage in the Pyrenees, Simon Yates took his second stage win of the race from a reduced breakaway of six at the summit of the 11.8 km (7.3 mi) first-category climb to Prat d'Albis. Pinot attacked the group of general classification contenders with 6 km (3.7 mi) remaining to finish in second place with Landa, 33 seconds behind, progressing to fourth overall. The duo of Bernal and Buchmann came in 33' down, followed by the last few breakaway riders, and then the group of favourites, led by Thomas, who finished 1' 22" behind Yates.

The following day was the Tour's second rest day. By this point, overall race leader Alaphilippe was exceeding expectations, with a 1' 35" lead over Thomas. Kruijswijk was third at 1' 47", followed by Pinot, Bernal and Buchmann respectively. The green jersey was still held by Sagan, who now had a lead of 85 points over second-placed Viviani, while the mountains classification was still led by Wellens.

=== Third week: Southern France, Alps and finale in Paris ===
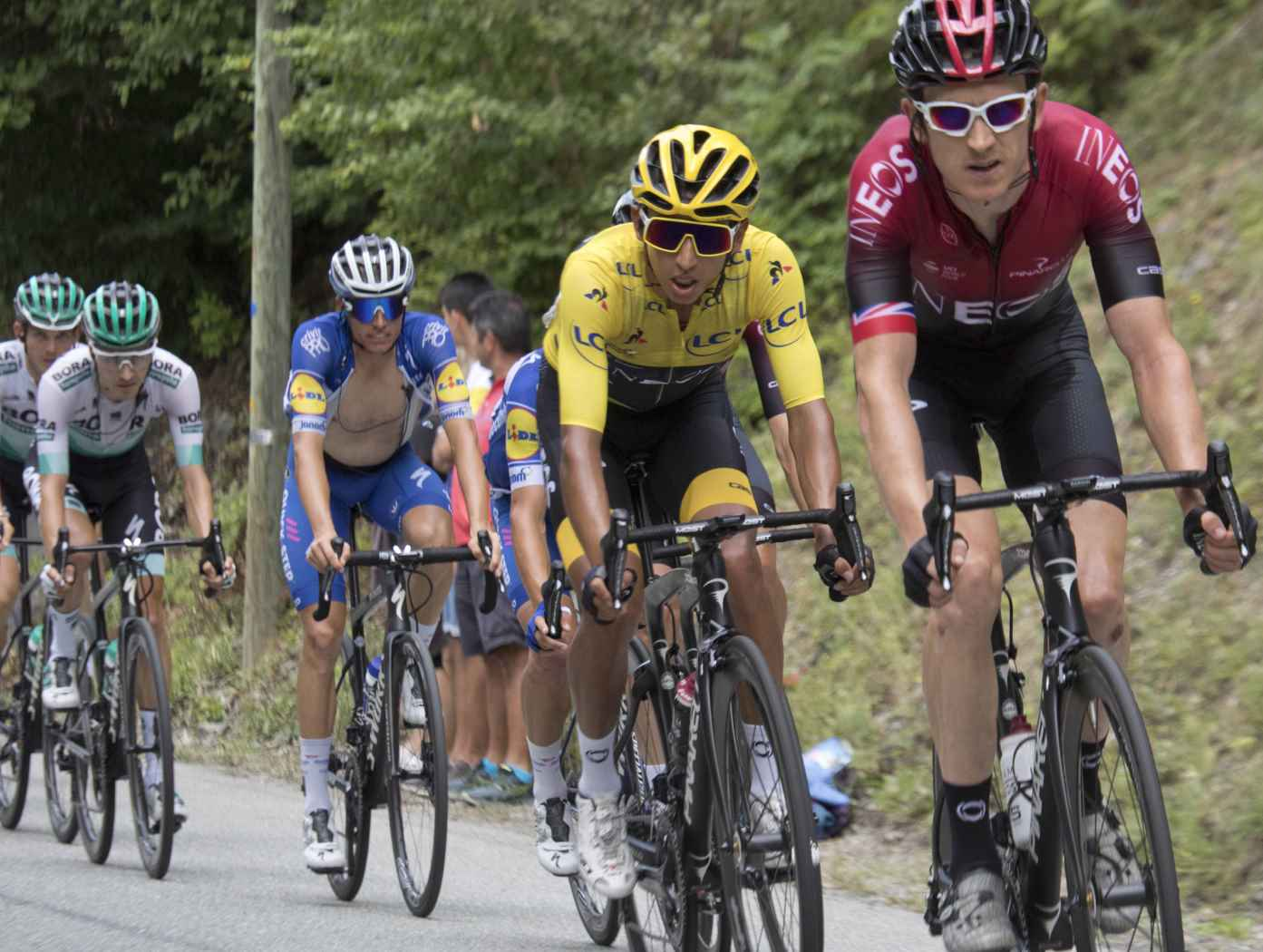
2018 Tour winner Geraint Thomas leading Team INEOS teammate and eventual 2019 Tour winner Egan Bernal on the penultimate stage

As the Tour came down from the Pyrenees for transitional stages towards the Alps, it experienced the beginning of the July 2019 European heat wave, which saw temperatures reach a high of 35 °C (95 °F) during stage 16. Ewan won the stage from a bunch sprint in Nîmes, his second of the Tour. Crashes during the stage included overall favourites Thomas and Fuglsang, with the latter forced to abandon. In the following stage, the 33-rider breakaway's advantage grew to 15 minutes at one point. Matteo Trentin of Mitchelton–Scott attacked a reduced breakaway with 40 km (25 mi) from the finish on the final climb, the third-category Côte de la Sentinelle, and soloed to victory with lead of 37 seconds, with peloton over 20 minutes behind. Luke Rowe (Team INEOS) and Tony Martin (Team Jumbo–Visma) were both disqualified from the Tour following an altercation near the front of the peloton in the latter part of the stage.

Stage 18, the first in the Alps, was led by breakaway riders throughout the stage's climbs, which included the first-category Col de Vars and the hors catégorie Col d'Izoard and Col du Galibier. The 34-strong breakaway had been reduced to a group of elite riders by the foot of the Galibier, the final climb. Nairo Quintana attacked with 7.5 km (4.7 mi) still to climb, and by the summit had built a lead of over a minute and a half, which he held on the descent to the finish. Meanwhile, with 2 km (1.2 mi) remaining of the Galibier, Bernal attacked from within the group of general classification contenders containing Alaphilippe and Thomas, allowing Bernal to recover half a minute on his rivals by the finish and move up to second overall. The lead of the mountains classification went to Romain Bardet, who was a pre-race favourite for the yellow jersey but moved out of contention after losing 20 minutes on stage 14's Col du Tourmalet, thereafter switching focus to breakaway rides.

Around 40 km (25 mi) into stage 19, Pinot, who had been placed fifth in the general classification, abandoned the race with a leg muscle injury. At the head of the race in the closing kilometres of the planned second to last climb, the hors catégorie Col de l'Iseran, Bernal attacked from the group of overall contenders, catching and passing final breakaway riders by the summit. Next over the top were breakers Simon Yates and Warren Barguil (Arkéa–Samsic), one minute behind Bernal, with the yellow jersey contenders following. Alaphilippe was dropped following Bernal's attack, and was two minutes behind at the summit. During the descent, the race was neutralised when a hailstorm caused ice and landslides to block the route to the final climb to Tignes, particularly a mudslide at the foot of the descent before Val-d'Isère. Times for the general classification were taken at the summit of the Iseran, with the stage victory and most combative rider of the day not awarded. As a result, Bernal, who had been in second place overall, moved ahead of Alaphilippe and took the yellow jersey. The stage was shortened from 126.5 km (79 mi) to 89 km (55 mi).

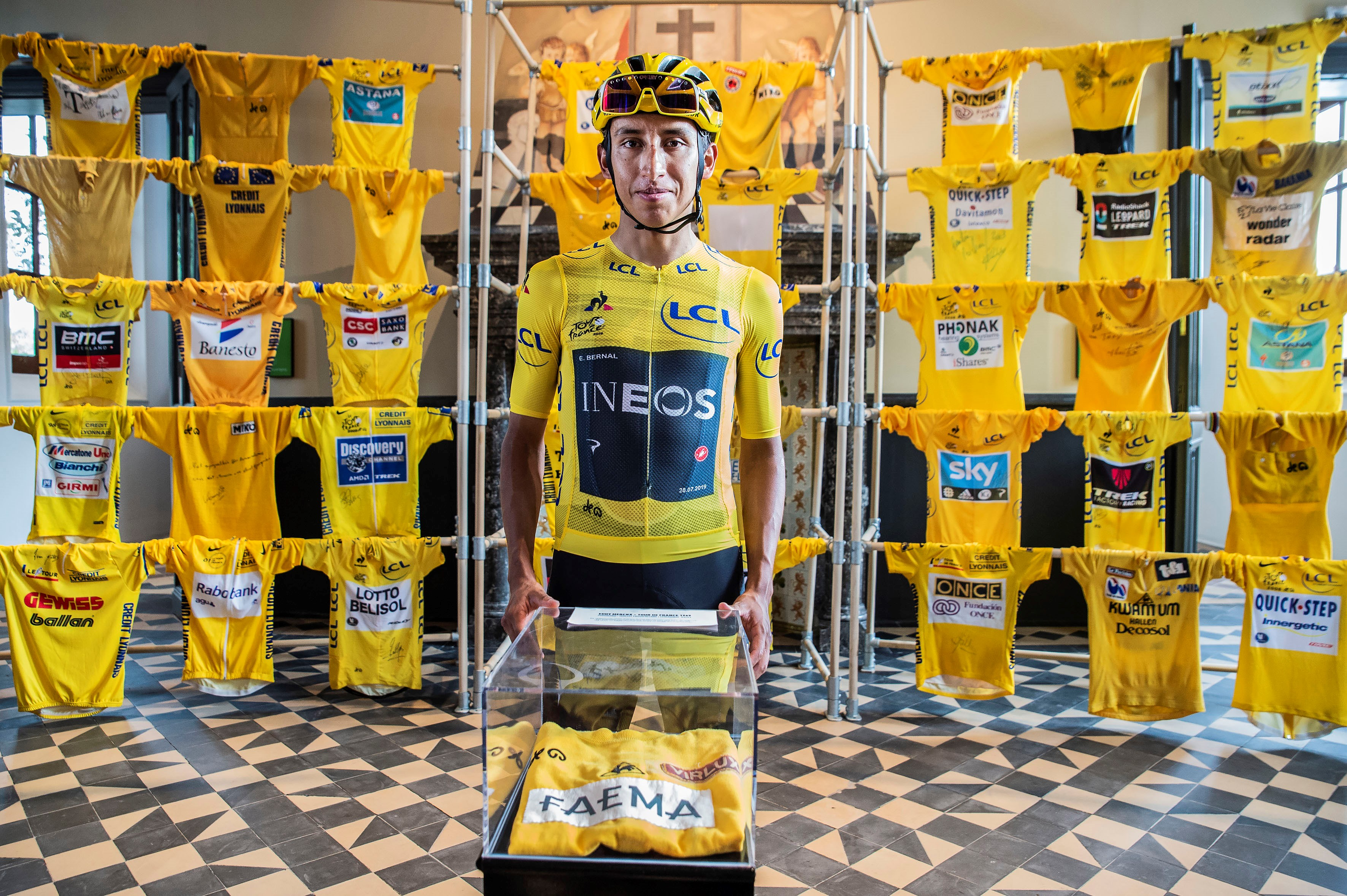
Egan Bernal at the KOERS cycling museum in the Belgian city of Roeselare, as he took part in the traditional post-Tour criteriums (Note: In the weeks after the Tour de France, criterium races are held, mostly in France, Belgium, and the Netherlands, in which the competitors of the Tour appear and are allowed to wear the jerseys of the classifications they won during the event.)

The inclement weather also caused the penultimate stage to be reduced in length beforehand, from 130 km (81 mi) to 59.5 km (37 mi), bypassing the first-category Cormet de Roselend and the second-category Côte de Longefoy, with the only climb being the hors catégorie-rated one to Val Thorens at the finish. A group of 29 riders established a two-and-a-half minute lead over the peloton, before being vastly reduced to six on the early slopes of the Val Thorens climb. With 12 km (7.5 mi) remaining, Nibali attacked from this group and soloed to victory, ten seconds ahead of chasers Landa and Alejandro Valverde. Close behind, Bernal and Thomas led the other general classification contenders Urán, Buchmann and Kruijswijk. Alaphilippe was dropped again, losing three minutes to Bernal and dropping from second overall to fifth.

The final stage in Paris was won by Ewan in a bunch sprint on the Champs-Élysées, his third win and the most of any rider in this edition of the race. Bernal won the race with no changes in the final stage. The 22-year-old Colombian became the youngest since François Faber in 1909 and first Latin American Tour winner. Thomas came second overall, 1' 11" down on Bernal, with Kruijswijk a further 20 seconds behind in third. Sagan won a record seventh points classification with a total of 316, 68 ahead of Ewan in second. Bardet won the mountains classification with 86 points, 8 ahead of Bernal in second. The young rider classification was won by Bernal, with thirteenth-placed overall Gaudu second. Bernal became the fifth rider to win both the general and young rider classification in the same year, following Laurent Fignon (1983), Jan Ullrich (1997), Alberto Contador (2007), and Andy Schleck (2010). The Movistar Team squad finished as the winners of the team classification, 47' 54" ahead of second-placed Trek–Segafredo. Of the 176 starters, 155 reached the finish of the last stage in Paris.

== Classification leadership and minor prizes ==
Four main individual classifications and a team competition were contested in the race. The most important was the general classification, calculated by adding each rider's finishing times on each stage. Time bonuses (time subtracted) were awarded at the end of every stage apart from the time trial stages. The first three riders received 10, 6, and 4 seconds, respectively. In an effort to animate racing in the general classification, time bonuses of 8, 5, and 2 seconds respectively were also awarded for the first three riders across a mountain summit, given out on eight climbs. These occurred on stages 3, 6, 8, 9, 12, 15, 18, and 19. These bonuses replaced the special time "bonus point" sprints that were a feature in the 2018 edition. For crashes within the final 3 km (1.9 mi) of a stage, not including time trials and summit finishes, any rider involved would have received the same time as the group he was in when the crash occurred. The rider with the lowest cumulative time was the winner of the general classification and was considered to be the overall winner of the Tour. The rider leading the classification wore a yellow jersey. In celebration of 100th anniversary of the yellow jersey, individual jersey designs were worn on each stage, apart from the first.

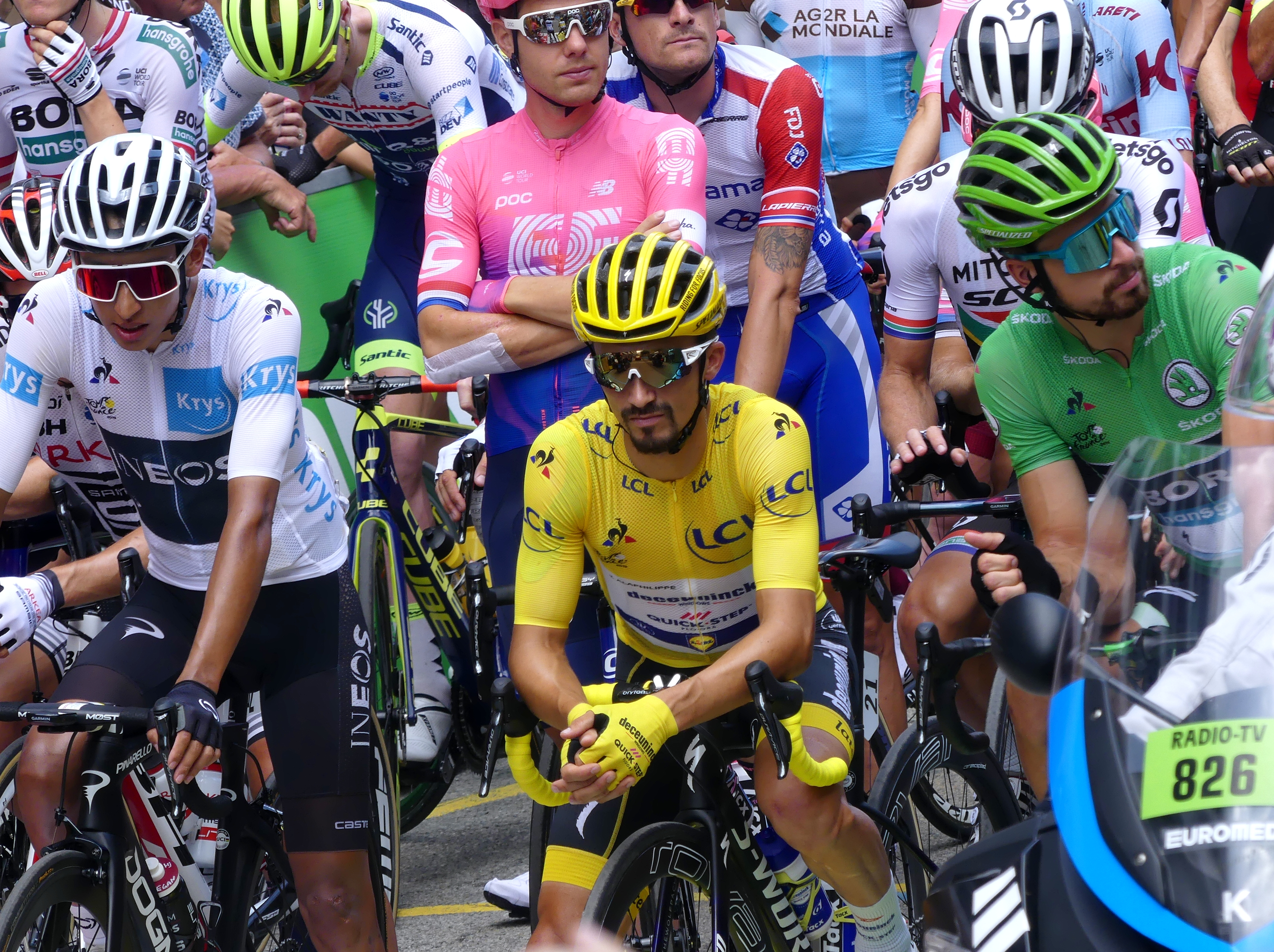
Leaders of the young rider, general and points classifications Egan Bernal, Julian Alaphilippe and Peter Sagan, respectively, lining up before stage 19. Sagan led from the end of stage 2 to win a record seventh green jersey.

Additionally, there was a points classification. Riders received points for finishing among the highest placed in a stage finish, or in intermediate sprints during the stage. The points available for each stage finish were determined by the stage's type, and sprints, with the first fifteen places in all receiving points. In flat stages, 50 points were given to the stage winner, down to 2 points for 15th place. In hilly stages, the winner gained 30 points, also down to 2 points. In mountain stages, individual time trials and intermediate sprints, 20 points were given to the winners, down to 1 point. The cyclist with the most points led the classification, and was identified with a green jersey.

There was also a mountains classification. Most stages of the race included one or more categorised climbs, in which points were awarded to the riders that reached the summit first. The climbs were categorised as fourth-, third-, second-, and first-category and hors catégorie, with the more difficult climbs rated lower. Mountains ranked hors catégorie gave 20 points to the first rider to cross the summit, down to 2 points to the 8th cyclist. For first-category climbs, 6 riders received points, with 10 for the first rider to reach the summit. Second-, third- and fourth-category climbs gave 5, 2 and 1 points to the first rider respectively. Double points were awarded at the top of the five planned hors catégorie climbs higher than 2,000 m (6,562 ft). The cyclist with the most points led the classification, wearing a white jersey with red polka dots.

The final individual classification was the young rider classification. This was calculated the same way as the general classification, but only riders under 26 years were eligible. This meant that in order to compete in the classification, a rider had to be born after 1 January 1994. Of the 176 starters, 48 were eligible. The leader wore a white jersey.

The classification for the teams was calculated by adding together the times of the first three cyclists of a team on each stage; the leading team was the one with the lowest cumulative time. The number of stage victories and placings per team would have determined the outcome of a tie. The riders on the team that led this classification were identified with yellow number bibs on the back of their jerseys and yellow helmets.

In addition, there was a combativity award given after each stage to the rider considered, by a jury, to have "made the greatest effort and who demonstrated the best qualities of sportsmanship". No combativity awards were given for the time trials and the final stage. The winner wore a red number bib for the following stage. At the conclusion of the Tour, Julian Alaphilippe won the overall super-combativity award, again awarded by a jury.

A total of €2,291,700 was awarded in cash prizes in the race. The overall winner of the general classification received €500,000, with the second and third placed riders getting €200,000 and €100,000 respectively. All finishers in the top 160 were awarded money. The holders of the classifications benefited on each stage they led; the final winners of the points and mountains were given €25,000, while the best young rider and most combative rider got €20,000. The team classification winners earned €50,000. €11,000 was given to the winners of each stage of the race, with smaller amounts given to places 2–20. There were also two special awards each with a prize of €5000. The Souvenir Jacques Goddet, given to the first rider to pass Goddet's memorial at the summit of the Col du Tourmalet in stage 14, and the Souvenir Henri Desgrange, given to the first rider to pass the summit of the highest climb in the Tour, the Col de l'Iseran on stage 19. Thibaut Pinot won the Jacques Goddet and Egan Bernal claimed the Henri Desgrange.

Classification leadership by stage
Stage	Winner	General classification	Points classification	Mountains classification	Young rider classification	Team classification	Combativity award
1	Mike Teunissen	Mike Teunissen	Mike Teunissen	Greg Van Avermaet	Caleb Ewan	Team Jumbo–Visma	Stéphane Rossetto
2	Team Jumbo–Visma	Mike Teunissen	Mike Teunissen	Greg Van Avermaet	Wout van Aert	Team Jumbo–Visma	no award
3	Julian Alaphilippe	Julian Alaphilippe	Peter Sagan	Tim Wellens	Wout van Aert	Team Jumbo–Visma	Tim Wellens
4	Elia Viviani	Julian Alaphilippe	Peter Sagan	Tim Wellens	Wout van Aert	Team Jumbo–Visma	Michael Schär
5	Peter Sagan	Julian Alaphilippe	Peter Sagan	Tim Wellens	Wout van Aert	Team Jumbo–Visma	Toms Skujiņš
6	Dylan Teuns	Giulio Ciccone	Peter Sagan	Tim Wellens	Giulio Ciccone	Trek–Segafredo	Tim Wellens
7	Dylan Groenewegen	Giulio Ciccone	Peter Sagan	Tim Wellens	Giulio Ciccone	Trek–Segafredo	Yoann Offredo
8	Thomas De Gendt	Julian Alaphilippe	Peter Sagan	Tim Wellens	Giulio Ciccone	Trek–Segafredo	Thomas De Gendt
9	Daryl Impey	Julian Alaphilippe	Peter Sagan	Tim Wellens	Giulio Ciccone	Trek–Segafredo	Tiesj Benoot
10	Wout van Aert	Julian Alaphilippe	Peter Sagan	Tim Wellens	Egan Bernal	Movistar Team	Natnael Berhane
11	Caleb Ewan	Julian Alaphilippe	Peter Sagan	Tim Wellens	Egan Bernal	Movistar Team	Aimé De Gendt
12	Simon Yates	Julian Alaphilippe	Peter Sagan	Tim Wellens	Egan Bernal	Trek–Segafredo	Matteo Trentin
13	Julian Alaphilippe	Julian Alaphilippe	Peter Sagan	Tim Wellens	Enric Mas	Trek–Segafredo	no award
14	Thibaut Pinot	Julian Alaphilippe	Peter Sagan	Tim Wellens	Egan Bernal	Movistar Team	Élie Gesbert
15	Simon Yates	Julian Alaphilippe	Peter Sagan	Tim Wellens	Egan Bernal	Movistar Team	Mikel Landa
16	Caleb Ewan	Julian Alaphilippe	Peter Sagan	Tim Wellens	Egan Bernal	Movistar Team	Alexis Gougeard
17	Matteo Trentin	Julian Alaphilippe	Peter Sagan	Tim Wellens	Egan Bernal	Trek–Segafredo	Matteo Trentin
18	Nairo Quintana	Julian Alaphilippe	Peter Sagan	Romain Bardet	Egan Bernal	Movistar Team	Greg Van Avermaet
19	no winner	Egan Bernal	Peter Sagan	Romain Bardet	Egan Bernal	Movistar Team	no award
20	Vincenzo Nibali	Egan Bernal	Peter Sagan	Romain Bardet	Egan Bernal	Movistar Team	Vincenzo Nibali
21	Caleb Ewan	Egan Bernal	Peter Sagan	Romain Bardet	Egan Bernal	Movistar Team	no award
Final		Egan Bernal	Peter Sagan	Romain Bardet	Egan Bernal	Movistar Team	Julian Alaphilippe

- On stages 2 and 3, Peter Sagan, who was second in the points classification, wore the green jersey, because first placed Mike Teunissen wore the yellow jersey as leader of the general classification.
- On stages 7 and 8, Egan Bernal, who was second in the young rider classification, wore the white jersey, because first placed Giulio Ciccone wore the yellow jersey as leader of the general classification.
- On stages 20 and 21, David Gaudu, who was second in the young rider classification, wore the white jersey, because first placed Egan Bernal wore the yellow jersey as leader of the general classification.

== Final standings ==
Legend
A yellow jersey.	Denotes the winner of the general classification	A white jersey with red polka dots.	Denotes the winner of the mountains classification
A green jersey.	Denotes the winner of the points classification	A white jersey.	Denotes the winner of the young rider classification
A white jersey with a yellow number bib.	Denotes the winner of the team classification	A white jersey with a red number bib.	Denotes the winner of the combativity award

=== General classification ===
Final general classification (1–10)
Rank	Rider	Team	Time
1	Egan Bernal (COL)	Team INEOS	82h 57' 00"
2	Geraint Thomas (GBR)	Team INEOS	+ 1' 11"
3	Steven Kruijswijk (NED)	Team Jumbo–Visma	+ 1' 31"
4	Emanuel Buchmann (GER)	Bora–Hansgrohe	+ 1' 56"
5	Julian Alaphilippe (FRA)	Deceuninck–Quick-Step	+ 4' 05"
6	Mikel Landa (ESP)	Movistar Team	+ 4' 23"
7	Rigoberto Urán (COL)	EF Education First	+ 5' 15"
8	Nairo Quintana (COL)	Movistar Team	+ 5' 30"
9	Alejandro Valverde (ESP)	Movistar Team	+ 6' 12"
10	Warren Barguil (FRA)	Arkéa–Samsic	+ 7' 32"

Final general classification (11–155)
Rank	Rider	Team	Time
11	Richie Porte (AUS)	Trek–Segafredo	+ 12' 42"
12	Guillaume Martin (FRA)	Wanty–Gobert	+ 22' 08"
13	David Gaudu (FRA)	Groupama–FDJ	+ 23' 58"
14	Fabio Aru (ITA)	UAE Team Emirates	+ 27' 36"
15	Romain Bardet (FRA)	AG2R La Mondiale	+ 30' 23"
16	Roman Kreuziger (CZE)	Team Dimension Data	+ 36' 09"
17	Sébastien Reichenbach (SUI)	Groupama–FDJ	+ 44' 29"
18	Dan Martin (IRL)	UAE Team Emirates	+ 45' 21"
19	Alexey Lutsenko (KAZ)	Astana	+ 48' 52"
20	Jesús Herrada (ESP)	Cofidis	+ 51' 57"
21	Xandro Meurisse (BEL)	Wanty–Gobert	+ 56' 47"
22	Enric Mas (ESP)	Deceuninck–Quick-Step	+ 58' 20"
23	Laurens De Plus (BEL)	Team Jumbo–Visma	+ 1h 02' 44"
24	George Bennett (NZL)	Team Jumbo–Visma	+ 1h 04' 40"
25	Gregor Mühlberger (AUT)	Bora–Hansgrohe	+ 1h 04' 40"
26	Wout Poels (NED)	Team INEOS	+ 1h 12' 25"
27	Tanel Kangert (EST)	EF Education First	+ 1h 12' 36"
28	Bauke Mollema (NED)	Trek–Segafredo	+ 1h 14' 58"
29	Adam Yates (GBR)	Mitchelton–Scott	+ 1h 16' 50"
30	Julien Bernard (FRA)	Trek–Segafredo	+ 1h 20' 07"
31	Giulio Ciccone (ITA)	Trek–Segafredo	+ 1h 20' 49"
32	Michael Woods (CAN)	EF Education First	+ 1h 21' 00"
33	Rudy Molard (FRA)	Groupama–FDJ	+ 1h 21' 17"
34	Mikaël Cherel (FRA)	AG2R La Mondiale	+ 1h 22' 32"
35	Patrick Konrad (AUT)	Bora–Hansgrohe	+ 1h 24' 35"
36	Greg Van Avermaet (BEL)	CCC Team	+ 1h 27' 56"
37	Marc Soler (ESP)	Movistar Team	+ 1h 35' 45"
38	Jack Haig (AUS)	Mitchelton–Scott	+ 1h 36' 59"
39	Vincenzo Nibali (ITA)	Bahrain–Merida	+ 1h 37' 02"
40	Lennard Kämna (GER)	Team Sunweb	+ 1h 39' 36"
41	Alexis Vuillermoz (FRA)	AG2R La Mondiale	+ 1h 40' 07"
42	Gorka Izagirre (ESP)	Astana	+ 1h 40' 17"
43	Jasper Stuyven (BEL)	Trek–Segafredo	+ 1h 43' 42"
44	Dylan Teuns (BEL)	Bahrain–Merida	+ 1h 44' 17"
45	Nicolas Roche (IRL)	Team Sunweb	+ 1h 47' 20"
46	Dylan van Baarle (NED)	Team INEOS	+ 1h 51' 38"
47	Sergio Henao (COL)	UAE Team Emirates	+ 1h 52' 37"
48	Mathias Frank (SUI)	AG2R La Mondiale	+ 1h 53' 51"
49	Simon Yates (GBR)	Mitchelton–Scott	+ 1h 53' 54"
50	Jonathan Castroviejo (ESP)	Team INEOS	+ 1h 54' 22"
51	Ilnur Zakarin (RUS)	Team Katusha–Alpecin	+ 1h 55' 57"
52	Matteo Trentin (ITA)	Mitchelton–Scott	+ 1h 57' 38"
53	Rui Costa (POR)	UAE Team Emirates	+ 1h 59' 02"
54	Pello Bilbao (ESP)	Astana	+ 1h 59' 10"
55	Andrey Amador (CRC)	Movistar Team	+ 1h 59' 55"
56	Tony Gallopin (FRA)	AG2R La Mondiale	+ 2h 03' 00"
57	Pierre-Luc Périchon (FRA)	Cofidis	+ 2h 05' 35"
58	Damiano Caruso (ITA)	Bahrain–Merida	+ 2h 07' 15"
59	Tiesj Benoot (BEL)	Lotto–Soudal	+ 2h 07' 28"
60	Thomas De Gendt (BEL)	Lotto–Soudal	+ 2h 10' 33"
61	Simon Clarke (AUS)	EF Education First	+ 2h 11' 43"
62	Ben King (USA)	Team Dimension Data	+ 2h 12' 00"
63	Simon Geschke (GER)	CCC Team	+ 2h 13' 25"
64	Nils Politt (GER)	Team Katusha–Alpecin	+ 2h 14' 28"
65	Fabio Felline (ITA)	Trek–Segafredo	+ 2h 15' 03"
66	Rein Taaramäe (EST)	Total Direct Énergie	+ 2h 15' 42"
67	Michael Matthews (AUS)	Team Sunweb	+ 2h 16' 34"
68	Oliver Naesen (BEL)	AG2R La Mondiale	+ 2h 16' 43"
69	Alberto Bettiol (ITA)	EF Education First	+ 2h 19' 06"
70	Michael Schär (SUI)	CCC Team	+ 2h 19' 45"
71	Omar Fraile (ESP)	Astana	+ 2h 19' 52"
72	Daryl Impey (RSA)	Mitchelton–Scott	+ 2h 24' 58"
73	Joey Rosskopf (USA)	CCC Team	+ 2h 26' 36"
74	Maxime Bouet (FRA)	Arkéa–Samsic	+ 2h 28' 04"
75	Michael Valgren (DEN)	Team Dimension Data	+ 2h 28' 07"
76	Edvald Boasson Hagen (NOR)	Team Dimension Data	+ 2h 28' 19"
77	Serge Pauwels (BEL)	CCC Team	+ 2h 32' 14"
78	Élie Gesbert (FRA)	Arkéa–Samsic	+ 2h 33' 02"
79	Nelson Oliveira (POR)	Movistar Team	+ 2h 35' 51"
80	Romain Sicard (FRA)	Total Direct Énergie	+ 2h 38' 26"
81	Toms Skujiņš (LAT)	Trek–Segafredo	+ 2h 39' 50"
82	Peter Sagan (SVK)	Bora–Hansgrohe	+ 2h 44' 24"
83	Michał Kwiatkowski (POL)	Team INEOS	+ 2h 46' 14"
84	Gianni Moscon (ITA)	Team INEOS	+ 2h 47' 23"
85	Sonny Colbrelli (ITA)	Bahrain–Merida	+ 2h 48' 27"
86	Natnael Berhane (ERI)	Cofidis	+ 2h 49' 25"
87	Anthony Perez (FRA)	Cofidis	+ 2h 51' 36"
88	Andrea Pasqualon (ITA)	Wanty–Gobert	+ 2h 53' 25"
89	Daniel Oss (ITA)	Bora–Hansgrohe	+ 2h 54' 56"
90	Anthony Delaplace (FRA)	Arkéa–Samsic	+ 2h 55' 03"
91	Hugo Houle (CAN)	Astana	+ 2h 56' 11"
92	Amaël Moinard (FRA)	Arkéa–Samsic	+ 2h 59' 17"
93	Jan Tratnik (SLO)	Bahrain–Merida	+ 3h 00' 37"
94	Tim Wellens (BEL)	Lotto–Soudal	+ 3h 01' 43"
95	Paul Ourselin (FRA)	Total Direct Énergie	+ 3h 01' 47"
96	Stefan Küng (SUI)	Groupama–FDJ	+ 3h 02' 38"
97	Dries Devenyns (BEL)	Deceuninck–Quick-Step	+ 3h 02' 42"
98	Jens Keukeleire (BEL)	Lotto–Soudal	+ 3h 03' 49"
99	Imanol Erviti (ESP)	Movistar Team	+ 3h 04' 34"
100	Stéphane Rossetto (FRA)	Cofidis	+ 3h 05' 15"
101	Mike Teunissen (NED)	Team Jumbo–Visma	+ 3h 06' 54"
102	Anthony Roux (FRA)	Groupama–FDJ	+ 3h 08' 49"
103	Kévin Ledanois (FRA)	Total Direct Énergie	+ 3h 12' 17"
104	Magnus Cort (DEN)	Astana	+ 3h 12' 22"
105	Carlos Verona (ESP)	Movistar Team	+ 3h 13' 05"
106	Lilian Calmejane (FRA)	Total Direct Énergie	+ 3h 13' 36"
107	Vegard Stake Laengen (NOR)	UAE Team Emirates	+ 3h 15' 25"
108	Julien Simon (FRA)	Cofidis	+ 3h 17' 08"
109	Luke Durbridge (AUS)	Mitchelton–Scott	+ 3h 18' 36"
110	Sven Erik Bystrøm (NOR)	UAE Team Emirates	+ 3h 19' 40"
111	Odd Christian Eiking (NOR)	Wanty–Gobert	+ 3h 19' 58"
112	Christopher Juul-Jensen (DEN)	Mitchelton–Scott	+ 3h 22' 22"
113	Benoît Cosnefroy (FRA)	AG2R La Mondiale	+ 3h 25' 57"
114	Iván García (ESP)	Bahrain–Merida	+ 3h 26' 03"
115	Alexis Gougeard (FRA)	AG2R La Mondiale	+ 3h 27' 10"
116	Nikias Arndt (GER)	Team Sunweb	+ 3h 27' 43"
117	Mads Würtz Schmidt (DEN)	Team Katusha–Alpecin	+ 3h 29' 22"
118	Jasper de Buyst (BEL)	Lotto–Soudal	+ 3h 31' 36"
119	Matej Mohorič (SLO)	Bahrain–Merida	+ 3h 33' 43"
120	Frederik Backaert (BEL)	Wanty–Gobert	+ 3h 34' 00"
121	Fabien Grellier (FRA)	Total Direct Énergie	+ 3h 35' 12"
122	Kasper Asgreen (DEN)	Deceuninck–Quick-Step	+ 3h 38' 18"
123	Florian Vachon (FRA)	Arkéa–Samsic	+ 3h 43' 22"
124	Reinardt Janse van Rensburg (RSA)	Team Dimension Data	+ 3h 44' 10"
125	Koen de Kort (NED)	Trek–Segafredo	+ 3h 44' 48"
126	Mathieu Ladagnous (FRA)	Groupama–FDJ	+ 3h 45' 11"
127	Łukasz Wiśniowski (POL)	CCC Team	+ 3h 46' 34"
128	José Gonçalves (POR)	Team Katusha–Alpecin	+ 3h 47' 15"
129	Steve Cummings (GBR)	Team Dimension Data	+ 3h 49' 45"
130	Elia Viviani (ITA)	Deceuninck–Quick-Step	+ 3h 52' 37"
131	Anthony Turgis (FRA)	Total Direct Énergie	+ 3h 53' 11"
132	Caleb Ewan (AUS)	Lotto–Soudal	+ 3h 54' 34"
133	Yves Lampaert (BEL)	Deceuninck–Quick-Step	+ 3h 54' 37"
134	Chad Haga (USA)	Team Sunweb	+ 3h 54' 51"
135	Tom Scully (NZL)	EF Education First	+ 3h 56' 52"
136	Aimé De Gendt (BEL)	Wanty–Gobert	+ 3h 57' 05"
137	Niccolò Bonifazio (ITA)	Total Direct Énergie	+ 3h 59' 44"
138	Kevin Van Melsen (BEL)	Wanty–Gobert	+ 4h 00' 20"
139	Alexander Kristoff (NOR)	UAE Team Emirates	+ 4h 01' 05"
140	Amund Grøndahl Jansen (NOR)	Team Jumbo–Visma	+ 4h 02' 02"
141	Marcus Burghardt (GER)	Bora–Hansgrohe	+ 4h 02' 18"
142	Maxime Monfort (BEL)	Lotto–Soudal	+ 4h 03' 56"
143	William Bonnet (FRA)	Groupama–FDJ	+ 4h 05' 32"
144	André Greipel (GER)	Arkéa–Samsic	+ 4h 07' 00"
145	Dylan Groenewegen (NED)	Team Jumbo–Visma	+ 4h 07' 10"
146	Michael Hepburn (AUS)	Mitchelton–Scott	+ 4h 07' 32"
147	Lars Bak (DEN)	Team Dimension Data	+ 4h 07' 48"
148	Marco Haller (AUT)	Team Katusha–Alpecin	+ 4h 08' 17"
149	Maximiliano Richeze (ARG)	Deceuninck–Quick-Step	+ 4h 10' 05"
150	Roger Kluge (GER)	Lotto–Soudal	+ 4h 13' 43"
151	Alex Dowsett (GBR)	Team Katusha–Alpecin	+ 4h 14' 39"
152	Michael Mørkøv (DEN)	Deceuninck–Quick-Step	+ 4h 19' 33"
153	Jens Debusschere (BEL)	Team Katusha–Alpecin	+ 4h 29' 07"
154	Yoann Offredo (FRA)	Wanty–Gobert	+ 4h 31' 43"
155	Sebastian Langeveld (NED)	EF Education First	+ 4h 34' 23"

=== Points classification ===
Final points classification (1–10)
Rank	Rider	Team	Points
1	Peter Sagan (SVK)	Bora–Hansgrohe	316
2	Caleb Ewan (AUS)	Lotto–Soudal	248
3	Elia Viviani (ITA)	Deceuninck–Quick-Step	224
4	Sonny Colbrelli (ITA)	Bahrain–Merida	209
5	Michael Matthews (AUS)	Team Sunweb	201
6	Matteo Trentin (ITA)	Mitchelton–Scott	192
7	Jasper Stuyven (BEL)	Trek–Segafredo	167
8	Greg Van Avermaet (BEL)	CCC Team	149
9	Dylan Groenewegen (NED)	Team Jumbo–Visma	146
10	Julian Alaphilippe (FRA)	Deceuninck–Quick-Step	119

=== Mountains classification ===
Final mountains classification (1–10)
Rank	Rider	Team	Points
1	Romain Bardet (FRA)	AG2R La Mondiale	86
2	Egan Bernal (COL)	Team INEOS	78
3	Tim Wellens (BEL)	Lotto–Soudal	75
4	Damiano Caruso (ITA)	Bahrain–Merida	67
5	Vincenzo Nibali (ITA)	Bahrain–Merida	59
6	Simon Yates (GBR)	Mitchelton–Scott	59
7	Nairo Quintana (COL)	Movistar Team	58
8	Alexey Lutsenko (KAZ)	Astana	45
9	Steven Kruijswijk (NED)	Team Jumbo–Visma	44
10	Mikel Landa (ESP)	Movistar Team	42

=== Young rider classification ===
Final young rider classification (1–10)
Rank	Rider	Team	Time
1	Egan Bernal (COL)	Team INEOS	82h 57' 00"
2	David Gaudu (FRA)	Groupama–FDJ	+ 23' 58"
3	Enric Mas (ESP)	Deceuninck–Quick-Step	+ 58' 20"
4	Laurens De Plus (BEL)	Team Jumbo–Visma	+ 1h 02' 44"
5	Gregor Mühlberger (AUT)	Bora–Hansgrohe	+ 1h 04' 40"
6	Giulio Ciccone (ITA)	Trek–Segafredo	+ 1h 20' 49"
7	Lennard Kämna (GER)	Team Sunweb	+ 1h 39' 36"
8	Tiesj Benoot (BEL)	Lotto–Soudal	+ 2h 07' 33"
9	Nils Politt (GER)	Team Katusha–Alpecin	+ 2h 14' 28"
10	Élie Gesbert (FRA)	Arkéa–Samsic	+ 2h 33' 02"

=== Team classification ===
Final team classification (1–10)
Rank	Team	Time
1	(Spain) Movistar Team	248h 58' 15"
2	(United States) Trek–Segafredo	+ 47' 54"
3	(United Kingdom) Team INEOS	+ 57' 52"
4	(United States) EF Education First	+ 1h 25' 57"
5	(Germany) Bora–Hansgrohe	+ 1h 29' 30"
6	(France) Groupama–FDJ	+ 1h 42' 29"
7	(Netherlands) Team Jumbo–Visma	+ 1h 52' 55"
8	(France) AG2R La Mondiale	+ 2h 08' 56"
9	(United Arab Emirates) UAE Team Emirates	+ 2h 10' 32"
10	(Kazakhstan) Astana	+ 2h 27' 37"

== UCI rankings ==
For the UCI World Ranking system, riders from both the WorldTeams and Professional Continental teams competed individually, for their teams, and for their nations, winning points that contributed towards separate rankings, which included all UCI road races. There was also an individual ranking introduced for the 2019 season that only took into account UCI stage races, the Stage Race World Ranking. Points were awarded to the top 60 in the general classification, each yellow jersey given at the end of a stage, the top 5 finishers in each stage and for the top 3 in the final points and mountains classifications.

The points accrued by Egan Bernal moved him from 23rd to 6th in the individual World Ranking and from ninth to second in the Stage Race World Ranking. Julian Alaphilippe retained his position at the top of individual World Ranking, with Deceuninck–Quick-Step and Belgium also holding the lead of the team and nation ranking respectively.

UCI World Ranking individual ranking on 28 July 2019 (1–10)
Rank	Prev.	Name	Team	Points
1	1	Julian Alaphilippe (FRA)	Deceuninck–Quick-Step	4337.62
2	4	Alejandro Valverde (ESP)	Movistar Team	3109.00
3	3	Jakob Fuglsang (DEN)	Astana	2991.00
4	5	Thibaut Pinot (FRA)	Groupama–FDJ	2976.00
5	2	Primož Roglič (SLO)	Team Jumbo–Visma	2859.61
6	23	Egan Bernal (COL)	Team INEOS	2726.75
7	6	Greg Van Avermaet (BEL)	CCC Team	2412.33
8	8	Michael Matthews (AUS)	Team Sunweb	2409.55
9	12	Simon Yates (GBR)	Mitchelton–Scott	2320.00
10	9	Pascal Ackermann (GER)	Bora–Hansgrohe	2305.00

UCI Stage Race World Ranking individual ranking on 28 July 2019 (1–10)
Rank	Prev.	Name	Team	Points
1	1	Primož Roglič (SLO)	Team Jumbo–Visma	2704.61
2	9	Egan Bernal (COL)	Team INEOS	2606.75
3	2	Simon Yates (GBR)	Mitchelton–Scott	2320.00
4	12	Julian Alaphilippe (FRA)	Deceuninck–Quick-Step	2132.62
5	5	Thibaut Pinot (FRA)	Groupama–FDJ	1903.00
6	4	Miguel Ángel López (COL)	Astana	1825.00
7	16	Emanuel Buchmann (GER)	Bora–Hansgrohe	1823.00
8	7	Alejandro Valverde (ESP)	Movistar Team	1718.00
9	11	Steven Kruijswijk (NED)	Team Jumbo–Visma	1696.00
10	6	Richard Carapaz (ECU)	Movistar Team	1573.00

== See also ==
- 2019 in sports
- 2019 La Course by Le Tour de France – a women's one-day race held during the Tour

== Bibliography ==
- Race regulations (PDF). Paris: Amaury Sport Organisation. 2019.
- UCI cycling regulations (PDF). Part 2, road races. Aigle, Switzerland: Union Cycliste Internationale. 1 July 2019. Archived from the original (PDF) on 5 July 2019.
- van den Akker, Pieter (2018). Tour de France Rules and Statistics: 1903–2018. Self-published. ISBN 978-1-79398-080-9.
