= 2015 UCI Europe Tour =

Road bicycle race series

- Eleventh edition of the UCI Europe Tour

Details
- Dates: 29 January 2015 – 25 October 2015
- Location: Europe
- Races: About 300+

Champions
- Individual champion: Nacer Bouhanni (FRA) (Cofidis)
- Teams' champion: Topsport Vlaanderen–Baloise
- Nations' champion: Belgium

The 2015 UCI Europe Tour was the eleventh season of the UCI Europe Tour. The 2015 season began on 29 January 2015 with the Trofeo Santanyí-Ses Salines-Campos and ended on 25 October 2015 with the Tour of Aegean.

The points leader, based on the cumulative results of previous races, wears the UCI Europe Tour cycling jersey. Tom Van Asbroeck of Belgium is the defending champion of the 2014 UCI Europe Tour.

Throughout the season, points are awarded to the top finishers of stages within stage races and the final general classification standings of each of the stages races and one-day events. The quality and complexity of a race also determines how many points are awarded to the top finishers, the higher the UCI rating of a race, the more points are awarded.

The UCI ratings from highest to lowest are as follows:

- Multi-day events: 2.HC, 2.1 and 2.2
- One-day events: 1.HC, 1.1 and 1.2

== Events ==
=== January ===
Date	Race name	Location	UCI Rating	Winner	Team	Ref
29 January	Trofeo Santanyí	Spain	1.1	Matteo Pelucchi (ITA)	IAM Cycling	
30 January	Trofeo Andratx	Spain	1.1	Steve Cummings (GBR)	MTN–Qhubeka	
31 January	Trofeo Serra de Tramuntana	Spain	1.1	Alejandro Valverde (ESP)	Movistar Team	

=== February ===
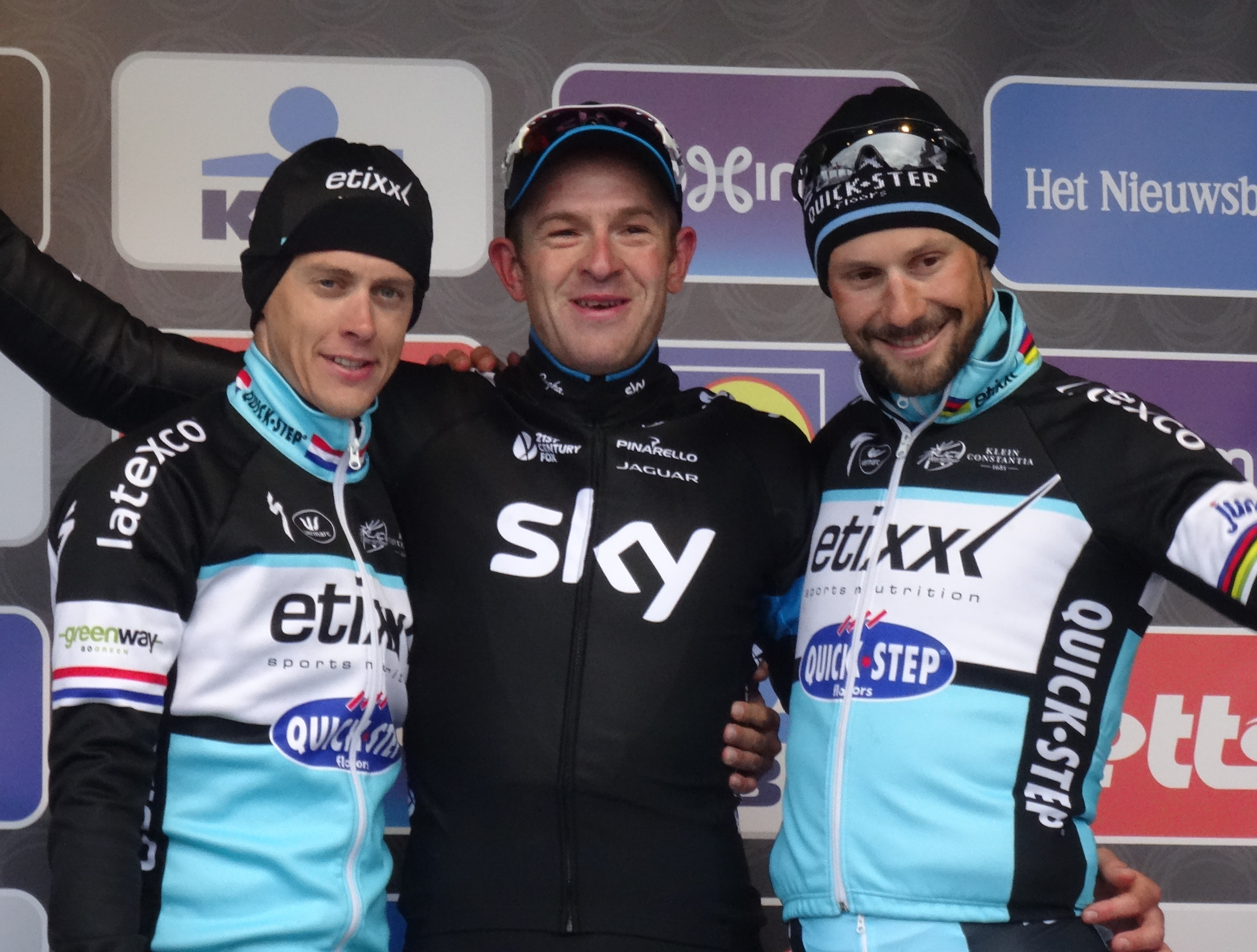
Omloop Het Nieuwsblad podium: Niki Terpstra (2), Ian Stannard (1) & Tom Boonen (3).

Date	Race name	Location	UCI Rating	Winner	Team	Ref
1 February	Trofeo Playa de Palma	Spain	1.1	Matteo Pelucchi (ITA)	IAM Cycling	
1 February	GP Cycliste la Marseillaise	France	1.1	Pim Ligthart (NED)	Lotto–Soudal	
4–8 February	Étoile de Bessèges	France	2.1	Bob Jungels (LUX)	Trek Factory Racing	
8 February	GP Costa degli Etruschi	Italy	1.1	Manuel Belletti (ITA)	Southeast Pro Cycling	
14 February	Vuelta a Murcia	Spain	1.1	Rein Taaramäe (EST)	Astana	
15 February	Clásica de Almería	Spain	1.1	Mark Cavendish (GBR)	Etixx–Quick-Step	
15 February	GP Laguna	Croatia	1.2	Michael Gogl (AUT)	Team Felbermayr–Simplon Wels	
18–22 February	Vuelta a Andalucía	Spain	2.1	Chris Froome (GBR)	Team Sky	
18–22 February	Volta ao Algarve	Portugal	2.1	Geraint Thomas (GBR)	Team Sky	
19 February	Trofeo Laigueglia	Italy	1.HC	Davide Cimolai (ITA)	Lampre–Merida	
21–22 February	Tour du Haut Var	France	2.1	Ben Gastauer (LUX)	AG2R La Mondiale	
28 February	Omloop Het Nieuwsblad	Belgium	1.HC	Ian Stannard (GBR)	Team Sky	
28 February	Classic Sud-Ardèche	France	1.1	Eduardo Sepúlveda (ARG)	Bretagne–Séché Environnement	
28 February	Ster van Zwolle	Netherlands	1.2	Elmar Reinders (NED)	Cyclingteam Jo Piels	

=== March ===
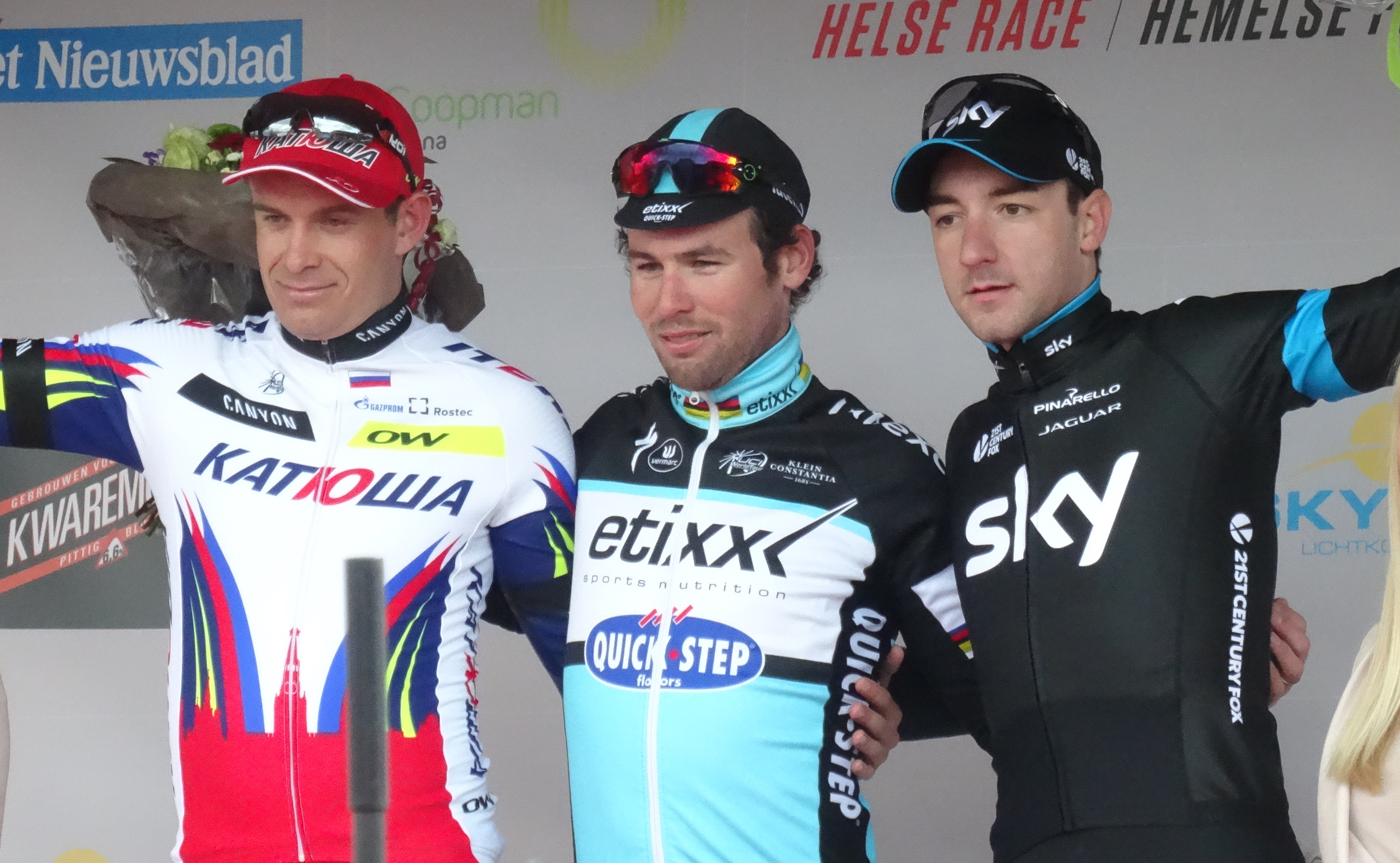
Kuurne–Brussels–Kuurne podium: Alexander Kristoff (2nd), Mark Cavendish (1st) and Elia Viviani (3rd).

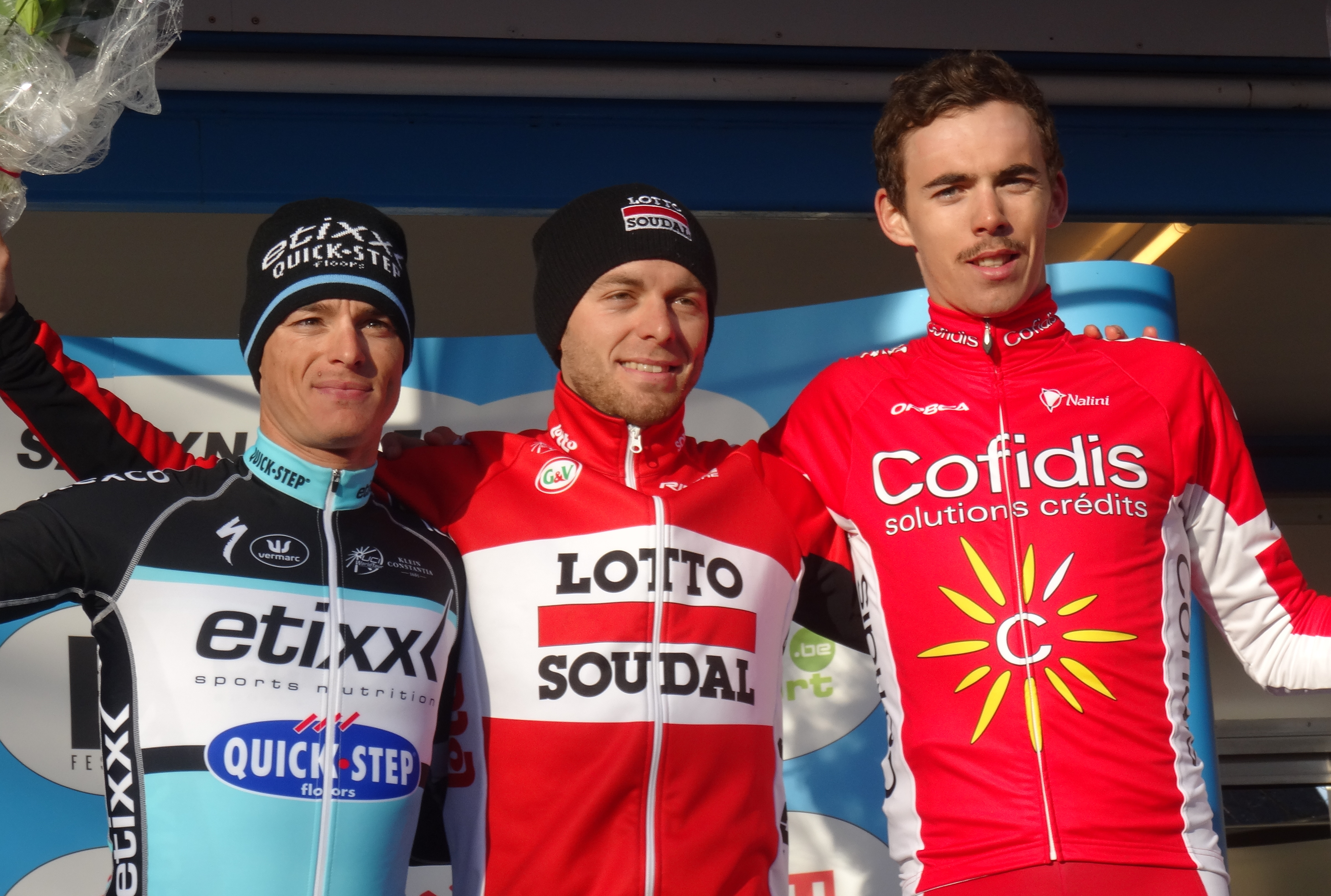
Le Samyn podium: Gianni Meersman (2nd), Kris Boeckmans (1st) and Christophe Laporte (3rd).

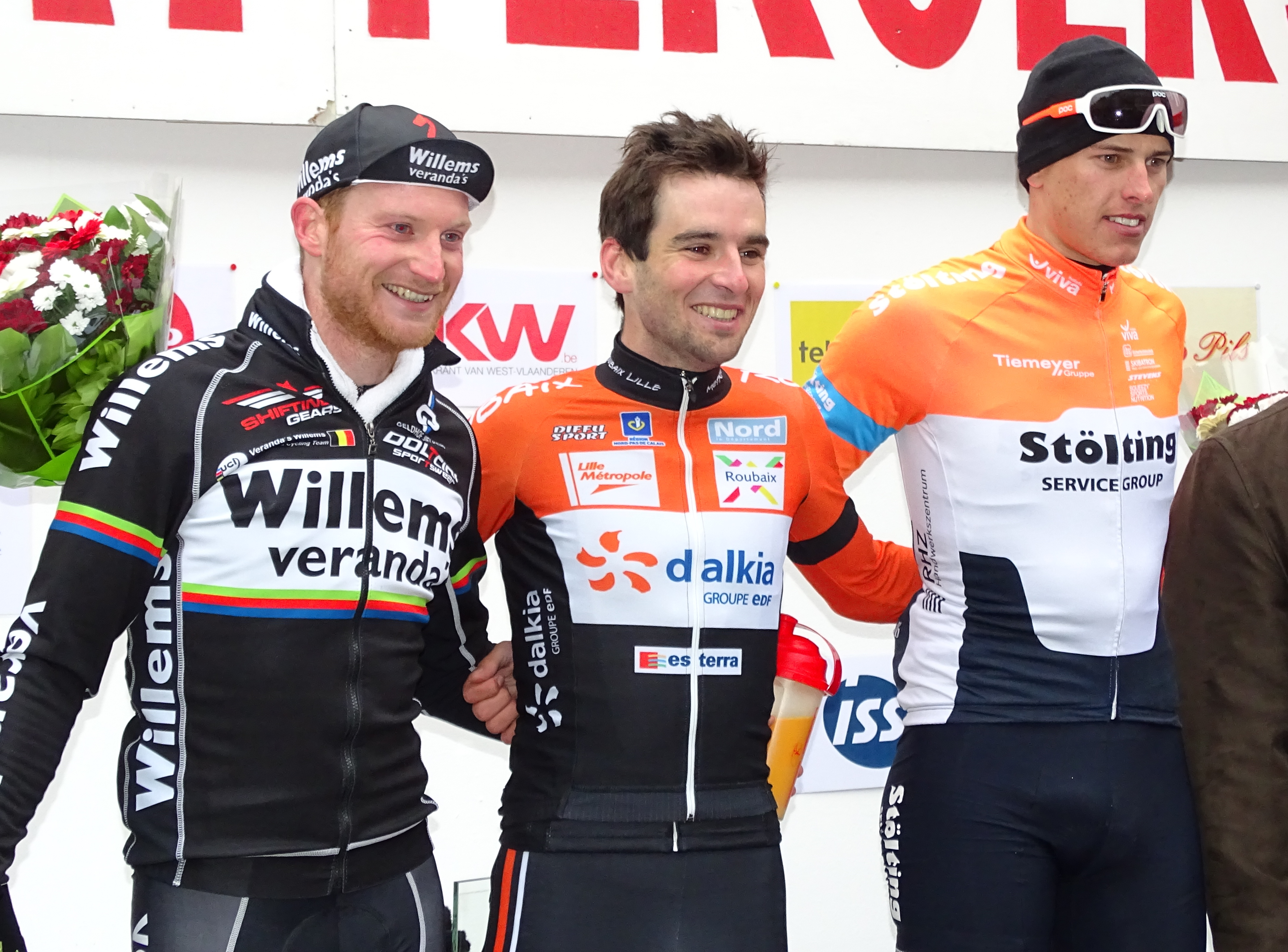
Kattekoers podium: Joeri Calleeuw (2nd), Baptiste Planckaert (1st) and Nils Politt (3rd).

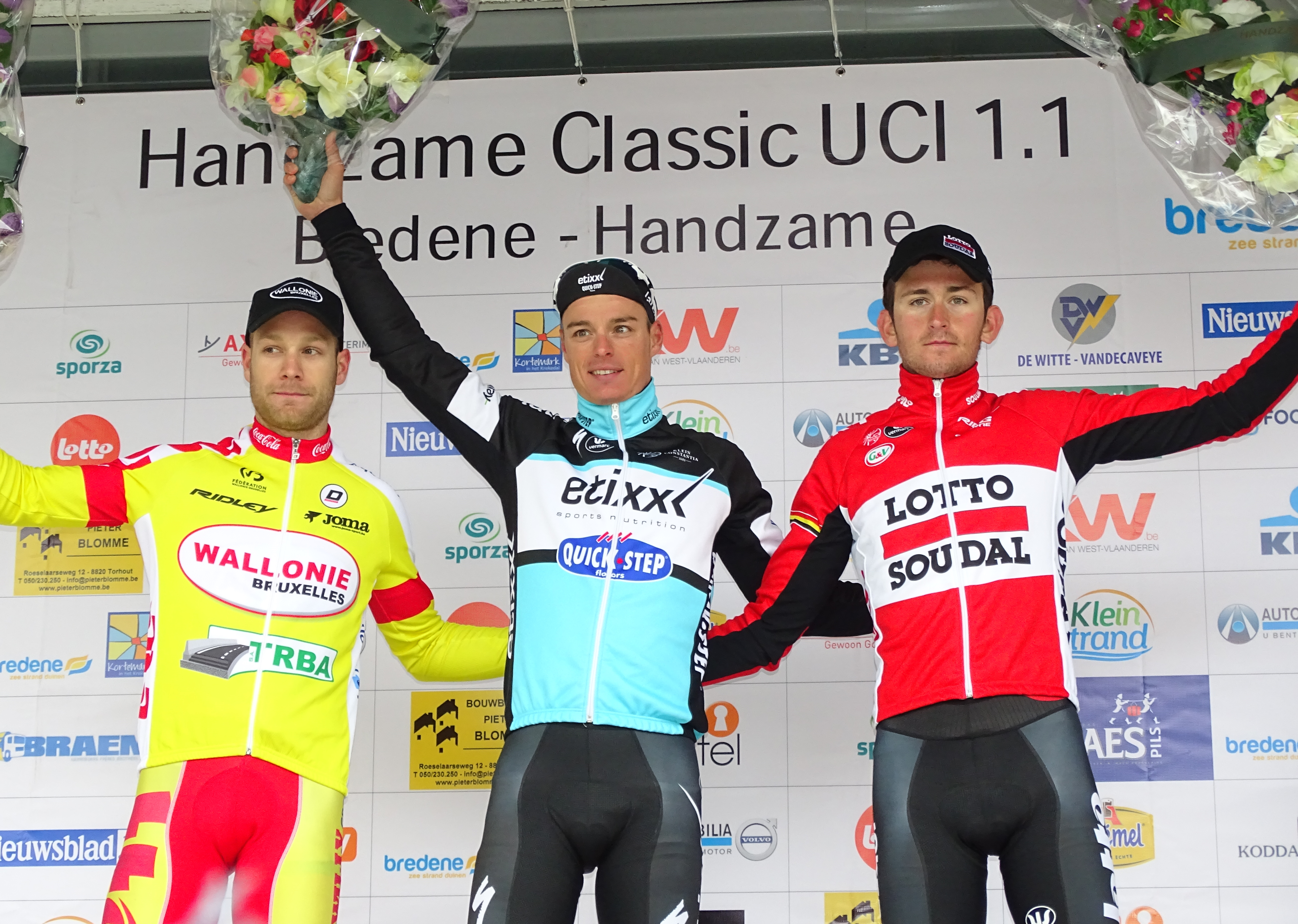
Handzame Classic podium: Antoine Demoitié (2nd), Gianni Meersman (1st) and Tiesj Benoot (3rd).

Date	Race name	Location	UCI Rating	Winner	Team	Ref
1 March	Gran Premio di Lugano	Switzerland	1.HC	Niccolò Bonifazio (ITA)	Lampre–Merida	
1 March	Kuurne–Brussels–Kuurne	Belgium	1.1	Mark Cavendish (GBR)	Etixx–Quick-Step	
1 March	La Drôme Classic	France	1.1	Samuel Dumoulin (FRA)	AG2R La Mondiale	
1 March	Clássica Loulé	Portugal	1.2	Michael Woods (CAN)	Optum–Kelly Benefit Strategies	
1 March	GP Izola	Slovenia	1.2	Gregor Mühlberger (AUT)	Team Felbermayr–Simplon Wels	
4 March	Le Samyn	Belgium	1.1	Kris Boeckmans (BEL)	Lotto–Soudal	
4 March	Trofej Umag	Croatia	1.2	Marko Kump (SLO)	Adria Mobil	
6–8 March	Driedaagse van West-Vlaanderen	Belgium	2.1	Yves Lampaert (BEL)	Etixx–Quick-Step	
7 March	Strade Bianche	Italy	1.HC	Zdeněk Štybar (CZE)	Etixx–Quick-Step	
7 March	Poreč Trophy	Croatia	1.2	Marko Kump (SLO)	Adria Mobil	
7–8 March	GP Internacional do Guadiana	Portugal	2.2	Jordi Simón (ESP)	Team Ecuador	
8 March	Dorpenomloop Rucphen	Netherlands	1.2	Floris Gerts (NED)	BMC Development Team	
12–15 March	Istrian Spring Trophy	Croatia	2.2	Markus Eibegger (AUT)	Synergy Baku	
14 March	Ronde van Drenthe	Netherlands	1.1	Edward Theuns (BEL)	Topsport Vlaanderen–Baloise	
15 March	Dwars door Drenthe	Netherlands	1.1	Manuel Belletti (ITA)	Southeast Pro Cycling	
15 March	Paris–Troyes	France	1.2	David Menut (FRA)	Auber 93	
15 March	Kattekoers	Belgium	1.2	Baptiste Planckaert (BEL)	Roubaix–Lille Métropole	
15 March	Omloop van het Waasland	Belgium	1.2	Geert van der Weijst (NED)	Team3M	
17 March	Sochi Cup	Russia	1.2	Uladzimir Harakhavik (BLR)	Belarus (national team)	
18 March	Nokere Koerse	Belgium	1.1	Kris Boeckmans (BEL)	Lotto–Soudal	
18 March	Grand Prix of Sochi Mayor	Russia	1.2	Sergey Firsanov (RUS)	RusVelo	
19 March	Gran Premio Nobili Rubinetterie	Italy	1.HC	Giacomo Nizzolo (ITA)	Trek Factory Racing	
19–22 March	Grand Prix of Sochi	Russia	2.2	Alexander Foliforov (RUS)	RusVelo	
20 March	Handzame Classic	Belgium	1.1	Gianni Meersman (BEL)	Etixx–Quick-Step	
21 March	Ronde van Zeeland	Netherlands	1.1	Iljo Keisse (BEL)	Etixx–Quick-Step	
21 March	Classic Loire Atlantique	France	1.1	Alexis Gougeard (FRA)	AG2R La Mondiale	
21–22 March	GP Sudoeste e Costa Vicentina	Portugal	2.2	Ruben Guerreiro (POR)	Axeon Cycling Team	
22 March	Cholet-Pays de Loire	France	1.1	Pierrick Fédrigo (FRA)	Bretagne–Séché Environnement	
23–29 March	Tour de Normandie	France	2.2	Dimitri Claeys (BEL)	Verandas Willems	
24–27 March	Tour of Çanakkale	Turkey	2.2	Ahmet Akdilek (TUR)	Torku Şekerspor	
25 March	Dwars door Vlaanderen	Belgium	1.HC	Jelle Wallays (BEL)	Topsport Vlaanderen–Baloise	
25–29 March	Volta ao Alentejo	Portugal	2.2	Paweł Bernas (POL)	ActiveJet	
26 March	Classica Corsica	France	1.1	Thomas Boudat (FRA)	Team Europcar	
26–29 March	Settimana Internazionale di Coppi e Bartali	Italy	2.1	Louis Meintjes (RSA)	MTN–Qhubeka	
28–29 March	Critérium International	France	2.HC	Jean-Christophe Péraud (FRA)	AG2R La Mondiale	
31 March–2 April	Three Days of De Panne	Belgium	2.HC	Alexander Kristoff (NOR)	Team Katusha	

=== April ===
Date	Race name	Location	UCI Rating	Winner	Team	Ref
1 April	Krasnodar–Anapa	Russia	1.2	Andrey Solomennikov (RUS)	RusVelo	
2–5 April	Tour of Kuban	Russia	2.2	Dmitry Samokhvalov (RUS)	Itera–Katusha	
3 April	Route Adélie	France	1.1	Romain Feillu (FRA)	Bretagne–Séché Environnement	
3–6 April	Triptyque des Monts et Châteaux	Belgium	2.2	Lilian Calmejane (FRA)	Vendée U	
4 April	Volta Limburg Classic	Netherlands	1.1	Stefan Küng (SUI)	BMC Racing Team	
4 April	GP Miguel Induráin	Spain	1.1	Ángel Vicioso (ESP)	Team Katusha	
5 April	Vuelta a La Rioja	Spain	1.1	Caleb Ewan (AUS)	Orica–GreenEDGE	
5 April	Paris–Camembert	France	1.1	Julien Loubet (FRA)	Team Marseille 13 KTM	
5 April	GP Adria Mobil	Slovenia	1.2	Marko Kump (SLO)	Adria Mobil	
5 April	Trofeo PIVA	Italy	1.2U	Felix Großschartner (AUT)	Team Felbermayr–Simplon Wels	
6 April	Giro del Belvedere	Italy	1.2U	Andrea Vendrame (ITA)	Zalf-Euromobil-Désirée-Fior	
7–10 April	Circuit de la Sarthe	France	2.1	Ramūnas Navardauskas (LTU)	Cannondale–Garmin	
8 April	Scheldeprijs	Belgium	1.HC	Alexander Kristoff (NOR)	Team Katusha	
9–12 April	Tour of Mersin	Turkey	2.2	Oleksandr Polivoda (UKR)	Kolss BDC Team	
10–12 April	Circuit des Ardennes	France	2.2	Evaldas Šiškevičius (LTU)	Team Marseille 13 KTM	
11 April	Trofeo Edil C	Italy	1.2	Francesco Reda (ITA)	Team Idea 2010 ASD	
11 April	Ronde Van Vlaanderen Beloften	Belgium	1.Ncup	Alexander Edmondson (AUS)	Australia (national team)	
12 April	Klasika Primavera	Spain	1.1	José Herrada (ESP)	Movistar Team	
15 April	Brabantse Pijl	Belgium	1.HC	Ben Hermans (BEL)	BMC Racing Team	
15 April	Maykop–Ulyap–Maykop	Russia	1.2	Ivan Balykin (RUS)	RusVelo	
15 April	La Côte Picarde	France	1.Ncup	Simone Consonni (ITA)	Italy (national team)	
15–19 April	Tour du Loir-et-Cher	France	2.2	Romain Cardis (FRA)	Vendée U	
16 April	Grand Prix de Denain	France	1.1	Nacer Bouhanni (FRA)	Cofidis	
16–19 April	Grand Prix of Adygeya	Russia	2.2	Sergey Firsanov (RUS)	RusVelo	
17–18 April	ZLM Tour	Netherlands	2.Ncup	Søren Kragh Andersen (DEN)	Denmark (national team)	
17–19 April	Vuelta a Castilla y León	Spain	2.1	Pierre Rolland (FRA)	Team Europcar	
18 April	Tour du Finistère	France	1.1	Tim De Troyer (BEL)	Intermarché–Wanty	
18 April	Arno Wallaard Memorial	Netherlands	1.2	Jasper Bovenhuis (NED)	SEG Racing	
18 April	Belgrade Banjaluka I	Serbia	1.2	Marko Kump (SLO)	Kolesarski Klub Novo Mesto	
18 April	Liège–Bastogne–Liège Espoirs	Belgium	1.2U	Guillaume Martin (FRA)	France (national team)	
19 April	Tro-Bro Léon	France	1.1	Alexandre Geniez (FRA)	FDJ	
19 April	Ronde van Noord-Holland	Netherlands	1.2	Johim Ariesen (NED)	Metec-TKH Cycling Team p/b Mantel	
19 April	Belgrade Banjaluka II	Bosnia and Herzegovina	1.2	Andi Bajc (SLO)	Amplatz-BMC	
21–24 April	Giro del Trentino	Italy	2.HC	Richie Porte (AUS)	Team Sky	
22–26 April	Tour of Croatia	Croatia	2.1	Maciej Paterski (POL)	CCC–Sprandi–Polkowice	
25 April	Zuid Oost Drenthe Classic	Netherlands	1.2	Jeff Vermeulen (NED)	Cyclingteam Jo Piels	
25 April	Gran Premio della Liberazione	Italy	1.2U	Lucas Gaday (ARG)	Unieuro–Wilier	
25 April–1 May	Tour de Bretagne Cycliste	France	2.2	Sébastien Delfosse (BEL)	Wallonie-Bruxelles	
26 April	La Roue Tourangelle	France	1.1	Lorenzo Manzin (FRA)	FDJ	
26 April	Giro dell'Appennino	Italy	1.1	Omar Fraile (ESP)	Caja Rural–Seguros RGA	
26 April	Rutland-Melton Classic	United Kingdom	1.2	Steele Von Hoff (AUS)	NFTO	
26 April	Paris–Mantes-en-Yvelines	France	1.2	Nicolas Baldo (FRA)	Team Vorarlberg	
26 April–3 May	Presidential Cycling Tour of Turkey	Turkey	2.HC	Kristijan Đurasek (CRO)	Lampre–Merida	
28 April–3 May	Carpathian Couriers Race	Poland	2.2U	Tim Ariesen (NED)	Cyclingteam Jo Piels	

=== May ===
Date	Race name	Location	UCI Rating	Winner	Team	Ref
1–3 May	Tour de Yorkshire	United Kingdom	2.1	Lars Petter Nordhaug (NOR)	Team Sky	
1 May	Moscow Cup	Russia	1.2	Sergiy Lagkuti (UKR)	Kolss BDC Team	
1 May	Memoriał Andrzeja Trochanowskiego	Poland	1.2	Mateusz Nowak (POL)	Domin Sport	
1 May	Destination Thy	Denmark	1.2	Oscar Landa (NOR)	Team Coop-Øster Hus	
2–3 May	Vuelta a Asturias	Spain	2.1	Igor Antón (ESP)	Movistar Team	
2 May	Ronde van Overijssel	Netherlands	1.2	Jeff Vermeulen (NED)	Cyclingteam Jo Piels	
2 May	Memorial Oleg Dyachenko	Russia	1.2	Mykhaylo Kononenko (UKR)	Kolss BDC Team	
2 May	Memoriał Romana Siemińskiego	Poland	1.2	Alois Kaňkovský (CZE)	Whirlpool–Author	
2 May	Himmerland Rundt	Denmark	1.2	Wim Stroetinga (NED)	Parkhotel Valkenburg	
3 May	Grand Prix of Moscow	Russia	1.2	Siarhei Papok (BLR)	Minsk Cycling Club	
3 May	Circuito del Porto	Italy	1.2	Riccardo Minali (ITA)	Team Colpack	
3 May	GP de la Somme	France	1.1	Quentin Jaurégui (FRA)	AG2R La Mondiale	
3 May	Skive-Løbet	Denmark	1.2	Alexander Kamp (DEN)	Team ColoQuick	
5–9 May	Five Rings of Moscow	Russia	2.2	Oleksandr Polivoda (UKR)	Kolss BDC Team	
6–10 May	Four Days of Dunkirk	France	2.HC	Ignatas Konovalovas (LIT)	Team Marseille 13 KTM	
6–10 May	Tour d'Azerbaïdjan	Azerbaijan	2.1	Primož Roglič (SLO)	Adria Mobil	
6–9 May	Szlakiem Grodów Piastowskich	Poland	2.1	Paweł Bernas (POL)	ActiveJet	
9–10 May	Vuelta a la Comunidad de Madrid	Spain	2.1	Evgeny Shalunov (RUS)	Lokosphinx	
9 May	Tour de Berne	Switzerland	1.2	Tom Bohli (SUI)	BMC Development Team	
9 May	Scandinavian Race	Sweden	1.2	Nicolai Brøchner (DEN)	Riwal Platform	
9 May	Hadeland GP	Norway	1.2	Søren Kragh Andersen (DEN)	Team TreFor–Blue Water	
10 May	Flèche Ardennaise	Belgium	1.2	Loïc Vliegen (BEL)	BMC Development Team	
10 May	Trofeo Città di San Vendemiano	Italy	1.2U	Gianni Moscon (ITA)	Zalf-Euromobil-Désirée-Fior	
10 May	Ringerike GP	Norway	1.2	Asbjørn Andersen (DEN)	Team TreFor–Blue Water	
10 May	GP de la ville de Nogent-sur-Oise	France	1.2	Robin Stenuit (BEL)	Veranclassic-Ekoi	
12–17 May	Olympia's Tour	Netherlands	2.2	Jetse Bol (NED)	Cyclingteam de Rijke	
13–17 May	Bayern-Rundfahrt	Germany	2.HC	Alex Dowsett (GBR)	Movistar Team	
13–17 May	Flèche du Sud	Luxembourg	2.2	Víctor de la Parte (ESP)	Team Vorarlberg	
14–17 May	Rhône-Alpes Isère Tour	France	2.2	Sam Oomen (NED)	Rabobank Development Team	
14–16 May	Tour de Berlin	Germany	2.2U	Steven Lammertink (NED)	SEG Racing	
15–17 May	Tour de Picardie	France	2.1	Kris Boeckmans (BEL)	Lotto–Soudal	
16–19 May	Tour of Black Sea	Turkey	2.2	Tomasz Marczyński (POL)	Torku Şekerspor	
16 May	GP Czech Republic	Czech Republic	1.2	Paweł Bernas (POL)	ActiveJet Team	
17–24 May	An Post Rás	Ireland	2.2	Lukas Pöstlberger (AUT)	Tirol Cycling Team	
17 May	GP Industrie del Marmo	Italy	1.2	Gianmarco Di Francesco (ITA)	MG.K Vis–Vega	
17 May	Grand Prix Criquielion	Belgium	1.2	Jelle Wallays (BEL)	Topsport Vlaanderen–Baloise	
17 May	GP Polski Via Odra	Poland	1.2	Bartosz Warchoł (POL)	Cycling Academy	
20–24 May	Bałtyk–Karkonosze Tour	Poland	2.2	Leszek Pluciński (POL)	CCC–Sprandi–Polkowice	
20–24 May	Tour of Norway	Norway	2.HC	Jesper Hansen (DEN)	Tinkoff–Saxo	
21–24 May	Ronde de l'Isard	France	2.2U	Simone Petilli (ITA)	Unieuro–Wilier	
22–24 May	Paris–Arras Tour	France	2.2	Joeri Calleeuw (BEL)	Verandas Willems	
23 May	GP Hungary	Hungary	1.2	Alois Kaňkovský (CZE)	Whirlpool–Author	
23–24 May	World Ports Classic	Belgium; Netherlands	2.1	Kris Boeckmans (BEL)	Lotto–Soudal	
24 May	GP Slovakia	Slovakia	1.2	Alois Kaňkovský (CZE)	Whirlpool–Author	
27–31 May	Tour des Fjords	Norway	2.1	Marco Haller (AUT)	Team Katusha	
27–31 May	Tour of Belgium	Belgium	2.HC	Greg Van Avermaet (BEL)	BMC Racing Team	
29–31 May	Course de la Paix U-23	Czech Republic	2.Ncup	Gregor Mühlberger (AUT)	Team Felbermayr–Simplon Wels	
29–30 May	Tour of Estonia	Estonia	2.1	Martin Laas (EST)	Estonia (national team)	
29–31 May	Tour de Gironde	France	2.2	Stéphane Poulhies (FRA)	Occitane Cyclisme Formation	
29 May	Race Horizon Park for Peace	Ukraine	1.2	Sergiy Lagkuti (UKR)	Kolss BDC Team	
30 May	Race Horizon Park Maidan	Ukraine	1.2	Oleksandr Polivoda (UKR)	Kolss BDC Team	
30 May	GP de Plumelec-Morbihan	France	1.1	Alexis Vuillermoz (FRA)	AG2R La Mondiale	
31 May	Race Horizon Park Classic	Ukraine	1.2	Mykhaylo Kononenko (UKR)	Kolss BDC Team	
31 May	Boucles de l'Aulne	France	1.1	Alo Jakin (EST)	Auber 93	
31 May	Paris–Roubaix Espoirs	France	1.2U	Lukas Spengler (SUI)	BMC Development Team	
31 May	Velothon Berlin	Germany	1.1	Ramon Sinkeldam (NED)	Team Giant–Alpecin	

=== June ===
Date	Race name	Location	UCI Rating	Winner	Team	Ref
2 June	Trofeo Alcide Degasperi	Italy	1.2	Alberto Cecchin (ITA)	Roth-Skoda	
3–7 June	Tour de Luxembourg	Luxembourg	2.HC	Linus Gerdemann (GER)	Cult Energy Pro Cycling	
4–7 June	Boucles de la Mayenne	France	2.1	Anthony Turgis (FRA)	Cofidis	
6 June	Grand Prix of Vinnytsia	Ukraine	1.2	Vitaliy Buts (UKR)	Kolss BDC Team	
7 June	Coppa della Pace	Italy	1.2	Simone Velasco (ITA)	Zalf-Euromobil-Désirée-Fior	
7 June	Memorial Van Coningsloo	Belgium	1.2	Robin Stenuit (BEL)	Veranclassic-Ekoi	
7 June	Grand Prix of ISD	Ukraine	1.2	Andriy Khripta (UKR)	Kyiv Capital Racing	
10–13 June	Tour of Ankara	Turkey	2.2	Nazim Bakirci (TUR)	Torku Şekerspor	
10–14 June	Tour de Slovaquie	Slovakia	2.2	Davide Viganò (ITA)	Team Idea 2010 ASD	
11–14 June	Ronde de l'Oise	France	2.2	Josh Edmondson (GBR)	An Post–Chain Reaction	
11 June	GP du canton d'Argovie	Switzerland	1.HC	Alexander Kristoff (NOR)	Team Katusha	
12–14 June	Tour of Małopolska	Poland	2.2	Marko Kump (SLO)	Adria Mobil	
13 June	GP Horsens	Denmark	1.2	Alexander Kamp (DEN)	ColoQuick	
14 June	Ronde van Limburg	Belgium	1.1	Björn Leukemans (BEL)	Wanty–Groupe Gobert	
14 June	Grand Prix Sarajevo	Bosnia and Herzegovina	1.2	Gašper Katrašnik (SLO)	Sava Kranj	
14 June	Rund um Köln	Germany	1.1	Tom Boonen (BEL)	Etixx–Quick-Step	
14 June	Raiffeisen Grand Prix	Austria	1.2	Gregor Mühlberger (AUT)	Team Felbermayr–Simplon Wels	
14 June	Velothon Wales	United Kingdom	1.1	Martin Mortensen (DEN)	Cult Energy Pro Cycling	
14 June	Fyen Rundt	Denmark	1.2	Andreas Vangstad (NOR)	Team Sparebanken Sør	
17–21 June	Ster ZLM Toer	Netherlands	2.1	André Greipel (GER)	Lotto–Soudal	
18–21 June	Tour de Serbie	Serbia	2.2	Ivan Savitskiy (RUS)	RusVelo	
18–21 June	Tour of Slovenia	Slovenia	2.1	Primož Roglič (SLO)	Adria Mobil	
18–21 June	Oberösterreichrundfahrt	Austria	2.2	Gregor Mühlberger (AUT)	Team Felbermayr–Simplon Wels	
18–21 June	Route du Sud	France	2.1	Alberto Contador (ESP)	Tinkoff–Saxo	
18–21 June	Tour des Pays de Savoie	France	2.2	David Belda (ESP)	Burgos BH	
20 June	Korona Kocich Gór	Poland	1.2	František Sisr (CZE)	Team Dukla Praha	
21 June	Beaumont Trophy	United Kingdom	1.2	Christopher Latham (GBR)	Great Britain (national team)	
21 June	Circuit de Wallonie	Belgium	1.2	Stef Van Zummeren (BEL)	Verandas Willems	
21 June	Memorial Grundmanna Wizowskiego	Poland	1.2	Adam Stachowiak (POL)	Kolss BDC Team	
24 June	Internationale Wielertrofee Jong Maar Moedig	Belgium	1.2	Dimitri Claeys (BEL)	Verandas Willems	
24 June	Halle–Ingooigem	Belgium	1.1	Nacer Bouhanni (FRA)	Cofidis	

=== July ===
Date	Race name	Location	UCI Rating	Winner	Team	Ref
1–5 July	Cycling Tour of Sibiu	Romania	2.1	Mauro Finetto (ITA)	Southeast Pro Cycling	
1–4 July	Course de la Solidarité Olympique	Poland	2.2	Johim Ariesen (NED)	Metec-TKH Cycling Team p/b Mantel	
4–12 July	Österreich Rundfahrt	Austria	2.HC	Víctor de la Parte (ESP)	Team Vorarlberg	
4 July	Grand Prix Minsk	Belarus	1.2	Siarhei Papok (BLR)	Minsk Cycling Club	
4 July	Omloop Het Nieuwsblad U23	Belgium	1.2	Floris Gerts (NED)	BMC Development Team	
5 July	Paris-Chauny	France	1.2	Maxime Vantomme (BEL)	Roubaix–Lille Métropole	
5 July	Minsk Cup	Belarus	1.2	Oleksandr Golovash (UKR)	Kolss BDC Team	
9–12 July	Troféu Joaquim Agostinho	Portugal	2.2	João Benta (POR)	Louletano–Ray Just Energy	
12 July	Giro del Medio Brenta	Italy	1.2	Michele Gazzara (ITA)	MG.Kvis-Vega	
14–19 July	Giro della Valle d'Aosta	Italy	2.2U	Robert Power (AUS)	Australia (national team)	
16–19 July	Volta a Portugal do Futuro	Portugal	2.2U	Julen Amezqueta (ESP)	Baqué-Campos	
19 July	Trofeo Matteotti	Italy	1.1	Evgeny Shalunov (RUS)	Lokosphinx	
19 July	Dwars door de Vlaamse Ardennen	Belgium	1.2	Stijn Steels (BEL)	Topsport Vlaanderen–Baloise	
22 July	Grand Prix Pino Cerami	Belgium	1.1	Philippe Gilbert (BEL)	BMC Racing Team	
24–26 July	Podlasie Tour	Poland	2.2	Andriy Vasylyuk (UKR)	Kolss BDC Team	
25–29 July	Tour de Wallonie	Belgium	2.HC	Niki Terpstra (NED)	Etixx–Quick-Step	
25 July	Prueba Villafranca de Ordizia	Spain	1.1	Ángel Madrazo (ESP)	Caja Rural–Seguros RGA	
26 July	GP Ville de Pérenchies	France	1.2	Dimitri Claeys (BEL)	Verandas Willems	
26 July	Coppa dei Laghi – Trofeo Almar	Italy	1.Ncup	Gianni Moscon (ITA)	Italy national team	
28 Jul–1 Aug	Dookoła Mazowsza	Poland	2.2	Grzegorz Stępniak (POL)	CCC–Sprandi–Polkowice	
29 Jul–9 Aug	Volta a Portugal	Portugal	2.1	Gustavo César Veloso (ESP)	W52–Quinta da Lixa	
29 Jul–2 Aug	Tour Alsace	France	2.2	Vegard Stake Laengen (NOR)	Team Joker	
31 Jul–9 Aug	Tour de Guadeloupe	France	2.2	Boris Carène (FRA)	Baie-Mahault	
31 July	Circuito de Getxo	Spain	1.1	Nacer Bouhanni (FRA)	Cofidis	

=== August ===
Date	Race name	Location	UCI Rating	Winner	Team	Ref
1–3 August	Kreiz Breizh Elites	France	2.2	August Jensen (NOR)	Team Coop-Øster Hus	
1 August	Odessa Grand Prix 1	Ukraine	1.2	Oleksandr Polivoda (UKR)	Kolss BDC Team	
2 August	Trofeo Bastianelli	Italy	1.2	Michele Gazzara (ITA)	MG.Kvis-Vega	
2 August	RideLondon–Surrey Classic	United Kingdom	1.HC	Jempy Drucker (LUX)	BMC Racing Team	
2 August	Polynormande	France	1.1	Oliver Naesen (BEL)	Topsport Vlaanderen–Baloise	
2 August	Odessa Grand Prix 2	Ukraine	1.2	Vitaliy Buts (UKR)	Kolss BDC Team	
4–9 August	Tour de Hongrie	Hungary	2.2	Tom Thill (LUX)	Differdange–Losch	
4–8 August	Vuelta a Burgos	Spain	2.HC	Rein Taaramäe (EST)	Astana	
4–8 August	Danmark Rundt	Denmark	2.HC	Christopher Juul-Jensen (DEN)	Tinkoff–Saxo	
6–8 August	Tour of Szeklerland	Romania	2.2	Clemens Fankhauser (AUT)	Hrinkow Advarics Cycleangteam	
7 August	European Road Championships – Time Trial	Estonia	CC	Steven Lammertink (NED)	Netherlands (national team)	
8 August	Memoriał Henryka Łasaka	Poland	1.2	Alois Kaňkovský (CZE)	Whirlpool-Author	
9 August	European Road Championships – Road Race	Estonia	CC	Erik Baška (SVK)	Slovakia (national team)	
9 August	GP di Poggiana	Italy	1.2U	Stefano Nardelli (ITA)	Unieuro–Wilier	
9 August	Puchar Uzdrowisk Karpackich	Poland	1.2	Adrian Honkisz (POL)	CCC–Sprandi–Polkowice	
9 August	Antwerpse Havenpijl	Belgium	1.2	Aidis Kruopis (LTU)	An Post–Chain Reaction	
11–15 August	Tour de l'Ain	France	2.1	Alexandre Geniez (FRA)	FDJ	
13–16 August	Arctic Race of Norway	Norway	2.HC	Rein Taaramäe (EST)	Astana	
13–16 August	Czech Cycling Tour	Czech Republic	2.1	Petr Vakoč (CZE)	Etixx–Quick-Step	
16 August	GP Capodarco	Italy	1.2	Riccardo Donato (ITA)	Selle Italia-Cieffe-Ursus	
18 August	Grote Prijs Stad Zottegem	Belgium	1.1	Kenny Dehaes (BEL)	Lotto–Soudal	
18–21 August	Tour du Limousin	France	2.1	Sonny Colbrelli (ITA)	Bardiani–CSF	
18–20 August	Baltic Chain Tour	Estonia; Latvia	2.2	Andriy Kulyk (UKR)	Kolss BDC Team	
21 August	Arnhem–Veenendaal Classic	Netherlands	1.1	Dylan Groenewegen (NED)	Team Roompot	
22–29 August	Tour de l'Avenir	France	2.Ncup	Marc Soler (ESP)	Spain (national team)	
22 August	Puchar Ministra Obrony Narodowej	Poland	1.2	Erik Baška (SVK)	AWT–GreenWay	
23 August	GP Jef Scherens	Belgium	1.1	Björn Leukemans (BEL)	Wanty–Groupe Gobert	
25–28 August	Tour du Poitou-Charentes	France	2.1	Tony Martin (GER)	Etixx–Quick-Step	
25 August	GP des Marbriers	France	1.2	Tim Ariesen (NED)	Cyclingteam Jo Piels	
26 August	Druivenkoers Overijse	Belgium	1.1	Jérôme Baugnies (BEL)	Wanty–Groupe Gobert	
29–30 August	Ronde van Midden-Nederland	Netherlands	2.2	Olivier Pardini (BEL)	Verandas Willems	
30 August–3 September	Tour of Bulgaria	Bulgaria	2.2	Stefan Hristov (BUL)	Brisaspor	
30 August	Schaal Sels-Merksem	Belgium	1.1	Robin Stenuit (BEL)	Wanty–Groupe Gobert	
30 August	Croatia–Slovenia	Slovenia	1.2	Marko Kump (SLO)	Adria Mobil	

=== September ===
Date	Race name	Location	UCI Rating	Winner	Team	Ref
5–6 September	Black Sea Cycling Tour	Bulgaria	2.2	Vitaliy Buts (UKR)	Kolss BDC Team	
5 September	Brussels Cycling Classic	Belgium	1.HC	Dylan Groenewegen (NED)	Team Roompot	
6–13 September	Tour of Britain	United Kingdom	2.HC	Edvald Boasson Hagen (NOR)	MTN–Qhubeka	
6 September	GP de Fourmies	France	1.HC	Fabio Felline (ITA)	Trek Factory Racing	
6 September	Kernen Omloop Echt-Susteren	Netherlands	1.2	Max Walscheid (GER)	Team Kuota–Lotto	
10–12 September	Giro del Friuli Venezia Giulia	Italy	2.2	Gaëtan Bille (BEL)	{{{team name}}}	
11–13 September	East Bohemia Tour	Czech Republic	2.2	Jan Tratnik (SLO)	Amplatz–BMC	
12 September	De Kustpijl Heist	Belgium	1.2	Marco Zanotti (ITA)	Parkhotel Valkenburg Continental Team	
13 September	Tour du Doubs	France	1.1	Eduardo Sepúlveda (ARG)	Bretagne–Séché Environnement	
13 September	Velothon Stockholm	Sweden	1.1	Marko Kump (SLO)	Adria Mobil	
13 September	Chrono Champenois	France	1.2	Filippo Ganna (ITA)	Lampre–Merida	
16 September	GP de Wallonie	Belgium	1.1	Jens Debusschere (BEL)	Lotto–Soudal	
16 September	Coppa Ugo Agostoni	Italy	1.1	Davide Rebellin (ITA)	CCC–Sprandi–Polkowice	
17 September	Coppa Bernocchi	Italy	1.1	Vincenzo Nibali (ITA)	Astana	
18 September	Kampioenschap van Vlaanderen	Belgium	1.1	Michał Gołaś (POL)	Etixx–Quick-Step	
19 September	Memorial Marco Pantani	Italy	1.1	Diego Ulissi (ITA)	Lampre–Merida	
19 September	GP Impanis-Van Petegem	Belgium	1.HC	Sean De Bie (BEL)	Lotto–Soudal	
20 September	Grand Prix d'Isbergues	France	1.1	Nacer Bouhanni (FRA)	Cofidis	
20 September	Rund um Sebnitz	Germany	1.2	Maximilian Kuen (AUT)	Amplatz – BMC	
20 September	Gran Premio Industria e Commercio di Prato	Italy	1.1	Daniele Bennati (ITA)	Tinkoff–Saxo	
23 September	Omloop van het Houtland	Belgium	1.1	Jens Debusschere (BEL)	Lotto–Soudal	
26–27 September	Tour du Gévaudan	France	2.1	Thibaut Pinot (FRA)	FDJ	
27 September	Gooikse Pijl	Belgium	1.2	Oliver Naesen (BEL)	Topsport Vlaanderen–Baloise	
27 September	Duo Normand	France	1.1	Victor Campenaerts (BEL); Jelle Wallays (BEL)	Topsport Vlaanderen–Baloise	
29 September	Ruota d'Oro	Italy	1.2U	Simone Velasco (ITA)	Zalf-Euromobil-Désirée-Fior	
30 September	Tre Valli Varesine	Italy	1.HC	Vincenzo Nibali (ITA)	Astana	
30 September–4 October	Tour de l'Eurometropole	Belgium	2.1	Alexis Gougeard (FRA)	AG2R La Mondiale	

=== October ===
Date	Race name	Location	UCI Rating	Winner	Team	Ref
1 October	Milano–Torino	Italy	1.HC	Diego Rosa (ITA)	Astana	
2 October	Giro del Piemonte	Italy	1.HC	Jan Bakelants (BEL)	AG2R La Mondiale	
3 October	Piccolo Giro di Lombardia	Italy	1.2U	Fausto Masnada (ITA)	Team Colpack	
3 October	Sparkassen Münsterland Giro	Germany	1.HC	Tom Boonen (BEL)	Etixx–Quick-Step	
4 October	Tour de Vendée	France	1.1	Christophe Laporte (FRA)	Cofidis	
6 October	Binche–Tournai–Binche	Belgium	1.1	Ramon Sinkeldam (NED)	Team Giant–Alpecin	
7–10 October	Tour of Mevlana	Turkey	2.2	Ahmet Örken (TUR)	Torku Şekerspor	
8 October	Paris–Bourges	France	1.1	Sam Bennett (IRE)	Bora–Argon 18	
8 October	Coppa Sabatini	Italy	1.1	Eduard Prades (ESP)	Caja Rural–Seguros RGA	
10 October	Giro dell'Emilia	Italy	1.HC	Jan Bakelants (BEL)	AG2R La Mondiale	
11 October	GP Bruno Beghelli	Italy	1.HC	Sonny Colbrelli (ITA)	Bardiani–CSF	
11 October	Paris–Tours	France	1.HC	Matteo Trentin (ITA)	Etixx–Quick-Step	
11 October	Paris–Tours Espoirs	France	1.2U	Sam Oomen (NED)	Rabobank Development Team	
13 October	Nationale Sluitingsprijs	Belgium	1.1	Nacer Bouhanni (FRA)	Cofidis	
18 October	Chrono des Nations	France	1.1	Vasil Kiryienka (BLR)	Team Sky	
22–25 October	Tour of Aegean	Turkey	2.2	Ahmet Örken (TUR)	Torku Şekerspor	

== Final standings ==
Rank	Name	Team	Points
1.	Nacer Bouhanni (FRA)	Cofidis	721
2.	Edward Theuns (BEL)	Topsport Vlaanderen–Baloise	649
3.	Dimitri Claeys (BEL)	Verandas Willems	524.25
4.	Edvald Boasson Hagen (NOR)	MTN–Qhubeka	480
5.	Marko Kump (SLO)	Adria Mobil	476
6.	Vitaliy Buts (UKR)	Kolss BDC Team	405
7.	Gaetan Bille (BEL)	Verandas Willems	373.25
8.	Bryan Coquard (FRA)	Team Europcar	373
9.	Davide Rebellin (ITA)	CCC–Sprandi–Polkowice	368
10.	Primož Roglič (SLO)	Adria Mobil	337

Rank	Team	Points
1.	Topsport Vlaanderen–Baloise	1693
2.	Cofidis	1600.2
3.	Bretagne–Séché Environnement	1476
4.	Kolss BDC Team	1383.75
5.	Verandas Willems	1345.25
6.	RusVelo	1300.92
7.	Wanty–Groupe Gobert	1276
8.	CCC–Sprandi–Polkowice	1181
9.	Southeast Pro Cycling	1167.5
10.	Caja Rural–Seguros RGA	966.1

Rank	Nation	Points
1.	Belgium	3364
2.	Italy	2914.3
3.	France	2649.4
4.	Spain	2155.6
5.	Netherlands	1890.25
6.	Slovenia	1882.8
7.	Ukraine	1851.5
8.	Russia	1783.17
9.	Denmark	1457.68
10.	Norway	1451
