= 2015 Tour of Croatia =

2015 UCI Europe Tour
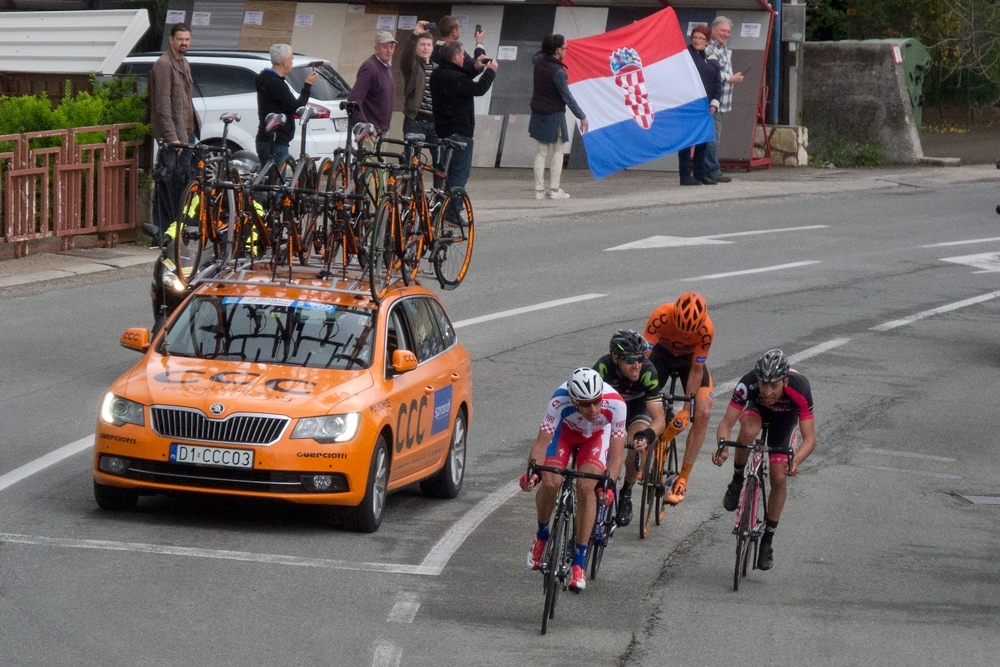
- 1st edition of the race

Race details
- Dates: 22–26 April 2015
- Stages: 5
- Distance: 838 km (521 mi)
- Winning time: 22h 05' 16"

Results
| Jersey awarded to the overall winner | Winner | Maciej Paterski (POL) | (CCC–Sprandi–Polkowice) |
| | Second | Primož Roglič (SLO) | (Adria Mobil) |
| | Third | Sylwester Szmyd (POL) | (CCC–Sprandi–Polkowice) |
| Jersey awarded to the points classification winner | Points | Maciej Paterski (POL) | (CCC–Sprandi–Polkowice) |
| Jersey awarded to the mountains classification winner | Mountains | Maciej Paterski (POL) | (CCC–Sprandi–Polkowice) |
| Jersey awarded to the young rider classification winner | Young rider | Edward Ravasi (ITA) | (Italy (national team)) |
| | Team | (Poland) CCC–Sprandi–Polkowice | |

The 2015 Tour of Croatia was the first edition of the Tour of Croatia cycling stage race. It started on 22 April in Makarska and ended on 26 April in Zagreb, and consisted of five stages. It was part of the 2015 UCI Europe Tour, and was rated as a 2.1 event. The race was won by Maciej Paterski (CCC–Sprandi–Polkowice), who also won two stages, the points classification and the mountains classification. The second-placed rider was Primož Roglič (Adria Mobil), while Paterski's teammate Sylwester Szmyd was third. CCC–Sprandi–Polkowice also won the team competition.

== Race overview ==
| Stage | Date | Route | Distance | Type | Winner |
|---|---|---|---|---|---|
| 1 | 22 April | Makarska to Split | 160 km (99.4 mi) | Hilly stage | Grega Bole (SLO) |
| 2 | 23 April | Šibenik to Zadar | 180 km (111.8 mi) | Hilly stage | Marko Kump (SLO) |
| 3 | 24 April | Plitvice Lakes National Park to Učka | 228 km (141.7 mi) | Intermediate stage | Maciej Paterski (POL) |
| 4 | 25 April | Pula to Umag | 152 km (94.4 mi) | Hilly stage | Dimitri Claeys (BEL) |
| 5 | 26 April | Sveti Martin na Muri to Zagreb | 118 km (73.3 mi) | Flat stage | Maciej Paterski (POL) |
| Total | | 838 km (520.7 mi) | | | |

== Teams ==
19 teams were invited to take part in the race. Three were UCI Professional Continental teams, fifteen were UCI Continental teams, while the peloton was completed by an Italian national team.

UCI Professional Continental teams

- CCC–Sprandi–Polkowice
- Team Novo Nordisk
- RusVelo

UCI Continental teams

- ActiveJet
- Cycling Academy
- Adria Mobil
- D'Amico–Bottecchia
- LKT Team Brandenburg
- Meridiana–Kamen
- Team Felbermayr–Simplon Wels
- MG.K Vis–Vega
- GM Cycling Team
- Team Idea 2010 ASD
- Cyclingteam de Rijke
- Verandas Willems
- Team Ecuador
- Radenska–Ljubljana
- Frøy Oslo

National teams

- Italy

== Stages ==
=== Stage 1 ===
22 April 2015 — Makarska to Split, 160 km (99.4 mi)

Stage 1 result
| Rank | Rider | Team | Time |
|---|---|---|---|
| 1 | Grega Bole (SLO) | CCC–Sprandi–Polkowice | 3h 58' 07" |
| 2 | Maciej Paterski (POL) | CCC–Sprandi–Polkowice | + 0" |
| 3 | Marko Kump (SLO) | Adria Mobil | + 0" |
| 4 | Paweł Franczak (POL) | ActiveJet | + 0" |
| 5 | Jure Miškulin (SLO) | Radenska–Ljubljana | + 0" |
| 6 | Davide Viganò (ITA) | Team Idea 2010 ASD | + 0" |
| 7 | Rok Korošec (SLO) | Radenska–Ljubljana | + 0" |
| 8 | Roman Maikin (RUS) | RusVelo | + 0" |
| 9 | Carl Soballa (GER) | LKT Team Brandenburg | + 0" |
| 10 | Ivan Balykin (RUS) | RusVelo | + 0" |

General classification after stage 1
| Rank | Rider | Team | Time |
|---|---|---|---|
| 1 | Grega Bole (SLO) | CCC–Sprandi–Polkowice | 3h 57' 57" |
| 2 | Maciej Paterski (POL) | CCC–Sprandi–Polkowice | + 4" |
| 3 | Marko Kump (SLO) | Adria Mobil | + 6" |
| 4 | Stef Van Zummeren (BEL) | Verandas Willems | + 7" |
| 5 | Jordi Simón (ESP) | Team Ecuador | + 7" |
| 6 | Felix Großschartner (AUT) | Team Felbermayr–Simplon Wels | + 8" |
| 7 | Łukasz Bodnar (POL) | ActiveJet | + 8" |
| 8 | Jetse Bol (NED) | Cyclingteam de Rijke | + 9" |
| 9 | Mario González (ESP) | ActiveJet | + 9" |
| 10 | Paweł Franczak (POL) | ActiveJet | + 10" |

=== Stage 2 ===
23 April 2015 — Šibenik to Zadar, 180 km (111.8 mi)

Stage 2 result
| Rank | Rider | Team | Time |
|---|---|---|---|
| 1 | Marko Kump (SLO) | Adria Mobil | 4h 50' 40" |
| 2 | Paweł Franczak (POL) | ActiveJet | + 0" |
| 3 | Roman Maikin (RUS) | RusVelo | + 0" |
| 4 | Filippo Fortin (ITA) | GM Cycling Team | + 0" |
| 5 | Davide Viganò (ITA) | Team Idea 2010 ASD | + 0" |
| 6 | Silvio Giorni (ITA) | D'Amico–Bottecchia | + 0" |
| 7 | Jordi Simón (ESP) | Team Ecuador | + 0" |
| 8 | Coen Vermeltfoort (NED) | Cyclingteam de Rijke | + 0" |
| 9 | Liam Bertazzo (ITA) | Italy (national team) | + 0" |
| 10 | Maciej Paterski (POL) | CCC–Sprandi–Polkowice | + 0" |

General classification after stage 2
| Rank | Rider | Team | Time |
|---|---|---|---|
| 1 | Marko Kump (SLO) | Adria Mobil | 8h 48' 32" |
| 2 | Grega Bole (SLO) | CCC–Sprandi–Polkowice | + 5" |
| 3 | Stef Van Zummeren (BEL) | Verandas Willems | + 6" |
| 4 | Paweł Franczak (POL) | ActiveJet | + 9" |
| 5 | Maciej Paterski (POL) | CCC–Sprandi–Polkowice | + 9" |
| 6 | Roman Maikin (RUS) | RusVelo | + 11" |
| 7 | Jordi Simón (ESP) | Team Ecuador | + 12" |
| 8 | Felix Großschartner (AUT) | Team Felbermayr–Simplon Wels | + 13" |
| 9 | Łukasz Bodnar (POL) | ActiveJet | + 13" |
| 10 | Jetse Bol (NED) | Cyclingteam de Rijke | + 14" |

=== Stage 3 ===
24 April 2015 — Plitvice Lakes National Park to Učka, 228 km (141.7 mi)

Stage 3 result
| Rank | Rider | Team | Time |
|---|---|---|---|
| 1 | Maciej Paterski (POL) | CCC–Sprandi–Polkowice | 5h 55' 57" |
| 2 | Primož Roglič (SLO) | Adria Mobil | + 18" |
| 3 | Sylwester Szmyd (POL) | CCC–Sprandi–Polkowice | + 33" |
| 4 | Edward Ravasi (ITA) | Italy (national team) | + 38" |
| 5 | Sergey Firsanov (RUS) | RusVelo | + 51" |
| 6 | Branislau Samoilau (BLR) | CCC–Sprandi–Polkowice | + 1' 20" |
| 7 | Emanuel Kišerlovski (CRO) | Meridiana–Kamen | + 1' 25" |
| 8 | Davide Pacchiardo (ITA) | Italy (national team) | + 2' 11" |
| 9 | Domen Novak (SLO) | Adria Mobil | + 2' 58" |
| 10 | Marek Rutkiewicz (POL) | CCC–Sprandi–Polkowice | + 3' 26" |

General classification after stage 3
| Rank | Rider | Team | Time |
|---|---|---|---|
| 1 | Maciej Paterski (POL) | CCC–Sprandi–Polkowice | 14h 44' 22" |
| 2 | Primož Roglič (SLO) | Adria Mobil | + 34" |
| 3 | Sylwester Szmyd (POL) | CCC–Sprandi–Polkowice | + 51" |
| 4 | Edward Ravasi (ITA) | Italy (national team) | + 1' 00" |
| 5 | Sergey Firsanov (RUS) | RusVelo | + 1' 13" |
| 6 | Branislau Samoilau (BLR) | CCC–Sprandi–Polkowice | + 1' 41" |
| 7 | Emanuel Kišerlovski (CRO) | Meridiana–Kamen | + 1' 47" |
| 8 | Davide Pacchiardo (ITA) | Italy (national team) | + 2' 33" |
| 9 | Marek Rutkiewicz (POL) | CCC–Sprandi–Polkowice | + 3' 48" |
| 10 | Grega Bole (SLO) | CCC–Sprandi–Polkowice | + 3' 56" |

=== Stage 4 ===
25 April 2015 — Pula to Umag, 152 km (94.4 mi)

Stage 4 result
| Rank | Rider | Team | Time |
|---|---|---|---|
| 1 | Dimitri Claeys (BEL) | Verandas Willems | 3h 20' 42" |
| 2 | Paweł Bernas (POL) | ActiveJet | + 0" |
| 3 | Gaëtan Bille (BEL) | Verandas Willems | + 0" |
| 4 | Jure Golčer (SLO) | Team Felbermayr–Simplon Wels | + 2" |
| 5 | Liam Bertazzo (ITA) | Italy (national team) | + 42" |
| 6 | Marko Kump (SLO) | Adria Mobil | + 42" |
| 7 | Rino Gasparrini (ITA) | Italy (national team) | + 42" |
| 8 | Roman Maikin (RUS) | RusVelo | + 42" |
| 9 | Matteo Malucelli (ITA) | Team Idea 2010 ASD | + 42" |
| 10 | Filippo Fortin (ITA) | GM Cycling Team | + 42" |

General classification after stage 4
| Rank | Rider | Team | Time |
|---|---|---|---|
| 1 | Maciej Paterski (POL) | CCC–Sprandi–Polkowice | 18h 05' 46" |
| 2 | Primož Roglič (SLO) | Adria Mobil | + 34" |
| 3 | Sylwester Szmyd (POL) | CCC–Sprandi–Polkowice | + 51" |
| 4 | Edward Ravasi (ITA) | Italy (national team) | + 1' 12" |
| 5 | Sergey Firsanov (RUS) | RusVelo | + 1' 13" |
| 6 | Branislau Samoilau (BLR) | CCC–Sprandi–Polkowice | + 1' 41" |
| 7 | Emanuel Kišerlovski (CRO) | Meridiana–Kamen | + 1' 47" |
| 8 | Davide Pacchiardo (ITA) | Italy (national team) | + 2' 33" |
| 9 | Marek Rutkiewicz (POL) | CCC–Sprandi–Polkowice | + 3' 45" |
| 10 | Grega Bole (SLO) | CCC–Sprandi–Polkowice | + 3' 56" |

=== Stage 5 ===
26 April 2015 — Sveti Martin to Zagreb, 177 km (110 mi)

Stage 5 result
| Rank | Rider | Team | Time |
|---|---|---|---|
| 1 | Maciej Paterski (POL) | CCC–Sprandi–Polkowice | 3h 59' 40" |
| 2 | Felix Großschartner (AUT) | Team Felbermayr–Simplon Wels | + 0" |
| 3 | Roman Maikin (RUS) | RusVelo | + 0" |
| 4 | Olivier Pardini (BEL) | Verandas Willems | + 0" |
| 5 | Joeri Calleeuw (BEL) | Verandas Willems | + 10" |
| 6 | Davide Viganò (ITA) | Team Idea 2010 ASD | + 10" |
| 7 | Marek Rutkiewicz (POL) | CCC–Sprandi–Polkowice | + 14" |
| 8 | Grega Bole (SLO) | CCC–Sprandi–Polkowice | + 17" |
| 9 | Coen Vermeltfoort (NED) | Cyclingteam de Rijke | + 17" |
| 10 | Jordi Simón (ESP) | Team Ecuador | + 17" |

Final general classification
| Rank | Rider | Team | Time |
|---|---|---|---|
| 1 | Maciej Paterski (POL) | CCC–Sprandi–Polkowice | 22h 05' 16" |
| 2 | Primož Roglič (SLO) | Adria Mobil | + 1' 01" |
| 3 | Sylwester Szmyd (POL) | CCC–Sprandi–Polkowice | + 1' 18" |
| 4 | Edward Ravasi (ITA) | Italy (national team) | + 1' 39" |
| 5 | Sergey Firsanov (RUS) | RusVelo | + 1' 40" |
| 6 | Branislau Samoilau (BLR) | CCC–Sprandi–Polkowice | + 2' 17" |
| 7 | Emanuel Kišerlovski (CRO) | Meridiana–Kamen | + 2' 32" |
| 8 | Davide Pacchiardo (ITA) | Italy (national team) | + 3' 18" |
| 9 | Marek Rutkiewicz (POL) | CCC–Sprandi–Polkowice | + 4' 09" |
| 10 | Grega Bole (SLO) | CCC–Sprandi–Polkowice | + 4' 23" |

== Classification leadership table ==
| Stage | Winner | General classification | Points classification | Mountains classification | Young rider classification | Teams classification |
|---|---|---|---|---|---|---|
| 1 | Grega Bole | Grega Bole | Grega Bole | Marco Tizza | Felix Großschartner | RusVelo |
| 2 | Marko Kump | Marko Kump | Marko Kump | Marco Tizza | Felix Großschartner | Adria Mobil |
| 3 | Maciej Paterski | Maciej Paterski | Maciej Paterski | Maciej Paterski | Edward Ravasi | CCC–Sprandi–Polkowice |
| 4 | Dimitri Claeys | Maciej Paterski | Maciej Paterski | Maciej Paterski | Edward Ravasi | CCC–Sprandi–Polkowice |
| 5 | Maciej Paterski | Maciej Paterski | Maciej Paterski | Maciej Paterski | Edward Ravasi | CCC–Sprandi–Polkowice |
| Final | | Maciej Paterski | Maciej Paterski | Maciej Paterski | Edward Ravasi | CCC–Sprandi–Polkowice |
