= 2015 Tour of Belgium =

2015 UCI Europe Tour

Race details
- Dates: 27–31 May
- Stages: 5 (including prologue)
- Distance: 743.15 km (461.8 mi)
- Winning time: 18h 01' 16"

Results
Jersey awarded to the overall winner	Winner	Greg Van Avermaet (BEL)	(BMC Racing Team)
	Second	Tiesj Benoot (BEL)	(Lotto–Soudal)
	Third	Gaëtan Bille (BEL)	(Verandas Willems)
Jersey awarded to the points classification winner	Points	Tom Boonen (BEL)	(Etixx–Quick-Step)
Jersey awarded to the combativity classification winner	Combativity	Philipp Walsleben (GER)	(BKCP–Powerplus)
	Team	BMC Racing Team	

The 2015 Tour of Belgium (known as the 2015 Baloise Belgium Tour for sponsorship purposes) was the 85th edition of the Tour of Belgium cycling stage race. It took place from 27 to 31 May 2015 in Belgium, and was part of the 2015 UCI Europe Tour. It was won by home rider Greg Van Avermaet, riding for the BMC Racing Team.

== Schedule ==
Stage	Date	Course	Distance	Type	Winner	Ref
P	27 May	Bornem to Bornem	6.85 km (4.3 mi)	Individual time trial	Matthias Brändle (AUT)	
1	28 May	Lochristi to Knokke-Heist	178.5 km (110.9 mi)	Flat stage	Tom Boonen (BEL)	
2	29 May	Knokke-Heist to Herzele	201.1 km (125.0 mi)	Flat stage	Arnaud Démare (FRA)	
3	30 May	Eau d'Heure lakes to Eau d'Heure lakes	157.5 km (97.9 mi)	Intermediate stage	Arnaud Démare (FRA)	
4	31 May	St. Vith to St. Vith	199.2 km (123.8 mi)	Intermediate stage	Greg Van Avermaet (BEL)	
Total		743.15 km (461.8 mi)				

== Teams ==
20 teams were invited to the 2015 Tour of Belgium: 8 UCI WorldTeams, 6 UCI Professional Continental teams and 6 UCI Continental teams.

UCI WorldTeams

- Astana
- BMC Racing Team
- Etixx–Quick-Step
- FDJ
- IAM Cycling
- Team Katusha
- LottoNL–Jumbo
- Lotto–Soudal

UCI Professional Continental teams

- Cofidis
- Team Roompot
- RusVelo
- Topsport Vlaanderen–Baloise
- Wanty–Groupe Gobert
- Androni Giocattoli

UCI Continental teams

- Team3M
- BKCP–Powerplus
- Cibel
- Vastgoedservice–Golden Palace
- Verandas Willems
- Wallonie-Bruxelles

== Stages ==
=== Prologue ===
27 May 2015 – Bornem to Bornem, 6.85 km (4.26 mi), individual time trial (ITT)

Prologue result and general classification after Prologue
Rank	Rider	Team	Time
1	Matthias Brändle (AUT)	IAM Cycling	7' 54"
2	Rohan Dennis (AUS)	BMC Racing Team	+ 2"
3	Gaëtan Bille (BEL)	Verandas Willems	+ 9"
4	Martin Elmiger (SWI)	IAM Cycling	+ 9"
5	Greg Van Avermaet (BEL)	BMC Racing Team	+ 11"
6	Jempy Drucker (LUX)	BMC Racing Team	+ 16"
7	William Bonnet (FRA)	FDJ	+ 19"
8	Yves Lampaert (BEL)	Etixx–Quick-Step	+ 19"
9	Guillaume Van Keirsbulck (BEL)	Etixx–Quick-Step	+ 20"
10	David Boucher (BEL)	FDJ	+ 20"

=== Stage 1 ===
28 May 2015 – Lochristi to Knokke-Heist, 178.5 km (110.9 mi)

Stage 1 result
Rank	Rider	Team	Time
1	Tom Boonen (BEL)	Etixx–Quick-Step	4h 19' 21"
2	Arnaud Démare (FRA)	FDJ	+ 0"
3	Jens Debusschere (BEL)	Lotto–Soudal	+ 0"
4	Jonas van Genechten (BEL)	IAM Cycling	+ 0"
5	Dylan Groenewegen (NED)	Team Roompot	+ 0"
6	Jempy Drucker (LUX)	BMC Racing Team	+ 0"
7	Roy Jans (BEL)	Wanty–Groupe Gobert	+ 0"
8	Tom Van Asbroeck (BEL)	LottoNL–Jumbo	+ 0"
9	Yves Lampaert (BEL)	Etixx–Quick-Step	+ 0"
10	Alexey Tsatevich (RUS)	Team Katusha	+ 0"

General classification after stage 1
Rank	Rider	Team	Time
1	Matthias Brändle (AUT)	IAM Cycling	4h 27' 15"
2	Rohan Dennis (AUS)	BMC Racing Team	+ 2"
3	Gaëtan Bille (BEL)	Verandas Willems	+ 9"
4	Martin Elmiger (SWI)	IAM Cycling	+ 9"
5	Greg Van Avermaet (BEL)	BMC Racing Team	+ 11"
6	Jempy Drucker (LUX)	BMC Racing Team	+ 16"
7	Tom Boonen (BEL)	Etixx–Quick-Step	+ 17"
8	Arnaud Démare (FRA)	FDJ	+ 18"
9	William Bonnet (FRA)	FDJ	+ 19"
10	Yves Lampaert (BEL)	Etixx–Quick-Step	+ 19"

=== Stage 2 ===
29 May 2015 – Knokke-Heist to Herzele, 201.1 km (125.0 mi)

Stage 2 result
Rank	Rider	Team	Time
1	Arnaud Démare (FRA)	FDJ	4h 43' 39"
2	Tom Boonen (BEL)	Etixx–Quick-Step	+ 0"
3	Jürgen Roelandts (BEL)	Lotto–Soudal	+ 0"
4	Tom Van Asbroeck (BEL)	LottoNL–Jumbo	+ 0"
5	Mathieu van der Poel (NED)	BKCP–Powerplus	+ 0"
6	Raymond Kreder (NED)	Team Roompot	+ 0"
7	Tiesj Benoot (BEL)	Lotto–Soudal	+ 0"
8	Edward Theuns (BEL)	Topsport Vlaanderen–Baloise	+ 2"
9	Gaëtan Bille (BEL)	Verandas Willems	+ 2"
10	Dennis Coenen (BEL)	Vastgoedservice–Golden Palace	+ 2"

General classification after stage 2
Rank	Rider	Team	Time
1	Matthias Brändle (AUT)	IAM Cycling	9h 10' 56"
2	Arnaud Démare (FRA)	FDJ	+ 6"
3	Gaëtan Bille (BEL)	Verandas Willems	+ 6"
4	Tom Boonen (BEL)	Etixx–Quick-Step	+ 9"
5	Martin Elmiger (SWI)	IAM Cycling	+ 9"
6	Greg Van Avermaet (BEL)	BMC Racing Team	+ 11"
7	Mathieu van der Poel (NED)	BKCP–Powerplus	+ 19"
8	Yves Lampaert (BEL)	Etixx–Quick-Step	+ 19"
9	Jürgen Roelandts (BEL)	Lotto–Soudal	+ 19"
10	Marcel Sieberg (GER)	FDJ	+ 21"

=== Stage 3 ===
30 May 2015 – Eau d'Heure lakes to Eau d'Heure lakes, 157.5 km (97.9 mi)

Stage 3 result
Rank	Rider	Team	Time
1	Arnaud Démare (FRA)	FDJ	3h 52' 50"
2	Tom Boonen (BEL)	Etixx–Quick-Step	+ 0"
3	Jens Debusschere (BEL)	Lotto–Soudal	+ 0"
4	Alexey Tsatevich (RUS)	Team Katusha	+ 0"
5	Jonas Ahlstrand (SWE)	Cofidis	+ 0"
6	Tom Van Asbroeck (BEL)	LottoNL–Jumbo	+ 0"
7	Borut Božič (SLO)	Astana	+ 0"
8	Danilo Napolitano (ITA)	Wanty–Groupe Gobert	+ 0"
9	Mathieu van der Poel (NED)	BKCP–Powerplus	+ 0"
10	Adrien Petit (FRA)	Cofidis	+ 0"

General classification after stage 3
Rank	Rider	Team	Time
1	Matthias Brändle (AUT)	IAM Cycling	13h 03' 41"
2	Arnaud Démare (FRA)	FDJ	+ 1"
3	Greg Van Avermaet (BEL)	BMC Racing Team	+ 8"
4	Tom Boonen (BEL)	Etixx–Quick-Step	+ 8"
5	Gaëtan Bille (BEL)	Verandas Willems	+ 11"
6	Martin Elmiger (SWI)	IAM Cycling	+ 14"
7	Mathieu van der Poel (NED)	BKCP–Powerplus	+ 24"
8	Yves Lampaert (BEL)	Etixx–Quick-Step	+ 24"
9	Jürgen Roelandts (BEL)	Lotto–Soudal	+ 24"
10	Oliver Naesen (BEL)	Topsport Vlaanderen–Baloise	+ 27"

=== Stage 4 ===
31 May 2015 – St. Vith to St. Vith, 199.2 km (123.8 mi)

Stage 4 result
Rank	Rider	Team	Time
1	Greg Van Avermaet (BEL)	BMC Racing Team	4h 57' 44"
2	Tiesj Benoot (BEL)	Lotto–Soudal	+ 0"
3	Egor Silin (RUS)	Team Katusha	+ 10"
4	Dylan Teuns (BEL)	BMC Racing Team	+ 33"
5	Gaëtan Bille (BEL)	Verandas Willems	+ 39"
6	Alexander Foliforov (RUS)	RusVelo	+ 44"
7	Thomas De Gendt (BEL)	Lotto–Soudal	+ 1' 26"
8	Nicolas Vereecken (BEL)	Team3M	+ 1' 26"
9	Vyacheslav Kuznetsov (RUS)	Team Katusha	+ 1' 26"
10	Martin Elmiger (SUI)	IAM Cycling	+ 1' 26"

Final general classification
Rank	Rider	Team	Time
1	Greg Van Avermaet (BEL)	BMC Racing Team	18h 01' 16"
2	Tiesj Benoot (BEL)	Lotto–Soudal	+ 41"
3	Gaëtan Bille (BEL)	Verandas Willems	+ 56"
4	Dylan Teuns (BEL)	BMC Racing Team	+ 1' 28"
5	Martin Elmiger (SWI)	IAM Cycling	+ 1' 49"
6	Mathieu van der Poel (NED)	BKCP–Powerplus	+ 1' 59"
7	Oliver Naesen (BEL)	Topsport Vlaanderen–Baloise	+ 2' 02"
8	Vyacheslav Kuznetsov (RUS)	Team Katusha	+ 2' 13"
9	Huub Duyn (NED)	Team Roompot	+ 2' 15"
10	Frederik Backaert (BEL)	Wanty–Groupe Gobert	+ 2' 17"

== Classification leadership table ==
Stage	Winner	General classification Dutch: Algemeen klassement	Points classification Dutch: Puntenklassement	Combativity classification Dutch: Prijs van de strijdlust	Teams classification Dutch: Ploegenklassement
P	Matthias Brändle	Matthias Brändle	Matthias Brändle	Not awarded	BMC Racing Team
1	Tom Boonen	Matthias Brändle	Tom Boonen	Benjamin Verraes	BMC Racing Team
2	Arnaud Démare	Matthias Brändle	Arnaud Démare	Benjamin Verraes	BMC Racing Team
3	Arnaud Démare	Matthias Brändle	Arnaud Démare	Benjamin Verraes	BMC Racing Team
4	Greg Van Avermaet	Greg Van Avermaet	Tom Boonen	Philipp Walsleben	BMC Racing Team
Final		Greg Van Avermaet	Tom Boonen	Philipp Walsleben	BMC Racing Team
