= 2015 Volta a Portugal =

2015 UCI Europe Tour

Race details
- Dates: July 29 - August 9
- Stages: 10 + Prologue
- Distance: 1,551.7 km (964.2 mi)
- Winning time: 40h 10' 39"

Results
Jersey awarded to the overall winner	Winner	Gustavo Veloso (ESP)	(W52–Quinta da Lixa)
	Second	Joni Brandão (POR)	(Efapel)
	Third	Alejandro Marque (ESP)	(Efapel)
Jersey awarded to the points classification winner	Points	Gustavo Veloso (ESP)	(W52–Quinta da Lixa)
Jersey awarded to the mountains classification winner	Mountains	Bruno Silva (POR)	(LA Alumínios–Antarte)
Jersey awarded to the young rider classification winner	Young rider	Aleksey Rybalkin (RUS)	(Lokosphinx)
	Team	(Portugal) W52–Quinta da Lixa	

The 2015 Volta a Portugal was a men's road bicycle race held from 29 July to 9 August 2015. It is the 77th edition of the men's stage race to be held, which was established in 1927. As part of the 2015 UCI Europe Tour, it is rated as a 2.1 event. Just before the start, the race was marked by controversy due to UCI an regulation amendment restricting the teams to 8 riders (with exception of the 3 big races-Giro, Tour and Vuelta), issue just one month before the Volta. The race director, Joaquim Gomes achieved an exception and the teams raced with 9 riders each. Gustavo Veloso repeated the 2014 success.

== Participating teams ==
In total, 16 teams are set to compete.

- National teams:
  - W52–Quinta da Lixa
  - Rádio Popular–Boavista
  - Efapel
  - LA Alumínios–Antarte
  - Tavira
  - Louletano–Ray Just Energy
- International teams:
  - Caja Rural–Seguros RGA
  - Parkhotel Valkenburg Continental Team
  - Team Idea 2010 ASD
  - Team Ecuador
  - Cyclingteam de Rijke
  - Lokosphinx
  - Team Stuttgart
  - Verandas Willems
  - Team Kuota–Lotto
  - ISD Continental Team

== Schedule ==
Stage	Route	Distance	Date	Type	Winner
P	Viseu > Viseu	6 km	July 29	Individual time trial	Gaetan Bille (BEL)
1	Pinhel > Bragança	196.8 km	July 30	Flat stage	Vicente García de Mateos (ESP)
2	Macedo de Cavaleiros > Montalegre - Serra do Larouco	175.6 km	July 31	Medium-mountain stage	Delio Fernández (ESP)
3	Boticas > Fafe	172.2 km	August 1	Flat stage	Davide Viganò (ITA)
4	Alvarenga (Arouca) > Mondim de Basto (Srª da Graça)	159.4 km	August 2	Mountain stage	Filipe Cardoso (POR)
5	Braga > Viana do Castelo-Monte Santa Luzia	169.4 km	August 3	Medium-mountain stage	José Gonçalves (POR)
6	Ovar > Oliveira de Azeméis	154.1 km	August 4	Flat stage	Gustavo Veloso (ESP)
7	Condeixa-a-Nova > Torre	171.3 km	August 6	Mountain stage	Delio Fernández (ESP)
8	Guarda > Castelo Branco	180.2 km	August 7	Flat stage	Eduard Prades (ESP)
9	Pedrógão Beach > Leiria	34.2 km	August 8	Individual time trial	Gustavo Veloso (ESP)
10	Vila Franca de Xira > Lisbon	132.5 km	August 9	Flat stage	Matteo Malucelli (ITA)

== Classification leadership ==
Stage	Winner	General classification Classificação Geral Individual	Points classification Classificação dos Pontos	Mountains classification Classificação da Montanha	Young rider classification Classificação da Juventude	Team classification Classificação por Equipas
P	Gaetan Bille	Gaetan Bille	not awarded	not awarded	Luca Capelli	Verandas Willems
1	Vicente de Mateos	Gaetan Bille	Vicente de Mateos	Bruno Silva	Hector Benito	W52–Quinta da Lixa
2	Delio Fernández	Gustavo Veloso	José Gonçalves	Bruno Silva	Luca Capelli	W52–Quinta da Lixa
3	Davide Viganò	Gustavo Veloso	Davide Viganò	Bruno Silva	Luca Capelli	W52–Quinta da Lixa
4	Filipe Cardoso	Gustavo Veloso	Filipe Cardoso	Bruno Silva	Aleksey Rybalkin	W52–Quinta da Lixa
5	José Gonçalves	Gustavo Veloso	Gustavo Veloso	Bruno Silva	Aleksey Rybalkin	W52–Quinta da Lixa
6	Gustavo Veloso	Gustavo Veloso	Gustavo Veloso	Bruno Silva	Aleksey Rybalkin	W52–Quinta da Lixa
7	Delio Fernández	Gustavo Veloso	Gustavo Veloso	Bruno Silva	Aleksey Rybalkin	W52–Quinta da Lixa
8	Eduard Prades	Gustavo Veloso	Gustavo Veloso	Bruno Silva	Aleksey Rybalkin	W52–Quinta da Lixa
9	Gustavo Veloso	Gustavo Veloso	Gustavo Veloso	Bruno Silva	Aleksey Rybalkin	W52–Quinta da Lixa
10	Matteo Malucelli	Gustavo Veloso	Gustavo Veloso	Bruno Silva	Aleksey Rybalkin	W52–Quinta da Lixa
Final Classification		Gustavo Veloso	Gustavo Veloso	Bruno Silva	Aleksey Rybalkin	W52–Quinta da Lixa

== Classification standings ==
=== Prologue ===
29 July 2015 — Viseu, 6 km individual time trial (ITT)

Prologue result and general classification

Rank	Rider	Team	Time
1	Gaetan Bille (BEL)	Verandas Willems	7' 22"
2	Gustavo Veloso (ESP)	W52–Quinta da Lixa	+ 3"
3	Dimitri Claeys (BEL)	Verandas Willems	+ 9"
4	Dion Beukboom (NED)	Parkhotel Valkenburg Continental Team	+ 13"
5	José Gonçalves (POR)	Caja Rural–Seguros RGA	+ 16"
6	Coen Vermeltfoort (NED)	Cyclingteam de Rijke	+ 17"
7	Ricardo Vilela (POR)	Caja Rural–Seguros RGA	+ 18"
8	Delio Fernández (ESP)	W52–Quinta da Lixa	+ 18"
9	Eduard Prades (ESP)	Caja Rural–Seguros RGA	+ 19"
10	Hugo Sabido (POR)	Louletano–Ray Just Energy	+ 20"

=== Stage 1 ===
30 July 2015 — Pinhel to Bragança, 196.8 km

Stage 1 result

Rank	Rider	Team	Time
1	Vicente de Mateos (ESP)	Louletano–Ray Just Energy	5h 10' 04"
2	Samuel Caldeira (POR)	W52–Quinta da Lixa	s.t.
3	Davide Viganò (ITA)	Team Idea 2010 ASD	s.t.
4	Filipe Cardoso (POR)	Efapel	s.t.
5	Eduard Prades (ESP)	Caja Rural–Seguros RGA	s.t.
6	Johannes Weber (GER)	Team Stuttgart	s.t.
7	José Gonçalves (POR)	Caja Rural–Seguros RGA	s.t.
8	Daniel Mestre (POR)	Tavira	s.t.
9	Alejandro Marque (ESP)	Efapel	s.t.
10	Jasper Ockeloen (NED)	Parkhotel Valkenburg Continental Team	s.t.

General classification after Stage 1

Rank	Rider	Team	Time
1	Gaetan Bille (BEL)	Verandas Willems	5h 17' 26"
2	Gustavo Veloso (ESP)	W52–Quinta da Lixa	+ 3"
3	Samuel Caldeira (POR)	W52–Quinta da Lixa	+ 15"
4	José Gonçalves (POR)	Caja Rural–Seguros RGA	+ 16"
5	Ricardo Vilela (POR)	Caja Rural–Seguros RGA	+ 18"
6	Delio Fernández (ESP)	W52–Quinta da Lixa	+ 18"
7	Eduard Prades (ESP)	Caja Rural–Seguros RGA	+ 19"
8	Hugo Sabido (POR)	Louletano–Ray Just Energy	+ 20"
9	Vicente de Mateos (ESP)	Louletano–Ray Just Energy	+ 21"
10	Hector Benito (ESP)	Caja Rural–Seguros RGA	+ 22"

=== Stage 2 ===
31 July 2015 — Macedo de Cavaleiros to Montalegre - Serra do Larouco, 175.6 km

Stage 2 result

Rank	Rider	Team	Time
1	Delio Fernández (ESP)	W52–Quinta da Lixa	5h 00' 10"
2	José Gonçalves (POR)	Caja Rural–Seguros RGA	+ 1"
3	Gustavo Veloso (ESP)	W52–Quinta da Lixa	+ 6"
4	Jóni Brandão (POR)	Efapel	s.t.
5	Amaro Antunes (POR)	LA Alumínios–Antarte	+ 8"
6	Alejandro Marque (ESP)	Efapel	s.t.
7	Ricardo Mestre (POR)	Tavira	+ 13"
8	Sérgio Sousa (POR)	LA Alumínios–Antarte	+ 14"
9	Hernâni Broco (POR)	LA Alumínios–Antarte	s.t.
10	Ricardo Vilela (POR)	Caja Rural–Seguros RGA	+ 15"

General classification after Stage 2

Rank	Rider	Team	Time
1	Gustavo Veloso (ESP)	W52–Quinta da Lixa	10h 17' 41"
2	Delio Fernández (ESP)	W52–Quinta da Lixa	+ 3"
3	José Gonçalves (POR)	Caja Rural–Seguros RGA	+ 6"
4	Ricardo Vilela (POR)	Caja Rural–Seguros RGA	+ 28"
5	Amaro Antunes (POR)	LA Alumínios–Antarte	+ 31"
6	Jóni Brandão (POR)	Efapel	s.t.
7	Sérgio Sousa (POR)	LA Alumínios–Antarte	+ 32"
8	Hernâni Broco (POR)	LA Alumínios–Antarte	+ 34"
9	Ricardo Mestre (POR)	Tavira	+ 35"
10	Alejandro Marque (ESP)	Efapel	+ 37"

=== Stage 3 ===
1 August 2015 — Boticas to Fafe, 172.2 km

Stage 3 result

Rank	Rider	Team	Time
1	Davide Viganò (ITA)	Team Idea 2010 ASD	4h 17' 33"
2	Gustavo Veloso (ESP)	W52–Quinta da Lixa	s.t.
3	Manuel Cardoso (POR)	Tavira	s.t.
4	Vicente de Mateos (ESP)	Louletano–Ray Just Energy	s.t.
5	José Gonçalves (POR)	Caja Rural–Seguros RGA	s.t.
6	Alejandro Marque (ESP)	Efapel	s.t.
7	Gaetan Bille (BEL)	Verandas Willems	s.t.
8	Filipe Cardoso (POR)	Efapel	s.t.
9	Amaro Antunes (POR)	LA Alumínios–Antarte	s.t.
10	Jasper Ockeloen (NED)	Parkhotel Valkenburg Continental Team	s.t.

General classification after Stage 3

Rank	Rider	Team	Time
1	Gustavo Veloso (ESP)	W52–Quinta da Lixa	14h 35' 08"
2	Delio Fernández (ESP)	W52–Quinta da Lixa	+ 9"
3	José Gonçalves (POR)	Caja Rural–Seguros RGA	+ 12"
4	Ricardo Vilela (POR)	Caja Rural–Seguros RGA	+ 34"
5	Amaro Antunes (POR)	LA Alumínios–Antarte	+ 37"
6	Jóni Brandão (POR)	Efapel	s.t.
7	Sérgio Sousa (POR)	LA Alumínios–Antarte	+ 38"
8	Hernâni Broco (POR)	LA Alumínios–Antarte	+ 40"
9	Ricardo Mestre (POR)	Tavira	+ 41"
10	Alejandro Marque (ESP)	Efapel	+ 43"

=== Stage 4 ===
2 August 2015 — Alvarenga (Arouca) to Mondim de Basto (Srª da Graça), 159.4 km

Stage 4 result

Rank	Rider	Team	Time
1	Filipe Cardoso (POR)	Efapel	4h 26' 14"
2	Jóni Brandão (POR)	Efapel	s.t.
3	Gustavo Veloso (ESP)	W52–Quinta da Lixa	s.t.
4	Amaro Antunes (POR)	LA Alumínios–Antarte	+ 4"
5	Delio Fernández (ESP)	W52–Quinta da Lixa	s.t.
6	Alejandro Marque (ESP)	Efapel	+ 8"
7	António Carvalho (POR)	W52–Quinta da Lixa	s.t.
8	João Benta (POR)	Louletano–Ray Just Energy	+ 16"
9	Ricardo Vilela (POR)	Caja Rural–Seguros RGA	+ 23"
10	Daniel Silva (POR)	Rádio Popular–Boavista	+ 25"

General classification after Stage 4

Rank	Rider	Team	Time
1	Gustavo Veloso (ESP)	W52–Quinta da Lixa	19h 01' 18"
2	Delio Fernández (ESP)	W52–Quinta da Lixa	+ 17"
3	Jóni Brandão (POR)	Efapel	+ 35"
4	Amaro Antunes (POR)	LA Alumínios–Antarte	+ 45"
5	Alejandro Marque (ESP)	Efapel	+ 55"
6	Ricardo Vilela (POR)	Caja Rural–Seguros RGA	+ 1' 01"
7	António Carvalho (POR)	W52–Quinta da Lixa	+ 1' 09"
8	Hernâni Broco (POR)	LA Alumínios–Antarte	+ 1' 14"
9	João Benta (POR)	Louletano–Ray Just Energy	+ 1' 24"
10	Daniel Silva (POR)	Rádio Popular–Boavista	+ 1' 30"

=== Stage 5 ===
3 August 2015 — Braga to Viana do Castelo, 169.4 km

Stage 5 result

Rank	Rider	Team	Time
1	Jose Gonçalves (POR)	Caja Rural–Seguros RGA	4h 09' 07"
2	Delio Fernández (ESP)	W52–Quinta da Lixa	s.t.
3	Gustavo Veloso (ESP)	W52–Quinta da Lixa	s.t.
4	Jóni Brandão (POR)	Efapel	+ 2"
5	Alejandro Marque (ESP)	Efapel	+ 3"
6	Gaetan Bille (BEL)	Verandas Willems	s.t.
7	Daniel Silva (POR)	Rádio Popular–Boavista	s.t.
8	Cesar Fonte (POR)	Rádio Popular–Boavista	s.t.
9	Ricardo Vilela (POR)	Caja Rural–Seguros RGA	s.t.
10	Amaro Antunes (POR)	LA Alumínios–Antarte	s.t.

General classification after Stage 5

Rank	Rider	Team	Time
1	Gustavo Veloso (ESP)	W52–Quinta da Lixa	23h 10' 21"
2	Delio Fernández (ESP)	W52–Quinta da Lixa	+ 15"
3	Jóni Brandão (POR)	Efapel	+ 41"
4	Amaro Antunes (POR)	LA Alumínios–Antarte	+ 52"
5	Alejandro Marque (ESP)	Efapel	+ 1' 02"
6	Ricardo Vilela (POR)	Caja Rural–Seguros RGA	+ 1' 08"
7	António Carvalho (POR)	W52–Quinta da Lixa	+ 1' 16"
8	Hernâni Broco (POR)	LA Alumínios–Antarte	+ 1' 26"
9	João Benta (POR)	Louletano–Ray Just Energy	+ 1' 36"
10	Daniel Silva (POR)	Rádio Popular–Boavista	+ 1' 37"

=== Stage 6 ===
4 August 2015 — Ovar to Oliveira de Azeméis, 154.1 km

Stage 6 result

Rank	Rider	Team	Time
1	Gustavo Veloso (ESP)	W52–Quinta da Lixa	3h 44' 33"
2	Vicente de Mateos (ESP)	Louletano–Ray Just Energy	s.t.
3	Delio Fernández (ESP)	W52–Quinta da Lixa	s.t.
4	Rafael Silva (POR)	Efapel	s.t.
5	Davide Viganò (ITA)	Team Idea 2010 ASD	s.t.
6	Jóni Brandão (POR)	Efapel	s.t.
7	Manuel Cardoso (POR)	Tavira	s.t.
8	Jasper Ockeloen (NED)	Parkhotel Valkenburg Continental Team	s.t.
9	Cesar Fonte (POR)	Rádio Popular–Boavista	s.t.
10	Gaetan Bille (BEL)	Verandas Willems	s.t.

General classification after Stage 6

Rank	Rider	Team	Time
1	Gustavo Veloso (ESP)	W52–Quinta da Lixa	26h 54' 44"
2	Delio Fernández (ESP)	W52–Quinta da Lixa	+ 21"
3	Jóni Brandão (POR)	Efapel	+ 51"
4	Amaro Antunes (POR)	LA Alumínios–Antarte	+ 1' 02"
5	Alejandro Marque (ESP)	Efapel	+ 1' 12"
6	Ricardo Vilela (POR)	Caja Rural–Seguros RGA	+ 1' 18"
7	António Carvalho (POR)	W52–Quinta da Lixa	+ 1' 26"
8	Hernâni Broco (POR)	LA Alumínios–Antarte	+ 1' 36"
9	João Benta (POR)	Louletano–Ray Just Energy	+ 1' 46"
10	Daniel Silva (POR)	Rádio Popular–Boavista	+ 1' 47"

=== Stage 7 ===
6 August 2015 — Condeixa-a-Nova to Torre, 171.31 km

Stage 7 result

Rank	Rider	Team	Time
1	Delio Fernández (ESP)	W52–Quinta da Lixa	4h 42' 00"
2	Gustavo Veloso (ESP)	W52–Quinta da Lixa	s.t.
3	Jóni Brandão (POR)	Efapel	+ 4"
4	Marcos García (ESP)	Louletano–Ray Just Energy	+ 7"
5	Alejandro Marque (ESP)	Efapel	+ 10"
6	Rui Sousa (POR)	Rádio Popular–Boavista	+ 14"
7	Sérgio Sousa (POR)	LA Alumínios–Antarte	+ 19"
8	António Carvalho (POR)	W52–Quinta da Lixa	s.t.
9	Daniel Silva (POR)	Rádio Popular–Boavista	+ 34"
10	Virgílio Santos (POR)	Rádio Popular–Boavista	+ 48"

General classification after Stage 7

Rank	Rider	Team	Time
1	Gustavo Veloso (ESP)	W52–Quinta da Lixa	31h 36' 38"
2	Delio Fernández (ESP)	W52–Quinta da Lixa	+ 14"
3	Jóni Brandão (POR)	Efapel	+ 57"
4	Alejandro Marque (ESP)	Efapel	+ 1' 28"
5	António Carvalho (POR)	W52–Quinta da Lixa	+ 1' 51"
6	Rui Sousa (POR)	Rádio Popular–Boavista	+ 2' 11"
7	Marcos García (ESP)	Louletano–Ray Just Energy	+ 2' 20"
8	Sérgio Sousa (POR)	LA Alumínios–Antarte	+ 2' 27"
9	Daniel Silva (POR)	Rádio Popular–Boavista	s.t.
10	Hernâni Broco (POR)	LA Alumínios–Antarte	+ 3' 03"

=== Stage 8 ===
7 August 2015 — Guarda to Castelo Branco, 180.2 km

Stage 8 result

Rank	Rider	Team	Time
1	Eduardo Prades (ESP)	Caja Rural–Seguros RGA	4h 09' 44"
2	Samuel Caldeira (POR)	W52–Quinta da Lixa	s.t.
3	Davide Viganò (ITA)	Team Idea 2010 ASD	s.t.
4	Coen Vermeltfoort (NED)	Cyclingteam de Rijke	s.t.
5	Albert Torres (ESP)	Team Ecuador	s.t.
6	Rafael Silva (POR)	Efapel	s.t.
7	Amaro Antunes (POR)	LA Alumínios–Antarte	s.t.
8	Delio Fernández (ESP)	W52–Quinta da Lixa	s.t.
9	Daniel Silva (POR)	Rádio Popular–Boavista	s.t.
10	Vicente de Mateos (ESP)	Louletano–Ray Just Energy	s.t.

General classification after Stage 8

Rank	Rider	Team	Time
1	Gustavo Veloso (ESP)	W52–Quinta da Lixa	35h 46' 22"
2	Delio Fernández (ESP)	W52–Quinta da Lixa	+ 14"
3	Jóni Brandão (POR)	Efapel	+ 57"
4	Alejandro Marque (ESP)	Efapel	+ 1' 28"
5	António Carvalho (POR)	W52–Quinta da Lixa	+ 1' 51"
6	Rui Sousa (POR)	Rádio Popular–Boavista	+ 2' 11"
7	Marcos García (ESP)	Louletano–Ray Just Energy	+ 2' 20"
8	Sérgio Sousa (POR)	LA Alumínios–Antarte	+ 2' 27"
9	Daniel Silva (POR)	Rádio Popular–Boavista	s.t.
10	Hernâni Broco (POR)	LA Alumínios–Antarte	+ 3' 03"

=== Stage 9 ===
8 August 2015 — ITT Pedrógão Beach to Leiria, 34.2 km

Stage 9 result

Rank	Rider	Team	Time
1	Gustavo Veloso (ESP)	W52–Quinta da Lixa	40' 41"
2	José Gonçalves (POR)	Caja Rural–Seguros RGA	+ 26"
3	Rafael Reis (POR)	Tavira	+ 35"
4	Ricardo Mestre (ESP)	Tavira	+ 50"
5	Rui Sousa (POR)	Rádio Popular–Boavista	+ 56"
6	Evgeny Shalunov (RUS)	Lokosphinx	+ 57"
7	Alejandro Marque (ESP)	Efapel	+ 1' 00"
8	Gaetan Bille (BEL)	Verandas Willems	+ 1' 03"
9	Albert Torres (ESP)	Team Ecuador	+ 1' 10"
10	Daniel Westmattelmann (GER)	Team Kuota–Lotto	+ 1' 21"

General classification after Stage 9

Rank	Rider	Team	Time
1	Gustavo Veloso (ESP)	W52–Quinta da Lixa	36h 27' 03"
2	Jóni Brandão (POR)	Efapel	+ 2'12"
3	Alejandro Marque (ESP)	Efapel	+ 2' 19"
4	Delio Fernández (ESP)	W52–Quinta da Lixa	+ 2' 57"
5	Rui Sousa (POR)	Rádio Popular–Boavista	+ 2'58"
6	António Carvalho (POR)	W52–Quinta da Lixa	+ 3' 20"
7	Sérgio Sousa (POR)	LA Alumínios–Antarte	+ 3'45"
8	Daniel Silva (POR)	Rádio Popular–Boavista	+ 4 '32"
9	Hernâni Brôco (POR)	LA Alumínios–Antarte	+ 4' 33"
10	Amaro Antunes (POR)	LA Alumínios–Antarte	+ 5' 27"

=== Stage 10 ===
9 August 2015 — Vila Franca de Xira to Lisbon, 132.5 km

Stage 10 result

Rank	Rider	Team	Time
1	Matteo Malucelli (ITA)	Team Idea 2010 ASD	3h 33' 27"
2	Davide Viganò (ITA)	Team Idea 2010 ASD	s.t.
3	Eduard Prades (ESP)	Caja Rural–Seguros RGA	s.t.
4	Manuel Cardoso (POR)	Tavira	s.t.
5	Pedro Paulinho (POR)	LA Alumínios–Antarte	s.t.
6	Filipe Cardoso (POR)	Efapel	s.t.
7	Albert Torres (ESP)	Team Ecuador	s.t.
8	Vicente de Mateos (ESP)	Louletano–Ray Just Energy	s.t.
9	Samuel Caldeira (POR)	W52–Quinta da Lixa	s.t.
10	Marco Tizza (ITA)	Team Idea 2010 ASD	s.t.

Final General classification

Rank	Rider	Team	Time
1	Gustavo Veloso (ESP)	W52–Quinta da Lixa	36h 27' 03"
2	Jóni Brandão (POR)	Efapel	+ 2'12"
3	Alejandro Marque (ESP)	Efapel	+ 2' 19"
4	Delio Fernández (ESP)	W52–Quinta da Lixa	+ 2' 57"
5	Rui Sousa (POR)	Rádio Popular–Boavista	+ 2'58"
6	António Carvalho (POR)	W52–Quinta da Lixa	+ 3' 20"
7	Sérgio Sousa (POR)	LA Alumínios–Antarte	+ 3'45"
8	Daniel Silva (POR)	Rádio Popular–Boavista	+ 4 '32"
9	Hernâni Brôco (POR)	LA Alumínios–Antarte	+ 4' 33"
10	Amaro Antunes (POR)	LA Alumínios–Antarte	+ 5' 27"

== Final standings ==
General classification
Pos	Rider	Team	Time
1	Gustavo Veloso (ESP)	W52–Quinta da Lixa	40h 10' 39"
2	Jóni Brandão (POR)	Efapel	+ 2'12"
3	Alejandro Marque (ESP)	Efapel	+ 2' 19"
4	Delio Fernández (ESP)	W52–Quinta da Lixa	+ 2' 57"
5	Rui Sousa (POR)	Rádio Popular–Boavista	+ 2'58"
6	António Carvalho (POR)	W52–Quinta da Lixa	+ 3' 20"
7	Sérgio Sousa (POR)	LA Alumínios–Antarte	+ 3'45"
8	Daniel Silva (POR)	Rádio Popular–Boavista	+ 4 '32"
9	Hernâni Brôco (POR)	LA Alumínios–Antarte	+ 4' 33"
10	Amaro Antunes (POR)	LA Alumínios–Antarte	+ 5' 27"

Points classification
Pos	Rider	Team	Points
1	Gustavo Veloso (ESP)	W52–Quinta da Lixa	118
2	Delio Fernández (ESP)	W52–Quinta da Lixa	103
3	Davide Viganò (ITA)	Team Idea 2010 ASD	93

Mountains classification
Pos	Rider	Team	Points
1	Bruno Silva (POR)	LA Alumínios–Antarte	80
2	Delio Fernández (ESP)	W52–Quinta da Lixa	50
3	Gustavo Veloso (ESP)	W52–Quinta da Lixa	44

Youth classification
Pos	Rider	Team	Time
1	Aleksey Rybalkin (RUS)	Lokosphinx	40h 12' 01"
2	Anatoliy Budyak (UKR)	ISD Continental Team	+ 14' 13"
3	Evgeny Shalunov (RUS)	Lokosphinx	+15' 03"

Teams classification
Pos	Team	Time
1	W52–Quinta da Lixa	120h 07' 56"
2	Rádio Popular–Boavista	+ 6' 29s
3	LA Alumínios–Antarte	+ 7' 36s
