= Jordi Simón (cyclist) =

Spanish cyclist

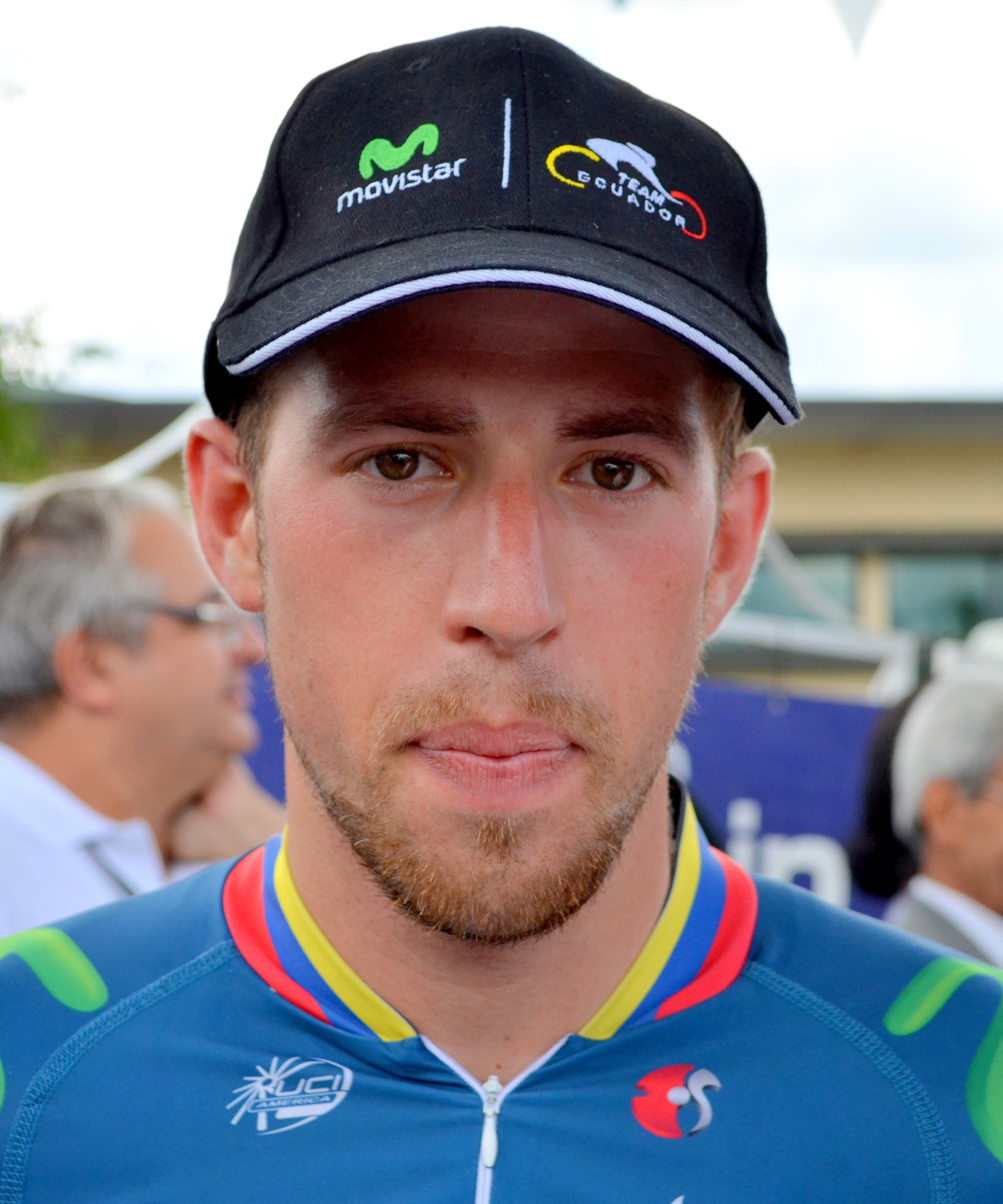
- Simón in 2014

Personal information
- Full name: Jordi Simón Cadulleras
- Born: 6 September 1990 (age 36) Navàs, Catalonia, Spain

Cycling career
- Sport: Cycling
- Discipline: Road
- Role: Rider

Amateur teams
- 2010–2011: Caja Rural Amateur
- 2013: Coluer Bicycles

Professional teams
- 2011: Caja Rural (stagiaire)
- 2012: Andalucía
- 2014–2015: Team Ecuador
- 2016: Verva ActiveJet
- 2017: Soul Brasil Pro Cycling
- 2018: Burgos BH

Jordi Simón (born 6 September 1990) is a Spanish racing cyclist, who last rode for UCI Professional Continental team Burgos BH. He rode at the 2014 UCI Road World Championships. In August 2018, he was named in the startlist for the Vuelta a España.

== Major results ==
2008
2nd Road race, National Junior Road Championships
2011
5th Overall Vuelta a la Comunidad de Madrid U23

1st Stage 1

7th Road race, UEC European Under-23 Road Championships
9th Overall Tour de l'Avenir
10th Gran Premio della Liberazione
2013
1st Overall Vuelta Ciclista a León

1st Stage 1

2014
Tour des Pays de Savoie

1st Mountains classification
1st Stages 2 & 3

1st Mountains classification Tour de l'Ain
1st Points classification Troféu Joaquim Agostinho
7th Prueba Villafranca de Ordizia
2015
1st Overall GP Internacional do Guadiana

1st Mountains classification
1st Stage 1

6th Overall Istrian Spring Trophy
2016
3rd Road race, National Road Championships
2018
Combativity award Stage 2 Vuelta a España

=== Grand Tour general classification results timeline ===
Grand Tour	2018
Giro d'Italia	—
Tour de France	—
Vuelta a España	DNF

Legend
—	Did not compete
DNF	Did not finish
