= Olivier Pardini =

Belgian road cyclist (born 1985)

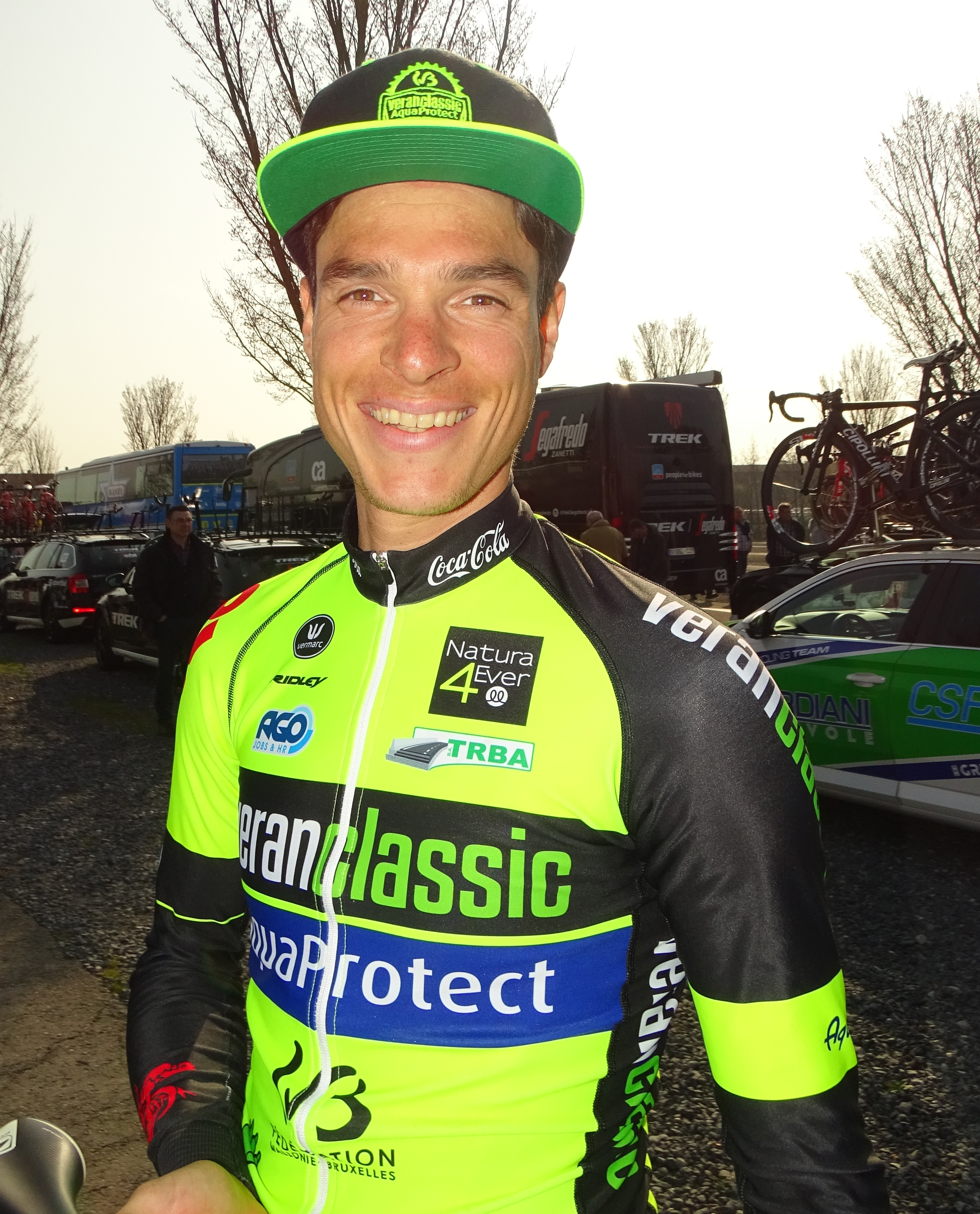
- Pardini in 2017

Personal information
- Full name: Olivier Pardini
- Born: 30 July 1985 (age 41) Oupeye, Belgium
- Height: 1.80 m (5 ft 11 in)
- Weight: 68 kg (150 lb)

Cycling career
- Sport: Cycling
- Current team: Retired
- Discipline: Road
- Role: Rider

Amateur team
- 2007: Storez–Ledecq Matériaux

Professional teams
- 2008: Groupe Gobert.com
- 2009–2010: Verandas Willems
- 2011: Wallonie Bruxelles–Crédit Agricole
- 2012: Colba–Superano Ham
- 2013–2015: Verandas Willems
- 2016–2017: Wallonie-Bruxelles–Group Protect
- 2018: Differdange–Losch

Olivier Pardini (born 30 July 1985) is a Belgian former professional cyclist, who competed professionally between 2008 and 2018 for the Groupe Gobert.com, Verandas Willems, Wallonie Bruxelles–Crédit Agricole/WB Veranclassic Aqua Protect, Colba–Superano Ham, Verandas Willems and Differdange–Losch teams.

== Major results ==
2005
5th Internationale Wielertrofee Jong Maar Moedig
2006
5th Memorial Van Coningsloo
7th Flèche Hesbignonne
2007
5th Overall Le Triptyque des Monts et Châteaux
6th Overall Tour du Haut-Anjou
9th Classic Loire Atlantique
2008
4th Kattekoers
4th La Roue Tourangelle
4th Internationale Wielertrofee Jong Maar Moedig
8th Overall Le Triptyque des Monts et Châteaux
2009
4th La Roue Tourangelle
2010
2nd Memorial Van Coningsloo
2011
3rd Omloop Het Nieuwsblad Beloften
4th De Vlaamse Pijl
7th Memorial Van Coningsloo
7th Flèche Ardennaise
8th Zellik–Galmaarden
10th Grote Prijs Stad Geel
2012
9th La Roue Tourangelle
2013
2nd Grand Prix de la Ville de Lillers
7th Overall Ronde de l'Oise
10th Gooikse Pijl
2014
1st Prologue Sibiu Cycling Tour
2nd Grand Prix de la ville de Pérenchies
6th Memorial Van Coningsloo
8th Overall Tour de Normandie
2015
1st Overall Ronde van Midden-Nederland

1st Stage 1 (TTT)

2nd Duo Normand (with Dimitri Claeys)
3rd Overall Paris–Arras Tour

1st Stage 1 (TTT)

5th Overall Tour de l'Eurométropole
8th Overall Tour de Normandie
8th Binche–Chimay–Binche
9th Chrono des Nations
10th Grand Prix Impanis-Van Petegem
2016
1st Overall Istrian Spring Trophy
1st Overall Circuit des Ardennes

1st Stage 3

2nd Overall Tour de Normandie

1st Stage 2

2nd La Roue Tourangelle
3rd Classic Sud-Ardèche
4th Overall Driedaagse van West-Vlaanderen
6th Tour du Finistère
8th Volta Limburg Classic
2017
3rd Grote Prijs Marcel Kint
4th Dwars door het Hageland
7th Bruges Cycling Classic
8th Grote Prijs Stad Zottegem
2018
2nd Internationale Wielertrofee Jong Maar Moedig
5th Paris–Mantes-en-Yvelines
9th Paris–Troyes
