= Stef Van Zummeren =

Belgian cyclist

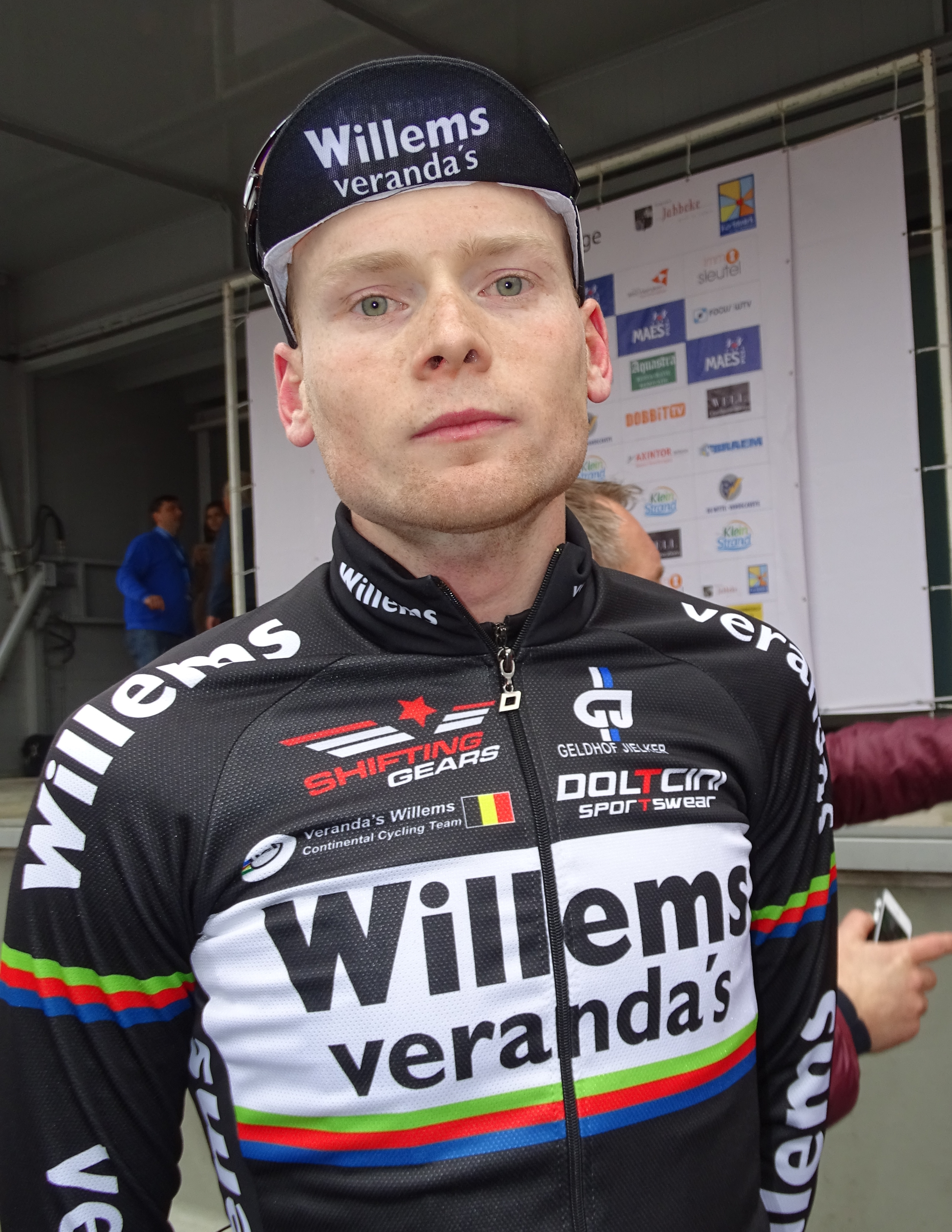
- Van Zummeren in 2015.

Personal information
- Born: 20 December 1991 (age 34) Turnhout, Belgium
- Height: 1.88 m (6 ft 2 in)
- Weight: 73 kg (161 lb)

Cycling career
- Sport: Cycling
- Current team: Retired
- Discipline: Road
- Role: Rider

Amateur teams
- 2012–2013: Lotto–Belisol U23
- 2013: Team3M (stagiaire)

Professional teams
- 2014: Team3M
- 2015–2017: Verandas Willems

Stef Van Zummeren (born 20 December 1991 in Turnhout) is a Belgian former professional cyclist.

== Major results ==
2013
2nd Antwerpse Havenpijl
2014
1st Mountains classification Tour de Normandie
2015
1st Circuit de Wallonie
2nd Handzame Challenge
5th Overall Paris–Arras Tour

1st Stage 1 (TTT)

8th Overall Circuit des Ardennes
8th Duo Normand (with Kai Reus)
9th Grote Prijs Stad Zottegem
