= Vérandas Willems–Crelan =

Belgian cycling team

Verandas Willems Cycling Team
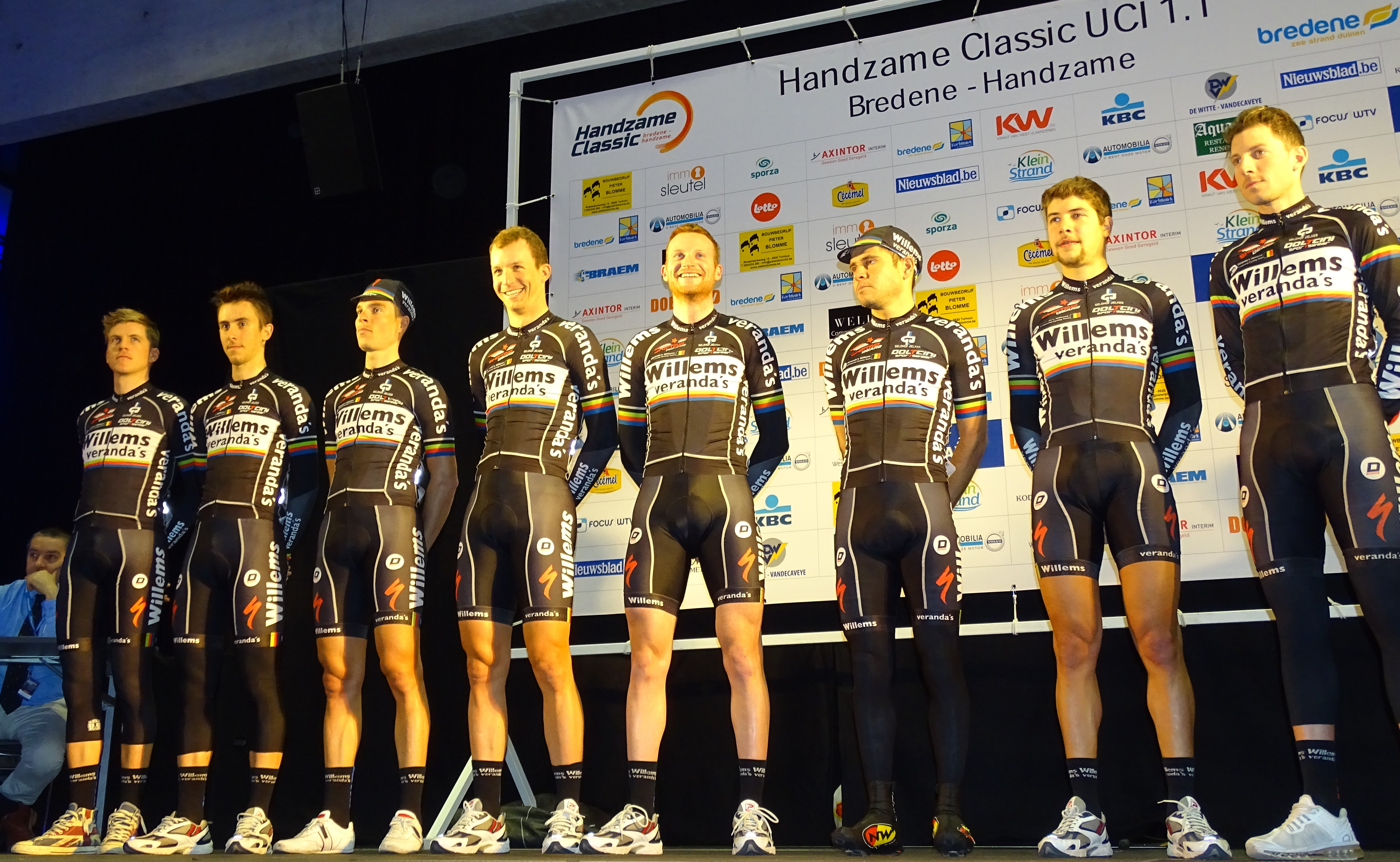
- The team in 2015

Team information
- Registered: Belgium
- Founded: 2013
- Disbanded: 2018; Merged with Roompot–Nederlandse Loterij, forming Roompot–Charles.
- Discipline: Road
- Status: UCI Continental (2013–2016); UCI Professional Continental (2017–2018)

Key personnel
- General manager: Nick Nuyens

Team name history
- 2013–2016 2017–2018: Vérandas Willems; Vérandas Willems–Crelan
Vérandas Willems–Crelan jersey
Jersey

Vérandas Willems–Crelan was a UCI Professional Continental team founded in 2013 and based in Belgium. During the winter the team is active in cyclo-cross. Former team member Michael Goolaerts died following a cardiac arrest at the 2018 Paris–Roubaix in France. In August 2018 it was announced that the team would merge with Roompot–Nederlandse Loterij for the 2019 season under the name Roompot-Crelan.

== 2018 Team roster ==
Rider	Date of birth
Sean De Bie (BEL)	3 October 1991 (aged 27)
Dries De Bondt (BEL)	4 July 1991 (aged 27)
Mathias De Witte (BEL)	29 March 1993 (aged 25)
Stijn Devolder (BEL)	29 August 1979 (aged 39)
Huub Duijn (NED)	1 September 1984 (aged 34)
Stan Godrie (NED)	9 January 1993 (aged 25)
Jappe Jaspers (BEL)	1 September 1998 (aged 20)
Aidis Kruopis (LTU)	26 October 1986 (aged 32)

Rider	Date of birth
Senne Leysen (BEL)	18 March 1996 (aged 22)
Arjen Livyns (BEL)	1 September 1994 (aged 24)
Tim Merlier (BEL)	1 September 1994 (aged 24)
Stijn Steels (BEL)	21 August 1989 (aged 29)
David Tanner (AUS)	30 September 1984 (aged 34)
Wout van Aert (BEL)	15 September 1994 (aged 24)
Elias Van Breussegem (BEL)	10 April 1992 (aged 26)
Zico Waeytens (BEL)	29 September 1991 (aged 27)

== Major wins ==
2014
Overall Flèche du Sud, Gaëtan Bille

Stage 2, Gaëtan Bille

Prologue Sibiu Cycling Tour, Olivier Pardini
Grand Prix de la ville de Pérenchies, Gaëtan Bille

2015
Overall Tour de Normandie, Dimitri Claeys

Stage 2, Dimitri Claeys

Stage 4 Tour of Croatia, Dimitri Claeys
Stage 1 Flèche du Sud, Gaëtan Bille
Overall Paris–Arras Tour, Joeri Calleeuw

Stage 1, Team time trial

Circuit de Wallonie, Stef Van Zummeren
Internationale Wielertrofee Jong Maar Moedig, Dimitri Claeys
Grand Prix de la ville de Pérenchies, Dimitri Claeys
Prologue Volta a Portugal, Gaëtan Bille
Giro del Friuli-Venezia Giulia, Gaëtan Bille
Overall Ronde van Midden-Nederland, Olivier Pardini

Stage 1, Team time trial

2016
Stage 2 Driedaagse van West-Vlaanderen, Timothy Dupont
Dorpenomloop Rucphen, Aidis Kruopis
Nokere Koerse, Timothy Dupont
Stages 1, 3 & 6 Tour de Normandie, Timothy Dupont
Dwars door de Vlaamse Ardennen, Timothy Dupont
Ronde van Overijssel, Aidis Kruopis
Grand Prix Criquielion, Timothy Dupont
Overall Paris–Arras Tour, Aidis Kruopis

Stages 1 & 2, Aidis Kruopis

Memorial Van Coningsloo, Timothy Dupont
Stage 2 Ronde de l'Oise, Dries De Bondt

2017
Ronde van Limburg, Wout van Aert
Bruges Cycling Classic, Wout van Aert
Grand Prix Pino Cerami, Wout van Aert
Rad am Ring, Huub Duyn

2018
Stage 4 Étoile de Bessèges, Sean De Bie
Overall Danmark Rundt, Wout van Aert

Stage 2, Wout van Aert
Stages 3 & 5, Tim Merlier
