= Davide Viganò =

Italian road bicycle racer

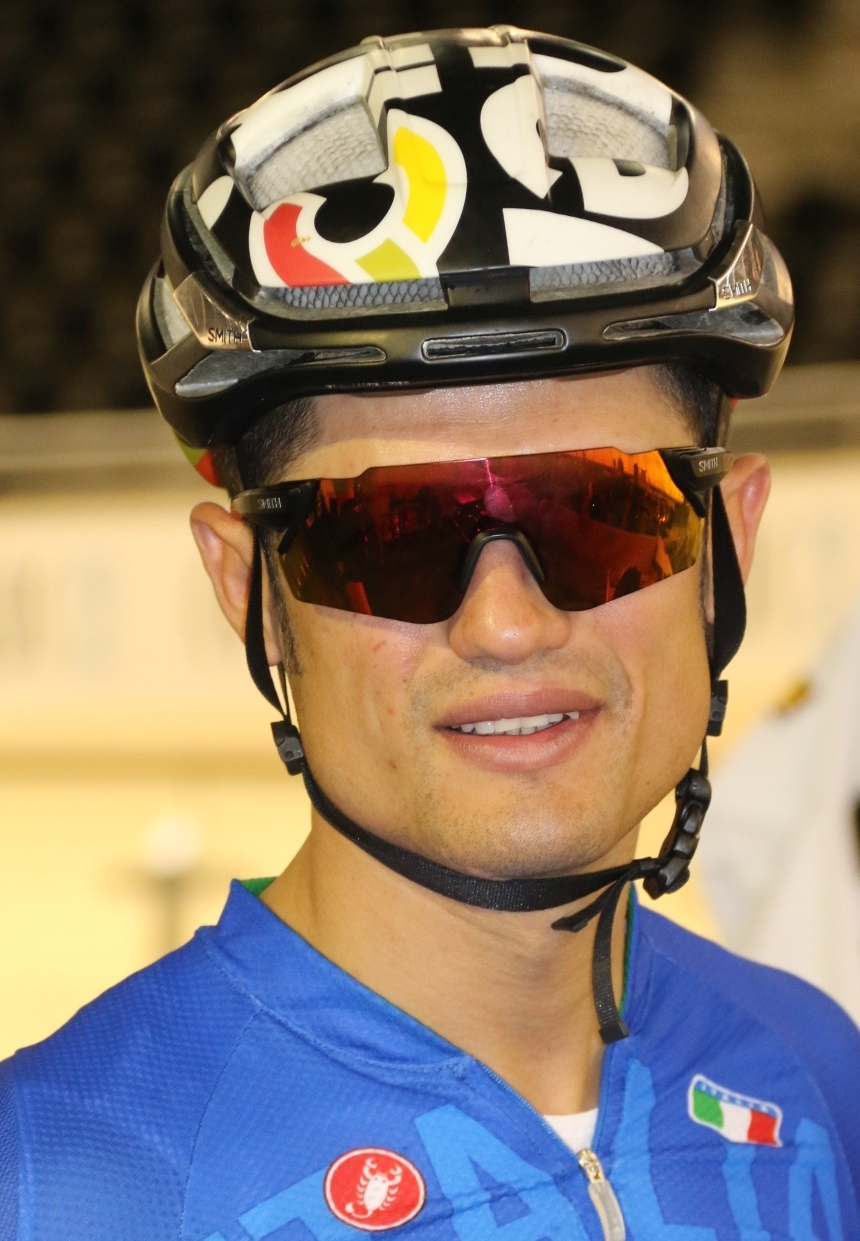
- Viganò in 2017

Personal information
- Full name: Davide Viganò
- Born: 12 June 1984 (age 42) Carate Brianza, Italy

Cycling career
- Sport: Cycling
- Disciplines: Road; Track
- Role: Rider

Amateur team
- 2018: Cycling Team Friuli

Professional teams
- 2005–2008: Quick-Step–Innergetic
- 2009: Fuji–Servetto
- 2010: Team Sky
- 2011: Leopard Trek
- 2012–2013: Lampre–ISD
- 2014: Caja Rural–Seguros RGA
- 2015: Team Idea 2010 ASD
- 2016: Androni Giocattoli–Sidermec
Medal record
Representing Italy
Men's track cycling
European Championships
Gold medal – first place	2012 Montichiari	Derny
Silver medal – second place	2015 Hannover	Derny
European Junior Championships
Bronze medal – third place	2001 Fiorenzuola	Team pursuit

Davide Viganò (born 12 June 1984 in Carate Brianza) is an Italian road bicycle racer, who most recently competed for Italian amateur team, Cycling Team Friuli. He previously rode for the Quick-Step, Fuji–Servetto, Team Sky, Leopard Trek, Lampre–Merida, Caja Rural–Seguros RGA, Team Idea 2010 ASD, and Androni Giocattoli–Sidermec teams.

== Major results ==
2001
3rd Team pursuit, UEC European Junior Track Championships
2004
3rd Trofeo Gianfranco Bianchin
9th Gran Premio della Liberazione
2005
3rd Criterium dei Campioni
2007
1st Stage 1 (TTT) Tour of Qatar
3rd Dutch Food Valley Classic
2008
4th Gran Premio Bruno Beghelli
5th Giro del Piemonte
6th Profronde van Fryslan
2009
6th Vattenfall Cyclassics
2011
1st Stage 1 (TTT) Vuelta a España
4th Binche–Tournai–Binche
2013
1st Mountains classification Tour of Japan
2014
Volta a Portugal

1st Points classification
1st Stage 2

3rd Clásica de Almería
4th Coppa Bernocchi
5th Memorial Marco Pantani
6th Gran Premio Industria e Commercio di Prato
7th Coppa Sabatini
9th Trofeo Palma
10th Gran Premio Bruno Beghelli
2015
1st Overall Okolo Slovenska

1st Points classification
1st Stage 3

1st Stage 3 Volta a Portugal
2nd Gran Premio della Costa Etruschi
3rd Trofeo Matteotti
2016
Sibiu Cycling Tour

1st Points classification
1st Stage 4

3rd Trofeo Matteotti
6th Coppa Bernocchi

=== Grand Tour general classification results timeline ===
Grand Tour	2006	2007	2008	2009	2010	2011	2012
Giro d'Italia	—	—	—	156	—	DNF	—
Tour de France	—	—	—	—	—	—	DNF
Vuelta a España	117	130	93	DNF	—	142	141

Legend
—	Did not compete
DNF	Did not finish
