= Team Idea 2010 ASD =

Italian cycling team

Team information
- Registered: Italy
- Founded: 2010
- Disbanded: 2015
- Discipline: Road
- Status: UCI Continental

Team name history
- 2010–2014 2015: Team Idea; Team Idea 2010 ASD

Team Idea 2010 ASD was a UCI Continental team founded in 2010 and based in Italy. It participated in UCI Continental Circuits races. The team disbanded at the end of the 2015 season.

== Doping ==
In July 2015 Francesco Reda, tested positive for EPO in an anti-doping control that was taken at the Italian Road Championships held on June 27. In February 2016, Reda was banned for eight years.

== Team roster ==
As of 28 March 2015.

Rider	Date of birth
Luca Cappelli (ITA)	14 April 1993 (age 33)
Maurizio Damiano (ITA)	17 March 1992 (age 34)
Marc Christian Garby (DEN)	2 June 1991 (age 35)
Matteo Malucelli (ITA)	20 October 1993 (age 32)
Alessandro Mariani (ITA)	1 May 1996 (age 30)
Giacomo Peretto (ITA)	27 January 1996 (age 30)
Alessandro Pettiti (ITA)	1 April 1990 (age 36)

Rider	Date of birth
Francesco Reda (ITA)	18 November 1982 (age 43)
Matteo Spreafico (ITA)	15 February 1993 (age 33)
Marco Tizza (ITA)	6 February 1992 (age 34)
Manuel Todaro (ITA)	1 July 1996 (age 30)
Mirko Torta (ITA)	11 March 1995 (age 31)
Davide Viganò (ITA)	12 June 1984 (age 42)

== Major wins ==
2012
Stage 1 Settimana Internazionale di Coppi e Bartali, Andrea Palini
Giro del Medio Brenta, Matteo Busato
2014
GP Izola, Christian Delle Stelle
Trofeo Franco Balestra, Christian Delle Stelle
Stage 8 Rás Tailteann, Davide Ballerini
Stage 2 Giro della Regione Friuli, Ricardo Pichetta
2015
Trofeo Edil C, Francesco Reda
Stage 1 Rás Tailteann, Francesco Reda
Stage 3 Rás Tailteann, Matteo Malucelli
Overall Okolo Slovenska, Davide Viganò

Stage 3, Davide Viganò

Stage 3 Volta a Portugal, Davide Viganò
Stage 10 Volta a Portugal, Matteo Malucelli
