= Gaëtan Bille =

Belgian cyclist (born 1988)

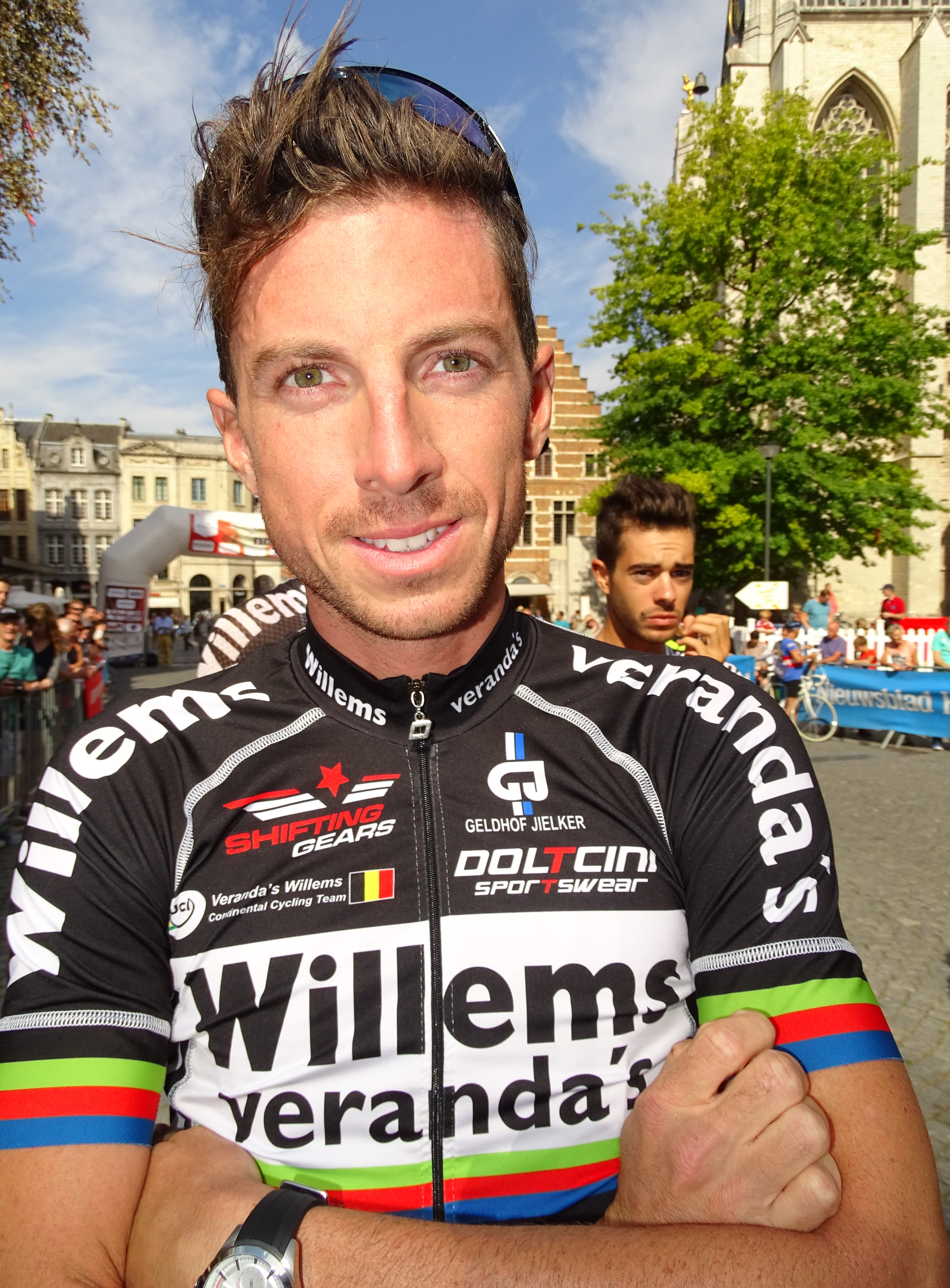
- Bille at the 2015 Grote Prijs Jef Scherens

Personal information
- Full name: Gaëtan Bille
- Born: 6 April 1988 (age 38) Soest, West Germany
- Height: 1.82 m (6 ft 0 in)
- Weight: 67 kg (148 lb)

Cycling career
- Sport: Cycling
- Current team: Retired
- Discipline: Road
- Role: Rider

Amateur teams
- 2008: F.C. Wallonie Espoirs
- 2008: Groupe Gobert.com.ct (stagiaire)
- 2010: Pesant CL
- 2019: Uni Sport Lamentinois

Professional teams
- 2009: Verandas Willems
- 2011: Wallonie Bruxelles–Crédit Agricole
- 2012–2013: Lotto–Belisol
- 2014–2015: Verandas Willems
- 2016: Wanty–Groupe Gobert
- 2017: Vérandas Willems–Crelan
- 2018: Sovac–Natura4Ever

Major wins
- Grand Prix Pino Cerami (2012)

Gaëtan Bille (born 6 April 1988 in Soest) is a German-born Belgian former professional road bicycle racer, who rode professionally between 2009 and 2018.

Bille left Lotto–Belisol at the end of the 2013 season, and joined Verandas Willems for the 2014 season. In September 2015 it was announced that Bille would join Wanty–Groupe Gobert for 2016, with a focus on competing in the one-day classics and one-week stage races.

== Major results ==
2006
9th Overall Giro della Lunigiana
2008
3rd Kattekoers
2010
6th Overall Carpathia Couriers Paths
2011
1st Zellik–Galmaarden
1st Stage 3 Ronde de l'Oise
4th Overall Rhône-Alpes Isère Tour

1st Stage 2

4th Flèche Ardennaise
6th Kattekoers
2012
1st Grand Prix Pino Cerami
9th Binche–Tournai–Binche
2013
3rd Overall La Tropicale Amissa Bongo
5th Overall Tour of Norway
8th Grote Prijs Jef Scherens
2014
1st Overall Flèche du Sud

1st Stage 3

1st Grand Prix de la ville de Pérenchies
2nd Kattekoers
3rd Grand Prix de Templeuve
5th Tour du Jura
6th Paris–Mantes-en-Yvelines
7th Flèche Ardennaise
10th Grand Prix de Wallonie
2015
1st Overall Giro del Friuli-Venezia Giulia

1st Points classification

1st Prologue Volta a Portugal
2nd Overall Paris–Arras Tour

1st Stage 1 (TTT)

2nd Overall Ronde van Midden-Nederland

1st Stage 1 (TTT)

2nd Flèche Ardennaise
3rd Overall Flèche du Sud

1st Stage 1

3rd Overall Tour of Belgium
4th Road race, National Road Championships
4th Circuit de Wallonie
4th Grand Prix de Wallonie
6th Grote Prijs Jef Scherens
6th Binche–Chimay–Binche
7th Druivenkoers Overijse
8th Grand Prix de la ville de Pérenchies
9th Overall Circuit des Ardennes
2016
5th Overall Circuit de la Sarthe
9th Overall Tour de Luxembourg
9th Grand Prix La Marseillaise
9th Grand Prix of Aargau Canton
2018
1st Overall Tour de la Pharmacie Centrale

1st Stage 2

3rd Overall Grand Prix International de la ville d'Alger

1st Prologue

8th Grand Prix de la Pharmacie Centrale
2019
1st Stage 8b (ITT) Tour de Guadeloupe
