= 2014 Tour of Norway =

2014 UCI Europe Tour

Race details
- Dates: 21–25 May 2014
- Stages: 5
- Distance: 879 km (546 mi)
- Winning time: 21h 14' 56"

Results
Jersey awarded to the overall winner	Winner	Maciej Paterski (POL)	(CCC–Polsat–Polkowice)
	Second	Marc de Maar (CUR)	(UnitedHealthcare)
	Third	Bauke Mollema (NED)	(Belkin Pro Cycling)
Jersey awarded to the points classification winner	Points	Alexander Kristoff (NOR)	(Team Katusha)
Jersey awarded to the mountains classification winner	Mountains	Amund Grøndahl (NOR)	(Team Sparebanken Sør)
Jersey awarded to the young rider classification winner	Young rider	Jesper Hansen (DEN)	(Tinkoff–Saxo)

The 2014 Tour of Norway was the fourth edition of the Tour of Norway cycle race. It was a part of the 2014 UCI Europe Tour.

== Schedule ==
There were 5 stages in the race.

Stage	Date	Course	Distance	Type	Winner	Winning team
1	21 May	Larvik to Larvik	147.7 km (91.8 mi)	Intermediate stage	Alexander Kristoff (NOR)	Team Katusha
2	22 May	Drøbak to Sarpsborg	191.6 km (119.1 mi)	Flat stage	Marc de Maar (CUR)	UnitedHealthcare
3	23 May	Årnes to Budor	177.7 km (110.4 mi)	Intermediate stage	Sep Vanmarcke (BEL)	Belkin Pro Cycling
4	24 May	Brumunddal to Lillehammer	195 km (121.2 mi)	Intermediate stage	Bauke Mollema (NED)	Belkin Pro Cycling
5	25 May	Gjøvik to Hønefoss (Eggemoen)	167 km (103.8 mi)	Flat stage	Alexander Kristoff (NOR)	Team Katusha

== Teams ==
There were 18 teams that competed in the race. With the exception of MTN–Qhubeka (with five riders), each team entered six riders for the race.

UCI ProTeams
- (Netherlands) Belkin Pro Cycling
- (Russia) Team Katusha
- (Russia) Tinkoff–Saxo
UCI Professional Continental Teams
- (Spain) Caja Rural–Seguros RGA
- (Poland) CCC–Polsat–Polkowice
- (Switzerland) IAM Cycling
- (South Africa) MTN–Qhubeka
- (Russia) RusVelo
- (Belgium) Topsport Vlaanderen–Baloise
- (United States) UnitedHealthcare
- (Belgium) Wanty–Groupe Gobert
UCI Continental Teams
- (Norway) Team Joker
- (Norway) Team Øster Hus-Ridley
- (Norway) Team Sparebanken Sør
- (Norway) Frøy-Bianchi
- (Norway) Motiv3 Pro-Cycling Team
- (Norway) Team FixIT.no
- (Norway) Team Ringeriks-Kraft

== Stages ==
=== Stage 1 ===
21 May 2014 — Larvik to Larvik, 147.7 km (91.8 mi)

Stage 1 Result

	Rider	Team	Time
1	Alexander Kristoff (NOR)	Team Katusha	3h 24' 18"
2	Sondre Holst Enger (NOR)	Team Sparebanken Sør	s.t.
3	Tom Van Asbroeck (BEL)	Topsport Vlaanderen–Baloise	s.t.
4	Lars Petter Nordhaug (NOR)	Belkin Pro Cycling	s.t.
5	Zico Waeytens (BEL)	Topsport Vlaanderen–Baloise	s.t.
6	Bartłomiej Matysiak (POL)	CCC–Polsat–Polkowice	s.t.
7	Gerald Ciolek (GER)	MTN–Qhubeka	s.t.
8	Thomas Sprengers (BEL)	Topsport Vlaanderen–Baloise	s.t.
9	Maciej Paterski (POL)	CCC–Polsat–Polkowice	s.t.
10	Jo Kogstad Ringheim (NOR)	Team Joker	s.t.

General Classification after Stage 1

	Rider	Team	Time
1	Alexander Kristoff (NOR)	Team Katusha	3h 24' 08"
2	Sondre Holst Enger (NOR)	Team Sparebanken Sør	+ 4"
3	Tom Van Asbroeck (BEL)	Topsport Vlaanderen–Baloise	+ 6"
4	Lars Petter Nordhaug (NOR)	Belkin Pro Cycling	+ 10"
5	Zico Waeytens (BEL)	Topsport Vlaanderen–Baloise	+ 10"
6	Bartłomiej Matysiak (POL)	CCC–Polsat–Polkowice	+ 10"
7	Gerald Ciolek (GER)	MTN–Qhubeka	+ 10"
8	Thomas Sprengers (BEL)	Topsport Vlaanderen–Baloise	+ 10"
9	Maciej Paterski (POL)	CCC–Polsat–Polkowice	+ 10"
10	Jo Kogstad Ringheim (NOR)	Team Joker	+ 10"

=== Stage 2 ===
22 May 2014 — Drøbak to Sarpsborg, 191.6 km (119.1 mi)

Stage 2 Result

	Rider	Team	Time
1	Marc de Maar (CUR)	UnitedHealthcare	4h 38' 38"
2	Maciej Paterski (POL)	CCC–Polsat–Polkowice	s.t.
3	Alexander Kristoff (NOR)	Team Katusha	+ 12"
4	Aleksejs Saramotins (LAT)	IAM Cycling	+ 12"
5	Sondre Holst Enger (NOR)	Team Sparebanken Sør	+ 12"
6	Marko Kump (SLO)	Tinkoff–Saxo	+ 12"
7	Sven Erik Bystrøm (NOR)	Team Øster Hus-Ridley	+ 12"
8	Sébastien Hinault (FRA)	IAM Cycling	+ 12"
9	Tom Van Asbroeck (BEL)	Topsport Vlaanderen–Baloise	+ 12"
10	Lars Petter Nordhaug (NOR)	Belkin Pro Cycling	+ 12"

General Classification after Stage 2

	Rider	Team	Time
1	Marc de Maar (CUR)	UnitedHealthcare	8h 02' 44"
2	Maciej Paterski (POL)	CCC–Polsat–Polkowice	+ 3"
3	Alexander Kristoff (NOR)	Team Katusha	+ 10"
4	Tom Van Asbroeck (BEL)	Topsport Vlaanderen–Baloise	+ 17"
5	Sondre Holst Enger (NOR)	Team Sparebanken Sør	+ 18"
6	Bauke Mollema (NED)	Belkin Pro Cycling	+ 22"
7	Lars Petter Nordhaug (NOR)	Belkin Pro Cycling	+ 24"
8	Bartłomiej Matysiak (POL)	CCC–Polsat–Polkowice	+ 24"
9	Aleksejs Saramotins (LAT)	IAM Cycling	+ 24"
10	Sven Erik Bystrøm (NOR)	Team Øster Hus-Ridley	+ 24"

=== Stage 3 ===
23 May 2014 — Årnes to Budor, 177.7 km (110.4 mi)

Stage 3 Result

	Rider	Team	Time
1	Sep Vanmarcke (BEL)	Belkin Pro Cycling	4h 13' 15"
2	Gustav Larsson (SWE)	IAM Cycling	+ 1"
3	Gatis Smukulis (LAT)	Team Katusha	+ 4"
4	Stef Clement (NED)	Belkin Pro Cycling	+ 6"
5	Jérôme Baugnies (BEL)	Wanty–Groupe Gobert	+ 12"
6	Jarosław Marycz (POL)	CCC–Polsat–Polkowice	+ 13"
7	Aleksejs Saramotins (LAT)	IAM Cycling	+ 13"
8	Alexander Kristoff (NOR)	Team Katusha	+ 13"
9	Bauke Mollema (NED)	Belkin Pro Cycling	+ 13"
10	Gerald Ciolek (GER)	MTN–Qhubeka	+ 13"

General Classification after Stage 3

	Rider	Team	Time
1	Marc de Maar (CUR)	UnitedHealthcare	12h 16' 12"
2	Maciej Paterski (POL)	CCC–Polsat–Polkowice	+ 3"
3	Gustav Larsson (SWE)	IAM Cycling	+ 6"
4	Alexander Kristoff (NOR)	Team Katusha	+ 10"
5	Tom Van Asbroeck (BEL)	Topsport Vlaanderen–Baloise	+ 11"
6	Sondre Holst Enger (NOR)	Team Sparebanken Sør	+ 18"
7	Bauke Mollema (NED)	Belkin Pro Cycling	+ 22"
8	Jérôme Baugnies (BEL)	Wanty–Groupe Gobert	+ 23"
9	Lars Petter Nordhaug (NOR)	Belkin Pro Cycling	+ 24"
10	Aleksejs Saramotins (LAT)	IAM Cycling	+ 24"

=== Stage 4 ===
24 May 2014 — Brumunddal to Lillehammer, 195 km (121.2 mi)

Stage 4 Result

	Rider	Team	Time
1	Bauke Mollema (NED)	Belkin Pro Cycling	4h 53' 55"
2	Jesper Hansen (DEN)	Tinkoff–Saxo	+ 3"
3	Lars Petter Nordhaug (NOR)	Belkin Pro Cycling	+ 6"
4	Pello Bilbao (ESP)	Caja Rural–Seguros RGA	+ 6"
5	Kristoffer Skjerping (NOR)	Team Joker	+ 6"
6	Sven Erik Bystrøm (NOR)	Team Øster Hus-Ridley	+ 6"
7	Maciej Paterski (POL)	CCC–Polsat–Polkowice	+ 6"
8	Marc de Maar (CUR)	UnitedHealthcare	+ 6"
9	Rubén Fernández (Note: Rubén Fernández, as well as 18th placed Odd Christian Eiking (Team Joker), received the same time as Jesper Hansen. This was due to the fact that Fernández and Eiking both crashed on the final corner, having been in a group with Hansen.) (ESP)	Caja Rural–Seguros RGA	+ 3"
10	Jérôme Baugnies (BEL)	Wanty–Groupe Gobert	+ 6"

General Classification after Stage 4

	Rider	Team	Time
1	Marc de Maar (CUR)	UnitedHealthcare	17h 10' 13"
2	Maciej Paterski (POL)	CCC–Polsat–Polkowice	+ 3"
3	Bauke Mollema (NED)	Belkin Pro Cycling	+ 6"
4	Gustav Larsson (SWE)	IAM Cycling	+ 6"
5	Jesper Hansen (DEN)	Tinkoff–Saxo	+ 15"
6	Lars Petter Nordhaug (NOR)	Belkin Pro Cycling	+ 19"
7	Jérôme Baugnies (BEL)	Wanty–Groupe Gobert	+ 23"
8	Gerald Ciolek (GER)	MTN–Qhubeka	+ 24"
9	Sven Erik Bystrøm (NOR)	Team Øster Hus-Ridley	+ 24"
10	Pello Bilbao (ESP)	Caja Rural–Seguros RGA	+ 24"

=== Stage 5 ===
25 May 2014 — Gjøvik to Hønefoss–Eggemoen, 167 km (103.8 mi)

Stage 5 Result

	Rider	Team	Time
1	Alexander Kristoff (NOR)	Team Katusha	4h 04' 40"
2	Jempy Drucker (LUX)	Wanty–Groupe Gobert	s.t.
3	Gerald Ciolek (GER)	MTN–Qhubeka	s.t.
4	Maciej Paterski (POL)	CCC–Polsat–Polkowice	s.t.
5	Sébastien Reichenbach (SUI)	IAM Cycling	s.t.
6	Pello Bilbao (ESP)	Caja Rural–Seguros RGA	s.t.
7	Bjørn Tore Hoem (NOR)	Team Sparebanken Sør	s.t.
8	Sondre Holst Enger (NOR)	Team Sparebanken Sør	+ 6"
9	Tom Van Asbroeck (BEL)	Topsport Vlaanderen–Baloise	+ 6"
10	Daniele Bennati (ITA)	Tinkoff–Saxo	+ 6"

Final General Classification

	Rider	Team	Time
1	Maciej Paterski (POL)	CCC–Polsat–Polkowice	21h 14' 56"
2	Marc de Maar (CUR)	UnitedHealthcare	+ 3"
3	Bauke Mollema (NED)	Belkin Pro Cycling	+ 9"
4	Gustav Larsson (SWE)	IAM Cycling	+ 9"
5	Gerald Ciolek (GER)	MTN–Qhubeka	+ 15"
6	Jesper Hansen (DEN)	Tinkoff–Saxo	+ 18"
7	Pello Bilbao (ESP)	Caja Rural–Seguros RGA	+ 21"
8	Bjørn Tore Hoem (NOR)	Team Sparebanken Sør	+ 21"
9	Jérôme Baugnies (BEL)	Wanty–Groupe Gobert	+ 26"
10	Sven Erik Bystrøm (NOR)	Team Øster Hus-Ridley	+ 27"

== Classification leadership table ==
In the 2014 Tour of Norway, four different jerseys were awarded. For the general classification, calculated by adding each cyclist's finishing times on each stage, and allowing time bonuses (10, 6 and 4 seconds respectively) for the first three finishers on mass-start stages, the leader received a yellow jersey. Additionally, there were a points classification, awarding a green jersey, and mountains classification, the leadership of which was marked by a polka dot jersey. The fourth jersey represents the young rider classification, marked by a white jersey. This was decided the same way as the general classification, but only young riders were eligible. There was also classification for teams.

Stage	Winner	General classification	Points classification	Mountains classification	Young rider classification	Teams classification
1	Alexander Kristoff	Alexander Kristoff	Alexander Kristoff	Adrian Gjølberg	Sondre Holst Enger	Topsport Vlaanderen–Baloise
2	Marc de Maar	Marc de Maar	Alexander Kristoff	August Jensen	Tom Van Asbroeck	CCC–Polsat–Polkowice
3	Sep Vanmarcke	Marc de Maar	Alexander Kristoff	Sep Vanmarcke	Tom Van Asbroeck	Belkin Pro Cycling
4	Bauke Mollema	Marc de Maar	Alexander Kristoff	Amund Grøndahl	Jesper Hansen	IAM Cycling
5	Alexander Kristoff	Maciej Paterski	Alexander Kristoff	Amund Grøndahl	Jesper Hansen	IAM Cycling
Final		Maciej Paterski	Alexander Kristoff	Amund Grøndahl	Jesper Hansen	IAM Cycling
