= 2013 UCI Road World Championships – Men's under-23 road race =

Men's under-23 road race
2013 UCI Road World Championships
- Rainbow jersey

Race details
- Dates: 27 September 2013
- Stages: 1

The Men's under-23 road race of the 2013 UCI Road World Championships took place in Tuscany, Italy on 27 September 2013.

== Final classification ==
Rank	Rider	Country	Time
1	Matej Mohorič	Slovenia	4 h 20 min 18 s
2	Louis Meintjes	South Africa	+3 s
3	Sondre Holst Enger	Norway	+13 s
4	Caleb Ewan	Australia	+13 s
5	Toms Skujiņš	Latvia	+13 s
6	Davide Villella	Italy	+13 s
7	Dylan van Baarle	Netherlands	+13 s
8	Silvio Herklotz	Germany	+13 s
9	Julian Alaphilippe	France	+13 s
10	Patrick Konrad	Austria	+13 s
11	Clément Chevrier	France	+13 s
12	Jan Hirt	Czech Republic	+13 s
13	Nathan Brown	United States	+13 s
14	Frederico Figueiredo	Portugal	+13 s
15	Merhawi Kudus	Eritrea	+13 s
16	Odd Christian Eiking	Norway	+13 s
17	Simon Yates	Great Britain	+13 s
18	Sebastián Henao	Colombia	+13 s
19	Adam Yates	Great Britain	+13 s
20	Ilia Koshevoy	Belarus	+16 s
21	Flavien Dassonville	France	+45 s
22	Ildar Arslanov	Russia	+52 s
23	Felix Großschartner	Austria	+53 s
24	Stephan Rabitsch	Austria	+53 s
25	Jasper Stuyven	Belgium	+1 min 14 s
26	Jasha Sütterlin	Germany	+1 min 25 s
27	Stefan Küng	Switzerland	+1 min 25 s
28	Karel Hník	Czech Republic	+1 min 25 s
29	Adrien Chenaux	Switzerland	+1 min 25 s
30	Bakhtiyar Kozhatayev	Kazakhstan	+1 min 27 s
31	Adam Phelan	Australia	+1 min 27 s
32	Zico Waeytens	Belgium	+1 min 30 s
33	Tanner Putt	United States	+1 min 39 s
34	Andrea Zordan	Italy	+1 min 45 s
35	Daniel Jaramillo	Colombia	+2 min 27 s
36	Magnus Cort Nielsen	Denmark	+2 min 33 s
37	Mike Teunissen	Netherlands	+2 min 33 s
38	Sjors Roosen	Netherlands	+2 min 33 s
39	Gregor Mühlberger	Austria	+2 min 33 s
40	Emanuel Piaskowy	Poland	+2 min 33 s
41	Daniil Fominykh	Kazakhstan	+2 min 33 s
42	Louis Vervaeke	Belgium	+2 min 33 s
43	Derk Abel Beckeringh	Netherlands	+2 min 33 s
44	Eder Frayre	Mexico	+2 min 33 s
45	Łukasz Wiśniowski	Poland	+2 min 33 s
46	Antoine Duchesne	Canada	+2 min 33 s
47	Tilegen Maidos	Kazakhstan	+2 min 33 s
48	Luis Lemus	Mexico	+2 min 33 s
49	Cristian Raileanu	Moldova	+2 min 33 s
50	Damien Howson	Australia	+2 min 42 s
51	Bjørn Tore Hoem	Norway	+3 min 18 s
52	James Oram	New Zealand	+4 min 14 s
53	Fredrik Strand Galta	Norway	+4 min 14 s
54	Tiesj Benoot	Belgium	+4 min 14 s
55	Facundo Lezica	Argentina	+4 min 14 s
56	Fredrik Ludvigsson	Sweden	+5 min 27 s
57	Alexis Gougeard	France	+6 min 36 s
58	Alberto Bettiol	Italy	+6 min 36 s
59	Davide Formolo	Italy	+6 min 36 s
60	Michael Valgren	Denmark	+6 min 36 s
61	Roman Katirin	Russia	+6 min 52 s
62	Juan Ernesto Chamorro	Colombia	+6 min 52 s
63	Natnael Berhane	Eritrea	+6 min 52 s
64	Johann van Zyl	South Africa	+7 min 7 s
65	Rubén Fernández Andújar	Spain	+8 min 6 s
66	Mikhail Akimov	Russia	+8 min 40 s
67	Gennadi Tatarinov	Russia	+8 min 40 s
68	Emanuel Buchmann	Germany	+8 min 40 s
69	Nicolae Tanovițchii	Moldova	+8 min 40 s
70	Emiel Dolfsma	Netherlands	+10 min 49 s
71	Simon Pellaud	Switzerland	+11 min 10 s
72	Heiner Parra	Colombia	+11 min 10 s
73	Kristian Haugaard	Denmark	+11 min 10 s
74	Patryk Stosz	Poland	+11 min 10 s
75	Tesfom Okbamariam	Eritrea	+14 min 45 s
76	Rick Zabel	Germany	+15 min 24 s
77	Dion Smith	New Zealand	+15 min 24 s
78	Jaka Bostner	Slovenia	+15 min 24 s
79	Emīls Liepiņš	Latvia	+15 min 54 s
80	Erik Baška	Slovakia	+16 min 8 s
81	Marlen Zmorka	Ukraine	+16 min 8 s
82	Ihar Mytsko	Belarus	+16 min 8 s
83	Carlos Barbero	Spain	+16 min 10 s
84	Mario González Salas	Spain	+16 min 10 s
-	Roy Goldstein	Israel	DNF

Rank	Rider	Country	Time
-	Yoav Bear	Israel	DNF
-	René Corella	Mexico	DNF
-	Henry Velasco	Ecuador	DNF
-	Peeter Tarvis	Estonia	DNF
-	Emil Vinjebo	Denmark	DNF
-	Kolya Shumov	Belarus	DNF
-	Anass Ait El Abdia	Morocco	DNF
-	Maxat Ayazbayev	Kazakhstan	DNF
-	Awet Gebremedhin	Eritrea	DNF
-	Meron Teshome	Eritrea	DNF
-	Vladislau Dubovski	Belarus	DNF
-	Oskar Svendsen	Norway	DNF
-	Olivier Le Gac	France	DNF
-	Nick van der Lijke	Netherlands	DNF
-	Marcelo Paspuezán	Ecuador	DNF
-	Mikel Iturria	Spain	DNF
-	Lawson Craddock	United States	DNF
-	Sven Erik Bystrøm	Norway	DNF
-	Edward Theuns	Belgium	DNF
-	Nathan Wilson	United States	DNF
-	Haritz Orbe	Spain	DNF
-	Alistair Slater	Great Britain	DNF
-	Campbell Flakemore	Australia	DNF
-	Bradley Linfield	Australia	DNF
-	Zhandos Bizhigitov	Kazakhstan	DNF
-	Ariel Sivori	Argentina	DNF
-	Tsgabu Grmay	Ethiopia	DNF
-	Tim Mikelj	Slovenia	DNF
-	Samuel Spokes	Australia	DNF
-	Richard Carapaz	Ecuador	DNF
-	Andžs Flaksis	Latvia	DNF
-	Pierre-Henri Lecuisinier	France	DNF
-	Joseph Perret	Great Britain	DNF
-	Owain Doull	Great Britain	DNF
-	Mark Dzamastagic	Slovenia	DNF
-	Brayan Ramírez	Colombia	DNF
-	Eduardo Sepúlveda	Argentina	DNF
-	Michele Scartezzini	Italy	DNF
-	Jovan Zekavica	Serbia	DNF
-	Miloš Borisavljević	Serbia	DNF
-	Johannes Weber	Germany	DNF
-	Eduard-Michael Grosu	Romania	DNF
-	Burr Ho	Hong Kong	DNF
-	Pedro Rodríguez	Ecuador	DNF
-	Feritcan Şamlı	Turkey	DNF
-	Samir Jabrayilov	Azerbaijan	DNF
-	Adil Barbari	Algeria	DNF
-	Kim Magnusson	Sweden	DNF
-	Maxim Rusnac	Moldova	DNF
-	Marcus Fåglum Karlsson	Sweden	DNF
-	Gavin Mannion	United States	DNF
-	Soufiane Haddi	Morocco	DNF
-	Josef Černý	Czech Republic	DNF
-	Josef Hošek	Czech Republic	DNF
-	Lukas Pöstlberger	Austria	DNF
-	Dieter Bouvry	Belgium	DNF
-	Salah Eddine Mraouni	Morocco	DNF
-	Alexander Foliforov	Russia	DNF
-	Hichem Kab	Algeria	DNF
-	Ben Einhorn	Israel	DNF
-	Mekseb Debesay	Eritrea	DNF
-	Zoltán Sipos	Romania	DNF
-	David Dvorský	Czech Republic	DNF
-	Ľuboš Malovec	Slovakia	DNF
-	Nassim Saidi	Algeria	DNF
-	Carlos Quishpe	Ecuador	DNF
-	Ido Zilberstein	Israel	DNF
-	Krists Neilands	Latvia	DNF
-	Alex Frame	New Zealand	DNF
-	Christopher Jennings	South Africa	DNF
-	Jonathan Dibben	Great Britain	DNF
-	Michal Kolář	Slovakia	DNF
-	Juraj Lajcha	Slovakia	DNF
-	Asbjørn Kragh Andersen	Denmark	DNF
-	Andris Vosekalns	Latvia	DNF
-	Youssef Harrouch	Morocco	DNF
-	Kristian Neemela	Estonia	DNF
-	Adiq Husainie Othman	Malaysia	DNF
-	Julio Cesar Benitez Rubio	Mexico	DNF
-	Mihkel Räim	Estonia	DNF
-	Abdallah El Err	Lebanon	DNF
-	Andrei Voicu	Romania	DNF
-	Marko Danilović	Serbia	DNF
-	Ilhan Celik	Turkey	DNF
-	Luka Pibernik	Slovenia	DNF
