= Tour of Norway =

Norwegian multi-day road cycling race

Race details
- Date: May/June
- Region: Norway
- Discipline: Road
- Competition: UCI ProSeries (men/women)
- Organiser: Cycling Event Norway AS
- Web site: www.tourofnorway.com

History (men)
- First edition: 2011
- Editions: 14 (as of 2026)
- First winner: Wilco Kelderman (NED)
- Most wins: Edvald Boasson Hagen (NOR) (3 wins)
- Most recent: Matthew Brennan (GBR)

History (women)
- First edition: 2025
- Editions: 1 (as of 2026)
- First winner: Mie Bjørndal Ottestad (NOR)
- Most wins: No repeat winners
- Most recent: Mie Bjørndal Ottestad (NOR)

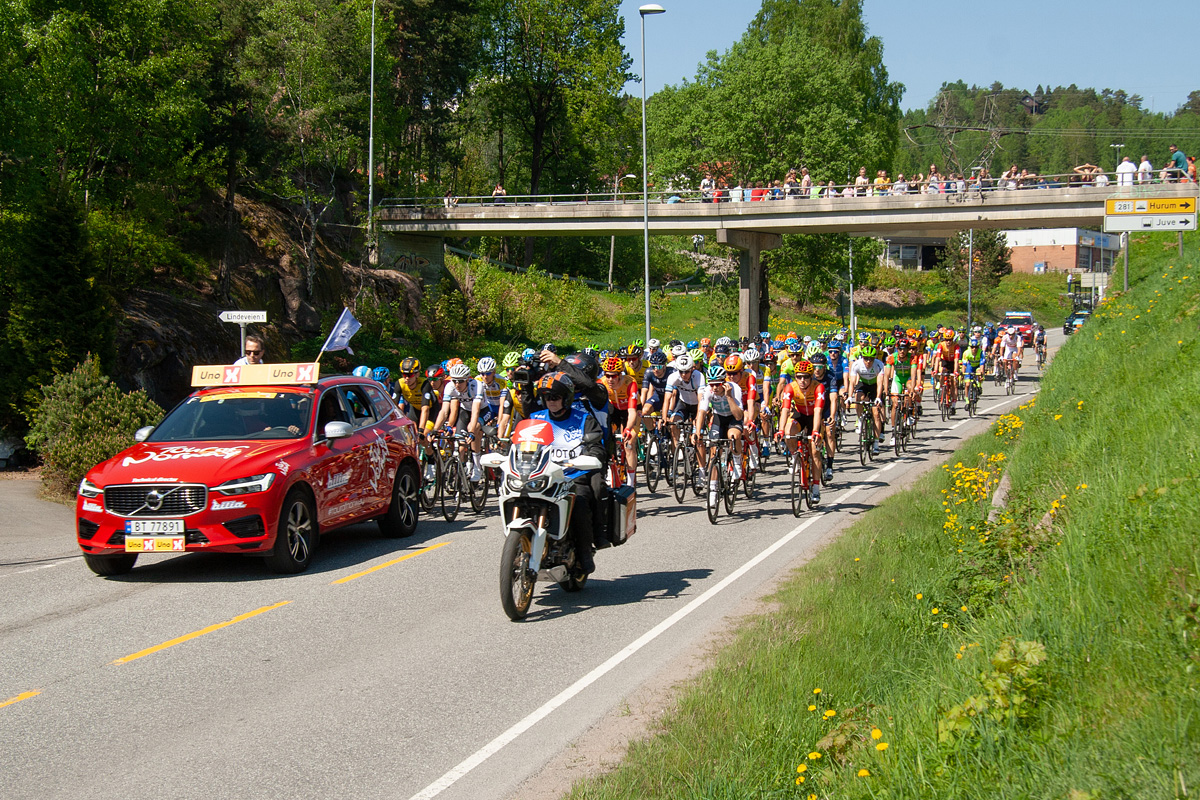
2018 Tour of Norway: Stage 1 Start in Svelvik

The Tour of Norway is a road bicycle race held annually in Norway. It is considered as a successor to the stage race Ringerike GP, which is now a one-day race. It was started in 2011 as a result of the heightened interest in cycling in Norway, mainly due to good results of professional cyclists Thor Hushovd and Edvald Boasson Hagen. The race is ranked 2.HC on the UCI Europe Tour, and is part of the new UCI ProSeries since 2020.

From the 2019 season the race merged with Tour des Fjords to form a new six day stage race that covers all of the southern counties of Norway; the race had previously only been held in Eastern Norway. The first edition of the new race was held from May 28 until June 2, 2019.

== Women's race ==
In 2025, Tour of Norway organizers introduced Tour of Norway Women. The race was rated 2.1 in Women's Elite series.

== Winners ==
=== Men's race ===
Year	Country	Rider	Team
2011	Netherlands	Wilco Kelderman	Rabobank
2012	Norway	Edvald Boasson Hagen	Team Sky
2013	Norway	Edvald Boasson Hagen	Team Sky
2014	Poland	Maciej Paterski	CCC–Polsat–Polkowice
2015	Denmark	Jesper Hansen	Tinkoff–Saxo
2016	Netherlands	Pieter Weening	Roompot–Oranje Peloton
2017	Norway	Edvald Boasson Hagen	Team Dimension Data
2018	Spain	Eduard Prades	Euskadi–Murias
2019	Norway	Alexander Kristoff	UAE Team Emirates
2020	No race due to the COVID-19 pandemic.		
2021	Great Britain	Ethan Hayter	Ineos Grenadiers
2022	Belgium	Remco Evenepoel	Quick-Step Alpha Vinyl Team
2023	Great Britain	Ben Tulett	Ineos Grenadiers
2024	France	Axel Laurance	Alpecin–Deceuninck
2025	Great Britain	Matthew Brennan	Visma–Lease a Bike
2026	No race due to budget restraint.		

=== Wins per country (men) ===
Wins	Country
4	Norway
3	Great Britain
2	Netherlands
1	Belgium; Denmark; France; Poland; Spain

=== Women's race ===
Year	Country	Rider	Team
2025	Norway	Mie Bjørndal Ottestad	Uno-X Mobility
2026	No race due to budget restraint.		

=== Wins per country (women) ===
Wins	Country
1	Norway

== Classifications ==
As of the 2023 edition, the jerseys worn by the leaders of the individual classifications are:

- Orange Jersey – Worn by the leader of the general classification.
- Blue Jersey – Worn by the leader of the points classification.
- Blue Polkadot Jersey – Worn by the leader of the climber classification.
- White Jersey – Worn by the best rider under 23 years of age on the overall classification.
