= Jesper Hansen (cyclist) =

Danish cyclist

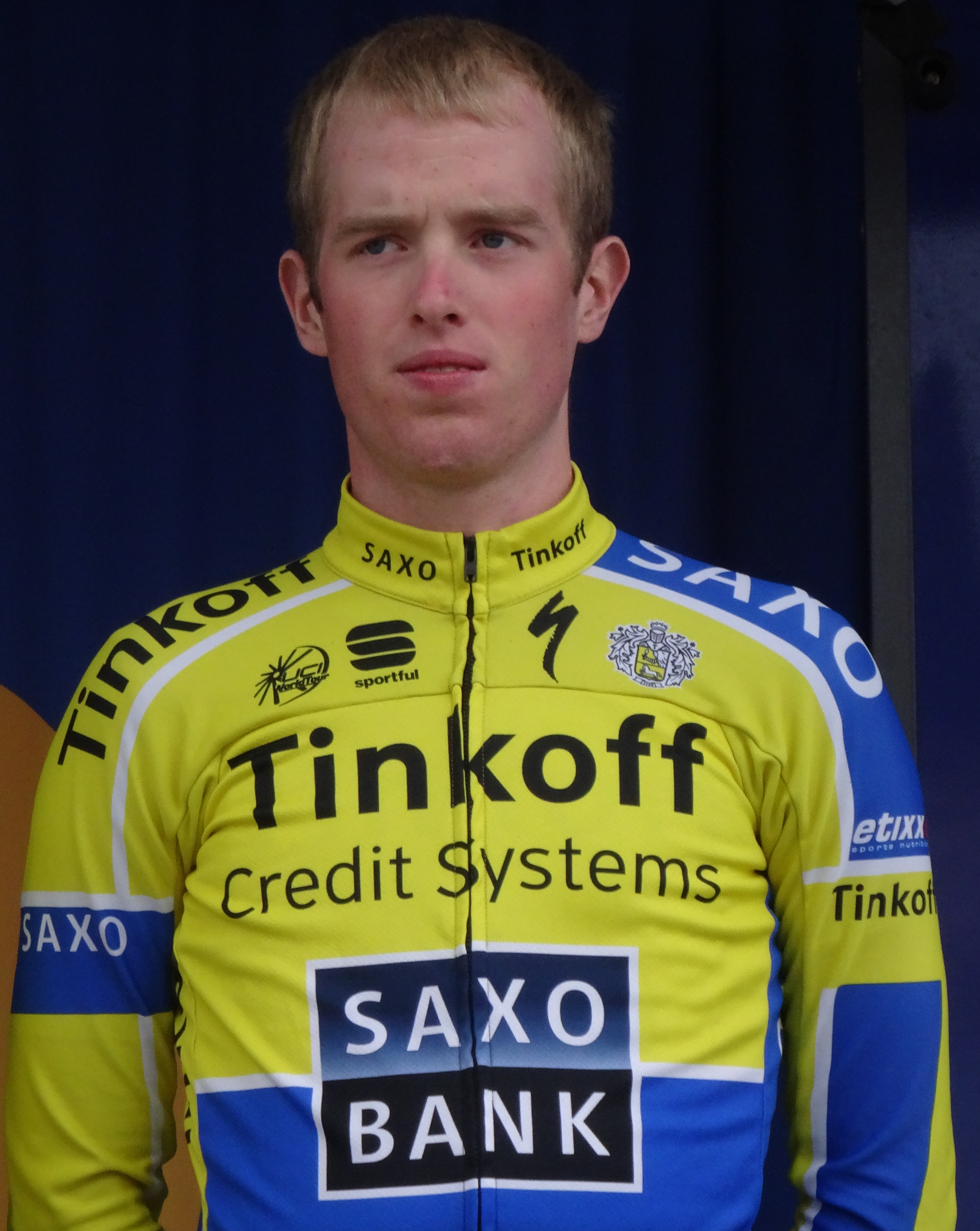
- Hansen in 2014

Personal information
- Full name: Jesper Hansen
- Born: 23 October 1990 (age 35) Copenhagen, Denmark
- Height: 1.72 m (5 ft 7 1/2 in)
- Weight: 60 kg (130 lb; 9 st 6 lb)

Cycling career
- Sport: Cycling
- Current team: Retired
- Discipline: Road
- Role: Rider
- Rider type: Climber

Amateur teams
- 2009: Svendborg CC
- 2009: Energi Fyn
- 2010: Odder CK

Professional teams
- 2011: Energi Fyn
- 2012–2013: Glud & Marstrand–LRØ
- 2013: Saxo–Tinkoff (stagiaire)
- 2014–2016: Tinkoff–Saxo
- 2017–2018: Astana
- 2019–2020: Cofidis
- 2021: Riwal Cycling Team

Major wins
- Stage races Tour of Norway (2015)

Jesper Hansen (born 23 October 1990) is a Danish former professional cyclist, who rode professionally between 2011 and 2021 for six different teams.

== Career ==
In 2014 he received the Young rider classification jersey at the Tour of Norway, for being the best rider under 25 years of age in the overall classification standings.

While riding the Tour de Romandie, he slammed into the door of a medical car. The door was carelessly opened and knocked Hansen down. While appearing injured at first, he ultimately soldiered on and continued the race. He was named in the start list for the 2015 Vuelta a España, the 2017 Giro d'Italia, and the 2018 Tour de France.

After Hansen's contract was not renewed by Cofidis after the 2020 season, he initially considered retirement. However, Riwal Cycling Team, which was forced to step down from UCI ProTeam to UCI Continental level due to financial difficulties, signed Hansen to a one-year contract for the 2021 season, which the two parties had previously agreed upon once the team secured their financial standing. He retired following the season, ending his career with two professional victories.

== Major results ==
2013
2nd Hadeland GP
6th Overall Circuit des Ardennes
6th Overall Tour de Normandie
7th Overall Tour of Norway
2014
6th Overall Tour of Norway

1st Young rider classification

2015
1st Overall Tour of Norway

1st Stage 3

6th Overall Tour de Langkawi
2016
2nd Overall Tour of Croatia

1st Stage 5 (TTT)

5th Overall Tour de Langkawi
10th Overall Abu Dhabi Tour
2017
2nd Overall Tour of Turkey
9th Overall Tour of Croatia
2018
9th Overall Volta a Catalunya
2019
7th Overall Tour of California

=== Grand Tour general classification results timeline ===
Grand Tour	2015	2016	2017	2018	2019	2020
Giro d'Italia	—	—	32	—	—	44
Tour de France	—	—	—	56	—	—
Vuelta a España	52	—	DNF	—	DNF	—

Legend
—	Did not compete
DNF	Did not finish
