= 2015 Tour of Norway =

2015 UCI Europe Tour

Race details
- Dates: 20–24 May
- Stages: 5
- Distance: 899.2 km (558.7 mi)
- Winning time: 23h 14' 57"

Results
Jersey awarded to the overall winner	Winner	Jesper Hansen (DEN)	(Tinkoff–Saxo)
	Second	Edvald Boasson Hagen (NOR)	(MTN–Qhubeka)
	Third	David López (ESP)	(Team Sky)
Jersey awarded to the points classification winner	Points	Alexander Kristoff (NOR)	(Team Katusha)
Jersey awarded to the mountains classification winner	Mountains	Vegard Robinson Bugge (NOR)	(Team Sparebanken Sør)
Jersey awarded to the young rider classification winner	Young rider	Odd Christian Eiking (NOR)	(Team Joker)
	Team	Cult Energy Pro Cycling	

The 2015 Tour of Norway was the fifth edition of the Tour of Norway cycle stage race. It was a part of the 2015 UCI Europe Tour as a 2.HC event. It was won by Denmark's Jesper Hansen, riding for the Tinkoff–Saxo team.

== Schedule ==
The race was held over five stages.

Stage	Date	Course	Distance	Type	Winner	Ref
1	20 May	Årnes to Sarpsborg	182.6 km (113.5 mi)	Hilly stage	Alexander Kristoff (NOR)	
2	21 May	Drammen to Langesund	193 km (119.9 mi)	Hilly stage	Alexander Kristoff (NOR)	
3	22 May	Skien to Rjukan	181.3 km (112.7 mi)	Mountain stage	Jesper Hansen (DEN)	
4	23 May	Rjukan to Geilo	168.3 km (104.6 mi)	Intermediate stage	Amets Txurruka (ESP)	
5	24 May	Flå to Hønefoss Airport, Eggemoen	174 km (108.1 mi)	Intermediate stage	Andreas Vangstad (NOR)	
Total		899.2 km (558.7 mi)				

== Teams ==
21 teams were selected to take place in the 2015 Tour of Norway. Six of these were UCI WorldTeams, eight were UCI Professional Continental teams, and seven were UCI Continental teams.

UCI WorldTeams

- Team Katusha
- Lotto–Soudal
- Tinkoff–Saxo
- Team Sky
- Orica–GreenEDGE
- Trek Factory Racing

UCI Professional Continental teams

- MTN–Qhubeka
- Topsport Vlaanderen–Baloise
- Wanty–Groupe Gobert
- Caja Rural–Seguros RGA
- Team Novo Nordisk
- CCC–Sprandi–Polkowice
- Team Roompot
- Cult Energy Pro Cycling

Continental teams

- Team Joker
- Team Tre Berg–Bianchi
- Riwal Platform
- Team Coop–Øster Hus
- Team Ringeriks–Kraft
- Team Sparebanken Sør
- Team FixIT.no

== Stages ==
=== Stage 1 ===
20 May 2015 — Årnes to Sarpsborg, 182.6 km (113.5 mi)

Stage 1 result
Rank	Rider	Team	Time
1	Alexander Kristoff (NOR)	Team Katusha	4h 42' 05"
2	Caleb Ewan (AUS)	Orica–GreenEDGE	+ 0"
3	Edvald Boasson Hagen (NOR)	MTN–Qhubeka	+ 0"
4	Andrew Fenn (GBR)	Team Sky	+ 0"
5	Tosh Van der Sande (BEL)	Lotto–Soudal	+ 0"
6	Nikolay Trusov (RUS)	Tinkoff–Saxo	+ 0"
7	Fabian Wegmann (GER)	Cult Energy Pro Cycling	+ 0"
8	Boris Vallée (BEL)	Lotto–Soudal	+ 0"
9	Lars Petter Nordhaug (NOR)	Team Sky	+ 0"
10	Fredrik Strand Galta (NOR)	Team Coop–Øster Hus	+ 0"

General classification after stage 1
Rank	Rider	Team	Time
1	Alexander Kristoff (NOR)	Team Katusha	4h 41' 55"
2	Caleb Ewan (AUS)	Orica–GreenEDGE	+ 4"
3	Vegard Stake Laengen (NOR)	Team Joker	+ 4"
4	Oscar Landa (NOR)	Team Coop–Øster Hus	+ 5"
5	Edvald Boasson Hagen (NOR)	MTN–Qhubeka	+ 6"
6	Andrew Fenn (GBR)	Team Sky	+ 10"
7	Tosh Van der Sande (BEL)	Lotto–Soudal	+ 10"
8	Nikolay Trusov (RUS)	Tinkoff–Saxo	+ 10"
9	Fabian Wegmann (GER)	Cult Energy Pro Cycling	+ 10"
10	Boris Vallée (BEL)	Lotto–Soudal	+ 10"

=== Stage 2 ===
21 May 2015 — Drammen to Langesund, 193 km (119.9 mi)

Stage 2 result
Rank	Rider	Team	Time
1	Alexander Kristoff (NOR)	Team Katusha	5h 05' 33"
2	Caleb Ewan (AUS)	Orica–GreenEDGE	+ 0"
3	Andrew Fenn (GBR)	Team Sky	+ 0"
4	André Looij (NED)	Team Roompot	+ 0"
5	Nikolay Trusov (RUS)	Tinkoff–Saxo	+ 0"
6	Rasmus Guldhammer (DEN)	Cult Energy Pro Cycling	+ 0"
7	Jacopo Guarnieri (ITA)	Team Katusha	+ 0"
8	Jarl Salomein (BEL)	Topsport Vlaanderen–Baloise	+ 0"
9	Edvald Boasson Hagen (NOR)	MTN–Qhubeka	+ 0"
10	Amund Grøndahl Jansen (NOR)	Team Joker	+ 0"

General classification after stage 2
Rank	Rider	Team	Time
1	Alexander Kristoff (NOR)	Team Katusha	9h 47' 18"
2	Caleb Ewan (AUS)	Orica–GreenEDGE	+ 8"
3	Vegard Stake Laengen (NOR)	Team Joker	+ 14"
4	Ángel Madrazo (ESP)	Caja Rural–Seguros RGA	+ 14"
5	Oscar Landa (NOR)	Team Coop–Øster Hus	+ 15"
6	Andrew Fenn (GBR)	Team Sky	+ 16"
7	Edvald Boasson Hagen (NOR)	MTN–Qhubeka	+ 16"
8	Anders Skaarseth (NOR)	Team Joker	+ 17"
9	Nikolay Trusov (RUS)	Tinkoff–Saxo	+ 20"
10	Tosh Van der Sande (BEL)	Lotto–Soudal	+ 20"

=== Stage 3 ===
22 May 2015 — Skien to Rjukan, 181.3 km (112.7 mi)

Stage 3 result
Rank	Rider	Team	Time
1	Jesper Hansen (DEN)	Tinkoff–Saxo	4h 46' 30"
2	Edvald Boasson Hagen (NOR)	MTN–Qhubeka	+ 38"
3	Ivan Santaromita (ITA)	Orica–GreenEDGE	+ 1' 05"
4	David López (ESP)	Team Sky	+ 1' 05"
5	Andreas Vangstad (NOR)	Team Sparebanken Sør	+ 1' 05"
6	Gustav Larsson (SWE)	Cult Energy Pro Cycling	+ 1' 05"
7	Odd Christian Eiking (NOR)	Team Joker	+ 1' 30"
8	Sean De Bie (BEL)	Lotto–Soudal	+ 1' 30"
9	Vegard Stake Laengen (NOR)	Team Joker	+ 1' 30"
10	Alexander Kristoff (NOR)	Team Katusha	+ 1' 30"

General classification after stage 3
Rank	Rider	Team	Time
1	Jesper Hansen (DEN)	Tinkoff–Saxo	14h 33' 58"
2	Edvald Boasson Hagen (NOR)	MTN–Qhubeka	+ 38"
3	Gustav Larsson (SWE)	Cult Energy Pro Cycling	+ 1' 15"
4	David López (ESP)	Team Sky	+ 1' 15"
5	Andreas Vangstad (NOR)	Team Sparebanken Sør	+ 1' 15"
6	Alexander Kristoff (NOR)	Team Katusha	+ 1' 20"
7	Ivan Santaromita (ITA)	Orica–GreenEDGE	+ 1' 24"
8	Vegard Stake Laengen (NOR)	Team Joker	+ 1' 34"
9	Ángel Madrazo (ESP)	Caja Rural–Seguros RGA	+ 1' 34"
10	Fabian Wegmann (GER)	Cult Energy Pro Cycling	+ 1' 40"

=== Stage 4 ===
23 May 2015 — Rjukan to Geilo, 168.3 km (104.6 mi)

Stage 4 result
Rank	Rider	Team	Time
1	Amets Txurruka (ESP)	Caja Rural–Seguros RGA	4h 30' 11"
2	David López (ESP)	Team Sky	+ 2"
3	Davide Rebellin (ITA)	CCC–Sprandi–Polkowice	+ 5"
4	Jesper Hansen (DEN)	Tinkoff–Saxo	+ 5"
5	Fredrik Strand Galta (NOR)	Team Coop–Øster Hus	+ 7"
6	Lars Petter Nordhaug (NOR)	Team Sky	+ 11"
7	Francis De Greef (BEL)	Wanty–Groupe Gobert	+ 11"
8	Odd Christian Eiking (NOR)	Team Joker	+ 11"
9	Fränk Schleck (LUX)	Trek Factory Racing	+ 14"
10	Ivan Santaromita (ITA)	Orica–GreenEDGE	+ 14"

General classification after stage 4
Rank	Rider	Team	Time
1	Jesper Hansen (DEN)	Tinkoff–Saxo	19h 04' 14"
2	Edvald Boasson Hagen (NOR)	MTN–Qhubeka	+ 47"
3	David López (ESP)	Team Sky	+ 1' 05"
4	Ivan Santaromita (ITA)	Orica–GreenEDGE	+ 1' 33"
5	Gustav Larsson (SWE)	Cult Energy Pro Cycling	+ 1' 34"
6	Davide Rebellin (ITA)	CCC–Sprandi–Polkowice	+ 1' 36"
7	Fredrik Strand Galta (NOR)	Team Coop–Øster Hus	+ 1' 40"
8	Lars Petter Nordhaug (NOR)	Team Sky	+ 1' 46"
9	Alexander Kristoff (NOR)	Team Katusha	+ 1' 47"
10	Vegard Stake Laengen (NOR)	Team Joker	+ 1' 53"

=== Stage 5 ===
24 May 2015 — Flå to Hønefoss Airport, Eggemoen, 174 km (108.1 mi)

Stage 5 result
Rank	Rider	Team	Time
1	Andreas Vangstad (NOR)	Team Sparebanken Sør	4h 10' 29"
2	Fredrik Strand Galta (NOR)	Team Coop–Øster Hus	+ 11"
3	Alexander Kristoff (NOR)	Team Katusha	+ 14"
4	Pim Ligthart (NED)	Lotto–Soudal	+ 14"
5	Rasmus Guldhammer (DEN)	Cult Energy Pro Cycling	+ 14"
6	Bauke Mollema (NED)	Trek Factory Racing	+ 14"
7	Tosh Van der Sande (BEL)	Lotto–Soudal	+ 14"
8	Vegard Stake Laengen (NOR)	Team Joker	+ 14"
9	Yannick Eijssen (BEL)	Wanty–Groupe Gobert	+ 14"
10	Bjørn Tore Hoem (NOR)	Team Joker	+ 14"

Final general classification
Rank	Rider	Team	Time
1	Jesper Hansen (DEN)	Tinkoff–Saxo	23h 14' 57"
2	Edvald Boasson Hagen (NOR)	MTN–Qhubeka	+ 47"
3	David López (ESP)	Team Sky	+ 1' 05"
4	Fredrik Strand Galta (NOR)	Team Coop–Øster Hus	+ 1' 31"
5	Andreas Vangstad (NOR)	Team Sparebanken Sør	+ 1' 32"
6	Ivan Santaromita (ITA)	Orica–GreenEDGE	+ 1' 33"
7	Davide Rebellin (ITA)	CCC–Sprandi–Polkowice	+ 1' 36"
8	Alexander Kristoff (NOR)	Team Katusha	+ 1' 43"
9	Gustav Larsson (SWE)	Cult Energy Pro Cycling	+ 1' 46"
10	Lars Petter Nordhaug (NOR)	Team Sky	+ 1' 51"

== Classification leadership ==
In the 2015 Tour of Norway, four different jerseys were awarded. For the general classification, calculated by adding each cyclist's finishing times on each stage, and allowing time bonuses (10, 6 and 4 seconds respectively) for the first three finishers on mass-start stages, the leader received a yellow jersey. Additionally, there was a points classification, awarding a green jersey, and a mountains classification, the leadership of which was marked by a polka dot jersey. The fourth jersey represented the young rider classification, marked by a white jersey. This was decided in the same way as the general classification, but only young riders were eligible. There was also a classification for teams.

Stage	Winner	General classification	Points classification	Mountains classification	Young rider classification	Team classification
1	Alexander Kristoff	Alexander Kristoff	Alexander Kristoff	Oscar Landa	Caleb Ewan	Team Sky
2	Alexander Kristoff	Alexander Kristoff	Alexander Kristoff	Vegard Robinson Bugge	Caleb Ewan	Team Sky
3	Jesper Hansen	Jesper Hansen	Alexander Kristoff	Vegard Robinson Bugge	Anders Skaarseth	Cult Energy Pro Cycling
4	Amets Txurruka	Jesper Hansen	Alexander Kristoff	Vegard Robinson Bugge	Odd Christian Eiking	Cult Energy Pro Cycling
5	Andreas Vangstad	Jesper Hansen	Alexander Kristoff	Vegard Robinson Bugge	Odd Christian Eiking	Cult Energy Pro Cycling
Final		Jesper Hansen	Alexander Kristoff	Vegard Robinson Bugge	Odd Christian Eiking	Cult Energy Pro Cycling

== Final standings ==
Legend
Yellow jersey	Denotes the leader of the General classification	White jersey	Denotes the leader of the Young rider classification
Green jersey	Denotes the leader of the Points classification	Polkadot jersey	Denotes the leader of the Mountains classification

=== General classification ===
Final general classification
Rank	Rider	Team	Time
1	Jesper Hansen (DEN)	Tinkoff–Saxo	23h 14' 57"
2	Edvald Boasson Hagen (NOR)	MTN–Qhubeka	+ 47"
3	David López (ESP)	Team Sky	+ 1' 05"
4	Fredrik Strand Galta (NOR)	Team Coop–Øster Hus	+ 1' 31"
5	Andreas Vangstad (NOR)	Team Sparebanken Sør	+ 1' 32"
6	Ivan Santaromita (ITA)	Orica–GreenEDGE	+ 1' 33"
7	Davide Rebellin (ITA)	CCC–Sprandi–Polkowice	+ 1' 36"
8	Alexander Kristoff (NOR)	Team Katusha	+ 1' 43"
9	Gustav Larsson (SWE)	Cult Energy Pro Cycling	+ 1' 46"
10	Lars Petter Nordhaug (NOR)	Team Sky	+ 1' 51"

=== Young rider classification ===
Final young rider classification
Rank	Rider	Team	Time
1	Odd Christian Eiking (NOR)	Team Joker	23h 16' 53"
2	Anders Skaarseth (NOR)	Team Joker	+ 1' 20"
3	Ole André Austevoll (NOR)	Team FixIT.no	+ 8' 24"
4	Lucas Eriksson (SWE)	Team Tre Berg–Bianchi	+ 9' 51"
5	Øivind Lukkedal (NOR)	Team Ringeriks–Kraft	+ 11' 51"
6	Markus Hoelgaard (NOR)	Team Coop–Øster Hus	+ 16' 15"
7	Caleb Ewan (AUS)	Orica–GreenEDGE	+ 17' 55"
8	Boris Vallée (BEL)	Lotto–Soudal	+ 19' 08"
9	Sindre Lunke (NOR)	Team Joker	+ 20' 15"
10	Kristian Aasvold (NOR)	Team Sparebanken Sør	+ 22' 29"

=== Points classification ===
Final points classification
Rank	Rider	Team	Points
1	Alexander Kristoff (NOR)	Team Katusha	53
2	Edvald Boasson Hagen (NOR)	MTN–Qhubeka	39
3	Fredrik Strand Galta (NOR)	Team Coop–Øster Hus	33
4	David López (ESP)	Team Sky	29
5	Caleb Ewan (AUS)	Orica–GreenEDGE	28
6	Jesper Hansen (DEN)	Tinkoff–Saxo	27
7	Vegard Stake Laengen (NOR)	Team Joker	27
8	Andreas Vangstad (NOR)	Team Sparebanken Sør	26
9	Tosh Van der Sande (BEL)	Lotto–Soudal	25
10	Andrew Fenn (GBR)	Team Sky	25

=== Mountains classification ===
Final mountains classification
Rank	Rider	Team	Points
1	Vegard Robinson Bugge (NOR)	Team Sparebanken Sør	28
2	Pim Ligthart (NED)	Lotto–Soudal	20
3	Anders Skaarseth (NOR)	Team Joker	18
4	David López (ESP)	Team Sky	14
5	Jesper Hansen (DEN)	Tinkoff–Saxo	13
6	Evgeni Petrov (RUS)	Tinkoff–Saxo	9
7	Edvald Boasson Hagen (NOR)	MTN–Qhubeka	8
8	Ivan Santaromita (ITA)	Orica–GreenEDGE	8
9	Boris Vallée (BEL)	Lotto–Soudal	8
10	Gustav Larsson (SWE)	Cult Energy Pro Cycling	7

=== Teams classification ===
Final teams classification
Rank	Team	Time
1	Cult Energy Pro Cycling	69h 50' 35"
2	Caja Rural–Seguros RGA	+ 14"
3	Team Joker	+ 21"
4	Wanty–Groupe Gobert	+ 8' 57"
5	Team Katusha	+ 9' 01"
6	Tinkoff–Saxo	+ 11' 09"
7	Orica–GreenEDGE	+ 14' 15"
8	Team Sparebanken Sør	+ 14' 26"
9	Team Coop–Øster Hus	+ 16' 29"
10	Topsport Vlaanderen–Baloise	+ 16' 49"
