= 2013 Tour of Norway =

2013 Glava Tour of Norway
2013 UCI Europe Tour

Race details
- Dates: 15—19 May 2013
- Stages: 5
- Distance: 918.7 km (570.9 mi)
- Winning time: 22h 01' 07"

Results
Jersey awarded to the overall winner	Winner	Edvald Boasson Hagen (NOR)	(Team Sky)
	Second	Sérgio Paulinho (POR)	(Saxo–Tinkoff)
	Third	Sondre Holst Enger (NOR)	(Team Plussbank)
Jersey awarded to the mountains classification winner	Mountains	Sander Cordeel (BEL)	(Lotto–Belisol)
Jersey awarded to the young rider classification winner	Young rider	Sondre Holst Enger (NOR)	(Team Plussbank)
Jersey awarded to the sprints classification winner	Sprints	Edvald Boasson Hagen (NOR)	(Team Sky)
	Team	IAM Cycling	

The 2013 Glava Tour of Norway was the third edition of the Glava Tour of Norway road cycling race. It was held over a period of five days between 15 and 19 May 2013. The race was a part of the 2013 UCI Europe Tour with a race classification of 2.1. Top Norwegian cyclists competing in the race included Edvald Boasson Hagen, Lars Petter Nordhaug, and Alexander Kristoff, with the notable exception of Thor Hushovd, who raced in the 2013 Tour of California instead.

Edvald Boasson Hagen won the race overall as well as the Nordialog super sprint classification. Portuguese rider Sérgio Paulinho came in second overall. Norwegian Sondre Holst Enger took third place as well as the Škoda young riders classification (U26). Belgian Sander Cordeel earned the Infotjenester King of the Mountains title, and the winner of the team classification was IAM Cycling. The race was completed in 22h 01' 07" at an average speed of 41.72 kilometres per hour (25.92 mph).

== Schedule ==
Stage	Start	Finish	Distance	Date	Winner	Time
1	Fredrikstad	Sarpsborg	190.3 km	Wednesday, 15 May	Alexander Kristoff (NOR)	4h 41' 59"
2	Kongsberg	Skien	179.0 km	Thursday, 16 May	Alexander Kristoff (NOR)	4h 11' 12"
3	Tønsberg	Drammen	162.7 km	Friday, 17 May	Theo Bos (NED)	4h 02' 22"
4	Brumunddal	Lillehammer	195.0 km	Saturday, 18 May	Edvald Boasson Hagen (NOR)	5h 01' 31"
5	Gjøvik	Hønefoss	172.9 km	Sunday, 19 May	Alexander Kristoff (NOR)	4h 04' 29"

== Teams ==
Twenty teams were invited to compete in the 2013 Glava Tour of Norway: 5 teams from the UCI ProTeams, 7 UCI Professional Continental Teams and 8 UCI Continental Teams.

UCI ProTeams
- (Netherlands) Blanco Pro Cycling
- (Belgium) Lotto–Belisol
- (Russia) Team Katusha
- (Denmark) Saxo–Tinkoff
- (United Kingdom) Team Sky
UCI Professional Continental Teams
- (Belgium) Accent Jobs–Wanty
- (France) Bretagne–Séché Environnement
- (Spain) Caja Rural–Seguros RGA
- (Switzerland) IAM Cycling
- (South Africa) MTN–Qhubeka
- (France) Sojasun
- (Belgium) Topsport Vlaanderen–Baloise
UCI Continental Teams
- (Netherlands) Cycling Team De Rijke–Shanks
- (Denmark) Team Cult Energy
- (Norway) Joker–Merida
- (Norway) Team Øster Hus-Ridley
- (Sweden) Team People4you-Unaas Cycling
- (Norway) Team Plussbank
- (Latvia) Rietumu-Delfin
- (Norway) Ringeriks-Kraft Look

== Stages ==
=== Stage 1 ===
15 May 2013 – Fredrikstad to Sarpsborg, 190.3 km (118.2 mi)

The first stage began with 6.6 km (4.1 mi) of neutral zone through Fredrikstad, then the race began in earnest in Ørebekk to the north of Gressvik. The ride then took a mostly-flat clockwise route through Østfold and finished with three laps in Sarpsborg city center. Alexander Kristoff beat fellow Norwegian national rider Edvald Boasson Hagen in a sprint finish, and French rider Sébastien Hinault took third. Spanish rider Amets Txurruka won the King of the Mountains title for the climb up to Fredriksten Fortress, Italian Kristian Sbaragli took the young riders classification, and Alexander Kristoff earned the sprinting title in addition to his stage win. The finishing time was 4h 41' 59", giving an average speed of 40.49 kilometres per hour (25.16 mph).

Stage 1 Result

	Rider	Team	Time
1	Alexander Kristoff (NOR)	Team Katusha	4h 41' 59"
2	Edvald Boasson Hagen (NOR)	Team Sky	s.t.
3	Sébastien Hinault (FRA)	IAM Cycling	s.t.
4	Theo Bos (NED)	Blanco Pro Cycling	s.t.
5	Kristian Sbaragli (ITA)	MTN–Qhubeka	s.t.
6	Tom Van Asbroeck (BEL)	Topsport Vlaanderen–Baloise	s.t.
7	Jean-Pierre Drucker (LUX)	Accent Jobs–Wanty	s.t.
8	Sven Vandousselaere (BEL)	Topsport Vlaanderen–Baloise	s.t.
9	Francesco Lasca (ITA)	Caja Rural–Seguros RGA	s.t.
10	Evaldas Šiškevičius (LTU)	Sojasun	s.t.

General Classification after Stage 1

	Rider	Team	Time
1	Alexander Kristoff (NOR)	Team Katusha	4h 41' 49"
2	Edvald Boasson Hagen (NOR)	Team Sky	+ 4"
3	Sébastien Hinault (FRA)	IAM Cycling	+ 6"
4	Amets Txurruka (ESP)	Caja Rural–Seguros RGA	+ 8"
5	Theo Bos (NED)	Blanco Pro Cycling	+ 10"
6	Kristian Sbaragli (ITA)	MTN–Qhubeka	+ 10"
7	Tom Van Asbroeck (BEL)	Topsport Vlaanderen–Baloise	+ 10"
8	Jean-Pierre Drucker (LUX)	Accent Jobs–Wanty	+ 10"
9	Sven Vandousselaere (BEL)	Topsport Vlaanderen–Baloise	+ 10"
10	Francesco Lasca (ITA)	Caja Rural–Seguros RGA	+ 10"

=== Stage 2 ===
16 May 2013 – Kongsberg to Skien, 167.8 km (104.3 mi)

The second stage began with the riders going west from Kongsberg until they reached Gransherad, northwest of Notodden, at which point they turned southeast towards Skien to complete the final three laps in town. The ride was marred by poor weather conditions—slippery roads, continuous rain, and sub-10°C temperatures, and as a result the last lap was cancelled, shortening the stage to 167.8 kilometres (104.3 mi). Alexander Kristoff once again beat Edvald Boasson Hagen on the final sprint, maintaining his sprint and overall lead, and fellow Norwegian Sondre Holst Enger took third in the stage as well as the young riders classification. Belgian rider Sander Cordeel was first on both mountain sections of the race and took the King of the Mountains classification. The finishing time was 4h 11' 12", giving an average speed of 40.08 km/h (24.90 mph).

Stage 2 Result

	Rider	Team	Time
1	Alexander Kristoff (NOR)	Team Katusha	4h 11' 12"
2	Edvald Boasson Hagen (NOR)	Team Sky	s.t.
3	Sondre Holst Enger (NOR)	Team Plussbank	s.t.
4	Evaldas Šiškevičius (LIT)	Sojasun	s.t.
5	Sven Vandousselaere (BEL)	Topsport Vlaanderen–Baloise	s.t.
6	Marko Kump (SVN)	Saxo–Tinkoff	s.t.
7	Tom Van Asbroeck (BEL)	Topsport Vlaanderen–Baloise	s.t.
8	Andreas Stauff (GER)	MTN–Qhubeka	s.t.
9	Matteo Pelucchi (ITA)	IAM Cycling	s.t.
10	Fréderique Robert (BEL)	Lotto–Belisol	s.t.

General Classification after Stage 2

	Rider	Team	Time
1	Alexander Kristoff (NOR)	Team Katusha	8h 52' 51"
2	Edvald Boasson Hagen (NOR)	Team Sky	+ 8"
3	Michael Reihs (DEN)	Team Cult Energy	+ 15"
4	Sébastien Hinault (FRA)	IAM Cycling	+ 16"
5	Sondre Holst Enger (NOR)	Team Plussbank	+ 16"
6	Laurens De Vreese (BEL)	Topsport Vlaanderen–Baloise	+ 17"
7	Sven Vandousselaere (BEL)	Topsport Vlaanderen–Baloise	+ 20"
8	Tom Van Asbroeck (BEL)	Topsport Vlaanderen–Baloise	+ 20"
9	Evaldas Šiškevičius (LTU)	Sojasun	+ 20"
10	Jean-Pierre Drucker (LUX)	Accent Jobs–Wanty	+ 20"

=== Stage 3 ===
17 May 2013 – Tønsberg to Drammen, 192.7 km (119.7 mi)

The third stage was a twisty ride north along the Oslofjord from Tønsberg to Drammen, finishing with five final circuits in the city. The race was on the same day as Norwegian Constitution Day, so there was a large turnout of spectators in traditional Norwegian bunader. Because of the cancelled laps the previous day, the stage was extended by a few laps to give a new distance of 192.7 km (119.7 mi) overall. Edvald Boasson Hagen was strongly positioned in the final lap, pulled forward by his team (Team Sky), but in the final sprint he was passed by several riders and received fourth in the stage. Dutch rider Theo Bos took first, followed closely by Alexander Kristoff, who retained his position as first place in sprinting and overall, and Italian rider Matteo Pelucchi, who took third. Sven Erik Bystrøm took the young riders classification from fellow countryman Sondre Holst Enger, while Sander Cordeel held on to his title as King of the Mountains. The finishing time was 4h 02' 22", giving an average speed of 47.7 km/h (29.6 mph).

Stage 3 Result

	Rider	Team	Time
1	Theo Bos (NED)	Blanco Pro Cycling	4h 02' 22"
2	Alexander Kristoff (NOR)	Team Katusha	s.t.
3	Matteo Pelucchi (ITA)	IAM Cycling	s.t.
4	Edvald Boasson Hagen (NOR)	Team Sky	s.t.
5	Sven Vandousselaere (BEL)	Topsport Vlaanderen–Baloise	s.t.
6	Tom Van Asbroeck (BEL)	Topsport Vlaanderen–Baloise	s.t.
7	Sondre Holst Enger (NOR)	Team Plussbank	s.t.
8	Christian Bertilsson (SWE)	Team People4you-Unaas Cycling	s.t.
9	Evaldas Šiškevičius (LTU)	Sojasun	s.t.
10	Takashi Miyazawa (JPN)	Saxo–Tinkoff	s.t.

General Classification after Stage 3

	Rider	Team	Time
1	Alexander Kristoff (NOR)	Team Katusha	12h 55' 07"
2	Edvald Boasson Hagen (NOR)	Team Sky	+ 14"
3	Sven Erik Bystrøm (NOR)	Team Øster Hus-Ridley	+ 20"
4	Michael Reihs (DEN)	Team Cult Energy	+ 21"
5	Sondre Holst Enger (NOR)	Team Plussbank	+ 22"
6	Sébastien Hinault (FRA)	IAM Cycling	+ 22"
7	Matteo Pelucchi (ITA)	IAM Cycling	+ 22"
8	Laurens De Vreese (BEL)	Topsport Vlaanderen–Baloise	+ 23"
9	Tim Wellens (BEL)	Lotto–Belisol	+ 24"
10	Sven Vandousselaere (BEL)	Topsport Vlaanderen–Baloise	+ 26"

=== Stage 4 ===
18 May 2013 – Brumunddal to Lillehammer, 195 km (121 mi)

The fourth stage was the longest and also the hilliest stage in the tour, with a total climb of about 3,550 m (11,650 ft) between Brumunddal and Lillehammer. Edvald Boasson Hagen was considered to have a home advantage since he was raised in Rudsbygd near Lillehammer and had done the climbs there many times. Boasson Hagen was part of a group that split early on and maintained their lead throughout the race, with the yellow-jerseyed Alexander Kristoff among the peloton left behind. On the final climb of the ride, with about 30 km (19 mi) remaining, Portuguese rider Sérgio Paulinho made a break from the group, and Boasson Hagen caught up with him before the summit. The two men worked together to maintain their lead until the final lap, when Boasson Hagen broke away from Paulinho and secured a decisive victory, taking the lead from Alexander Kristoff in both the sprint and overall classifications. Paulinho came second and Dutch rider Bauke Mollema took third. Sondre Holst Enger came fourth and retook the young rider classification from Sven Erik Bystrøm, and Sander Cordeel maintained his King of the Mountains title for the third stage in a row. The finishing time was 5h 01' 31", giving an average speed of 38.8 km/h (24.1 mph).

Stage 4 Result

	Rider	Team	Time
1	Edvald Boasson Hagen (NOR)	Team Sky	5h 01' 31"
2	Sérgio Paulinho (POR)	Saxo–Tinkoff	+ 11"
3	Bauke Mollema (NED)	Blanco Pro Cycling	+ 29"
4	Sondre Holst Enger (NOR)	Team Plussbank	+ 29"
5	Sébastien Reichenbach (SUI)	IAM Cycling	+ 29"
6	Toms Skujiņš (LAT)	Rietumu-Delfin	+ 29"
7	Gaëtan Bille (BEL)	Lotto–Belisol	+ 29"
8	Johann Tschopp (SUI)	IAM Cycling	+ 29"
9	Reto Hollenstein (SUI)	IAM Cycling	+ 29"
10	André Cardoso (POR)	Caja Rural–Seguros RGA	+ 29"

General Classification after Stage 4

	Rider	Team	Time
1	Edvald Boasson Hagen (NOR)	Team Sky	17h 56' 42"
2	Sérgio Paulinho (POR)	Saxo–Tinkoff	+ 27"
3	Bauke Mollema (NED)	Blanco Pro Cycling	+ 44"
4	Sondre Holst Enger (NOR)	Team Plussbank	+ 47"
5	Gaëtan Bille (BEL)	Lotto–Belisol	+ 49"
6	André Cardoso (POR)	Caja Rural–Seguros RGA	+ 50"
7	Jesper Hansen (DEN)	Team Cult Energy	+ 51"
8	Laurens ten Dam (NED)	Blanco Pro Cycling	+ 51"
9	Johann Tschopp (SUI)	IAM Cycling	+ 51"
10	Toms Skujiņš (LAT)	Rietumu-Delfin	+ 1' 26"

=== Stage 5 ===
19 May 2013 – Gjøvik to Hønefoss, 172.9 km (107.4 mi)

The fifth and final stage was a race south from Gjøvik ending with four long and hilly circuits in Hønefoss. Lars Petter Nordhaug broke away in the final 12 km (7.5 mi) and was joined by Jesper Hansen and Fredrik Ludvigsson, but the group eventually got engulfed by the main peloton in a push led by Team Sky. Alexander Kristoff came in first and received his third stage win of the competition. Next came Team Plussbank rider Sondre Holst Enger, who retained the top spot in the young riders classification and placed third overall, and then Edvald Boasson Hagen in third, securing a sprint classification and general classification victory for the second consecutive year in the Tour of Norway. Sérgio Paulinho came in second overall and Sander Cordeel took the King of Mountains title. The finishing time was 4h 04' 29", giving an average speed of 42.42 km/h (26.36 mph).

Stage 5 Result

	Rider	Team	Time
1	Alexander Kristoff (NOR)	Team Katusha	4h 04' 29"
2	Sondre Holst Enger (NOR)	Team Plussbank	s.t.
3	Edvald Boasson Hagen (NOR)	Team Sky	s.t.
4	Jean-Pierre Drucker (LUX)	Accent Jobs–Wanty	s.t.
5	Tom Van Asbroeck (BEL)	Topsport Vlaanderen–Baloise	s.t.
6	Stefan van Dijk (NED)	Accent Jobs–Wanty	s.t.
7	Sébastien Hinault (FRA)	IAM Cycling	s.t.
8	Evaldas Šiškevičius (LTU)	Sojasun	s.t.
9	Lars Boom (NED)	Blanco Pro Cycling	s.t.
10	Reto Hollenstein (SUI)	IAM Cycling	s.t.

Final General Classification

	Rider	Team	Time
1	Edvald Boasson Hagen (NOR)	Team Sky	22h 01' 07"
2	Sérgio Paulinho (POR)	Saxo–Tinkoff	+ 31"
3	Sondre Holst Enger (NOR)	Team Plussbank	+ 45"
4	Bauke Mollema (NED)	Blanco Pro Cycling	+ 48"
5	Gaëtan Bille (BEL)	Lotto–Belisol	+ 53"
6	André Cardoso (POR)	Caja Rural–Seguros RGA	+ 54"
7	Jesper Hansen (DEN)	Team Cult Energy	+ 55"
8	Laurens ten Dam (NED)	Blanco Pro Cycling	+ 55"
9	Johann Tschopp (SUI)	IAM Cycling	+ 55"
10	Toms Skujiņš (LAT)	Rietumu-Delfin	+ 1' 52"

== Classification leadership table ==
Stage	Stage winner	General Classification	Nordialog super sprint	Infotjenester King of the Mountains	Škoda young riders classification (U26)	Team classification
1	Alexander Kristoff	Alexander Kristoff	Alexander Kristoff	Amets Txurruka	Kristian Sbaragli	Topsport Vlaanderen–Baloise
2	Alexander Kristoff	Alexander Kristoff	Alexander Kristoff	Sander Cordeel	Sondre Holst Enger	Topsport Vlaanderen–Baloise
3	Theo Bos	Alexander Kristoff	Alexander Kristoff	Sander Cordeel	Sven Erik Bystrøm	Topsport Vlaanderen–Baloise
4	Edvald Boasson Hagen	Edvald Boasson Hagen	Edvald Boasson Hagen	Sander Cordeel	Sondre Holst Enger	IAM Cycling
5	Alexander Kristoff	Edvald Boasson Hagen	Edvald Boasson Hagen	Sander Cordeel	Sondre Holst Enger	IAM Cycling
Final		Edvald Boasson Hagen	Edvald Boasson Hagen	Sander Cordeel	Sondre Holst Enger	IAM Cycling

== Final standings ==
=== General classification ===
	Rider	Team	Time
1	Edvald Boasson Hagen (NOR)	Team Sky	22h 01' 07"
2	Sérgio Paulinho (POR)	Saxo–Tinkoff	+ 31"
3	Sondre Holst Enger (NOR)	Team Plussbank	+ 45"
4	Bauke Mollema (NED)	Blanco Pro Cycling	+ 48"
5	Gaëtan Bille (BEL)	Lotto–Belisol	+ 53"
6	André Cardoso (POR)	Caja Rural–Seguros RGA	+ 54"
7	Jesper Hansen (DEN)	Team Cult Energy	+ 55"
8	Laurens ten Dam (NED)	Blanco Pro Cycling	+ 55"
9	Johann Tschopp (SUI)	IAM Cycling	+ 55"
10	Toms Skujiņš (LAT)	Rietumu-Delfin	+ 1' 52"

=== Sprint classification ===
	Rider	Team	Points
1	Edvald Boasson Hagen (NOR)	Team Sky	68
2	Alexander Kristoff (NOR)	Team Katusha	60
3	Sondre Holst Enger (NOR)	Team Plussbank	48
4	Tom Van Asbroeck (BEL)	Topsport Vlaanderen–Baloise	40
5	Evaldas Šiškevičius (LTU)	Sojasun	33
6	Theo Bos (NED)	Blanco Pro Cycling	27
7	Sébastien Hinault (FRA)	IAM Cycling	26
8	Jean-Pierre Drucker (LUX)	Accent Jobs–Wanty	22
9	Bauke Mollema (NED)	Blanco Pro Cycling	20
10	Matteo Pelucchi (ITA)	IAM Cycling	20

=== Mountains classification ===
	Rider	Team	Points
1	Sander Cordeel (BEL)	Lotto–Belisol	16
2	Danail Petrov (BUL)	Caja Rural–Seguros RGA	8
3	Amets Txurruka (ESP)	Caja Rural–Seguros RGA	6
4	Tim Wellens (BEL)	Lotto–Belisol	4
5	Laurens De Vreese (BEL)	Topsport Vlaanderen–Baloise	3
6	Filip Eidsheim (NOR)	Team Øster Hus-Ridley	3
7	Rémi Pauriol (FRA)	Sojasun	2
8	Bjørn Tore Nilsen Hoem (NOR)	Team Plussbank	2
9	Rüdiger Selig (GER)	Team Katusha	2
10	Vegard Robinson Bugge (NOR)	Joker–Merida	2

=== Young riders classification ===
	Rider	Team	Time
1	Sondre Holst Enger (NOR)	Team Plussbank	22h 01' 52"
2	Gaëtan Bille (BEL)	Lotto–Belisol	+ 8"
3	Jesper Hansen (DEN)	Team Cult Energy	+ 10"
4	Toms Skujiņš (LAT)	Rietumu-Delfin	+ 1' 07"
5	Anthony Delaplace (FRA)	Sojasun	+ 1' 10"
6	Sébastien Reichenbach (SUI)	IAM Cycling	+ 1' 10"
7	Fredrik Ludvigsson (SWE)	Team People4you-Unaas Cycling	+ 1' 53"
8	Vegard Stake Laengen (NOR)	Bretagne–Séché Environnement	+ 1' 53"
9	Louis Meintjes (RSA)	MTN–Qhubeka	+ 4' 37"
10	Eduardo Sepúlveda (ARG)	Bretagne–Séché Environnement	+ 7' 18"

=== Team classification ===
	Team	Points
1	(Switzerland) IAM Cycling	66h 06' 06"
2	(Spain) Caja Rural–Seguros RGA	+ 5' 02"
3	(Netherlands) Blanco Pro Cycling	+ 6' 51"
4	(United Kingdom) Team Sky	+ 13' 02"
5	(South Africa) MTN–Qhubeka	+ 14' 22"
6	(France) Bretagne–Séché Environnement	+ 16' 55"
7	(Russia) Team Katusha	+ 17' 22"
8	(Norway) Team Plussbank	+ 18' 08"
9	(France) Sojasun	+ 18' 39"
10	(Belgium) Topsport Vlaanderen–Baloise	+ 22' 25"
