= Sondre Holst Enger =

Norwegian cyclist (born 1993)

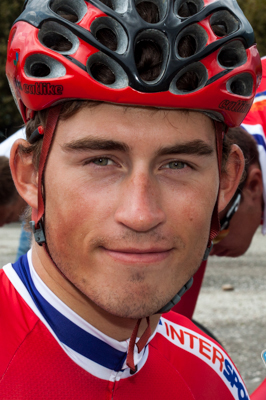
- Holst Enger in 2013

Personal information
- Full name: Sondre Holst Enger
- Nickname: The Norvegian Viking
- Born: 17 December 1993 (age 32) Horten, Norway
- Height: 1.71 m (5 ft 7 in)
- Weight: 69 kg (152 lb)

Cycling career
- Sport: Cycling
- Current team: Retired
- Discipline: Road
- Role: Rider
- Rider type: Sprinter

Professional teams
- 2012–2014: Plussbank BMC
- 2014–2016: IAM Cycling
- 2017: AG2R La Mondiale
- 2018–2019: Israel Cycling Academy
- 2020: Riwal Readynez
Medal record
Representing Norway
Men's road bicycle racing
World Championships
Bronze medal – third place	2013 Tuscany	Under-23 road race

Sondre Holst Enger (born 17 December 1993) is a Norwegian former professional cyclist, who rode professionally between 2012 and 2020 for five different teams. He was named in the start list for the 2016 Tour de France. Upon retiring, Holst Enger announced his intention to become a carpenter.

== Major results ==
2011
3rd Time trial, National Junior Road Championships
8th Road race, UEC European Junior Road Championships
10th Time trial, UCI Junior Road World Championships
10th Overall GP Denmark
2012
3rd Ringerike GP
2013
1st Road race, National Under-23 Road Championships
1st Overall Coupe des nations Ville Saguenay

1st Points classification

3rd Road race, UCI Road World Under-23 Championships
3rd Overall Tour of Norway

1st Young rider classification

3rd Ringerike GP
6th Hadeland GP
6th Skive–Løbet
2014
1st Road race, National Under-23 Road Championships
5th Road race, UCI Road World Under-23 Championships
5th Overall Tour des Fjords
8th Road race, UEC European Under-23 Road Championships
2015 (1 pro win)
1st Stage 1 Tour of Austria
2016 (1)
1st Stage 6 Tour of Croatia
2nd Overall Tour de Picardie
3rd Overall Tour of Norway

1st Points classification

4th Road race, National Road Championships
8th EuroEyes Cyclassics
2018
1st Points classification, Tour of Norway
2nd Trofeo Porreres–Felanitx–Ses Salines–Campos
3rd Veenendaal–Veenendaal Classic

=== Grand Tour general classification results timeline ===
Grand Tour	2016
Giro d'Italia	—
Tour de France	141
Vuelta a España	—

Legend
—	Did not compete
DNF	Did not finish
