= 2016 Tour of Norway =

2016 UCI Europe Tour
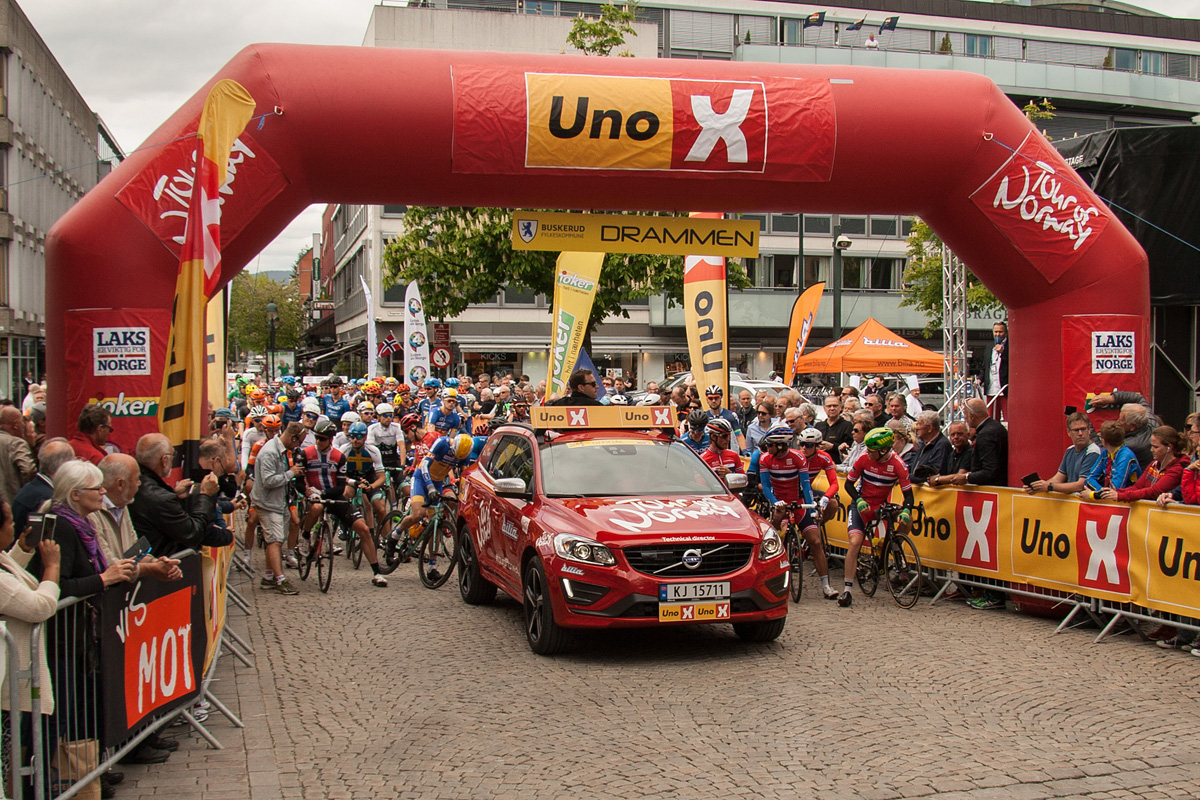
- The start of the first stage

Race details
- Dates: 18–22 May 2016
- Stages: 5
- Distance: 888.5 km (552.1 mi)

Results
Jersey awarded to the overall winner	Winner	Pieter Weening (NED)	(Roompot–Oranje Peloton)
	Second	Edvald Boasson Hagen (NOR)	(Team Qhubeka NextHash)
	Third	Sondre Holst Enger (NOR)	(IAM Cycling)
Jersey awarded to the points classification winner	Points	Sondre Holst Enger (NOR)	(IAM Cycling)
Jersey awarded to the mountains classification winner	Mountains	Mads Pedersen (DEN)	(Stölting Service Group)
Jersey awarded to the young rider classification winner	Young rider	Odd Christian Eiking (NOR)	(Groupama–FDJ United)
	Team	Norway U23 (national team)	

The 6th edition of the Tour of Norway road cycling race took place from 18 to 22 May 2016. The race was part of UCI Europe Tour in category 2.HC.

== Route ==
Stage characteristics and winners
Stage	Date	Course	Distance	Type	Stage winner
1	18 May	Drammen to Langesund	172.4 km (107.1 mi)	Flat stage	Steele Von Hoff (AUS)
2	19 May	Kragerø to Rjukan	211.2 km (131.2 mi)	Mountain stage	Pieter Weening (NED)
3	20 May	Rjukan to Geilo	168 km (104 mi)	Mountain stage	Mads Pedersen (DEN)
4	21 May	Flå to Hønefoss Airport	173.2 km (107.6 mi)	Medium mountain stage	Edvald Boasson Hagen (NOR)
5	22 May	Drøbak to Sarpsborg	163.2 km (101.4 mi)	Flat stage	Edvald Boasson Hagen (NOR)

== Classification leadership ==
Stage	Stage leader	General Classification	Points Classification	Mountains Classification	Youth Classification	Team Classification
1	Steele Von Hoff	Steele Von Hoff	Steele Von Hoff	Håvard Blikra	Phil Bauhaus	Team Joker-Byggtorget
2	Pieter Weening	Pieter Weening	Steele Von Hoff	Pieter Weening	Odd Christian Eiking	Roompot–Oranje Peloton
3	Mads Pedersen	Pieter Weening	Pieter Weening	Mads Pedersen	Odd Christian Eiking	Norway
4	Edvald Boasson Hagen	Pieter Weening	Sondre Holst Enger	Mads Pedersen	Odd Christian Eiking	Norway
5	Edvald Boasson Hagen	Pieter Weening	Sondre Holst Enger	Mads Pedersen	Odd Christian Eiking	Norway
Overall Winner		Pieter Weening	Sondre Holst Enger	Mads Pedersen	Odd Christian Eiking	Norway

== Final standings ==
Legend
General classification	Denotes the leader of the General classification	Points classification	Denotes the leader of the Points classification
Mountains classification	Denotes the leader of the Mountains classification	Young rider classification	Denotes the leader of the Young rider classification

=== General classification ===
	Rider	Team	Time
1	Pieter Weening (NED)	Roompot–Oranje Peloton	22h 17' 20"
2	Edvald Boasson Hagen (NOR)	Team Dimension Data	+ 23"
3	Sondre Holst Enger (NOR)	Norway (national)	+ 33"
4	Odd Christian Eiking (NOR)	Norway (national)	+ 55"
5	Sander Armée (BEL)	Lotto–Soudal	+ 57"
6	José Mendes (POR)	Bora–Argon 18	+ 59"
7	Marco Minnaard (NED)	Wanty–Groupe Gobert	+ 1' 02"
8	Eliot Lietaer (BEL)	Topsport Vlaanderen–Baloise	+ 1' 19"
9	Pello Bilbao (ESP)	Caja Rural–Seguros RGA	+ 1' 30"
10	August Jensen (NOR)	Team Coop–Øster Hus	+ 1' 31"

=== Points classification ===
	Rider	Team	Points
1	Sondre Holst Enger (NOR)	Norway (national)	55
2	Edvald Boasson Hagen (NOR)	Team Dimension Data	53
3	Odd Christian Eiking (NOR)	Norway (national)	36
4	Pieter Weening (NED)	Roompot–Oranje Peloton	32
5	Lluís Mas (ESP)	Caja Rural–Seguros RGA	32
6	Sander Armée (BEL)	Lotto–Soudal	30
7	Marco Minnaard (NED)	Wanty–Groupe Gobert	30
8	Tosh Van der Sande (BEL)	Lotto–Soudal	24
9	August Jensen (NOR)	Team Coop–Øster Hus	22
10	José Mendes (POR)	Bora–Argon 18	20

=== Mountains classification ===
	Rider	Team	Points
1	Mads Pedersen (DEN)	Stölting Service Group	30
2	Lluís Mas (ESP)	Caja Rural–Seguros RGA	26
3	Håvard Blikra (NOR)	Team Coop–Øster Hus	23
4	Lukas Pöstlberger (AUT)	Bora–Argon 18	17
5	Pieter Weening (NED)	Roompot–Oranje Peloton	13
6	Cesare Benedetti (ITA)	Bora–Argon 18	11
7	Sander Armée (BEL)	Lotto–Soudal	11
8	Trond Trondsen (NOR)	Team Sparebanken Sør	9
9	Odd Christian Eiking (NOR)	Norway (national)	8
10	Øivind Lukkedahl (NOR)	Team Coop–Øster Hus	8

=== Young riders classification (U23) ===
	Rider	Team	Time
1	Odd Christian Eiking (NOR)	Norway (national)	22h 18' 15"
2	Markus Hoelgaard (NOR)	Team Joker Byggtorget	+ 52"
3	Lennard Kämna (GER)	Stölting Service Group	+ 3' 15"
4	Anders Skaarseth (NOR)	Team Joker Byggtorget	+ 3' 53"
5	Øivind Lukkedahl (NOR)	Team Coop–Øster Hus	+ 4' 04"
6	Jonas Abrahamsen (NOR)	Team Ringeriks–Kraft	+ 5' 10"
7	Lucas Eriksson (SWE)	Team Tre Berg–Bianchi	+ 7' 46"
8	Dries Van Gestel (BEL)	Topsport Vlaanderen–Baloise	+ 16' 38"
9	Marcus Fåglum (SWE)	Team Tre Berg–Bianchi	+ 16' 48"
10	Mads Pedersen (DEN)	Stölting Service Group	+ 18' 17"

=== Team classification ===
	Team	Time
1	Androni Giocattoli–Sidermec	45h 40' 44"
2	Bora–Argon 18	+ 2' 51"
3	Norda–MG.K Vis Vega	+ 8' 26"
4	Topsport Vlaanderen–Baloise	+ 9' 39"
5	Team Katusha	+ 11' 12"
6	Adria Mobil	+ 12' 55"
7	Bardiani–CSF	+ 14' 05"
8	Tinkoff	+ 14' 34"
9	Amplatz–BMC	+ 20' 27"
10	Lampre–Merida	+ 24' 57"
