= Ivan Santaromita =

Italian road bicycle racer

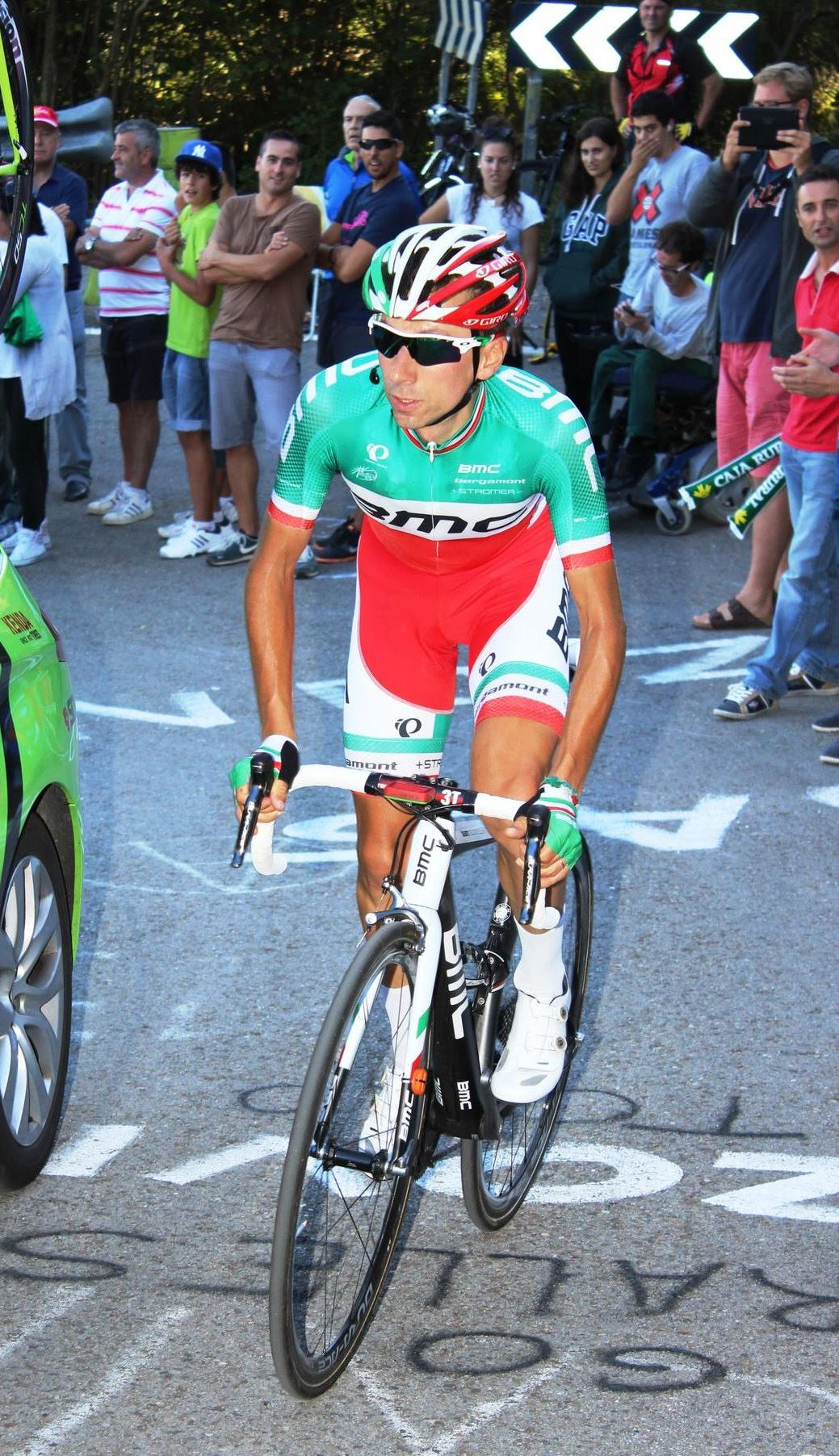
- Santaromita at the 2013 Vuelta a España.

Personal information
- Full name: Ivan Santaromita
- Born: 30 April 1984 (age 42) Varese, Italy
- Height: 176 cm (5 ft 9 in)
- Weight: 58 kg (128 lb)

Cycling career
- Sport: Cycling
- Discipline: Road
- Role: Rider
- Rider type: Climber

Amateur team
- 2003–2005: VC Mendrisio

Professional teams
- 2005: → Quick-Step–Innergetic (stagiaire)
- 2006–2007: Quick-Step–Innergetic
- 2008–2010: Liquigas
- 2011–2013: BMC Racing Team
- 2014–2015: Orica–GreenEDGE
- 2016: Skydive Dubai–Al Ahli
- 2017–2019: Nippo–Vini Fantini

Major wins
- Grand Tours Giro d'Italia 1 TTT stage (2014) Single-day races National Road Race Championships (2013)

Ivan Santaromita (born 30 April 1984) is an Italian former professional road bicycle racer, who rode professionally between 2006 and 2019 for the Quick-Step–Innergetic, Liquigas–Doimo, BMC Racing Team, Orica–GreenEDGE, Skydive Dubai–Al Ahli and Nippo–Vini Fantini–Faizanè teams.

His brother Mauro-Antonio and nephew Alessandro are also professional cyclists.

== Career ==
Born in Varese, Santaromita turned professional with Quick-Step–Innergetic in 2006 before moving to Liquigas in 2008. In 2010, he took his first significant victory as a professional in the Settimana Internazionale di Coppi e Bartali, dominating the stage race as he won it with more than a minute-and-a-half of an advantage over Przemysław Niemiec.

In 2013, Santaromita won the third stage of the Giro del Trentino. He approached the finish line with Michele Scarponi and Paolo Tiralongo, the trio being the remnants of an early breakaway. Santaromita outsprinted the pair to claim his first victory since 2010. Santaromita left the BMC Racing Team at the end of the 2013 season, and joined Orica–GreenEDGE for the 2014 season.

In 2014, Santaromita was the first rider to withdraw from the Vuelta a España on stage 7 after breaking a finger in a crash.

In 2015, he came in sixth position in the general classification of the Tour of Norway.

== Major results ==
2005
4th Piccolo Giro di Lombardia
2007
10th Overall Tour de Georgia
2008
1st Stage 1 (TTT) Vuelta a España
2009
3rd Japan Cup
2010
1st Overall Settimana Internazionale di Coppi e Bartali

1st Stage 1b (TTT)

2nd Road race, National Road Championships
5th Gran Premio dell'Insubria-Lugano
2012
1st Stage 1 (TTT) Giro del Trentino
2013
1st Road race, National Road Championships (Trofeo Melinda)
1st Stage 3 Giro del Trentino
5th Gran Premio della Costa Etruschi
9th Giro di Lombardia
2014
1st Stage 1 (TTT) Giro d'Italia
2015
5th Prueba Villafranca de Ordizia
6th Overall Tour of Norway
2016
7th Overall Tour de Langkawi
2017
8th Pro Ötztaler 5500
9th Overall Tour of Slovenia
9th Giro dell'Appennino
10th Overall Tour of Japan
2018
4th Road race, National Road Championships
5th Japan Cup

=== Grand Tour general classification results timeline ===
Grand Tour	2008	2009	2010	2011	2012	2013	2014	2015	2016	2017	2018	2019
Giro d'Italia	—	—	—	—	52	30	DNF	—	—	—	—	102
Tour de France	—	—	—	83	—	—	—	—	—	—	—	—
Vuelta a España	125	—	65	117	—	48	DNF	—	—	—	—	—

Legend
—	Did not compete
DNF	Did not finish
