= Andreas Vangstad =

Norwegian cyclist

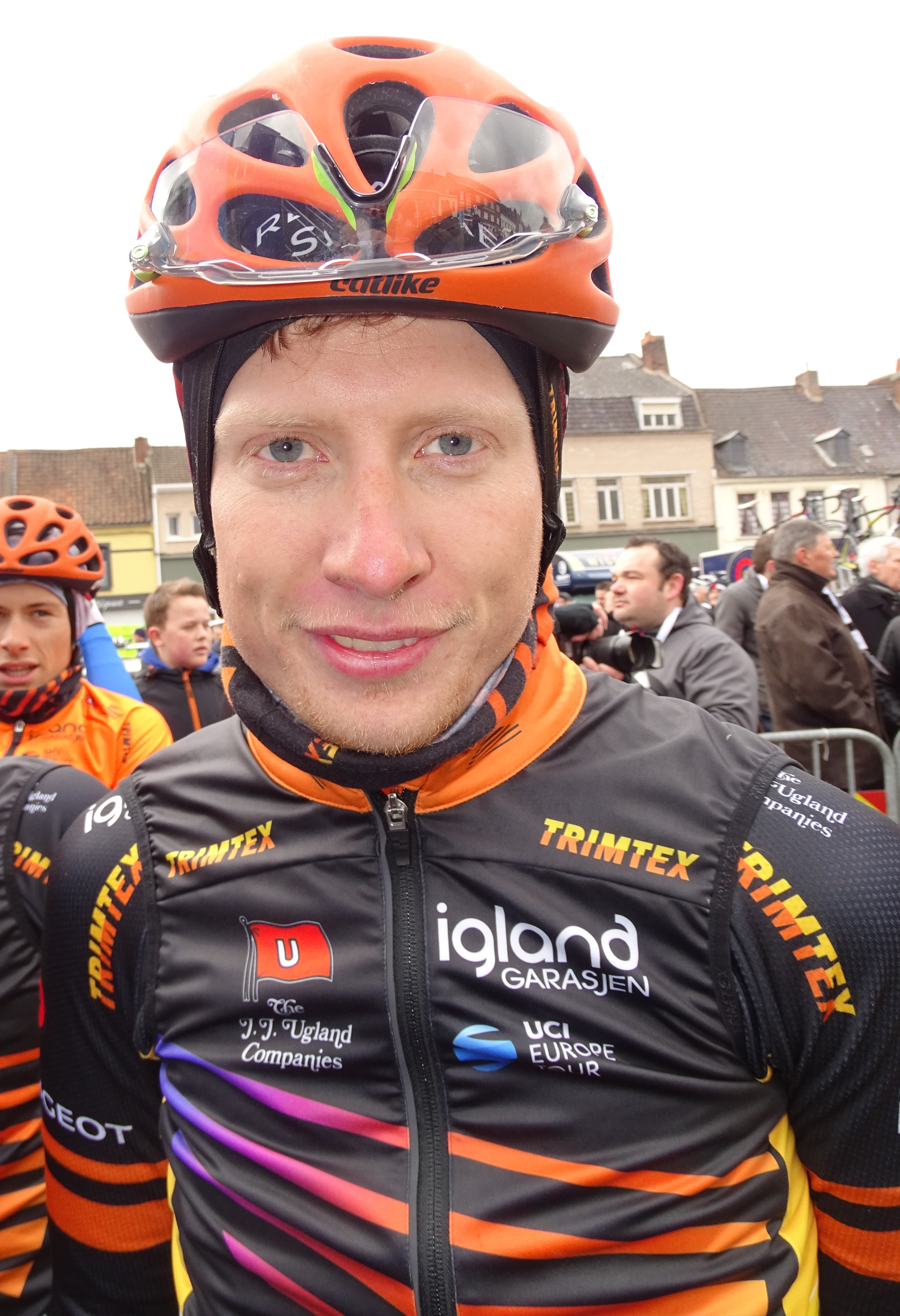
- Vangstad at the 2016 Grand Prix de la Ville de Lillers

Personal information
- Full name: Andreas Vangstad
- Born: 24 March 1992 (age 34) Kristiansand, Norway

Cycling career
- Sport: Cycling
- Current team: Retired
- Discipline: Road
- Role: Rider

Amateur teams
- 2013: Kristiansands CK
- 2013: Team Plussbank (stagiaire)

Professional teams
- 2014–2017: Team Sparebanken Sør
- 2018–2019: Joker Icopal

Andreas Vangstad (born 24 March 1992) is a Norwegian former professional cyclist, who rode professionally between 2014 and 2019 for the Team Sparebanken Sør and Joker Fuel of Norway teams. He was named in the startlist for the 2015 UCI World Time Trial Championships.

== Major results ==
2013
6th Time trial, National Road Championships
2014
National Road Championships

1st Under-23 time trial
3rd Time trial

7th Time trial, UCI Under-23 Road World Championships
2015
1st Fyen Rundt
2nd Time trial, National Road Championships
5th Overall Tour of Norway

1st Stage 5

2016
1st Sundvolden GP
3rd Time trial, National Road Championships
2017
1st Prologue Troféu Joaquim Agostinho
2nd Time trial, National Road Championships
3rd Clássica Aldeias do Xisto
3rd Clássica da Arrábida
4th Sundvolden GP
9th Overall Tour of Norway
10th Overall Tour des Fjords
2018
3rd Sundvolden GP
7th Time trial, National Road Championships
