= Maciej Paterski =

Polish road racing cyclist

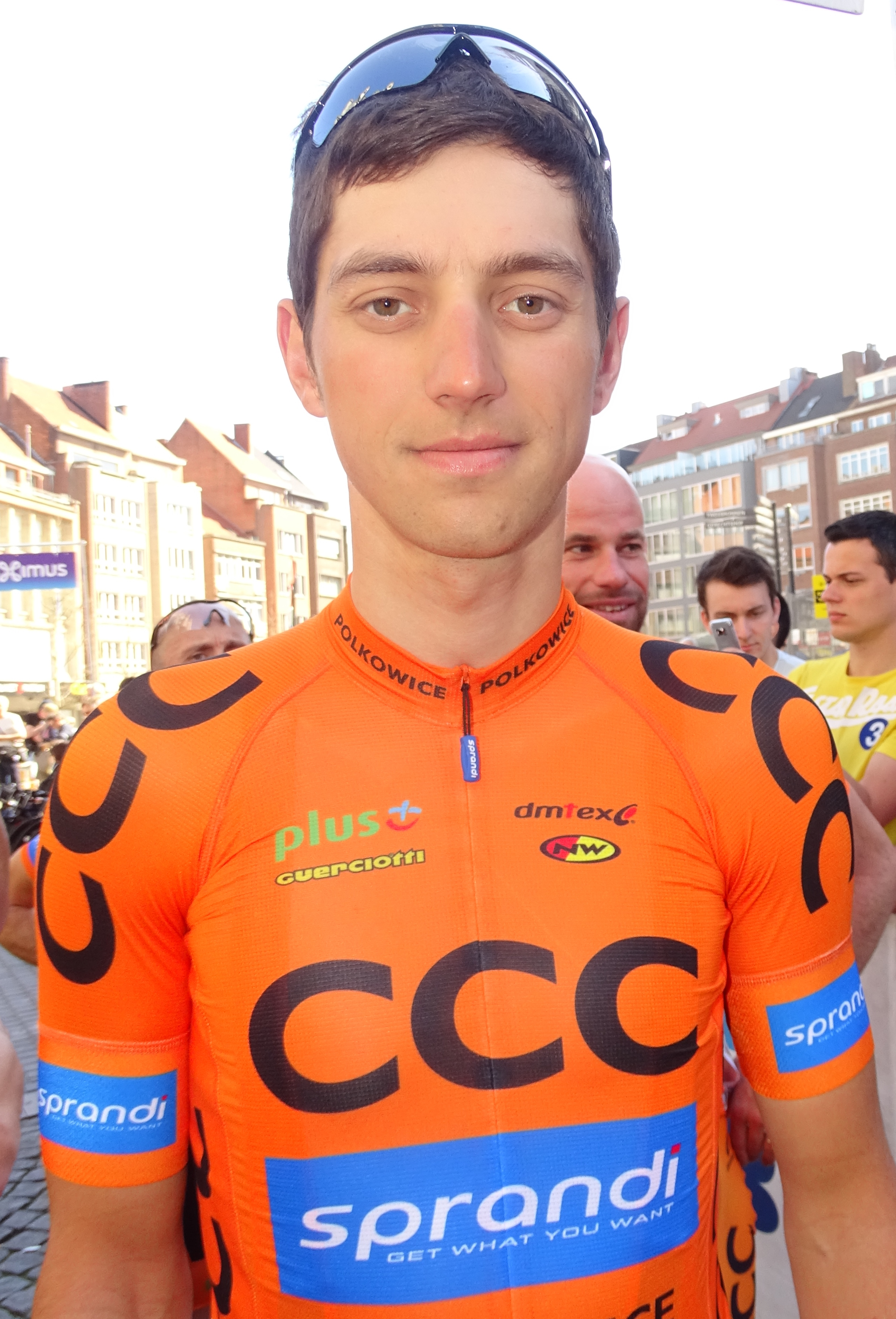
- Paterski at the 2015 Brabantse Pijl.

Personal information
- Full name: Maciej Paterski
- Born: 12 September 1986 (age 40) Kalisz, Poland
- Height: 1.86 m (6 ft 1 in)
- Weight: 73 kg (161 lb)

Cycling career
- Sport: Cycling
- Current team: Voster Team
- Discipline: Road
- Role: Rider
- Rider type: Puncheur

Amateur team
- 2009: Liquigas (stagiaire)

Professional teams
- 2010–2013: Liquigas–Doimo
- 2014–2017: CCC–Polsat–Polkowice
- 2018–2020: Wibatech Merx 7R
- 2021–: Voster ATS Team

Major wins
- Stage races Tour of Norway (2014) Tour of Croatia (2015) One-day races and Classics National Road Race Championships (2021)

Maciej Paterski (born 12 September 1986) is a Polish professional road bicycle racer, who currently rides for UCI Continental team Voster Team.

== Career ==
Born in Kalisz, Paterski left Cannondale at the end of the 2013 season, and joined CCC–Polsat–Polkowice for the 2014 season. He had quite a successful 2014 season, winning the Tour of Norway and the mountains classification in his native Tour de Pologne. Later that year, he also won the Memoriał Henryka Łasaka. He started the 2015 season in good form, placing 6th at the Vuelta a Murcia and winning the first stage of the Volta a Catalunya. He followed up these promising results with strong placings in some April classics such as the Amstel Gold Race. At the end of April, Paterski dominated the newly organized Tour of Croatia, winning the overall classification, the points classification and the mountains classification plus two stages. In August, he clinched the mountains classification in the Tour de Pologne for the second consecutive year. 2016 proved to be a comparatively lean year with Paterski scoring just one win, stage 6 at the Bałtyk–Karkonosze Tour where he finished second overall. Another highlight was a sixth place at the UCI World Tour event Bretagne Classic Ouest–France. 2017 was a much more successful season for Paterski with overall victories in the Tour of Małopolska, Szlakiem Walk Majora Hubala and the Coupe des Carpathes.

== Major results ==
2007
2nd Road race, National Under-23 Road Championships
2nd Grand Prix Bradlo
2008
1st Stage 5 Giro delle Regioni
1st Points classification Tour de l'Avenir
3rd Time trial, National Under-23 Road Championships
3rd Due Giorni Marchigiana
6th Trofeo Città di San Vendemiano
9th La Côte Picarde
10th Road race, UEC European Under-23 Road Championships
2009
2nd Coppa San Geo
5th Trofeo Franco Balestra
5th Trofeo Città di San Vendemiano
5th Trofeo Alcide Degasperi
6th Trofeo Zsšdi
2011
3rd Road race, National Road Championships
4th Giro del Friuli
5th Coppa Bernocchi
2013
3rd Gran Premio Industria e Commercio di Prato
2014
1st Overall Tour of Norway
1st Memoriał Henryka Łasaka
1st Stage 3a (TTT) Sibiu Cycling Tour
1st Mountains classification Tour de Pologne
8th Memorial Marco Pantani
9th Volta Limburg Classic
10th Gran Premio Industria e Commercio di Prato
2015
1st Overall Tour of Croatia

1st Points classification
1st Mountains classification
1st Stages 3 & 5

1st Stage 1 Volta a Catalunya
1st Mountains classification Tour de Pologne
2nd Volta Limburg Classic
6th Vuelta a Murcia
8th Coppa Ugo Agostoni
9th Brabantse Pijl
9th Amstel Gold Race
10th Velothon Stockholm
2016
2nd Overall Bałtyk–Karkonosze Tour

1st Stage 6

4th Overall Course de Solidarność et des Champions Olympiques
6th Bretagne Classic
7th Heistse Pijl
2017
1st Overall Tour of Małopolska

1st Stages 2 & 3

1st Overall Szlakiem Walk Majora Hubala

1st Stage 1

1st Coupe des Carpathes
3rd Korona Kocich Gór
7th Clásica de Almería
2018
1st National Hill Climb Championships
1st Raiffeisen Grand Prix
1st Minsk Cup
1st Coupe des Carpathes
Visegrad 4 Bicycle Race

1st Grand Prix Poland
1st GP Slovakia
2nd GP Czech Republic

1st Stage 1 Tour of Małopolska
2nd Overall Okolo Jižních Čech

1st Points classification

2nd Overall Course de Solidarność et des Champions Olympiques
8th Grand Prix Minsk
8th Grand Prix Doliny Baryczy Milicz
9th Overall Szlakiem Walk Majora Hubala
2019
1st Overall Szlakiem Walk Majora Hubala

1st Points classification
1st Stages 2b & 3

1st Raiffeisen Grand Prix
1st Stage 3 Circuit des Ardennes
2nd Overall Szlakiem Grodów Piastowskich

1st Points classification
1st Stages 2 & 3

2nd Grand Prix Poland, Visegrad 4 Bicycle Race
2nd Memoriał Andrzeja Trochanowskiego
4th Memoriał Romana Siemińskiego
5th Overall Tour of Estonia
5th Overall Tour du Loir-et-Cher
2020
1st Active rider classification Tour de Pologne
2nd Overall Bałtyk–Karkonosze Tour
5th Overall Course de Solidarność et des Champions Olympiques
7th Road race, UEC European Road Championships
2021
1st Road race, National Road Championships
1st Overall Szlakiem Grodów Piastowskich

1st Points classification
1st Stage 2

1st Mountains classification Tour de Hongrie
1st Mountains classification Tour of Romania
5th Overall Tour of Estonia
5th Overall Course de Solidarność et des Champions Olympiques
6th Overall Dookoła Mazowsza
7th PWZ Zuidenveld Tour
2022
1st Overall In the Steps of Romans

1st Stage 1

1st GP Adria Mobil
3rd Overall Tour of Szeklerland
6th Memoriał Andrzeja Trochanowskiego
8th Overall Tour of Bulgaria
2023
Visegrad 4 Bicycle Race

1st GP Slovakia
2nd GP Czech Republic
2nd Kerekparverseny
3rd GP Poland

1st Mountains classification, Tour of Małopolska

=== Grand Tour general classification results timeline ===
Grand Tour	2010	2011	2012	2013	2014	2015	2016	2017
Giro d'Italia	—	—	—	—	—	79	—	137
Tour de France	—	67	—	—	—	—	—	—
Vuelta a España	75	—	89	54	—	—	—	—

Legend
—	Did not compete
DNF	Did not finish
