= Mathias Skjold =

Norwegian cyclist

Personal information
- Born: 20 September 1996 (age 30)

Cycling career
- Sport: Cycling
- Current team: Team Sparebanken Sør
- Discipline: Road
- Role: Rider

Professional team
- 2017–: Team Sparebanken Sør

Mathias Skjold (born 20 September 1996) is a Norwegian racing cyclist. He competed in the men's team time trial event at the 2017 UCI Road World Championships.
