= Jo Kogstad Ringheim =

Norwegian bicycle racer

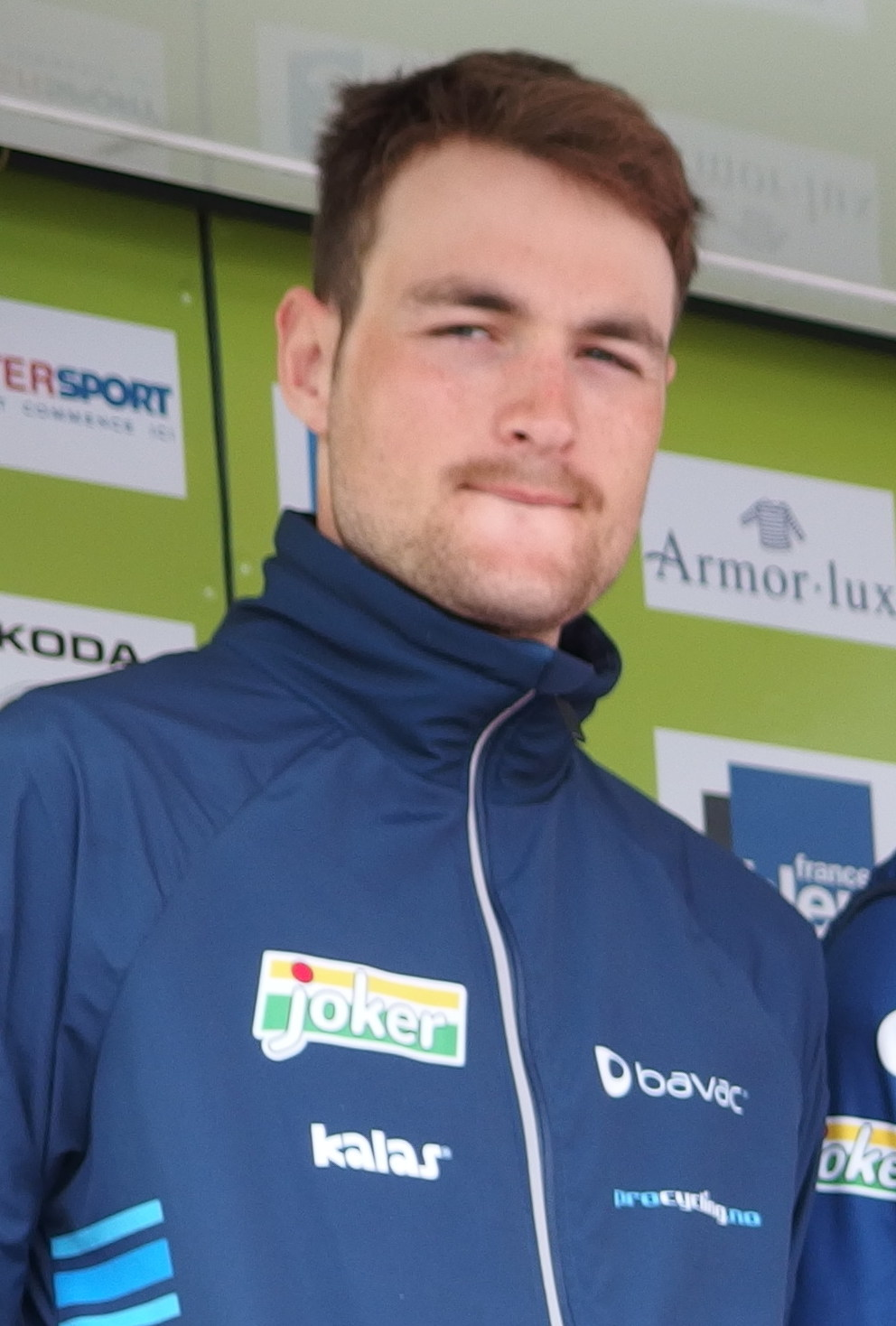
- Ringheim in 2014

Personal information
- Born: 16 February 1991 (age 35)

Cycling career
- Sport: Cycling
- Current team: Retired
- Discipline: Road
- Role: Rider

Professional teams
- 2013: Team People4you–Unaas Cycling
- 2014: Team Joker

Jo Kogstad Ringheim (born 16 February 1991) is a Norwegian former professional road cyclist.

== Major results ==
2013
9th Handzame Classic
