= Fredrik Strand Galta =

Norwegian cyclist

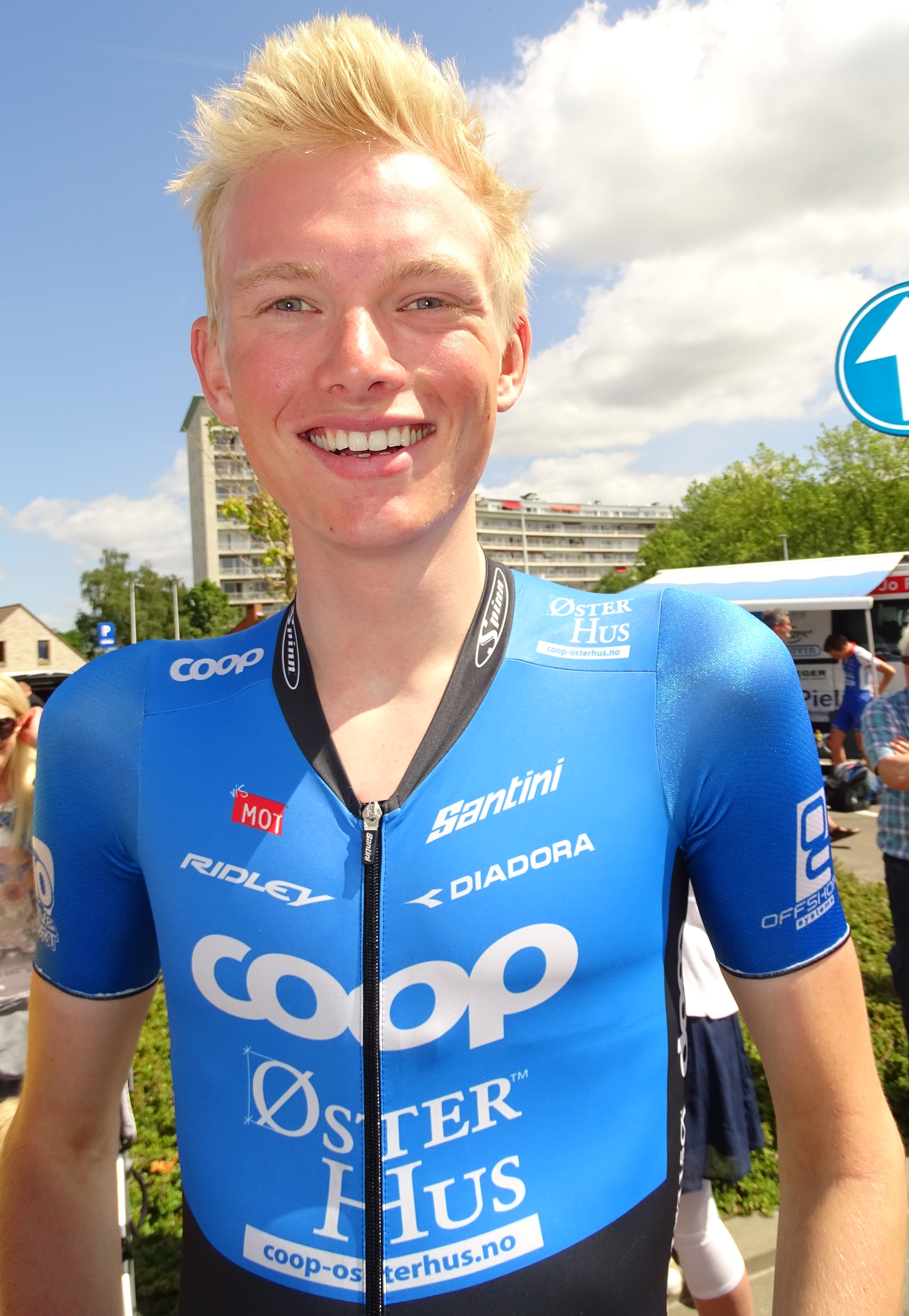
- Galta in 2015

Personal information
- Full name: Fredrik Strand Galta
- Born: October 19, 1992 (age 33) Norway
- Height: 1.92 m (6 ft 4 in)
- Weight: 78 kg (172 lb)

Cycling career
- Sport: Cycling
- Current team: Retired
- Discipline: Road
- Role: Rider

Amateur teams
- 2009–2011: Strand Stavanger SK
- 2011: Sparebanken Vest–Ridley (stagiaire)

Professional teams
- 2012–2015: Team Øster Hus–Ridley
- 2016: Delko–Marseille Provence KTM
- 2017: Team Coop

Fredrik Strand Galta (born October 19, 1992) is a Norwegian former professional road cyclist.

== Major results ==
2011
1st Stage 3 Eidsvollrittet
2013
1st Hadeland GP
10th Overall Boucle de l'Artois
2014
3rd Road race, National Under-23 Road Championships
2015
2nd Hadeland GP
2nd Memorial Van Coningsloo
4th Overall Tour of Norway
5th Overall Tour du Loir-et-Cher
5th Overall Kreiz Breizh Elites

1st Points classification
1st Stages 2 & 3

2017
9th Overall Tour du Loir-et-Cher
