= Odd Christian Eiking =

Norwegian road cyclist

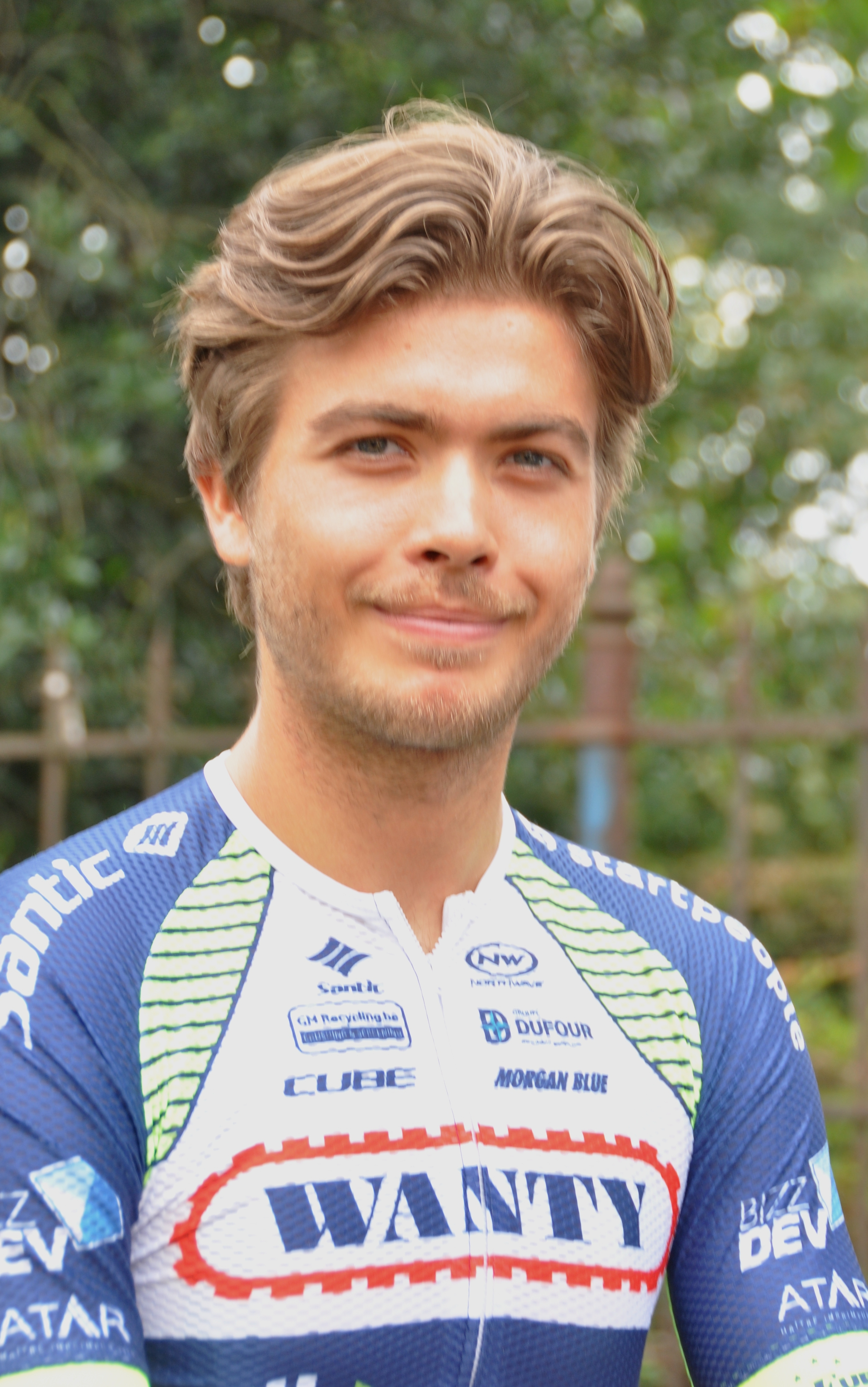
- Eiking at the 2018 Deutschland Tour

Personal information
- Full name: Odd Christian Eiking
- Born: 28 December 1994 (age 31) Stord Municipality, Norway
- Height: 1.82 m (6 ft 0 in)
- Weight: 75 kg (165 lb; 11.8 st)

Cycling career
- Sport: Cycling
- Current team: Unibet Rose Rockets
- Discipline: Road
- Role: Rider
- Rider type: Puncheur

Amateur team
- 2010–2013: Bergen CK

Professional teams
- 2014–2015: Team Joker
- 2016–2017: FDJ
- 2018–2021: Wanty–Groupe Gobert
- 2022–2023: EF Education–EasyPost
- 2024: Uno-X Mobility
- 2025–: Unibet Tietema Rockets

Odd Christian Eiking (born 28 December 1994) is a Norwegian cyclist, who currently rides for UCI ProTeam Unibet Rose Rockets.

== Career ==
Born in Stord Municipality, Eiking was named in the startlist for the 2016 Vuelta a España.

In August 2017, Eiking signed a contract with Wanty–Groupe Gobert and joined them ahead of the 2018 season. In July 2019, he was named in the startlist for the Tour de France.

At the 2021 Vuelta a España, Eiking was part of a 31-rider breakaway group on the tenth stage, from which he was the highest-placed rider in the general classification, trailing race leader Primož Roglič (Team Jumbo–Visma) by just over nine minutes overnight. The group's advantage over the peloton reached over thirteen minutes at its maximum, with Eiking ultimately finishing almost eleven-and-a-half minutes clear of Roglič, to take the race leader's red jersey. He held the race lead until the final week, ceding the jersey on stage 17, when he was dropped on the second of four categorised climbs to be ascented during the stage. He lost 9' 23" by the end of the stage, dropping to eleventh overall, where he would ultimately finish in the general classification. A few days after the race, Eiking signed a contract with the EF Education–EasyPost team for the 2022 season.

== Major results ==
2013
10th Overall Tour de Berlin
2014
2nd Overall Giro della Valle d'Aosta
3rd Road race, National Road Championships
4th Road race, National Under-23 Road Championships
4th Hadeland GP
5th Ringerike GP
2015
1st Road race, National Under-23 Road Championships
1st Young rider classification, Tour of Norway
1st Stage 2 Giro della Valle d'Aosta
2nd Road race, National Road Championships
3rd Overall Peace Race U23
3rd Ringerike GP
5th Hadeland GP
6th Overall Arctic Race of Norway
2016
1st Stage 1 (TTT) La Méditerranéenne
4th Overall Tour of Norway

1st Young rider classification

5th Overall Arctic Race of Norway
2017
1st Boucles de l'Aulne
10th Classic Loire-Atlantique
2018
1st Stage 3 Tour de Wallonie
2nd Grand Prix La Marseillaise
8th Overall Tour of Oman
8th Paris–Chauny
2019
Arctic Race of Norway

1st Mountains classification
1st Stage 3

3rd Ardèche Classic
3rd Grand Prix de Plumelec-Morbihan
6th Overall Tour of Guangxi
8th Grand Prix de Wallonie
2021
2nd Overall Arctic Race of Norway
7th Clásica de San Sebastián
10th Overall Étoile de Bessèges
10th Grand Prix La Marseillaise
Vuelta a España

Held after Stages 10–16

2022
2nd Coppa Sabatini
2024
8th Grand Prix du Morbihan
2025
3rd Overall Sibiu Cycling Tour
8th Overall Route d'Occitanie
9th Overall Tour de Hongrie

=== Grand Tour general classification results timeline ===
Grand Tour	2016	2017	2018	2019	2020	2021	2022	2023	2024
Giro d'Italia	Has not contested during his career								
Tour de France	—	—	—	111	—	—	—	—	34
Vuelta a España	77	DNF	—	—	—	11	—	—	—

Legend
—	Did not compete
DNF	Did not finish
