= Hønefoss Airport, Eggemoen =

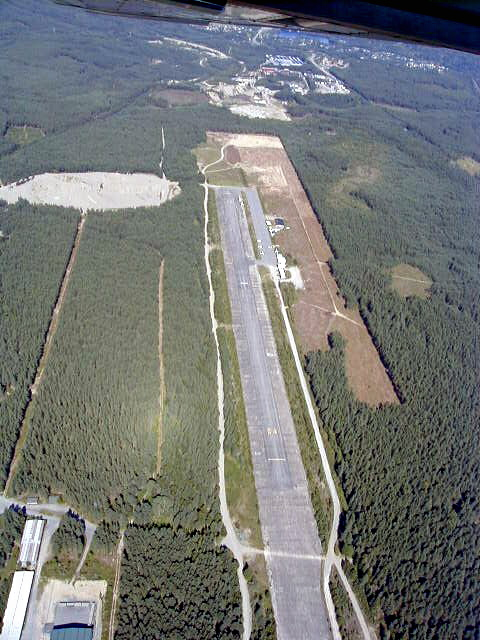
- The airport in 2007, before the last renovation
- IATA: none; ICAO: ENEG

Summary
- Airport type: Private
- Owner/Operator: Tronrud Engineering
- Serves: Hønefoss, Norway
- Location: Eggemoen, Ringerike Municipality, Norway
- Elevation AMSL: 200 m (660 ft)
- Coordinates: 60°13′N 010°19′E
- Website: eggemoen.no

Map
- Location in Norway

Runways
Direction	Length		Surface
Direction	m	ft	Surface
04/22	2,100	6,890	Asphalt

Hønefoss Airport, Eggemoen (Norwegian: Hønefoss flyplass, Eggemoen; ICAO: ENEG) is a private airport situated at Eggemoen in Ringerike Municipality, in Buskerud county Norway. The airport features a 2,100-meter (6,900 ft) asphalt runway aligned 04/22. The airport is owned by Tronrud Engineering and is part of Eggemoen Aviation & Technology Park. The airport is situated midway between Hønefoss and Jevnaker.

Construction of the airport commenced by Luftwaffe in 1943 and opened in September 1944. Amongst the largest airports in the country, it never filled its role as a military transit airport. During the Second World War it variously was home to Junkers Ju 88, Ju 87, Ju 52 and Messerschmitt Bf 109 aircraft. Eggemoen's largest task was as a central facility after the war for disposal and reuse of German aircraft.

From 1946 to 1952 the airport was home to Østlandske Flyselskap. It featured the Royal Norwegian Air Force's pilot school from 1951 to 1952. Since it has only seen negligible military use. Ringerike Municipality bought the airport in 1986. It was proposed used as the main general aviation airport for Eastern Norway, but a municipal referendum canceled the plans. Tronrud bought the airport in 2000 and it reopened in 2013 with the runway extended to its original length.

== History ==
=== Second World War ===
The Norwegian Army Air Service started in 1938 to look into suitable sites for a second airport in Eastern Norway, which could supplement Kjeller Airport. In addition to what would become Haslemoen Airport, it considered three sites in Ringerike: Hensmoen, Marigårdsmoen and Veme. Despite the lack of an airport, there was already an aviation club, Ringerike Flyklubb, based at Hvalsmoen. They encouraged the military to consider building an airport at Eggemoen. However, the plans did not come any further before the German invasion of Norway set in on 9 April 1940.

Luftwaffe soon took an interest in the airport plans and planning started in 1941. However, construction did not commence before 1943. A forest area 200 hectares (490 acres) was expropriated from Egge Farm and 200 Norwegians were hired to cut down the forest. Under the command of Erwin Keller, further construction was carried out by a combination of Organisation Todt, prisoners of war and Norwegian contractors. The plan for construction was extensive and was planned as one of the largest airports in Norway. This included a runway, a dummy runway on the other side of the Randsfjorden Line, a taxiway and hardened aircraft shelters, among others. The airport was completed in September 1944, by which time it had received an 1,800-by-60-meter (5,910 by 200 ft) runway. It also had landing lights and an instrument landing system, as well as a Lorenz radar.

The air base was activated on 29 September 1944 with the arrival of the first aircraft to be stationed there. This was the 1. Staffel of Fernaufklarungsgeschwader 120 which had been at Værnes Air Station. Initially there were four Junkers Ju 88s, later increasing to six. The squadron carried out reconnaissance. It was relocated to Lista Air Station on 25 December, the same day 20. Staffel of Transportgrupfe 20 was allocated to Eggemoen. It operated twelve Junkers Ju 52 transporters and remained at Eggemoen until the end of the war on 8 May 1945. For a short period in 1945 there was also a squadron of Messerschmitt Bf 109s stationed at Eggemoen. The airport was also used for stop-overs for a wide variety of German aircraft, typically for refueling.

The airport's intended use was as a stop-over for large numbers of aircraft in transit. This happened only once, in late 1944, when ninety Junkers Ju 87 Stukas refueled at Eggemoen. During early 1945 the Wehrmacht designated Eggemoen as a site to fly out senior officials should Germany surrender. Air defenses were installed, with 88 mm guns installed at Vågård and Gundersby, as well as smaller guns at the airfield itself. The Gundersby gun was dismounted and sent elsewhere. A wooden dummy was placed in its place, and Allied intelligence never discovered this.

Following the surrender on 8 May 1945, Eggemoen became a major transit station for Luftwaffe aircraft. In the airport's busiest period ever, it was the site for reallocation of aircraft. Some were to be retained in Norway and used by the Royal Norwegian Air Force, others sent to Germany for destruction and some allocated to the Royal Air Force.

=== Norwegian Armed Forces operations ===
After the aftermath died out, there was little military activity at Eggemoen. The airfield was kept in use, with Østlandske Flyselskap establishing a base there in 1946. They remained there until moving to Fornebu in 1952. Activities were mostly centered on air taxi and a pilot school.

The Royal Norwegian Air Force moved its pilot school to Eggemoen in 1951. The training was contracted to Widerøe, who operated the air force's aircraft. This was a short-term role for the airport, as the school was moved to Værnes on 3 June 1952. Eggemoen Base was expanded significantly from 1952 to 1954, and became the home for Engineering Company. This role was kept until 1963, after which it became used for engineering training. The airfield was little used, and surrounding it were built a series of training fields.

A 1988 commission considered Eggemoen as a potential site for a new main air station for fighter aircraft in Eastern Norway. Although it had sufficient area for construction, an air station would have to be built on both sides of the Randsfjorden Line. The proximity to Hønefoss and Jevnaker would incur high noise pollution. Investments would be high as the entire runway would have to be rotated ten degrees.

=== Civilian revival ===
Due to its proximity to Oslo, 44 kilometers (27 mi) north-northeast of the capital, Eggemoen was considered as a possible location of a new airport. A 1970 commission evaluated Eggemoen and found that it had insufficient area for Norway's main airport and that it had too many hills around it to meet runway safety standards. Eggemoen was the most expensive of the seven alternatives, in part caused by the high investments needed to ground transport. and also had the smallest surrounding communities around it, complicating the settlement of airport workers. This also reflected in its general isolation from the population centers in Eastern Norway. The airport was found to be advantageous in terms of air corridors, and low impact of noise pollution.

The municipality bought part of the runway in 1986 and established a civilian operation of the airport. he airport was shrunk by placing an asphalt airfield measuring 800 by 20 meters (2,625 by 66 ft) on the northern part of the concrete runway. By the 1990s the only operators left at the airfield were the aviation clubs.

With Gardermoen having been selected as the new main airport and the decision being made to close down Fornebu, a political debate arose in the early 1990s of where the general aviation airport for Eastern Norway should be located. The government proposed in 1994 that three airports share this role, Kjeller, Eggemoen and Rygge. Within two years Eggemoen was proposed as the main general aviation airport for Eastern Norway. State funding of NOK 50 million was offered. Traffic was estimated to increase from 6,000 aircraft movements per year to 40,000 in 1999 and 51,000 in 2010. A unanimous Jevnaker Municipal Council opposed the plans, as they would receive most of the noise pollution. With a vote 22 against 21, Ringerike Municipal Council voted in favor of a referendum concerning the airport. Held on 6 March 1996, tt had a turnout of 36 percent, of which 66.2 percent voted against the proposal for Eggemoen. This was confirmed in Ringerike Municipal Council, where with one decisive vote the approval was discarded.

Tronrud Engineering bought the airfield in two transaction, in 2000 and 2005, along with the rest of Eggemoen Base. Work started on converting the facility to an industrial park centered on the airfield. Although civilian aviation authorities proposed an 800-meter (2,600 ft) runway, instead the full length of 2,100 meters (6,900 ft). The aerodrome was eventually closed in 2009 for a complete renovation. Tronrud Engineering hoped that the investments would allow aerospace industries to relocate to Eggemoen. Air Service Vamdrup, a provider of air maintenance, established its Norwegian division at Eggemoen in May 2014.

== Facilities ==
Hønefoss Airport, Eggemoen is situated at Eggemoen, located 5 kilometers (3 mi) east of Hønefoss and 4 kilometers (2 mi) west of Jevnaker. The airfield is part of Eggemoen Aviation & Technology Park, which is owned by Tronrud Engineering. The aerodrome features an asphalt runway measuring 2,100 by 45 meters (6,890 by 148 ft), aligned 04/22. It is limited to aircraft smaller than a maximum take-off weight of 5.7 tonnes (5.6 long tons; 6.3 short tons), carrying less than ten passengers and is limited to 15,200 aircraft movements per year. Eggemoen has a reference elevation of 200 meters (656 ft) above mean sea level.

== Bibliography ==
- Arheim, Tom; Hafsten, Bjørn; Olsen, Bjørn; Thuve, Sverre (1994). Fra Spitfire til F-16: Luftforsvaret 50 år 1944–1994 (in Norwegian). Oslo: Sem & Stenersen. ISBN 82-7046-068-0.
- Hafsten, Bjørn; Larsstuvold, Ulf; Olsen, Bjørn; Stenersen, Sten (1991). Flyalarm: Luftkrigen over Norge 1939–1945 (in Norwegian). Oslo: Sem & Stenersen. ISBN 82-7046-058-3.
- Ministry of Defence (1988). Innstilling fra Jagerflyplassutvalget (in Norwegian). Oslo.
- Ministry of Transport and Communications (1970). Innstilling om flyplasser i Oslo-området. Del 1 (in Norwegian). Oslo.
- Østlund, Jan Helge (1997). Krigen på Ringerike 2: Okkupasjon, motstand og frigjøring (in Norwegian). Hønefoss: Knolltopp. ISBN 8299381010.
- Torblå, Pål (1993). Hvalsmoen ekserserplass 1893–1993 (in Norwegian). Oslo: Fabritius. ISBN 8290545231.
