= Sundvolden GP =

Norwegian one-day road cycling race

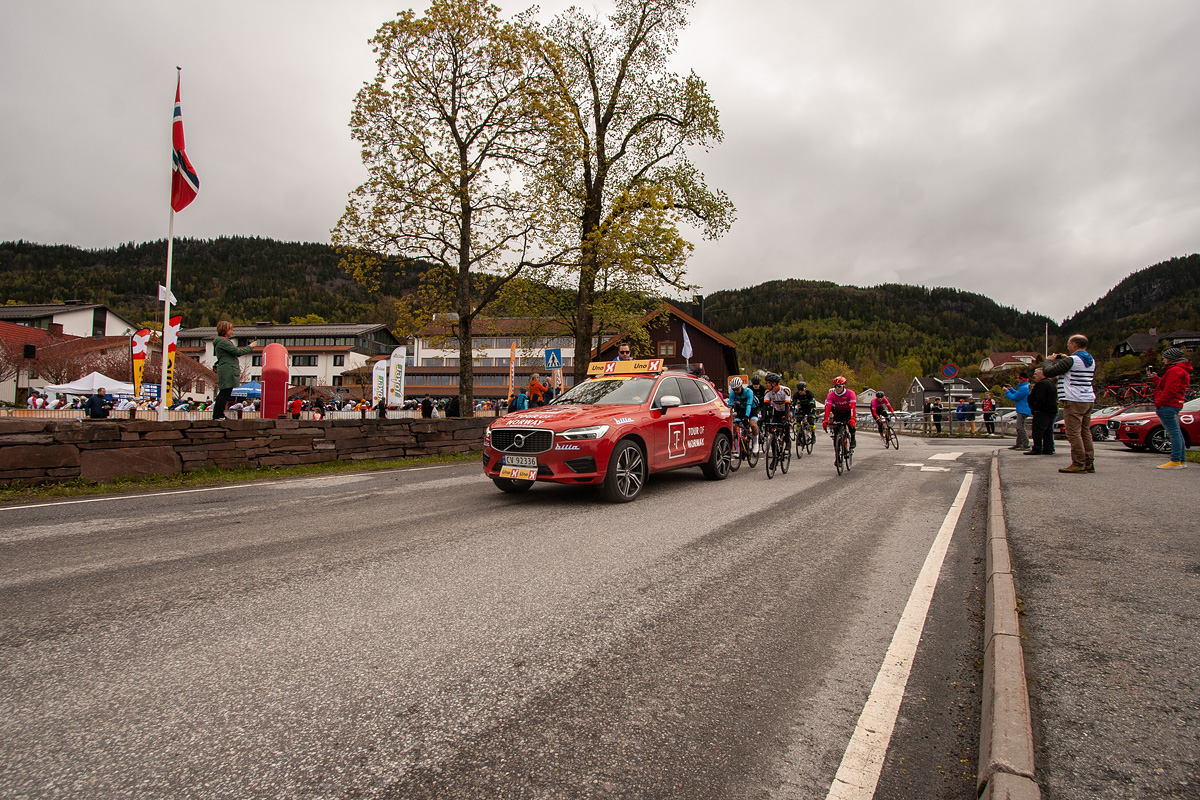
- Sundvolden Grand Prix 2019 - ceremonial start

Race details
- Date: May
- Discipline: Road
- Competition: UCI Europe Tour 1.2
- Type: One-day race
- Web site: www.rgp.no

History
- First edition: 2013
- Editions: 12 (as of 2026)
- First winner: Fredrik Strand Galta (NOR)
- Most wins: Rasmus Guldhammer (DEN) (2 wins)
- Most recent: Gustav Lovidius (SWE)

The Sundvolden GP is a one-day cycling race held in Norway. It is part of UCI Europe Tour in category 1.2. The race was named Hadeland GP until 2016.

== Winners ==
Year	Country	Rider	Team
2013	Norway	Fredrik Strand Galta	Team Øster Hus–Ridley
2014	Denmark	Rasmus Guldhammer	Team TreFor–Blue Water
2015	Denmark	Søren Kragh Andersen	Team TreFor–Blue Water
2016	Norway	Andreas Vangstad	Team Sparebanken Sør
2017	Denmark	Rasmus Guldhammer	Team VéloCONCEPT
2018	Denmark	Alexander Kamp	Team Virtu Cycling
2019	Norway	Trond Trondsen	Team Coop
2020– 2021	No race due to the COVID-19 pandemic in Norway		
2022	Denmark	Martin Tjøtta	Ringerike SK
2023	Norway	Ådne Holter	Uno-X Dare Development Team
2024	Norway	Idar Andersen	Uno-X Mobility Development Team
2025	Norway	Andreas Leknessund	Uno-X Mobility
2026	Sweden	Gustav Lovidius	Svealand Cycling Team
