= Team Sparebanken Sør =

Norwegian cycling team

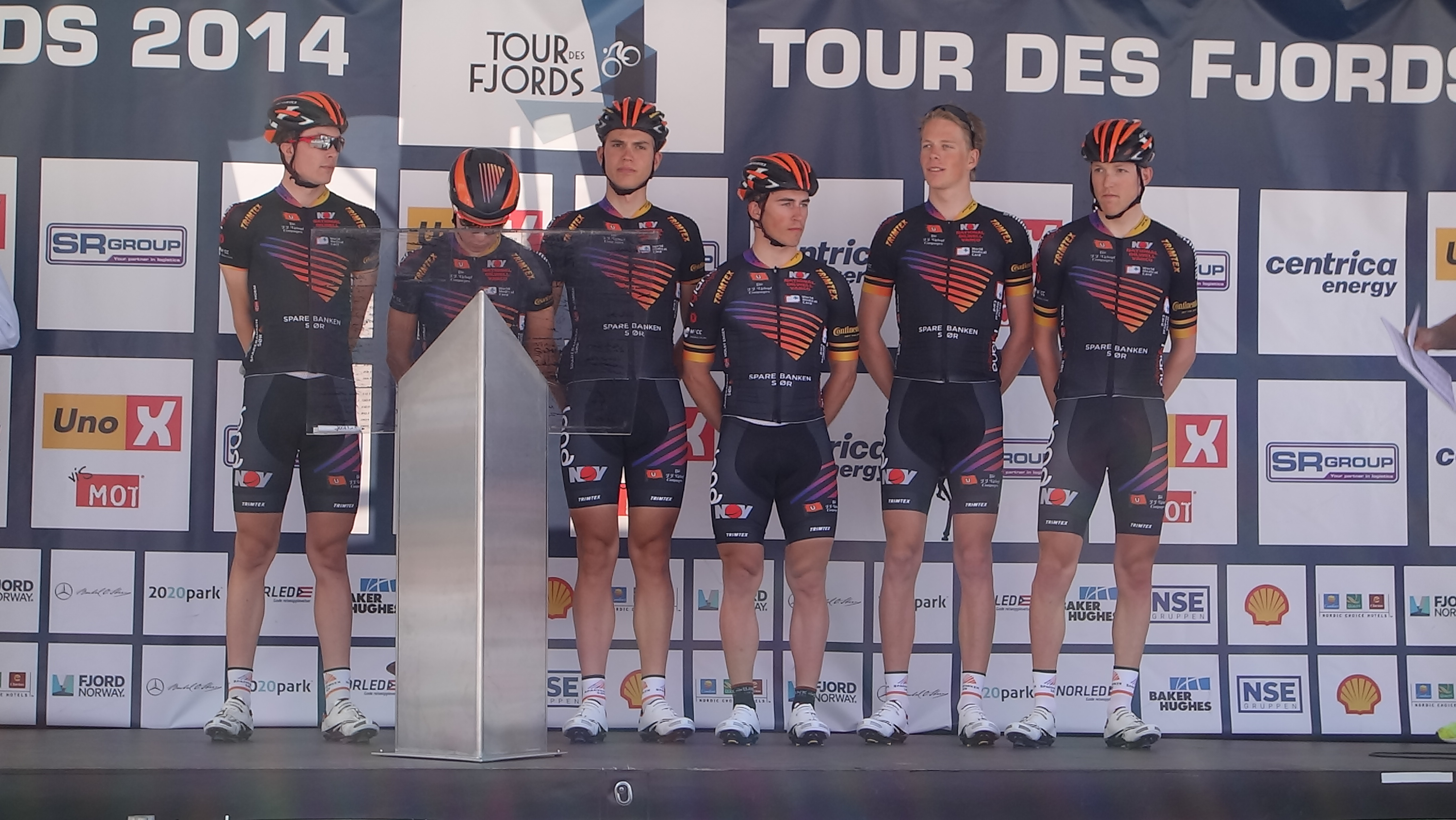

Team information
- UCI code: TSS
- Registered: Norway
- Founded: 2010
- Disbanded: 2017
- Discipline: Road
- Status: Continental

Key personnel
- General manager: Vidar Røinås

Team name history
- 2010–2011 2012 2013 2014–2017: Plussbank–Cervélo; Plussbank BMC; Team Plussbank; Team Sparebanken Sør

Team Sparebanken Sør, (UCI team code: TSS) was a Norwegian licensed, UCI Continental cycling team, based in Grimstad, Norway. The team consisted of eleven competitive riders. Grimstad resident and former professional cyclist, Thor Hushovd, owned the team.

The team was originally conceived as a feeder team for Cervélo TestTeam. The team's directeur sportifs were Atle Kvålsvoll and Olav Aleksander Benjaminsen.

The team disbanded at the end of the 2017 season.

== Major wins ==
2015
Stage 3 East Bohemia Tour, Fridtjof Røinås
Fyen Rundt, Andreas Vangstad
Stage 5 Tour of Norway, Andreas Vangstad

2016
Ringerike GP, Trond Trondsen
Sundvolden GP, Andreas Vangstad
Stage 3 Tour du Loir et Cher E Provost, Fridtjof Røinås

2017
Overall Baltic Chain Tour, Herman Dahl

Stages 3 & 4, Herman Dahl

Prologue Troféu Joaquim Agostinho, Andreas Vangstad

== Sponsors ==
Plussbank is a local savings bank based in southern Norway. Plussbank, as the general sponsor of the cycling team, provides the team with its name, alongside their cycling sponsor, BMC.

== Team roster ==
Rider	Date of birth
Kristian Aasvold (NOR)	30 May 1995 (age 31)
Eirik Bruland (NOR)	20 February 1995 (age 31)
Herman Dahl (NOR)	24 November 1993 (age 32)
Andreas Erland (NOR)	31 August 1992 (age 34)
Ludvik Aspelund Holstad (NOR)	1 August 1998 (age 28)

Rider	Date of birth
Fridtjof Røinås (NOR)	2 August 1994 (age 32)
Mathias Skjold (NOR)	20 September 1996 (age 29)
Petter Theodorsen (NOR)	4 April 1995 (age 31)
Trond Trondsen (NOR)	8 April 1994 (age 32)
Andreas Vangstad (NOR)	24 March 1992 (age 34)
