= 2015 Team Sky season =

Team Sky
- 2015 season
- Salvatore Puccio on time trial stage Tour of Slovenia 2015
- UCI code: SKY
- Status: UCI ProTeam
- World Tour Rank: 3rd (1378 points)
- Manager: Dave Brailsford
- Main sponsor(s): Sky
- Based: National Cycling Centre; Manchester; England
- Bicycles: Pinarello
- Groupset: Shimano

Season victories
- One-day races: 3
- Stage race overall: 7
- Stage race stages: 28
- Grand Tours: 1
- World Championships: 1
- National Championships: 3
- Most wins: Elia Viviani (8 wins)
- Best ranked rider: Chris Froome (6th)

The 2015 season for Team Sky began in January at the Tour Down Under.

As a UCI WorldTeam, they were automatically invited and obliged to send a squad to every event in the UCI World Tour.

== Team roster ==
As of 19 August 2015

Rider	Date of birth
Ian Boswell (USA)	7 February 1991 (aged 24)
Philip Deignan (IRL)	7 September 1983 (aged 31)
Nathan Earle (AUS)	4 June 1988 (aged 27)
Bernhard Eisel (AUT)	17 February 1981 (aged 34)
Andrew Fenn (GBR)	1 July 1990 (aged 25)
Chris Froome (GBR)	20 May 1985 (aged 30)
Tao Geoghegan Hart (Note: Geoghegan Hart joined the team on 1 August as a stagiaire, from Axeon Cycling Team) (GBR)	30 March 1995 (aged 20)
Sebastián Henao (COL)	5 August 1993 (aged 22)
Sergio Henao (COL)	10 December 1987 (aged 27)
Peter Kennaugh (GBR)	15 June 1989 (aged 26)
Vasil Kiryienka (BLR)	28 June 1981 (aged 34)
Christian Knees (GER)	5 March 1981 (aged 34)
Leopold König (CZE)	15 November 1987 (aged 27)
David López (ESP)	13 May 1981 (aged 34)
Mikel Nieve (ESP)	26 May 1984 (aged 31)
Lars Petter Nordhaug (NOR)	14 May 1984 (aged 31)

Rider	Date of birth
Danny Pate (USA)	23 March 1979 (aged 36)
Alex Peters (Note: Peters joined the team on 1 August as a stagiaire, from SEG Racing) (GBR)	31 March 1994 (aged 21)
Wout Poels (NED)	1 October 1987 (aged 27)
Richie Porte (AUS)	30 January 1985 (aged 30)
Salvatore Puccio (ITA)	31 August 1989 (aged 25)
Nicolas Roche (IRL)	3 July 1984 (aged 31)
Luke Rowe (GBR)	10 March 1990 (aged 25)
Kanstantsin Sivtsov (BLR)	9 August 1982 (aged 32)
Ian Stannard (GBR)	25 May 1987 (aged 28)
Chris Sutton (AUS)	10 September 1984 (aged 30)
Ben Swift (GBR)	5 November 1987 (aged 27)
Geraint Thomas (GBR)	25 May 1986 (aged 29)
Bradley Wiggins (Note: Wiggins left the team to join the new WIGGINS squad after the 2015 Paris–Roubaix in April.) (GBR)	28 April 1980 (aged 35)
Elia Viviani (ITA)	7 February 1989 (aged 26)
Xabier Zandio (ESP)	17 March 1977 (aged 38)

Riders who joined the team for the 2015 season

Rider	2014 team
Andrew Fenn	Omega Pharma–Quick-Step
Leopold König	NetApp–Endura
Lars Petter Nordhaug	Belkin Pro Cycling
Wout Poels	Omega Pharma–Quick-Step
Nicolas Roche	Tinkoff–Saxo
Elia Viviani	Cannondale

Riders who left the team during or after the 2014 season

Rider	2015 team
Gabriel Rasch	Retired
Jonathan Tiernan-Locke	None
Edvald Boasson Hagen	MTN–Qhubeka
Dario Cataldo	Astana
Joe Dombrowski	Cannondale–Garmin
Josh Edmondson	An Post–Chain Reaction

== Season overview ==
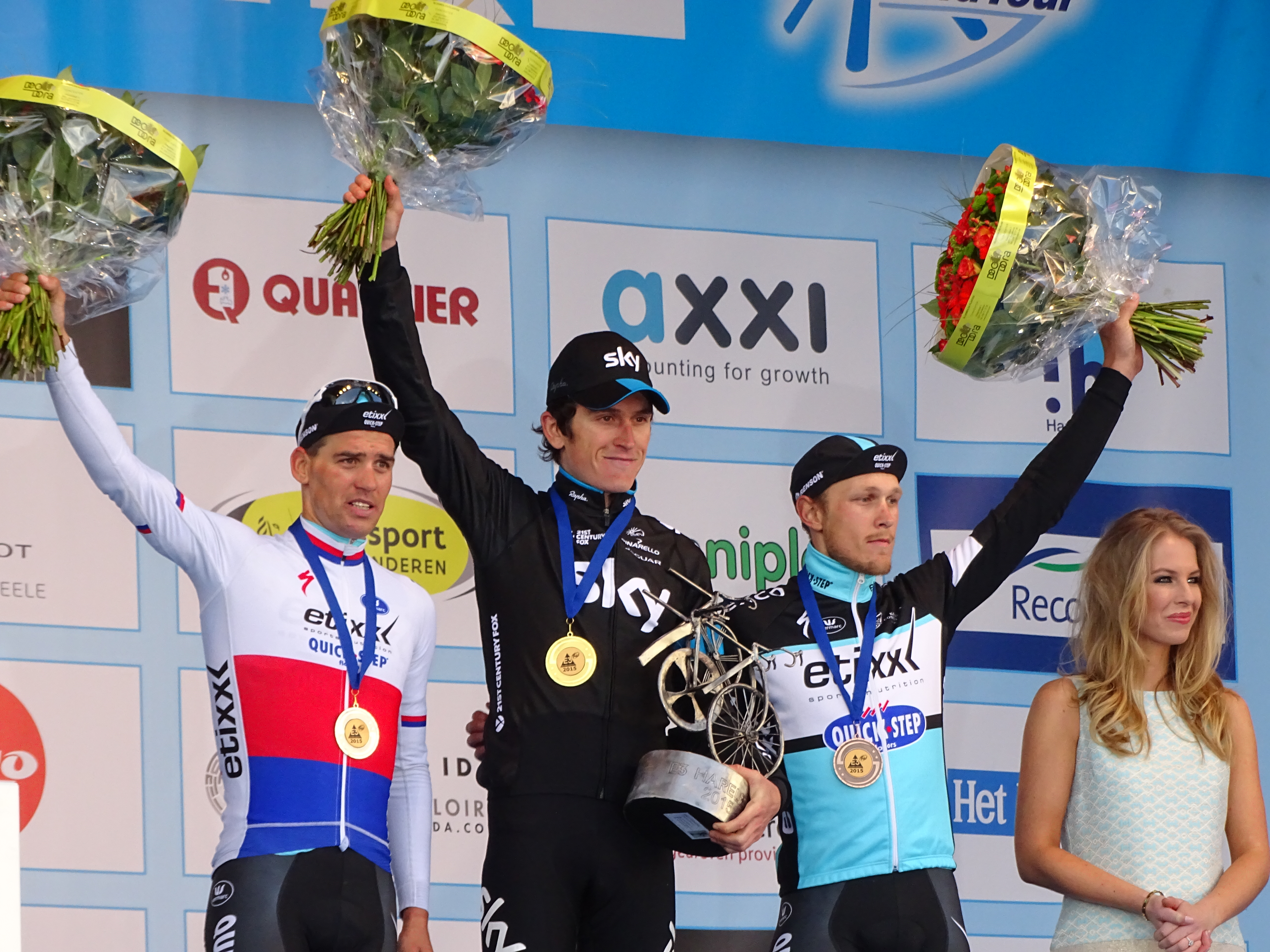
Thomas on the podium at E3 Harelbeke

On 8 January, Richie Porte scored the team's first victory of the season by winning the Australian National Time Trial championships with a margin of eight seconds and went on to record the team's first stage win at the Tour Down Under. Elia Viviani scored his first win for the team, taking sprint victory on stage two of the Dubai Tour.

In August, the team signed Alex Peters and Tao Geoghegan Hart for the remainder of the season, with the former also signing for two years.

=== Grand Tours ===
==== Giro d'Italia ====
The team entered the 2015 Giro d'Italia with Porte installed as team leader in the hope that he would continue his good run in stage races and claim the Maglia Rosa. In order to do this and in the team's quest for 'marginal gains' Porte slept in a motorhome which followed the race, rather than hotels like the rest of the team. After limiting the time loss in the stage 1 team time trial Elia Viviani secured the first win for the team in a Grand Tour since the 2013 Vuelta a España on stage 2, also taking over the Maglia rossa. After enjoying a successful first week Porte entered the second week of racing in third position overall, however on stage 10 an untimely puncture (outside of the 3 km ruling) caused him to lose 47 seconds to overall race leader, Alberto Contador. Porte was left isolated due to the puncture and accepted a wheel swap with Team Jayco–AlUla and close friend Simon Clarke, contravening UCI rule 12.1.040, which prohibits "non-regulation assistance to a rider from another team". Porte and Clarke were subsequently docked two minutes each and faced a 200 Swiss Franc fine. This resulted in Porte dropping down to 12th on the general classification, three minutes and nine seconds behind Contador. The implementation of the penalty caused outcry on social media; David Millar praised the sportsmanship shown between the two riders as well as Jonathan Vaughters, Chris Horner, Chris Boardman and Tom Domoulin. Team Principal, Dave Brailsford criticised the decision, saying that the "spirit of the law" had not been recognised and that there was a lack of common sense. Giro d'Italia race director Mauro Vegni claimed the rule had to be enforced whilst UCI President Brian Cookson agreed that it was the correct decision. Porte then lost further time on the uphill finish at Monte Berico on stage 12 and a further two minutes on stage 13 after being caught behind a crash, leaving him in 17th spot, five minutes and five seconds behind new overall leader, Fabio Aru. Stage 14 saw the riders tackle the 59.4 km time trial from Treviso to Valdobbiadene, where Vasil Kiryienka claimed the stage win, whilst Porte conceded a further four minutes and six seconds to Contador, leaving him in 17th position, eight minutes and 52 seconds behind the race leader. On the next stage Porte lost a further 27 minutes and abandoned on the second rest day, team leadership being handed over to Leopold König. König would finish the Giro in sixth position, over ten minutes behind victor, Alberto Contador.

==== Tour de France ====
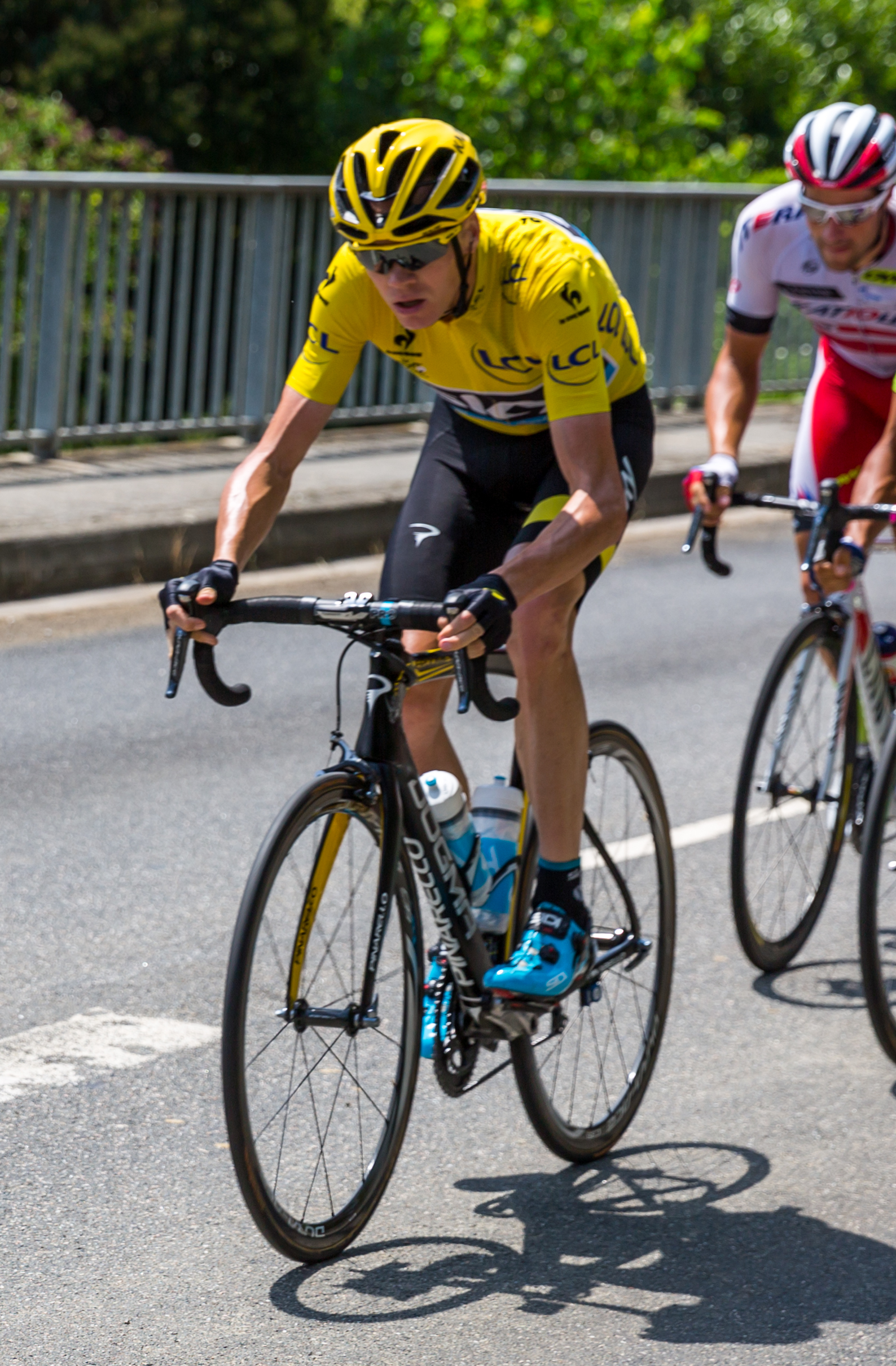
Froome in the leaders jersey on stage thirteen of the 2015 Tour de France

The team went into the 2015 Tour de France with their "strongest team ever" seeking to improve on their poor 2014 edition of the race. The team entered with Froome leading the title challenge, along with Poels, König, Kennaugh, Porte and Roche for the hillier stages as well as Stannard, Rowe and Thomas for the flatter days, in particular stage 4 from Seraing to Cambrai which featured no less than seven cobbled sectors. After a strong performance on the Mur de Huy Froome took over the race lead, and general classification by one second over Tony Martin. The previous time he had held the yellow jersey he won the race. Froome refused to wear the yellow jersey after Tony Martin abandoned the race due to a broken collar bone sustained on stage six. Froome then received the yellow jersey at the end of the seventh stage by virtue of being in second place overall. During the evening of the first rest day of the Tour, it emerged that some of Froome's data files had been hacked and released onto the internet. As the Tour entered the second week of racing stage 10 saw the first mountains stage, the summit finish of La Pierre-Saint-Martin, where Froome went on to take the stage win, putting significant time into his general classification rivals as well as Porte finishing second and Thomas finishing sixth. During the remainder of the race the team faced intense scrutiny regarding their dominant performances; Porte was punched in the ribs by a spectator in the Pyrenees, and Froome claimed he had urine thrown at him by another spectator, and blamed the incident on the French press for 'irresponsible' reporting

On the first rest of the Tour de France Porte confirmed he would leave the team at the end of the season. This would later, in August, be confirmed to be CCC Pro Team.

==== La Vuelta a España ====
On 10 August, Chris Froome announced his intention to compete in this years Vuelta a España, becoming only the second reigning Tour winner to ride the Vuelta in the same season.

=== Stage races ===
In February the team dominated the Vuelta a Andalucía and Volta ao Algarve with both Froome and Thomas taking both overall wins respectively. On the way to their respective victories Froome won on the stage four summit finish at Alto de Allanadas, whilst both Thomas and Porte won in the Algarve, winning stage two and the stage four summit finish of Malhão. Further, the team also secured multiple top placings; fourth (Nieve), sixth (Kennaugh) and eighth (Siutsou) in Andalucía and fourth (Porte) in the Algarve. At the end of February Stannard scored the team second classic, taking a second successive victory at Omloop Het Nieuwsblad. The victory was made more impressive as Stannard made the four-man selection with three Etixx–Quick-Step riders; Boonen, Terpstra and Vandenbergh.

The team's next victory came at Paris–Nice where Porte led a team one-two (along with Thomas) at the summit finish of Croix de Chaubouret. Despite both Porte and Thomas crashing on the stage 6 descent of the Côte de Peille Porte went on to win the stage 7 time trial to the summit of Col d'Èze securing his second overall victory in the race, with a winning margin of 30 seconds over Michał Kwiatkowski.

In the same week, new recruit Wout Poels recorded his first victory for the team when he secured victory on the fifth stage of Tirreno–Adriatico to Castelraimondo. Poels made his decisive move just before the second summiting of the Cipressa, finishing 14 seconds clear of former Sky rider Rigoberto Urán, Joaquim Rodríguez and the rest of the leading group. As a result of his win, Poels moved into the overall race lead. Ben Swift won the second stage of Settimana Internazionale di Coppi e Bartali the same day and finally Richie Porte moved into the lead of the Volta a Catalunya a lead he would carry to the end of the race. Victory in Catalunya represented Porte's second overall win of the season and the fourth for the team.

In April, Bradley Wiggins won his final time trial for the team at the Three Days of De Panne, beating Stefan Küng by 10 seconds.

In late April Porte notched up his third overall win of the season, taking the Giro d'Italia warm-up Giro del Trentino four-day stage race. Porte took a decisive stage victory on the queen stage summit finish to Brentonico giving him a margin of 24 seconds over his closest rival, Mikel Landa. Porte would carry the majority of this gap to the finish in Cles. The team then rounded off a successful April by taking victory in the Team Time Trial, by the scant margin of 0.63 seconds, at the Tour de Romandie, placing Geraint Thomas in the yellow leaders jersey

The team rounded off April taking victory in the Tour de Romandie team time trial, Froome taking third place overall. The team began May with success; Lars Petter Nordhaug took the opening stage win at the inaugural Tour de Yorkshire, whilst Ben Swift crashed out later requiring surgery.

Chris Froome returned to action at the Critérium du Dauphiné, as part of his build up for the Tour de France, and the team won three stages and took the overall title for the fourth time. Peter Kennaugh opened the team's account taking the victory on stage one, just in front of the bunch sprint finish. Froome went on to dominate the final two summit finish stages, taking victory at Montée du Bettex (stage 7) and Modane Valfréjus (stage 8) giving him a lead of 10 seconds over Tejay van Garderen.

=== One day races ===
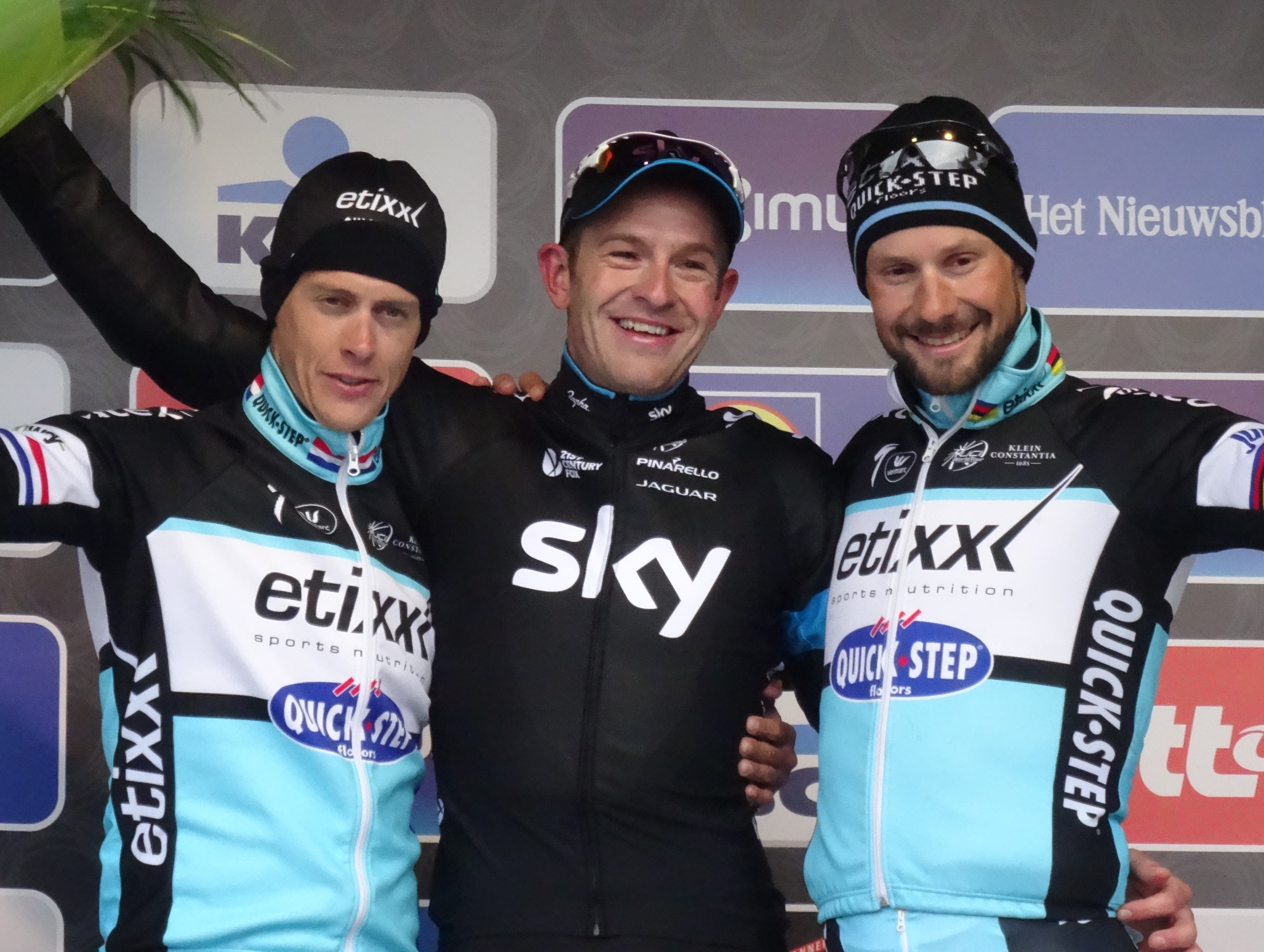
Ian Stannard on the podium at the 2015 Omloop Het Nieuwsblad

In late March the team enjoyed a bumper weekend starting with Geraint Thomas' victory in E3 Harelbeke after attacking his co-breakaway companions, Zdeněk Štybar and Peter Sagan, and soloing to victory.

The weekend was then finished off with Thomas once again, taking third place in Gent–Wevelgem behind victor Luca Paolini and runner-up Niki Terpstra.

After finishing 31 seconds down on Paris–Roubaix winner John Degenkolb, Bradley Wiggins retired from the team and joined his own WIGGINS team, allowing him to focus on the 2016 Olympic Games.

New signing Wout Poels underwent surgery on a broken shoulder bone courtesy of his crash at La Fleche Wallonne.

== Season victories ==
Date	Race	Competition	Rider	Country	Location
24 January	Tour Down Under, Stage 5	UCI World Tour	Richie Porte (AUS)	Australia	Willunga
5 February	Dubai Tour, Stage 2	UCI Asia Tour	Elia Viviani (ITA)	United Arab Emirates	Dubai
19 February	Volta ao Algarve, Stage 2	UCI Europe Tour	Geraint Thomas (GBR)	Portugal	Monchique
21 February	Vuelta a Andalucía, Stage 4	UCI Europe Tour	Chris Froome (GBR)	Spain	Alto de Allanadas
21 February	Volta ao Algarve, Stage 4	UCI Europe Tour	Richie Porte (AUS)	Portugal	Loulé–Alto do Malhão
22 February	Vuelta a Andalucía, Overall	UCI Europe Tour	Chris Froome (GBR)	Spain	
22 February	Vuelta a Andalucía, Points classification	UCI Europe Tour	Chris Froome (GBR)	Spain	
22 February	Vuelta a Andalucía, Combination classification	UCI Europe Tour	Chris Froome (GBR)	Spain	
22 February	Vuelta a Andalucía, Teams classification	UCI Europe Tour	(Note: The riders on the squad were Chris Froome, Nicolas Roche, Vasil Kiryienka, Mikel Nieve, Peter Kennaugh, Kanstantsin Sivtsov and Xabier Zandio)	Spain	
22 February	Volta ao Algarve, Overall	UCI Europe Tour	Geraint Thomas (GBR)	Portugal	
22 February	Volta ao Algarve, Points classification	UCI Europe Tour	Geraint Thomas (GBR)	Portugal	
22 February	Volta ao Algarve, Mountains classification	UCI Europe Tour	Richie Porte (AUS)	Portugal	
28 February	Omloop Het Nieuwsblad	UCI Europe Tour	Ian Stannard (GBR)	Belgium	Ghent
12 March	Paris–Nice, Stage 4	UCI World Tour	Richie Porte (AUS)	France	Croix de Chaubouret
14 March	Tirreno–Adriatico, Stage 4	UCI World Tour	Wout Poels (NED)	Italy	Castelraimondo
15 March	Paris–Nice, Stage 7	UCI World Tour	Richie Porte (AUS)	France	Col d'Èze
15 March	Paris–Nice, Overall	UCI World Tour	Richie Porte (AUS)	France	
15 March	Paris–Nice, Teams classification	UCI World Tour	(Note: The riders on the squad were Bradley Wiggins, Christian Knees, Lars Petter Nordhaug, Richie Porte, Nicolas Roche, Luke Rowe, Ben Swift and Geraint Thomas)	France	
27 March	Settimana Internazionale di Coppi e Bartali, Stage 2	UCI Europe Tour	Ben Swift (GBR)	Italy	Sogliano al Rubicone
27 March	E3 Harelbeke	UCI World Tour	Geraint Thomas (GBR)	Belgium	Harelbeke
29 March	Volta a Catalunya, Overall	UCI World Tour	Richie Porte (AUS)	Spain	
29 March	Settimana Internazionale di Coppi e Bartali, Points classification	UCI Europe Tour	Ben Swift (GBR)	Italy	
29 March	Settimana Internazionale di Coppi e Bartali, Teams classification	UCI Europe Tour	(Note: The riders on the squad were Ben Swift, Philip Deignan, Nathan Earle, Christopher Sutton, Kanstantsin Sivtsov, Ian Boswell and Sergio Henao)	Italy	
2 April	Three Days of De Panne, Stage 3b	UCI Europe Tour	Bradley Wiggins (GBR)	Belgium	De Panne
22 April	Giro del Trentino, Stage 2	UCI Europe Tour	Richie Porte (AUS)	Italy	Brentonico
24 April	Giro del Trentino, Overall	UCI Europe Tour	Richie Porte (AUS)	Italy	
28 April	Tour de Romandie, Stage 1	UCI World Tour	Team time trial (Note: The winning riders were Chris Froome, Danny Pate, Nicolas Roche, Peter Kennaugh, Luke Rowe, Ian Stannard, Geraint Thomas and Elia Viviani)	Switzerland	Vallorbe
1 May	Tour de Yorkshire, Stage 1	UCI Europe Tour	Lars Petter Nordhaug (NOR)	United Kingdom	Scarborough
3 May	Tour de Yorkshire, Overall	UCI Europe Tour	Lars Petter Nordhaug (NOR)	United Kingdom	
3 May	Tour de Yorkshire, Points classification	UCI Europe Tour	Lars Petter Nordhaug (NOR)	United Kingdom	
3 May	Tour de Yorkshire, Teams classification	UCI Europe Tour	(Note: The riders on the squad were Ben Swift, Ian Boswell, Philip Deignan, Nathan Earle, David López, Lars Petter Nordhaug, Salvatore Puccio and Christopher Sutton)	United Kingdom	
10 May	Giro d'Italia, Stage 2	UCI World Tour	Elia Viviani (ITA)	Italy	Genoa
17 May	Tour of California, Teams classification	UCI America Tour	(Note: The riders on the squad were Peter Kennaugh, Ian Boswell, Philip Deignan, Xabier Zandio, Sergio Henao, Christian Knees, Danny Pate and Nathan Earle)	United States	
23 May	Giro d'Italia, Stage 14	UCI World Tour	Vasil Kiryienka (BLR)	Italy	Valdobbiadene
7 June	Critérium du Dauphiné, Stage 1	UCI World Tour	Peter Kennaugh (GBR)	France	Albertville
13 June	Critérium du Dauphiné, Stage 7	UCI World Tour	Chris Froome (GBR)	France	Saint-Gervais-les-Bains
14 June	Critérium du Dauphiné, Stage 8	UCI World Tour	Chris Froome (GBR)	France	Modane
14 June	Critérium du Dauphiné, Overall	UCI World Tour	Chris Froome (GBR)	France	
21 June	Tour de Suisse, Teams classification	UCI World Tour	(Note: The riders on the squad were Sergio Henao, Geraint Thomas, David López, Lars Petter Nordhaug, Bernhard Eisel, Christian Knees, Kanstantsin Sivtsov and Danny Pate)	Switzerland	
21 June	Tour of Slovenia, Points classification	UCI Europe Tour	Salvatore Puccio (ITA) (Note: Retroactively awarded, following the expunging of the results previously achieved by Davide Appollonio.)	Slovenia	
14 July	Tour de France, Stage 10	UCI World Tour	Chris Froome (GBR)	France	La Pierre Saint-Martin
26 July	Tour de France, Overall	UCI World Tour	Chris Froome (GBR)	France	
26 July	Tour de France, Mountains classification	UCI World Tour	Chris Froome (GBR)	France	
7 August	Tour de Pologne, Stage 6	UCI World Tour	Sergio Henao (COL)	Poland	Bukowina Tatrzańska
10 August	Eneco Tour, Stage 1	UCI World Tour	Elia Viviani (ITA)	Netherlands	Bolsward
6 September	Tour of Britain, Stage 1	UCI Europe Tour	Elia Viviani (ITA)	United Kingdom	Wrexham
8 September	Tour of Britain, Stage 3	UCI Europe Tour	Elia Viviani (ITA)	United Kingdom	Floors Castle
10 September	Tour of Britain, Stage 5	UCI Europe Tour	Wout Poels (NED)	United Kingdom	Hartside Fell
10 September	Vuelta a España, Stage 18	UCI World Tour	Nicolas Roche (IRL)	Spain	Riaza
13 September	Tour of Britain, Stage 8	UCI Europe Tour	Elia Viviani (ITA)	United Kingdom	London
9 October	Abu Dhabi Tour, Stage 2	UCI Asia Tour	Elia Viviani (ITA)	United Arab Emirates	Abu Dhabi
11 October	Abu Dhabi Tour, Stage 4	UCI Asia Tour	Elia Viviani (ITA)	United Arab Emirates	Yas Marina Circuit
11 October	Abu Dhabi Tour, Points classification	UCI Asia Tour	Elia Viviani (ITA)	United Arab Emirates	
18 October	Chrono des Nations	UCI Europe Tour	Vasil Kiryienka (BLR)	France	Les Herbiers

== National, Continental and World champions 2015 ==
Date	Discipline	Jersey	Rider	Country	Location
8 January	Australian National Time Trial Champion		Richie Porte (AUS)	Australia	Buninyong
18 June	European Games Time Trial Champion		Vasil Kiryienka (BLR)	Azerbaijan	Baku
26 June	Belarus National Time Trial Champion		Vasil Kiryienka (BLR)	Belarus	Naroulia
28 June	British National Road Race Champion		Peter Kennaugh (GBR)	United Kingdom	Lincoln
23 September	World Time Trial Championships		Vasil Kiryienka (BLR)	United States	Richmond
