= Middlethorpe, East Riding of Yorkshire =

Hamlet in the East Riding of Yorkshire, England

Coordinates: 53.898640°N 0.644437°W

Middlethorpe
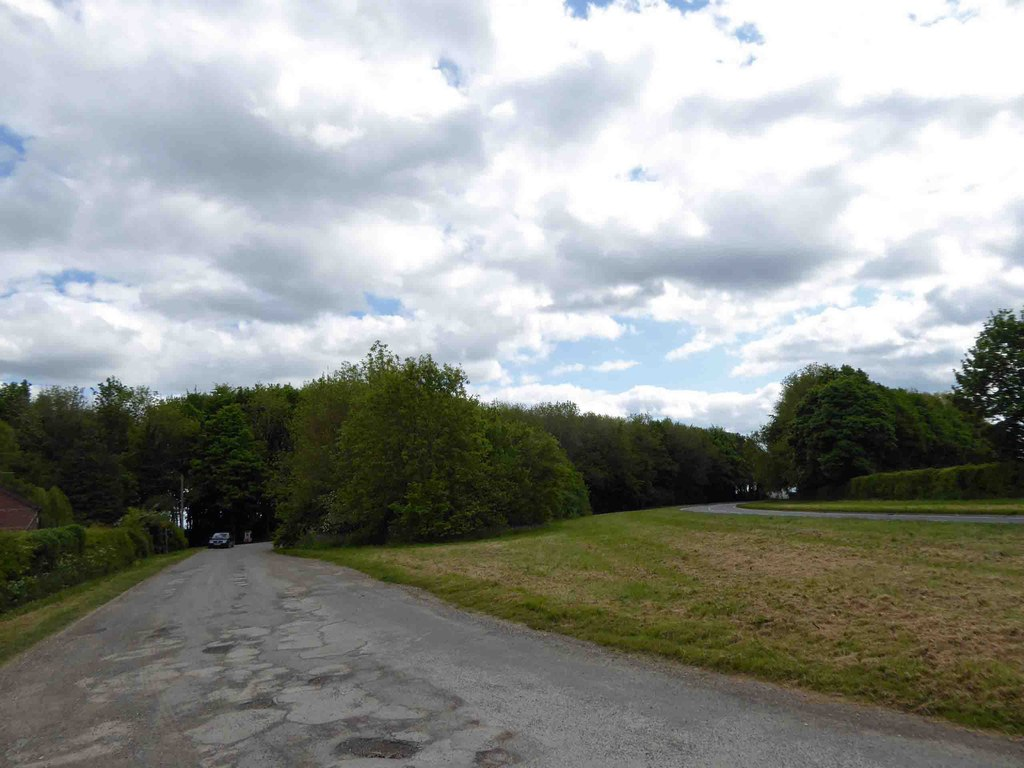
- Layby and access road to Middlethorpe Farm

- Location within the East Riding of Yorkshire
- OS grid reference: SE891455
  - London: 165 mi (266 km) S
- Civil parish: Londesborough
- Unitary authority: East Riding of Yorkshire
- Ceremonial county: East Riding of Yorkshire
- Region: Yorkshire and the Humber
- Country: England
- Sovereign state: United Kingdom
- Post town: YORK
- Postcode district: YO43
- Dialling code: 01430
- Police: Humberside
- Fire: Humberside
- Ambulance: Yorkshire
- UK Parliament: Bridlington and The Wolds

Middlethorpe is a hamlet in the East Riding of Yorkshire, England. It is situated approximately 2.5 miles (4 km) north-east of the market town of Market Weighton. It lies to the southeast of the A614 road and consists principally of Middlethorpe Farm.

Middlethorpe forms part of the civil parish of Londesborough.
