= Mark Briggs (politician) =

New Zealand politician and pacifist (1884–1965)

The Honourable Mark Briggs MLC
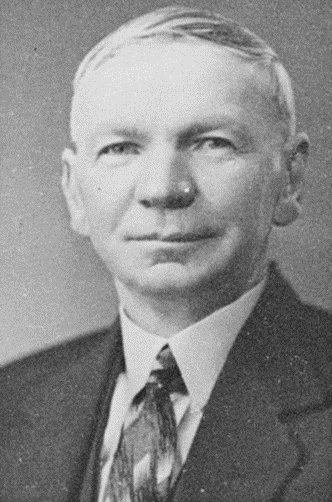

Member of the Legislative Council
- In office 9 March 1936 – 8 March 1950

Personal details
- Born: 6 April 1884 Londesborough, Yorkshire, England
- Died: 15 March 1965 (aged 80) New Zealand
- Party: Labour Party

Mark Briggs (6 April 1884 – 15 March 1965) was a New Zealand labourer, auctioneer, pacifist, socialist and politician. He was born in Londesborough, Yorkshire, England, on 6 April 1884.

In World War I, he was one of the group of 14 New Zealand conscientious objectors, notably including Archibald Baxter, forcibly enlisted, sent to the front in France, and maltreated.

He was a member of the Legislative Council from 9 March 1936 to 8 March 1950.
