= All Saints' Church, Londesborough =

Church in Londesborough, East Riding of Yorkshire, England

Coordinates: 53°53′50″N 0°40′47″W

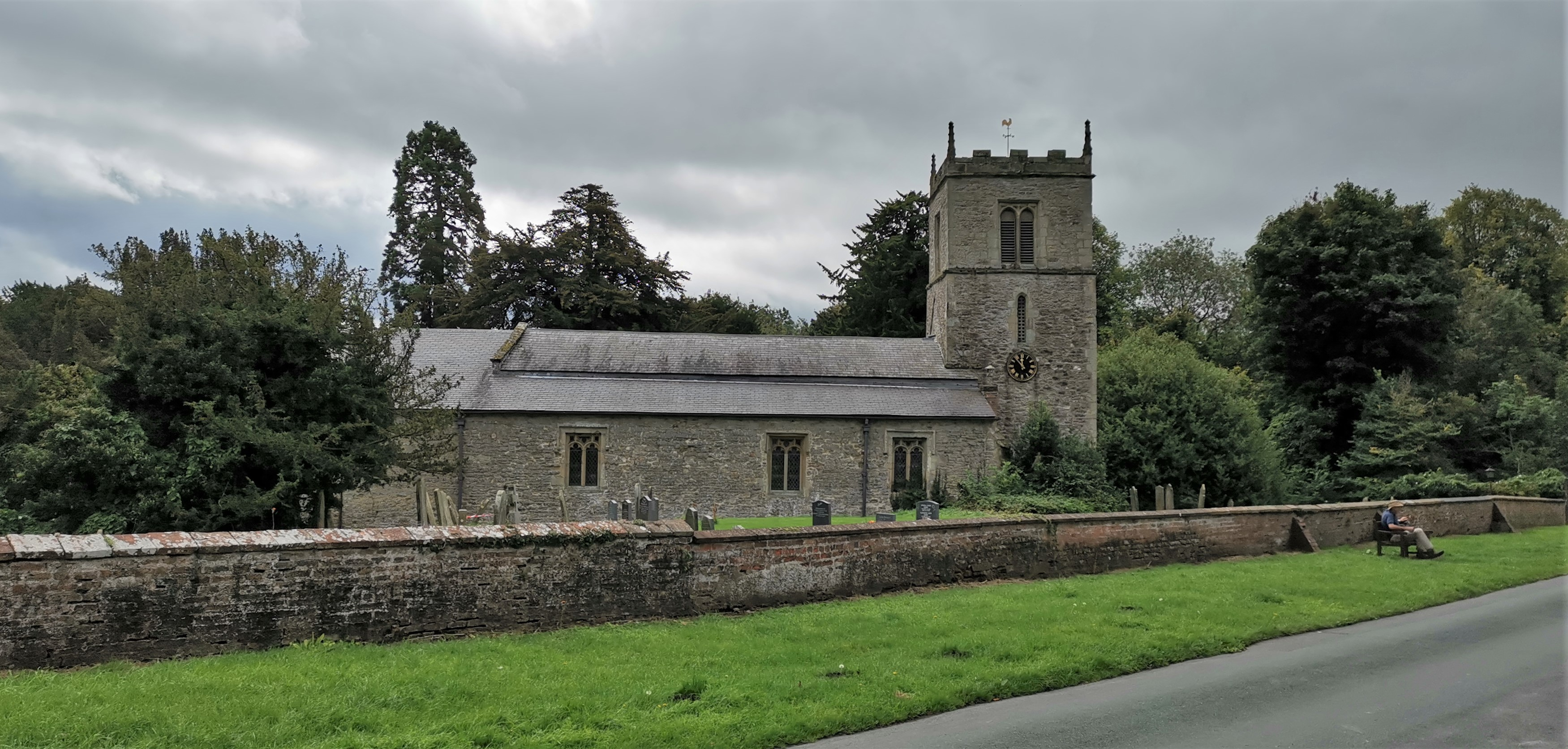
The church, in 2020

All Saints' Church is the parish church of Londesborough, a village in the East Riding of Yorkshire, in England.

The church was built in the early 12th century, probably by Herbert the Chamberlain, who later granted it to his son, Saint William of York. The nave survives from this period, while the tower, chancel and north aisle were rebuilt in the 14th century. The tower was heightened in the 15th century, and a porch was built in 1678. The building was restored in 1873, and again, by Temple Moore, in 1885. It was grade I listed in 1967.

The church is built of stone, with freestone dressings, and slate roofs, and consists of a nave, a north aisle, a south porch, a chancel with a north chapel, and a west tower. The tower has three stages, a projecting stair turret to the southwest, quoins, lancet windows, a chamfered string course, square-headed two-light bell openings, and an embattled parapet with corner finials. The south doorway is Norman with one order, columns with scallop capitals, a lintel, and a sundial in the tympanum, above which is a 9th to 10th-century cross head with interlace decoration. Inside, there is a pulpit carved in 1719 and an elaborate rood screen designed by Temple Moore. There is a brass memorial to Richard Boyle, 3rd Earl of Burlington, who died in 1753. Under the chancel is the crypt where member of the Boyle family are buried.

== See also ==
- Grade I listed buildings in the East Riding of Yorkshire
- Listed buildings in Londesborough
