= Listed buildings in Wetwang =

Wetwang is a civil parish in the county of the East Riding of Yorkshire, England. It contains six listed buildings that are recorded in the National Heritage List for England. Of these, one is listed at Grade II*, the middle of the three grades, and the others are at Grade II, the lowest grade. The parish contains the village of Wetwang and the surrounding area. All the listed buildings are in the village, and consist of a church, a graveslab in the churchyard, two farmhouses, outbuildings and a house.

== Key ==
Grade	Criteria
II*	Particularly important buildings of more than special interest
II	Buildings of national importance and special interest

== Buildings ==
Name and location	Photograph	Date	Notes	Grade
St Nicholas' Church; 54.01903°N 0.57773°W		12th century	The church has been altered and enlarged through the centuries, including restorations and alterations by C. Hodgson Fowler between 1895 and 1902. It is built in limestone with a lead roof, and consists of a nave, a north aisle, a north transseptal chapel, a chancel with a north organ chamber, and a west tower. The tower has two stages, a stepped and chamfered plinth, clasping buttresses, a southeast stair turret with blocked slit windows, a west lancet window, a band, two-light bell openings, a decorated corbel table, and a projecting embattled parapet with mouchette decoration, and merlons with pierced quatrefoils.	II*
Graveslab to two children 54.01917°N 0.57795°W	—	17th to 18th century (probable)	The graveslab is in the churchyard of St Nicholas' Church, to the north of the church. It is in sandstone, with an oblong plan and sides of about 1 metre (3 ft 3 in) and 0.5 metres (1 ft 8 in). On the slab are worn effigies of two swaddled children.	II
Manor Farmhouse; 54.01939°N 0.57701°W	—	Early to mid-18th century	The farmhouse is in reddish-brown brick, colourwashed on the front, with limestone and brick on the right gable end, a dentilled cornice, and swept roofs of tile and pantile with brick copings, and tumbled-in brick to the gable ends. There are two storeys and five bays and a right range of one storey and an attic, and two bays. The main doorway has fluted pilasters, a divided fanlight, a frieze and a hood. On the right bay is a bow window, and the other windows are sashes. The right range has a doorway with a segmental arch, and it contains casement windows.	II
Woods Farmhouse; 54.01961°N 0.57743°W		18th century (probable)	The farmhouse is in colourwashed pinkish-brown brick, with a floor band and a swept pantile roof. There are two storeys and attics, and three bays, and later additions to the right and the rear. The doorway has pilasters, a divided fanlight and a hood, and the windows are sashes under flat arches of rubbed brick.	II
Outbuildings east of Thorndale Farmhouse; 54.01911°N 0.57960°W		18th century	The outbuildings, which were extended in the 19th century, and later converted for residential use, are in reddish-brown brick and clunch, with quoins, and swept pantile roofs with brick copings and tumbled-in brick to the gable ends. There is a single storey and four bays, and a two-storey range at right angles to the north. The main range contains various openings, and on the north range are windows under cambered heads.	II
Wetwang House; 54.01937°N 0.57614°W		Early 19th century	The house is in reddish-brown brick, with stone dressings, a modillion eaves cornice, and a stone slate roof with stone copings. There are two storeys and three bays, the middle bay projecting under a pediment, and an earlier rear range with a pantile roof. In the centre is a Doric porch with a frieze and a cornice, and a doorway in a recessed semicircular-arched surround, with a decorative fanlight. The windows are sashes under channelled lintels, the window above the porch in an elliptically arched surround.	II
