= 2015 Tour de Yorkshire =

1st men's Tour de Yorkshire

2015 UCI Europe Tour

Race details
- Dates: 1–3 May
- Stages: 3
- Distance: 515 km (320 mi)
- Winning time: 12h 47' 56"

Results
| Jersey awarded to the overall winner | Winner | Lars Petter Nordhaug (NOR) | (Team Sky) |
| | Second | Samuel Sánchez (ESP) | (BMC Racing Team) |
| | Third | Thomas Voeckler (FRA) | (Team Europcar) |
| Jersey awarded to the points classification winner | Points | Lars Petter Nordhaug (NOR) | (Team Sky) |
| Jersey awarded to the mountains classification winner | Mountains | Nicolas Edet (FRA) | (Cofidis) |
| | Team | Team Sky | |

The 2015 Tour de Yorkshire was a cycling stage race that took place in Yorkshire in May 2015. It was the first edition of the Tour de Yorkshire and was organised by Welcome to Yorkshire and the Amaury Sport Organisation, who also organised the Yorkshire stages of the 2014 Tour de France. The race started in Bridlington on 1 May and ended in Leeds on 3 May. It included three stages and was rated as a 2.1 event as part of the 2015 UCI Europe Tour.

The first stage of the race was won by Lars Petter Nordhaug (Team Sky) in a sprint from a small group. He kept his lead through the second stage, which ended in a bunch sprint, and was able to extend it slightly in the third and final stage of the race. He won the general classification in the race by eleven seconds. Samuel Sánchez (BMC Racing Team) was second and Thomas Voeckler (Team Europcar) was third. Nordhaug also won the points classification and Team Sky won the teams classification. The mountains classification was won by Nicolas Edet (Cofidis).

== Race route ==
The race was first discussed publicly in July 2014, after the first stages of the Tour de France that took place in Yorkshire. It was organised by the Amaury Sport Organisation, the organisers of the Tour de France, and Welcome to Yorkshire, who had been the organisers of the Yorkshire stages of the 2014 Tour de France. On 22 December 2014, the start and finish locations for the event were released, these were Bridlington, Leeds, Scarborough, Selby, Wakefield and York. On 21 January 2015, details of the three stages of the route were unveiled at the Bridlington Spa. The first two stages (especially the second) were expected to suit the sprinters, while the third stage was described as the "queen stage". It included several roads and climbs that had been part of the second stage of the 2014 Tour de France between York and Sheffield. The stage was rated as a 2.1 event.

There was also a women's race that took place as part of the Tour de Yorkshire event. This took place on the second day of the men's race over four laps of the 20-kilometre (12-mile) route around York that was also the final part of the men's racing that day. Lizzie Armitstead, who did not compete in the event due to a conflicting event in Europe, expressed a hope that the women's race in future would be a three-day event like the men's race. The women's race was won by Louise Mahé (Ikon–Mazda) in a sprint finish.

Stage characteristics and winners
| Stage | Date | Start | Finish | Length | Type | Winner |
|---|---|---|---|---|---|---|
| 1 | 1 May | Bridlington | Scarborough | 174 km (108.1 miles) | Hilly stage | Lars Petter Nordhaug (NOR) |
| 2 | 2 May | Selby | York | 174 km (108.1 miles) | Flat stage | Moreno Hofland (NED) |
| 3 | 3 May | Wakefield | Leeds | 167 km (103.8 miles) | Intermediate stage | Ben Hermans (BEL) |

== Teams ==
18 teams were selected to take part in the inaugural Tour de Yorkshire. Five of these were UCI WorldTeams; six were UCI Professional Continental teams; six were UCI Continental teams, with the Great Britain national team completing the field. Teams could enter between five and eight riders. Fourteen teams selected eight riders and four teams selected seven; 140 riders were therefore entered into the race. One rider (Caleb Fairly of Team Giant–Alpecin) pulled out before the start, so the race began with a peloton of 139 riders.

UCI WorldTeams

- BMC Racing Team
- Team Sky
- IAM Cycling
- Team Giant–Alpecin
- LottoNL–Jumbo

UCI Professional Continental teams

- Cofidis
- Cult Energy Pro Cycling
- MTN–Qhubeka
- Team Europcar
- Topsport Vlaanderen–Baloise
- Team Roompot

UCI Continental teams

- ONE Pro Cycling
- NFTO
- WIGGINS
- Madison Genesis
- JLT–Condor
- Team Raleigh

National teams

- Great Britain

== Pre-race expectations ==
Much of the pre-race media focused on the presence of Bradley Wiggins, Britain's first ever winner of the Tour de France, who was riding his first race for his new team, WIGGINS. Wiggins was controversially not selected for Team Sky in the previous year's Tour de France; the race organisers expected his presence in the Tour de Yorkshire to be one of the principal attractions for British cycling fans. Wiggins was not, however, expected to attempt to win the overall classification in the race; his main objective was preparing for his hour record attempt in June.

Cycling Weekly expected that the race would be dominated by "punchy all-rounders". The riders expected to perform strongly over the three days included Ben Swift (Team Sky), Moreno Hofland and Steven Kruijswijk (both LottoNL–Jumbo), Greg Van Avermaet (BMC Racing Team), Thomas Voeckler (Team Europcar) and Erick Rowsell (Madison Genesis). The second stage appeared most likely to end in a sprint, with Marcel Kittel (Team Giant–Alpecin) the favourite to take victory, although he had suffered an illness and had not raced since the Tour of Qatar in February. Other prominent sprinters included Swift and Hofland, as well as Matteo Pelucchi (IAM Cycling), Rick Zabel (BMC Racing Team), Gerald Ciolek (MTN–Qhubeka) and Steele Von Hoff (NFTO).

== Stages ==
=== Stage 1 ===
1 May 2015 — Bridlington to Scarborough, 174 km (108 mi)

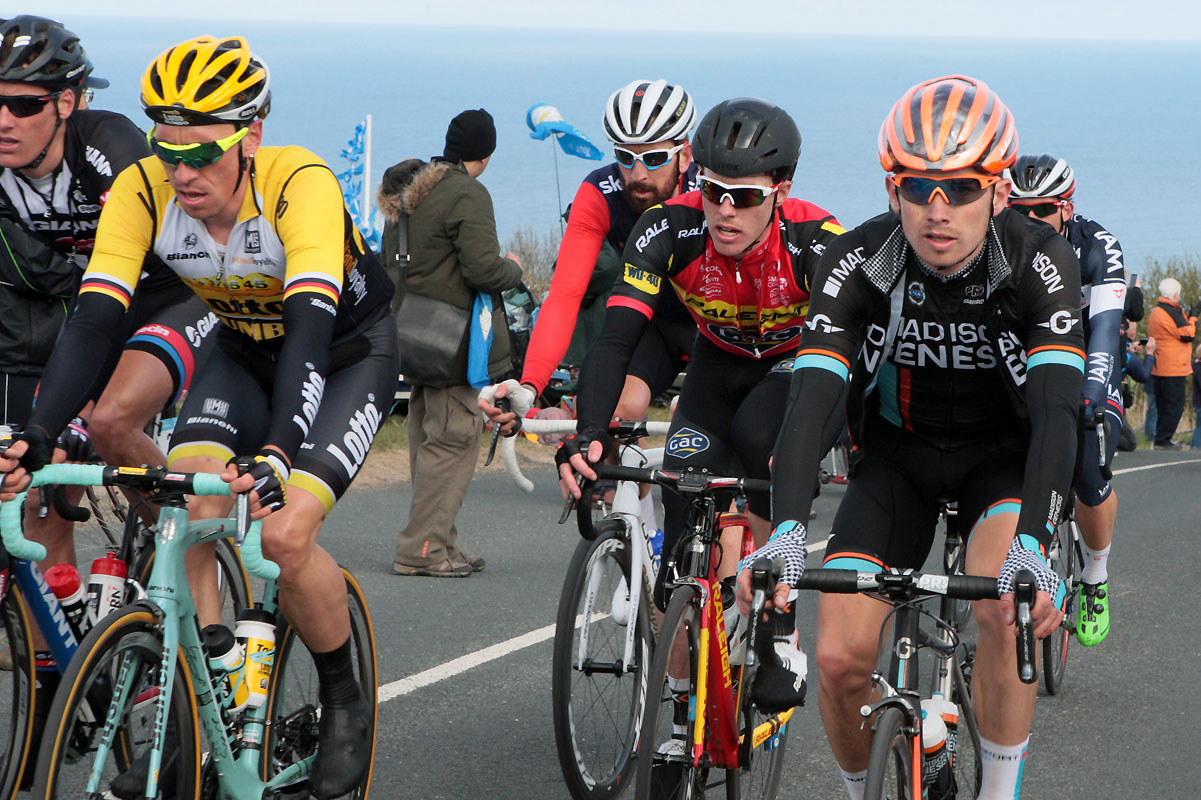
Bradley Wiggins (third from the left) in a small group during stage one

The first stage of the race began in Bridlington on the North Sea coast. The riders first travelled north-east to Flamborough, where they turned to the north-west. Initially this kept them along the coast, but soon took them into the North York Moors, where the first climb was the Côte de Dalby Forest. This came after 51.5 kilometres (32.0 miles); the categorised portion of the climb was 0.6 kilometres (0.37 miles) at 8.9%. The riders then turned to the south-west and descended to Pickering, where the first intermediate sprint was positioned. The route turned north, back onto the Moors, where they reached the Côte de Rosedale Abbey after 92 kilometres (57 miles). This was the longest climb of the day: 2.8 kilometres (1.7 mi) at 7%. The riders continued north as far as Castleton, where they turned east. After 123.5 kilometres (76.7 miles), the riders climbed the Côte de Grosmont (0.4 kilometres (0.25 miles) at 16.9%), then the Côte de Briggswath (1.3 kilometres (0.81 miles) at 6.2%). From here, they returned to the coast at Whitby, where there was another intermediate sprint; the riders then turned south. The final climb of the day came after 146.5 kilometres (91.0 miles); it was the Côte de Robin Hood's Bay (1.5 kilometres (0.93 miles) at 10.3%). The riders then continued south to the finish line in Scarborough, doing a loop around the town before finishing on the sea front. In total the day included 2,000 metres (6,600 ft) of climbing, although the highest point was just 350 metres (1,150 ft) above sea level. Thomas Voeckler (Team Europcar) described the stage as "much tougher than we thought" due to the small roads.

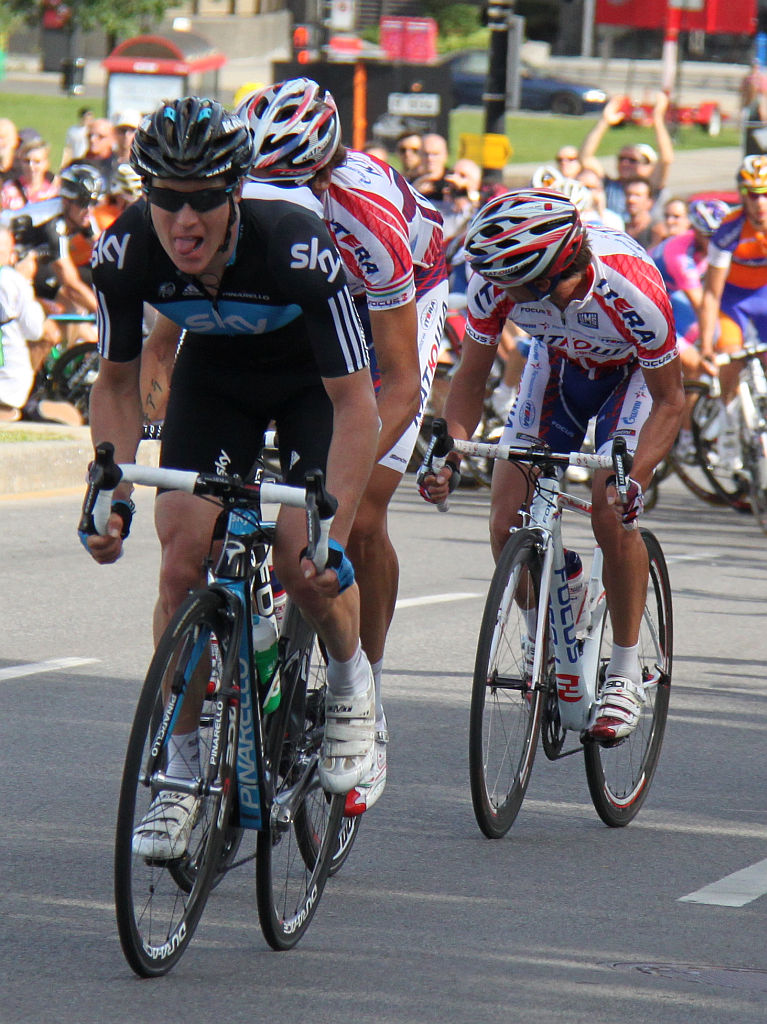
Lars Petter Nordhaug (pictured in 2011) won the inaugural stage of the race

An initial breakaway was formed by Mark Christian (WIGGINS), Loïc Chetout (Cofidis), Eddie Dunbar (NFTO), Mark Stewart (Madison Genesis) and Rasmus Quaade (Cult Energy Pro Cycling). They built up a five-minute lead but Team Sky chased hard; the break's lead was reduced to a few seconds by the Côte de Rosedale Abbey. A new breakaway was formed here by Perrig Quéméneur (Team Europcar) and Tim Declercq (Topsport Vlaanderen–Baloise), while Marcel Kittel (Team Giant–Alpecin) was dropped and abandoned the race shortly afterwards. With 50 kilometres (31 miles) remaining, the peloton descended into Egton in wet conditions. Team Sky were riding at the front of the peloton, but their riders Ben Swift and Ian Boswell, and Dunbar crashed. Dunbar suffered a broken clavicle and Swift a shoulder injury: both were forced to abandon the race.

The crucial move of the race came with 40 kilometres (25 miles) remaining as the race went through Whitby, as a 15-man group formed. This was reduced to five riders on the Côte de Robin Hood's Bay. Philip Deignan (Team Sky) rode hard on the climb, with only Stéphane Rossetto (Cofidis), Samuel Sánchez (BMC Racing Team), Voeckler, and Deignan's teammate Lars Petter Nordhaug able to follow him. Despite attacks on the way into Scarborough, these five riders came to the finish line together. Nordhaug won the sprint ahead of Voeckler and Rossetto. The peloton was more than a minute behind; the sprint was won by Greg Van Avermaet (BMC Racing Team). Thanks to bonus seconds, Nordhaug led the race by four seconds ahead of Voeckler. He also led the points classification. The mountains classification was led by Quéméneur. Quéméneur was also awarded the combativity prize after the online vote: Dunbar won the vote, but was unable to receive the prize because he had been hospitalised, and abandoned the race, due to his crash.

Stage 1 result
| Rank | Rider | Team | Time |
|---|---|---|---|
| 1 | Lars Petter Nordhaug (NOR) | Team Sky | 4h 22' 38" |
| 2 | Thomas Voeckler (FRA) | Team Europcar | + 0" |
| 3 | Stéphane Rossetto (FRA) | Cofidis | + 0" |
| 4 | Samuel Sánchez (ESP) | BMC Racing Team | + 0" |
| 5 | Philip Deignan (IRL) | Team Sky | + 0" |
| 6 | Greg Van Avermaet (BEL) | BMC Racing Team | + 1' 10" |
| 7 | Anthony Turgis (FRA) | Cofidis | + 1' 10" |
| 8 | Erick Rowsell (GBR) | Madison Genesis | + 1' 10" |
| 9 | Richard Handley (GBR) | JLT–Condor | + 1' 10" |
| 10 | Huub Duyn (NED) | Team Roompot | + 1' 10" |

General classification after stage 1
| Rank | Rider | Team | Time |
|---|---|---|---|
| 1 | Lars Petter Nordhaug (NOR) | Team Sky | 4h 22' 28" |
| 2 | Thomas Voeckler (FRA) | Team Europcar | + 4" |
| 3 | Stéphane Rossetto (FRA) | Cofidis | + 6" |
| 4 | Samuel Sánchez (ESP) | BMC Racing Team | + 10" |
| 5 | Philip Deignan (IRL) | Team Sky | + 10" |
| 6 | Anthony Turgis (FRA) | Cofidis | + 1' 18" |
| 7 | Greg Van Avermaet (BEL) | BMC Racing Team | + 1' 20" |
| 8 | Erick Rowsell (GBR) | Madison Genesis | + 1' 20" |
| 9 | Richard Handley (GBR) | JLT–Condor | + 1' 20" |
| 10 | Huub Duyn (NED) | Team Roompot | + 1' 20" |

=== Stage 2 ===
2 May 2015 — Selby to York, 174 km (108 mi)

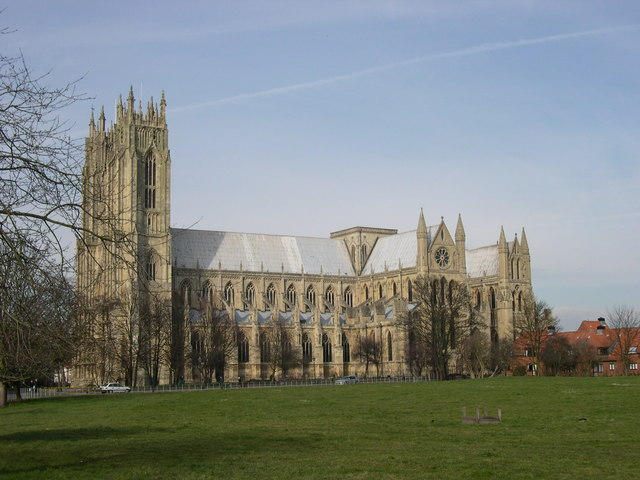
Beverley Minster

The second stage of the race, which was much flatter than the first and third stages, began in Selby, North Yorkshire. The stage began with an 8.2-kilometre (5.1-mile) neutralised section, which included a loop around the town centre; the racing started as the riders headed east for 25 kilometres (16 miles) towards Market Weighton. Here they turned south and climbed the first of the day's two categorised climbs; this was the Côte de North Newbald (1.2 kilometres (0.75 miles) at 5.3%). The route again turned east and the riders reached Beverley after 45 kilometres (28 miles). From here the route turned north and entered the Yorkshire Wolds; there was an intermediate sprint as the route passed through Wetwang. Immediately after the intermediate sprint came the second climb of the day, the Côte de Fimber (1.1 kilometres (0.68 miles) at 6.2%). At the summit of the climb, there were 78.5 kilometres (48.8 miles) to the finish line. The riders continued north as far as Malton, then turned south-west towards York. The race concluded in York with a 20.5-kilometre (12.7-mile) finishing circuit. The riders entered the circuit with 52.5 kilometres (32.6 miles) to the end of the stage and rode the 11.5 kilometres (7.1 miles) to the finishing line, where the second intermediate sprint of the day took place. They then rode two complete laps of the circuit; the race finished with the third crossing of the finish line, after 174 kilometres (108 miles).

An early breakaway of 18 riders formed. This included Philip Deignan (Team Sky), who had been in the winning break in the first stage and was 10 seconds off the race lead. The other teams in the peloton were not willing to let a breakaway that included Deignan go; eventually he and nine others dropped back to the main peloton. Eight riders were therefore left in the lead group: Andy Tennant (WIGGINS), Bert De Backer (Team Giant–Alpecin), Stijn Steels (Topsport Vlaanderen–Baloise), Giovanni Bernaudeau (Team Europcar), Matt Brammeier (MTN–Qhubeka), Nicolas Edet (Cofidis), Ivar Slik (Team Roompot) and Mark McNally (Madison Genesis). McNally won both categorised climbs. The break's lead was nearly seven minutes with 78.5 kilometres (48.8 miles) remaining; Team Sky and IAM Cycling began chasing hard and reduced the gap sharply; the breakaway had less than two minutes' lead as they entered the laps around York.

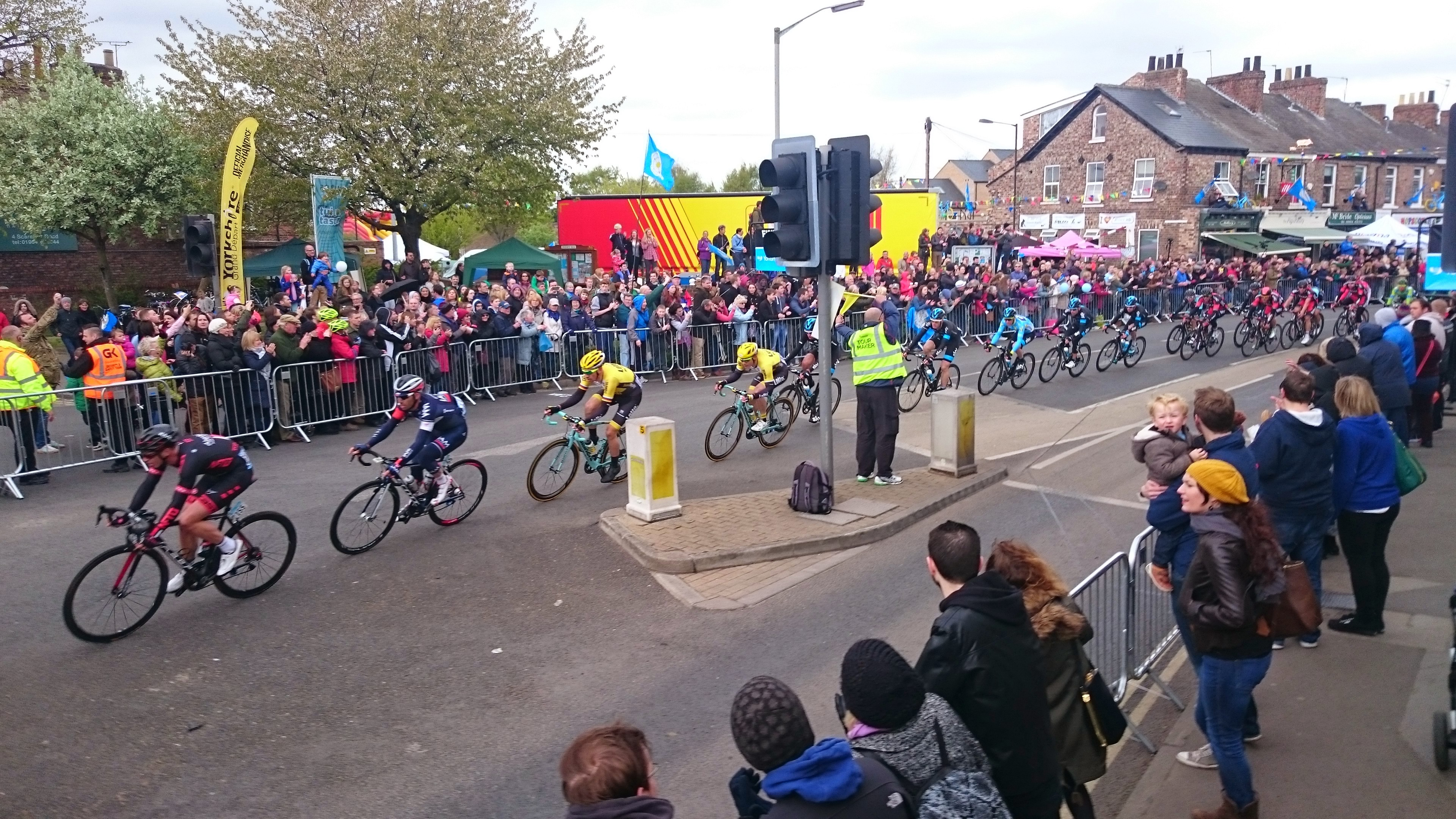
The peloton on the finishing circuit in York

The breakaway split up; McNally and De Backer remained alone in the lead with 11 kilometres (6.8 miles) left. McNally was voted as the day's most combative rider through a Twitter vote, but he was unable to stay with De Backer in the final 5.5 kilometres (3.4 miles). De Backer continued alone; he was briefly joined by Loïc Chetout (Cofidis) but the pair were unable to stay away from the chasing pack. As they were caught, with 700 metres (2,300 ft) remaining, Greg Van Avermaet attacked. Although he appeared to have a lead large enough to secure the stage victory, he ran out of energy shortly before the line and was caught by the sprinters. The first of these was Moreno Hofland (LottoNL–Jumbo), who took his team's first victory of the year, with Matteo Pelucchi (IAM Cycling) second and Ramon Sinkeldam (Team Giant–Alpecin) third. Due to a split in the peloton, Voeckler and Rossetto both lost six seconds. Samuel Sánchez therefore moved up into second place overall, while Nordhaug's lead increased to ten seconds.

Stage 2 result
| Rank | Rider | Team | Time |
|---|---|---|---|
| 1 | Moreno Hofland (NED) | LottoNL–Jumbo | 3h 57' 58" |
| 2 | Matteo Pelucchi (ITA) | IAM Cycling | + 0" |
| 3 | Ramon Sinkeldam (NED) | Team Giant–Alpecin | + 0" |
| 4 | Jempy Drucker (LUX) | BMC Racing Team | + 0" |
| 5 | Dylan Groenewegen (NED) | Team Roompot | + 0" |
| 6 | André Looij (NED) | Team Roompot | + 0" |
| 7 | Russell Downing (GBR) | Cult Energy Pro Cycling | + 0" |
| 8 | Andreas Stauff (GER) | MTN–Qhubeka | + 0" |
| 9 | Harry Tanfield (GBR) | JLT–Condor | + 0" |
| 10 | Pieter Vanspeybrouck (BEL) | Topsport Vlaanderen–Baloise | + 0" |

General classification after stage 2
| Rank | Rider | Team | Time |
|---|---|---|---|
| 1 | Lars Petter Nordhaug (NOR) | Team Sky | 8h 20' 26" |
| 2 | Samuel Sánchez (ESP) | BMC Racing Team | + 10" |
| 3 | Thomas Voeckler (FRA) | Team Europcar | + 10" |
| 4 | Stéphane Rossetto (FRA) | Cofidis | + 12" |
| 5 | Philip Deignan (IRL) | Team Sky | + 16" |
| 6 | Anthony Turgis (FRA) | Cofidis | + 1' 18" |
| 7 | Greg Van Avermaet (BEL) | BMC Racing Team | + 1' 20" |
| 8 | Erick Rowsell (GBR) | Madison Genesis | + 1' 20" |
| 9 | Ben Hermans (BEL) | BMC Racing Team | + 1' 23" |
| 10 | Richard Handley (GBR) | JLT–Condor | + 1' 26" |

=== Stage 3 ===
3 May 2015 — Wakefield to Leeds, 167 km (104 mi)

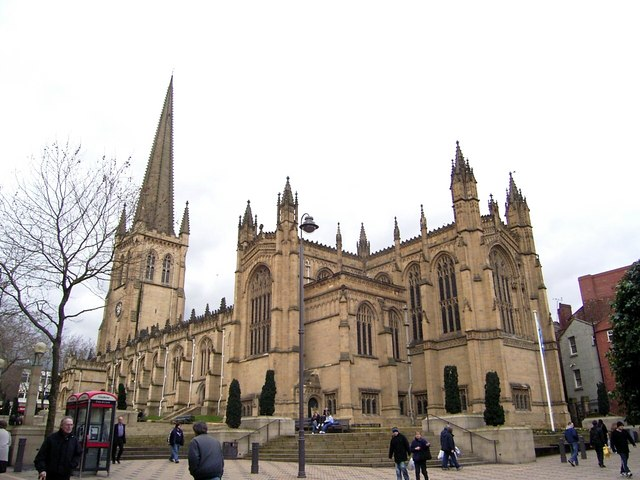
Wakefield Cathedral

The third stage was the queen stage of the race and included several of the roads used in stage 2 of the 2014 Tour de France. The stage began in Wakefield, West Yorkshire, outside the city's cathedral; there was a neutralised lap of the city centre before the riders left the city to the south. The route passed through Sandal Magna and reached Barnsley after 8 kilometres (5.0 miles). Here the roads turned west and entered the Pennines. The first climb of the day came after 40 kilometres (25 miles): this was the Côte de Holmfirth (2.9 kilometres (1.8 miles) at 5.5%). From here the route was twisting, though it generally travelled north as it passed to the west of Huddersfield and Halifax. The next climb, the Côte de Scapegoat Hill (2.2 kilometres (1.4 miles) at 8.3%), came after 55.5 kilometres (34.5 miles) of racing. The riders briefly left Yorkshire for the only time in the race (the route entered Greater Manchester but immediately returned to West Yorkshire). The roads were hilly throughout, with barely any flat road. The next categorised climb was the Côte de Hebden Bridge (4.1 kilometres (2.5 miles) at 5.5%) after 95 kilometres (59 miles) with the Côte de Goose Eye (1.3 kilometres (0.81 miles) at 10%) shortly afterwards. After 129.5 kilometres (80.5 miles), there was an intermediate sprint in Ilkley, then the Côte de Cow and Calf (1.8 kilometres (1.1 miles) at 8%). At the top of the climb, there were 35.5 kilometres (22.1 miles) to the finish line. The final categorised climb of the race, the Côte de The Chevin (1.4 kilometres (0.87 miles) at 10.3%), was 24 kilometres (15 miles) from the finish; there was also a slight climb to the second intermediate sprint in Arthington. There was then a fairly flat 15 kilometres (9.3 miles) section to the finish line in Leeds, with the finish line in Roundhay Park.

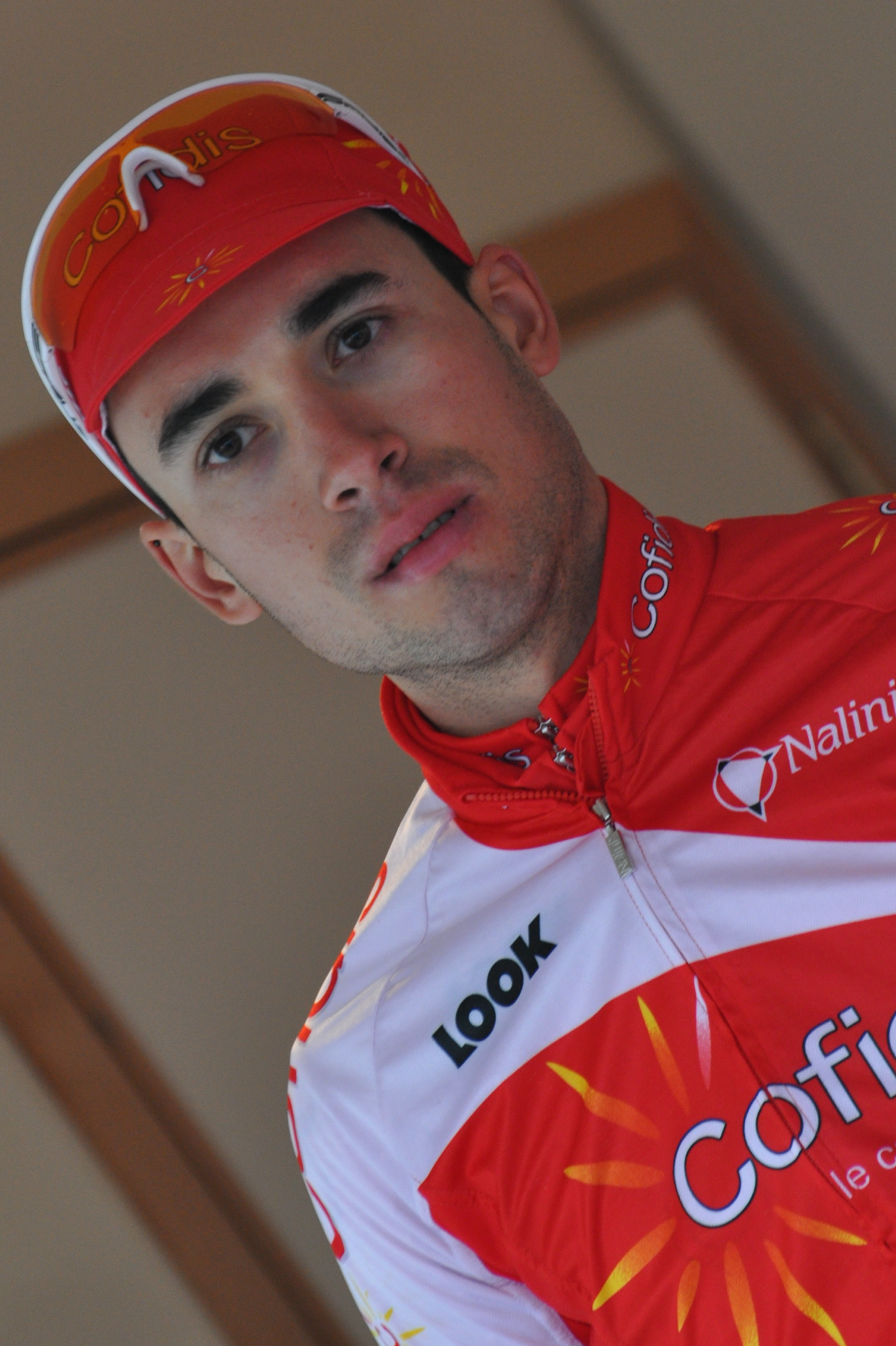
Nicolas Edet (pictured in 2012), winner of the mountains classification

The day's main breakaway was formed by Lawson Craddock (Team Giant–Alpecin), Sondre Holst Enger (IAM Cycling), Reinardt Janse van Rensburg (MTN–Qhubeka), Nicolas Edet (Cofidis), James McLaughlin (Madison Genesis), Ian Bibby (NFTO and Rasmus Quaade (Cult Energy Pro Cycling). They built a lead of around five minutes ahead of the peloton, which was led by Team Sky. Bibby won the first three climbs of the day; the group then split apart on the Côte de Goose Eye. Craddock was the first to cross the summit with only Edet able to follow him. With less than 50 kilometres (31 miles) to the finish line, the two riders had a lead of nearly five minutes. Edet won the next two climbs and secured victory in the mountains classification.

With 35.5 kilometres (22.1 miles) remaining, the gap was about 90 seconds as Team Sky's David López, Ian Boswell and Philip Deignan led the remaining part of the peloton. Josh Edmondson (Great Britain) made an unsuccessful attack from this group. On the uncategorised climb leading up to the final sprint of the day, Craddock dropped Edet and continued alone. In the peloton, Samuel Sánchez also attacked on the climb. Nordhaug followed him and won the final bonus second, putting him more than ten seconds ahead of Sánchez. Steve Cummings (MTN–Qhubeka) and Steven Kruijswijk (LottoNL–Jumbo) attacked together after the climb; they too were unsuccessful. The final attack of the day came from Ben Hermans (BMC Racing Team) with approximately 11 kilometres (6.8 miles) to the finish line. He caught and passed Craddock 6 kilometres (3.7 miles) later; meanwhile Team Sky led the group without making any particular effort to chase Hermans down. Hermans took a solo victory; the 17-man group was nine seconds behind. Teammate Greg Van Avermaet won the sprint for second, with Julien Simon third. Nordhaug finished in fifth to secure victory overall and in the points classification. Team Sky also won the teams classification. Edet won the mountains classification. The final stage combativity prize was won by Bibby.

Stage 3 result
| Rank | Rider | Team | Time |
|---|---|---|---|
| 1 | Ben Hermans (BEL) | BMC Racing Team | 4h 27' 22" |
| 2 | Greg Van Avermaet (BEL) | BMC Racing Team | + 9" |
| 3 | Julien Simon (FRA) | Cofidis | + 9" |
| 4 | Samuel Sánchez (ESP) | BMC Racing Team | + 9" |
| 5 | Huub Duyn (NED) | Team Roompot | + 9" |
| 6 | Lars Petter Nordhaug (NOR) | Team Sky | + 9" |
| 7 | Alex Kirsch (LUX) | Cult Energy Pro Cycling | + 9" |
| 8 | Thomas Sprengers (BEL) | Topsport Vlaanderen–Baloise | + 9" |
| 9 | Steven Kruijswijk (NED) | LottoNL–Jumbo | + 9" |
| 10 | Thomas Voeckler (FRA) | Team Europcar | + 9" |

Final general classification
| Rank | Rider | Team | Time |
|---|---|---|---|
| 1 | Lars Petter Nordhaug (NOR) | Team Sky | 12h 47' 56" |
| 2 | Samuel Sánchez (ESP) | BMC Racing Team | + 11" |
| 3 | Thomas Voeckler (FRA) | Team Europcar | + 11" |
| 4 | Stéphane Rossetto (FRA) | Cofidis | + 13" |
| 5 | Philip Deignan (IRL) | Team Sky | + 24" |
| 6 | Ben Hermans (BEL) | BMC Racing Team | + 1' 05" |
| 7 | Greg Van Avermaet (BEL) | BMC Racing Team | + 1' 15" |
| 8 | Erick Rowsell (GBR) | Madison Genesis | + 1' 21" |
| 9 | Huub Duyn (NED) | Team Roompot | + 1' 27" |
| 10 | Richard Handley (GBR) | JLT–Condor | + 1' 27" |

== Classification leadership table ==
The race included three individual classifications and a team classification. The most important of these was the general classification. This was calculated by adding up each cyclist's finishing times on each stage. Bonus seconds were awarded for top-three placings in each stage (10 seconds for the first rider, 6 seconds for the second, 4 seconds for the third) and for placings in intermediate sprints (3 seconds for the first rider, 2 seconds for the second, 1 second for the third). The rider with the lowest cumulative time after taking bonus seconds into account was the leader of the classification and was awarded a blue and yellow – colours traditionally associated with Yorkshire – jersey. The winner of the general classification was considered the winner of the race.

The second classification was the points classification. On each stage of the race, points were awarded to the top 10 riders. The winner won 15 points, with 12 for the second-placed rider, 9 for the third-placed rider, 7 for the sixth-placed rider and then one point fewer for each place down to tenth place. Points were also awarded to the top three riders at intermediate sprints, with five points for the winner of the sprint, three points for the rider in second place, and one point for the rider in third place. The rider with the most points was the leader of the classification and was awarded a green jersey. There was also a mountains classification. Over the three stages, there were 13 categorised climbs. On each of these climbs, the first four riders to the summit were awarded points, with 5 for the first rider, 3 for the second, 2 for the third and 1 for the fourth. The rider with the most accumulated points was the leader of the classification and was awarded a dark pink jersey.

The final classification was a team classification. The team's time on each was calculated by taking the best three riders from that team and adding their times together; the team with the lowest cumulative time was the leader of the classification. Another jersey was awarded at the end of each stage. This was a combativity prize and was to be awarded to the rider who "made the greatest effort and [...] demonstrated the best qualities in terms of sportsmanship". A jury selected a list of riders to be eligible for the prize; the winner of the prize was then decided by a vote on Twitter. The rider was awarded a grey jersey.

| Stage | Winner | General classification | Points classification | Mountains classification | Combativity prize | Team classification |
|---|---|---|---|---|---|---|
| 1 | Lars Petter Nordhaug | Lars Petter Nordhaug | Lars Petter Nordhaug (Note: As Nordhaug also held the overall jersey, Thomas Voeckler wore the points jersey on the second stage, and Moreno Hofland wore the jersey on the third stage.) | Perrig Quéméneur | Perrig Quéméneur (Note: The Twitter vote for the combativity prize for stage 1 was won by Eddie Dunbar of NFTO, however he was unable to collect it as he had crashed out of the race with a broken clavicle. The prize was therefore awarded to Quéméneur, who had finished second in the vote. As Quéméneur also held the mountains jersey, Tim Declercq (who came third in the vote) wore the aggressive rider jersey on the second stage.) | Team Sky |
| 2 | Moreno Hofland | Lars Petter Nordhaug | Lars Petter Nordhaug | Perrig Quéméneur | Mark McNally | Team Sky |
| 3 | Ben Hermans | Lars Petter Nordhaug | Lars Petter Nordhaug | Nicolas Edet | Ian Bibby | Team Sky |
| Final | | Lars Petter Nordhaug | Lars Petter Nordhaug | Nicolas Edet | Not awarded | Team Sky |

== Final classifications ==
=== General classification ===
Final general classification
| Rank | Rider | Team | Time |
|---|---|---|---|
| 1 | Lars Petter Nordhaug (NOR) | Team Sky | 12h 47' 56" |
| 2 | Samuel Sánchez (ESP) | BMC Racing Team | + 11" |
| 3 | Thomas Voeckler (FRA) | Team Europcar | + 11" |
| 4 | Stéphane Rossetto (FRA) | Cofidis | + 13" |
| 5 | Philip Deignan (IRL) | Team Sky | + 24" |
| 6 | Ben Hermans (BEL) | BMC Racing Team | + 1' 05" |
| 7 | Greg Van Avermaet (BEL) | BMC Racing Team | + 1' 15" |
| 8 | Erick Rowsell (GBR) | Madison Genesis | + 1' 21" |
| 9 | Huub Duyn (NED) | Team Roompot | + 1' 27" |
| 10 | Richard Handley (GBR) | JLT–Condor | + 1' 27" |

=== Points classification ===
Final points classification
| Rank | Rider | Team | Points |
|---|---|---|---|
| 1 | Lars Petter Nordhaug (NOR) | Team Sky | 21 |
| 2 | Greg Van Avermaet (BEL) | BMC Racing Team | 17 |
| 3 | Ben Hermans (BEL) | BMC Racing Team | 15 |
| 4 | Moreno Hofland (NED) | LottoNL–Jumbo | 15 |
| 5 | Samuel Sánchez (ESP) | BMC Racing Team | 14 |
| 6 | Thomas Voeckler (FRA) | Team Europcar | 13 |
| 7 | Nicolas Edet (FRA) | Cofidis | 12 |
| 8 | Matteo Pelucchi (ITA) | IAM Cycling | 12 |
| 9 | Lawson Craddock (USA) | Team Giant–Alpecin | 10 |
| 10 | Ivar Slik (NED) | Team Roompot | 10 |

=== Mountains classification ===
Final mountains classification
| Rank | Rider | Team | Points |
|---|---|---|---|
| 1 | Nicolas Edet (FRA) | Cofidis | 26 |
| 2 | Ian Bibby (GBR) | NFTO | 16 |
| 3 | Lawson Craddock (USA) | Team Giant–Alpecin | 11 |
| 4 | Perrig Quéméneur (FRA) | Team Europcar | 10 |
| 5 | Mark McNally (GBR) | Madison Genesis | 10 |
| 6 | James McLaughlin (GBR) | Madison Genesis | 9 |
| 7 | Tom Stewart (GBR) | Madison Genesis | 7 |
| 8 | Samuel Sánchez (ESP) | BMC Racing Team | 6 |
| 9 | Lars Petter Nordhaug (NOR) | Team Sky | 3 |
| 10 | Philip Deignan (IRL) | Team Sky | 3 |

=== Teams classification ===
Final teams classification
| Rank | Team | Time |
|---|---|---|
| 1 | Team Sky | 38h 26' 03" |
| 2 | BMC Racing Team | + 32" |
| 3 | Cofidis | + 2' 25" |
| 4 | Cult Energy Pro Cycling | + 11' 01" |
| 5 | Team Europcar | + 15' 28" |
| 6 | Madison Genesis | + 17' 56" |
| 7 | Topsport Vlaanderen–Baloise | + 18' 55" |
| 8 | Great Britain | + 19' 13" |
| 9 | Team Raleigh | + 20' 26" |
| 10 | JLT–Condor | + 20' 39" |
