= Londesborough =

Village and civil parish in the East Riding of Yorkshire, England

Coordinates: 53°53′53″N 0°40′50″W

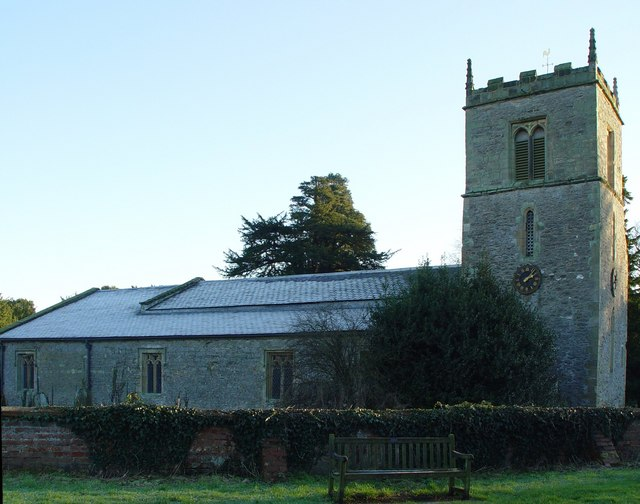
- All Saints Church, Londesborough

- Location within the East Riding of Yorkshire
- Population: 182 (2011 census)
- OS grid reference: SE868455
  - London: 165 mi (266 km) S
- Civil parish: Londesborough
- Unitary authority: East Riding of Yorkshire
- Ceremonial county: East Riding of Yorkshire
- Region: Yorkshire and the Humber
- Country: England
- Sovereign state: United Kingdom
- Post town: YORK
- Postcode district: YO43
- Dialling code: 01430
- Police: Humberside
- Fire: Humberside
- Ambulance: Yorkshire
- UK Parliament: Bridlington and The Wolds

Londesborough is a village and civil parish in the East Riding of Yorkshire, England. It is situated approximately 2.5 miles (4 km) north of the market town of Market Weighton. The civil parish is formed by the village of Londesborough and the hamlet of Middlethorpe. According to the 2011 UK census, Londesborough parish had a population of 182, a reduction of one on the 2001 UK census figure.

The name Londesborough derives from the Old Norse personal name Lothinn and the Old English burh meaning 'fortification'.

The Yorkshire Wolds Way National Trail, a long distance footpath passes through the village. Some scholars suggest the still-undiscovered Roman camp of Delgovicia is in the vicinity of Londesborough. Londesborough Hall was a country house in the village but all that now remains is the park land that surrounded the house which is called Londesborough Park. The Anglican All Saints' Church, Londesborough was designated a Grade I listed building in 1967 and is now recorded in the National Heritage List for England, maintained by Historic England. In 1823 Londesborough was a civil parish in the Holme Beacon Division in the Wapentake of Harthill. Londesborough is one of the sites in the East Riding that have been conjectured as the Romano-British town of Delgovicia, an eastern station associated with York. A Roman road from Brough on the Humber Estuary ran directly north to meet Londesborough estate and village, where were found Roman coins and burial repositories.

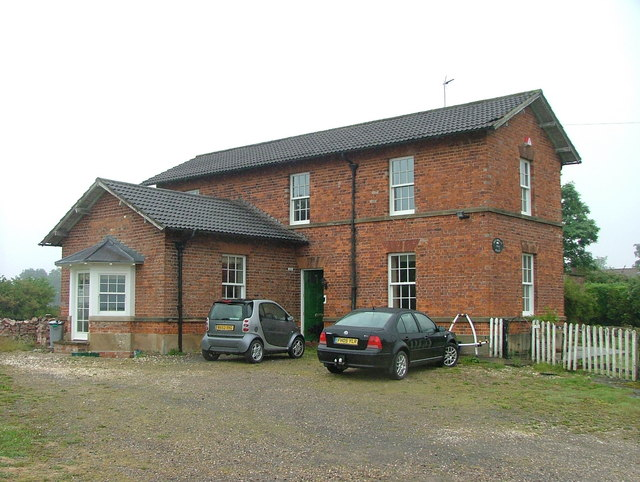
Former Railway Station

The estate of Londesborough was one of the seats of the Dukes of Devonshire. It was an historical possession of the Clifford family—Earls of Cumberland—until the 5th Earl's only heiress married the Earl of Cork, from whose family the Dukes of Devonshire are descended. The estate's mansion in 1823 had recently been demolished. The 6th Duke of Devonshire was the patron of All Saints' Church, the ecclesiastical parish living, and a hospital for "six old bachelors or widowers, and six widows". Londesborough population in 1823 was 244. Within the parish was a blacksmith, a clerk, a schoolmaster who was also the parish clerk, the parish rector, the agent for the Duke of Devonshire, and the landlord of The Devonshire Arms public house who was also a maltster. Londesborough was served by Londesborough railway station on the York to Beverley Line between 1847 and 1965.

== Notable people ==
- Mark Briggs, a notable Great War conscientious objector in New Zealand, was born in Londesborough in 1884. He emigrated to New Zealand with his father and brother, where he became a radical trade unionist and socialist. In 1917, he was forcibly shipped to France, where he was subjected to much pain and humiliation from the military to force him to give up his principles. He did not and was eventually returned to New Zealand. He later became a member of New Zealand's Legislative Council, where the former minister of war, James Allen, publicly apologised for his treatment.

== See also ==
- Listed buildings in Londesborough
