= Delgovicia =

Ancient town in Roman Britain

Delgovicia or Delgovitia was a Romano-British town in Britain, mentioned by the Antonine Itinerary as being east of Eboracum (Roman York). It is also mentioned by the Geographer of Ravenna as Devovicia or Devovitia. Its location is currently unknown. Several scholars have postulated various identifications for Delgovicia:

- In the 16th century the antiquarian William Camden identified Delgovicia with Market Weighton, which he called Wighton.
- William Smith also suggested that it was probably Market Weighton.
- Benjamin Pitts Capper suggested it was Londesborough.
- A. L. F. Rivet & Colin Smith suggest it was probably Wetwang.
- Others suggest the ruins at Millington.
- More recent scholarship has proposed Malton, North Yorkshire.
