= Listed buildings in Londesborough =

Londesborough is a civil parish in the county of the East Riding of Yorkshire, England. It contains ten listed buildings that are recorded in the National Heritage List for England. Of these, two are listed at Grade I, the highest of the three grades, one is at Grade II*, the middle grade, and the others are at Grade II, the lowest grade. The parish contains the village of Londesborough and the surrounding countryside. Until 1818–19, the most important building in the parish was Londesborough Hall, which has been demolished. A number of listed buildings are associated with the hall, in its gardens and in the surrounding Londesborough Park, and the others include a church, a stable block converted for housing, houses and cottages, and a group of almshouses.

== Key ==
Grade	Criteria
I	Buildings of exceptional interest, sometimes considered to be internationally important
II*	Particularly important buildings of more than special interest
II	Buildings of national importance and special interest

== Buildings ==
Name and location	Photograph	Date	Notes	Grade
All Saints' Church; 53.89736°N 0.67962°W		Early 12th century	The church has been altered and extended through the centuries, including a restoration in 1873, and another, by Temple Moore, in 1885. It is built in stone, with freestone dressings, and slate roofs, and consists of a nave, a north aisle, a south porch, a chancel with a north chapel, and a west tower. The tower has three stages, a projecting stair turret to the southwest, quoins, lancet windows, a chamfered string course, square-headed two-light bell openings, and an embattled parapet with corner finials. The south doorway is Norman with one order, columns with scallop capitals, a lintel, and a sundial in the tympanum, above which is a 9th to 10th-century cross head with interlace decoration.	I
Gates, gate piers, walls and abutments 53.89603°N 0.68329°W		17th century	The gateway is at the entrance to Londesborough Park from Londesborough Avenue. The gates are in wrought iron, and the gate piers are in rendered brick. Each pier has a moulded base, sunk panels, a volute on the gate side, a deep dentilled cornice and a ball finial. The flanking walls have a moulded plinth, and coping ramped to the piers under volutes, and the abutments have moulded bases, sunk panels to the faces, and a shallow cornice.	I
Stable Court; 53.8984°N 0.67805°W		Late 17th century	A stable block, later four houses, in red brick, with stone at the rear, on a chamfered plinth, with stone dressings, a moulded timber eaves cornice, and a hipped slate roof. There is one storey and seven bays. The doorway has an eared architrave, a pulvinated frieze, and a segmental pediment, flanked by full-height Ionic pilasters, carrying an entablature and a pulvinated frieze with a monogram. The windows are mullioned and transomed, in eared brick architraves.	II
Burlington Row; 53.89689°N 0.68210°W		1677–78	A group of six almshouses, in red brick with pantile roofs. There is a single storey, an E-shaped plan, and eight bays. The doorways and the windows, which are 20th-century casements, are under flat gauged brick arches.	II
Gate piers 53.89822°N 0.67815°W	—	Early 18th century	The gate piers flank the entrance to the garden at the rear of Londesborough Hall, now demolished. They are in rusticated white limestone, with raised and fielded panels to the principal sides, and a deep moulded cornice.	II*
Gates and gateway 53.89793°N 0.67921°W		Early 18th century	The gateway to the gardens at the rear of Londesborough Hall, now demolished, is in red brick with flagstone coping. It consists of a round-headed arch with an impost band and an archivolt, and flanking walls. The gates are in wrought iron.	II
Garden walls and gateway, Londesborough Park; 53.89145°N 0.67835°W	—	1730	The walls enclosing the garden are in brick with stone dressings. They incorporate a round-headed gateway with a rusticated surround, chamfered imposts and a keystone.	II
1750; 53.897828°N 0.679971°W		18th century or earlier	A row of three pebbledashed cottages, in chalk on the ground floor and red brick above, with a hipped pantile roof. There are two storeys, three bays and a rear wing. On the front is a trellised porch with a ramped lead roof. The windows are casements under segmental brick arches, and above are three swept roof dormers with casements.	II
Terrace wall, steps, and urns 53.89721°N 0.67790°W		18th century	The terrace wall forms the southern boundary of the gardens of Londesborough Hall, now demolished. It is in red brick with stone dressings, and at the east end are twelve giant round arches with an impost band, and three smaller arches. The wall has moulded coping ending in abutments with cornices, one with a ball finial. In the wall are 13 stone steps falnked by two pairs of oval urns on bases.	II
Rectory; 53.89750°N 0.68065°W		Late 18th century	The house is in red brick, with a floor band, a dentilled timber eaves cornice and a Westmorland slate roof with raised coped gables. There are two storeys and three bays. The central doorway has fluted pilasters, panelled reveals and a soffit, a frieze, and a deep moulded cornice on consoles. The windows are sashes, those on the ground floor tripartite under flat gauged brick arches.	II
