= Lars Petter Nordhaug =

Norwegian road bicycle racer

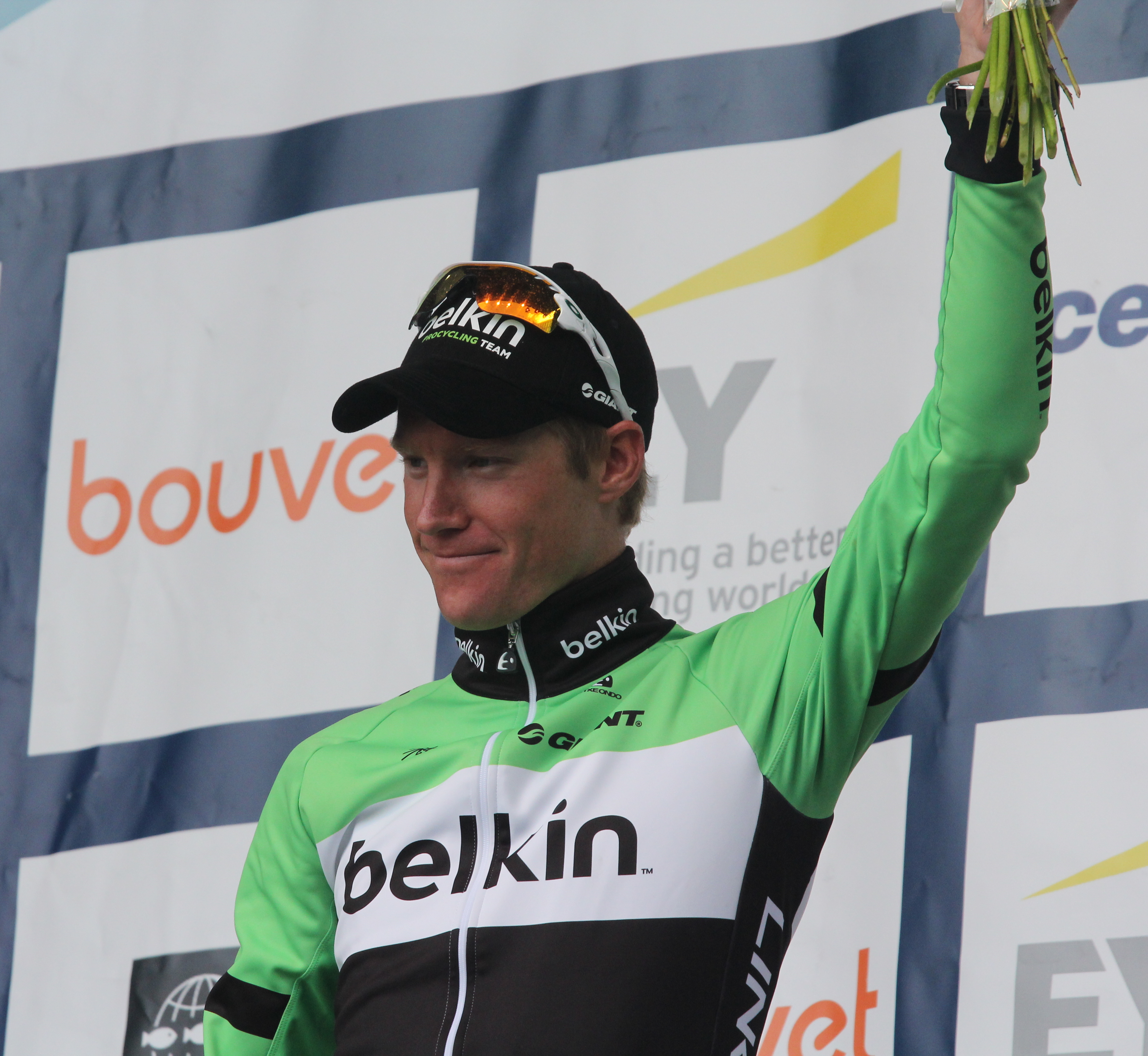
- Nordhaug at the 2013 Tour des Fjords

Personal information
- Full name: Lars Petter Nordhaug
- Nickname: LPN
- Born: 14 May 1984 (age 42) Tønsberg, Norway
- Height: 1.76 m (5 ft 9 1/2 in)
- Weight: 63 kg (139 lb; 9.9 st)

Cycling career
- Sport: Cycling
- Current team: Retired
- Disciplines: Road; Cyclo-cross; Mountain biking
- Role: Rider
- Rider type: Puncheur

Professional teams
- 2005–2009: Maxbo–Bianchi
- 2010–2012: Team Sky
- 2013–2014: Blanco Pro Cycling
- 2015–2016: Team Sky
- 2017: Aqua Blue Sport

Major wins
- Stage races Tour de Yorkshire (2015) Single-day races and Classics National Road Race Championships (2006) GP de Montréal (2012)

Lars Petter Nordhaug (born 14 May 1984) is a Norwegian former road bicycle racer, who competed professionally between 2005 and 2017 for the Joker–Bianchi, Belkin Pro Cycling, Team Sky and Aqua Blue Sport teams.

== Career ==
=== Early career ===
Nordhaug started his career as a mountain biker, but after finishing 5th in the 2004 Norwegian National Road Race Championships, his focus changed towards road bicycle racing. His breakthrough came two years later, in 2006, when he won the national road race championships. This year was his breakout year, also winning Birkebeinerrittet, a Norwegian long-distance mountain-bike cycling race.

In August 2009, Nordhaug scored a second overall finish on the Tour of Ireland while riding for UCI Continental team Joker–Bianchi. This race was a three-stage event classified as 2.1. His victory in the undulating last stage carried him to that placing, after he got the best of breakaway companion Russell Downing, who won the general classification.

=== Team Sky (2010–12) ===
After a week of rumours, it was announced on 10 September 2009 that Nordhaug would be joining Team Sky from the 2010 season, along with fellow Norwegians Edvald Boasson Hagen and Kurt Asle Arvesen. Nordhaug spent the 2010 and 2011 seasons working mainly as a domestique, riding the Ardennes classics and the 2011 Giro d'Italia. He signed a new contract with Sky at the end of 2011.

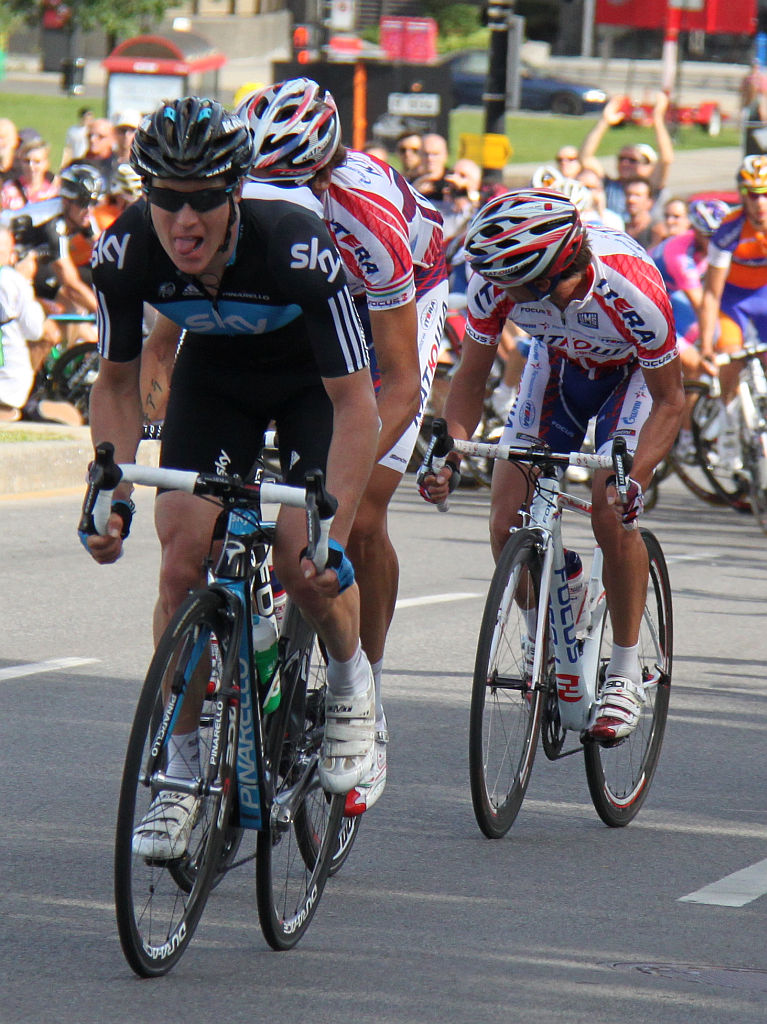
Nordhaug competing in the 2012 Grand Prix Cycliste de Montréal

Nordhaug took his first victory for Sky at the 2012 Trofeo Deià, the third race at the Vuelta a Mallorca. He shook off the last contenders on the last difficulty of the day, before descending solo and crossing the line in Deià, registering his first victory since 2009. He also rode a good Critérium International event in Corsica, finishing fourth overall behind a strong podium composed of Cadel Evans (BMC Racing Team), Pierrick Fédrigo (FDJ–BigMat) and his teammate Michael Rogers. Nordhaug led Sky at the Tour of the Basque Country, where he came sixth overall. His promising early season form saw him take a prominent role in the team's Ardennes classics squad. Nordhaug was well placed in the closing stages of the Amstel Gold Race but crashed out in the final 300 metres (980 ft) of the finishing climb, the Cauberg, after clashing wheels with Lampre–ISD's Damiano Cunego. Nordhaug was not selected for the Vuelta a España and instead rode the Danmark Rundt, where he won the third stage, to take the overall lead in the race. He took his biggest career victory to that point at the 2012 Grand Prix Cycliste de Montréal, winning a sprint from a group of four riders after his solo attack was caught in the closing stages of the race.

=== Belkin (2013–14) ===
In August 2012, Nordhaug announced that he would leave Team Sky at the end of the 2012 season, and would join Blanco Pro Cycling on a two-year contract from the 2013 season onwards.

=== Return to Sky (2015–16) ===
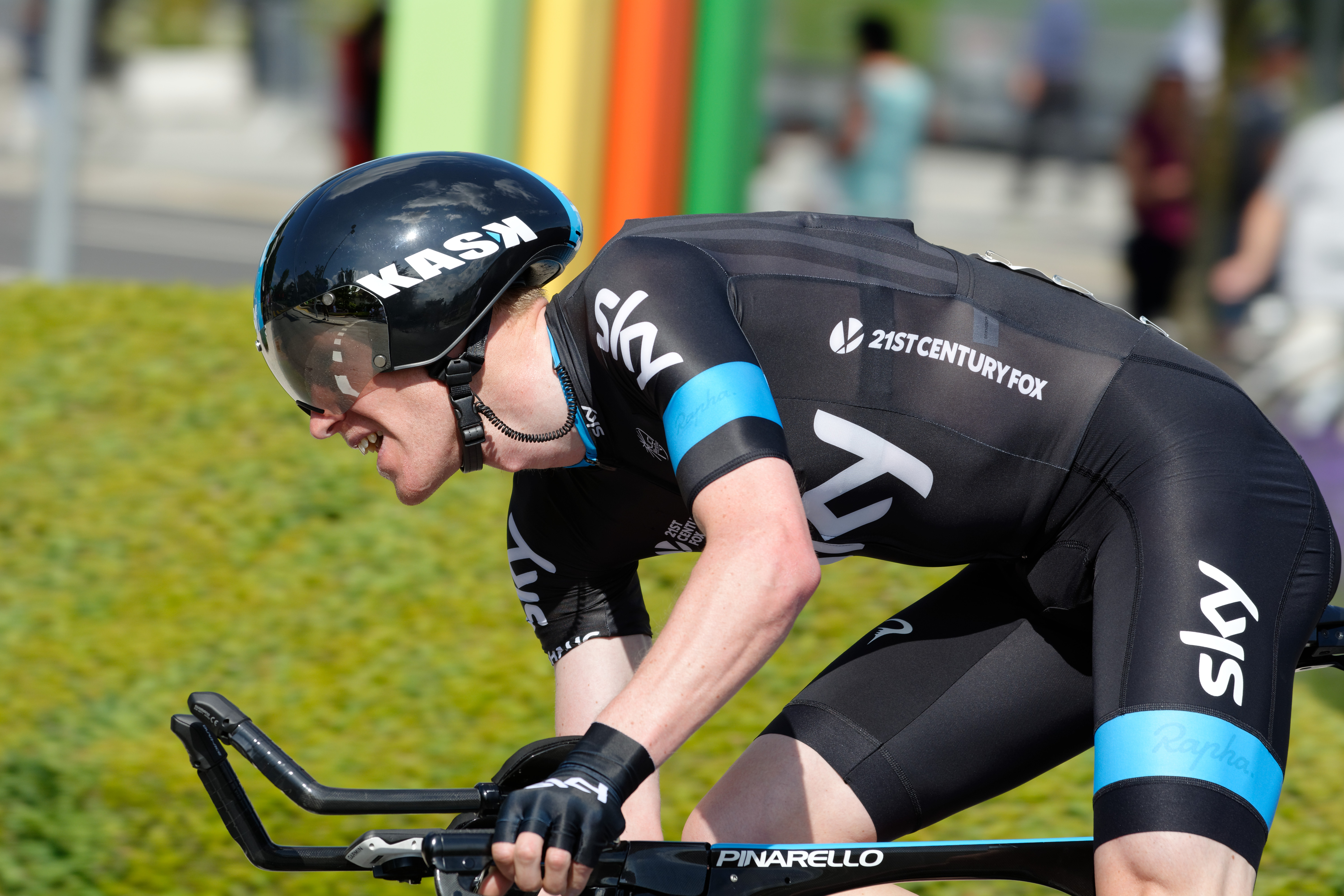
Nordhaug at the 2015 Tour de Suisse

At the 2014 UCI Road World Championships, Nordhaug confirmed that he would be leaving Belkin Pro Cycling. Team Sky later announced that he would be rejoining the team from 1 January 2015.

He made history at the 2015 Tour de Yorkshire, winning the inaugural stage of the new race from a breakaway of five riders. With that move, he took the leader's jersey and the points jersey, neither of which he would relinquish, to become the first winner of the race. This was also the first stage race won by Nordhaug outside his native Norway.

== Major results ==
2001
2nd Cross-country, UCI World Junior MTB Championships
2004
1st Cross-country, National MTB Championships
2005
1st Road race, National Under-23 Road Championships
5th Overall Ringerike GP
2006
1st Road race, National Road Championships
1st Birkebeinerrittet
2007
1st Gjøvik GP
4th Overall Ringerike GP
5th Overall Paris–Corrèze
2008
1st Cross-country, National MTB Championships
1st Overall Festningsrittet

1st Points classification
1st Stages 2 & 3

2nd Overall GP Borremans Viane
3rd Road race, National Road Championships
3rd Overall Kalas Cup Trophy
7th Overall Tour of Ireland
7th Sparkassen Giro Bochum
8th Overall Rhône-Alpes Isère Tour

1st Mountains classification

9th Overall Ringerike GP
2009
2nd Overall Tour of Ireland

1st Stage 3

4th Overall Tour de Normandie

1st Stage 5

5th Overall Ringerike GP
2010
1st Stage 1 (TTT) Tour of Qatar
9th Oslo Grand Prix
2011
1st Tønsberg Cyclo-cross
6th Coppa Sabatini
2012
1st Grand Prix Cycliste de Montréal
1st Trofeo Deià
National Road Championships

2nd Road race
3rd Time trial

3rd Overall Tour of Norway
4th Overall Critérium International
6th Overall Tour of the Basque Country
10th Overall Danmark Rundt

1st Stage 3

2013
1st National CX Championships
1st Mountains classification, Arctic Race of Norway
2nd Overall Tour des Fjords
8th Grand Prix Cycliste de Montréal
2014
3rd Overall Arctic Race of Norway

1st Stage 1

2015
1st Overall Tour de Yorkshire

1st Points classification
1st Stage 1

10th Overall Tour of Norway
2016
6th Overall Tour de Yorkshire
9th Strade Bianche
