= Wetwang =

Village and civil parish in England

Coordinates: 54.0194°N 0.5789°W

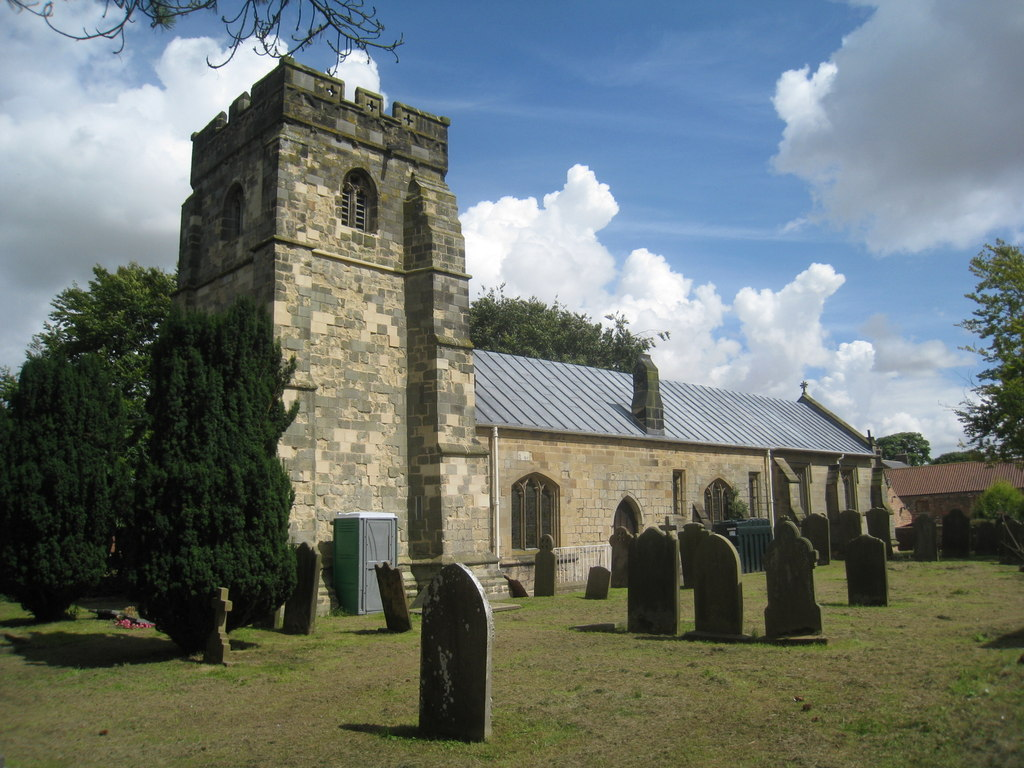
- St Nicholas Church

- Location within the East Riding of Yorkshire
- Population: 761 (2011 census)
- OS grid reference: SE932590
- Civil parish: Wetwang
- Unitary authority: East Riding of Yorkshire
- Ceremonial county: East Riding of Yorkshire
- Region: Yorkshire and the Humber
- Country: England
- Sovereign state: United Kingdom
- Post town: DRIFFIELD
- Postcode district: YO25
- Dialling code: 01377
- Police: Humberside
- Fire: Humberside
- Ambulance: Yorkshire
- UK Parliament: Bridlington and The Wolds

Wetwang is a Yorkshire Wolds village and civil parish in the East Riding of Yorkshire, England, 6 miles (10 kilometres) west of Driffield on the A166 road.

At the 2011 census, it had a population of 761, an increase on the 2001 census figure of 672.

== Name ==
There are two interpretations of the name. One is from the Old Norse vaett-vangr, or 'field for the trial of a legal action'. Another theory is that it was the "wet field" compared to the nearby dry field at Driffield.

The name is jokingly defined in The Meaning of Liff by Douglas Adams as meaning "a moist penis". In some varieties of English, wang or whang is a slang term for penis. The name Wetwang has frequently been noted on lists of unusual place names.

== History ==
The village is known for its Iron Age chariot burial cemetery at Wetwang Slack, and it has been speculated that the unlocated Romano-British town of Delgovicia may have been at what is now Wetwang.

Before the Norman Conquest (TRE) Ealdraed held Wetwang, and it was worth £4 per year in rent.

The village is mentioned twice in the Domesday Book of 1086 as Wetuuangha. The lesser mention simply records its existence: "In Wetwang the archbishop 13 1/2 carucates". The mention is under "Warter Hundred" on original folio 381V: East Riding. Earlier in the Domesday Book, there is a fuller description (Folio 302V: Yorkshire) within the listing of the land of the Archbishop of York:

In Wetwang there are 13 1/2 carucates to the geld, and there could be 7 ploughs. Archbishop Ealdraed held this as 1 manor. Now Archbishop Thomas has it and it is waste. TRE worth £4. This manor is 2 leagues long and 1 1/2 broad

— Folio 302V: Yorkshire) within the listing of the land of the Archbishop of York

A carucate is the area of land a man with 8 oxen can plough in a season, sometimes cited as around 120 acres (49 ha). In Wetwang there were 13 1/2 of them available for the tax take ("geld"). A "plough" was a carucate which was being ploughed, rather than grazed or fallow. A league is around 3 miles (4.8 km). After the conquest, Wetwang was waste land held by Archbishop Thomas.

St Nicholas's Church is of Norman origin and was restored between 1845 and 1902. In 1966, the church was designated a Grade II* listed building. It is on the Sykes Churches Trail devised by the East Yorkshire Churches Group. The church has a ring of three bells (tenor 7 long cwt 0 qr 12 lb; 796 lb or 361 kg in A), the oldest of which (the tenor) dates from c. 1450.

Wetwang was once known for its black swans, after which the village pub, the Black Swan, is named.

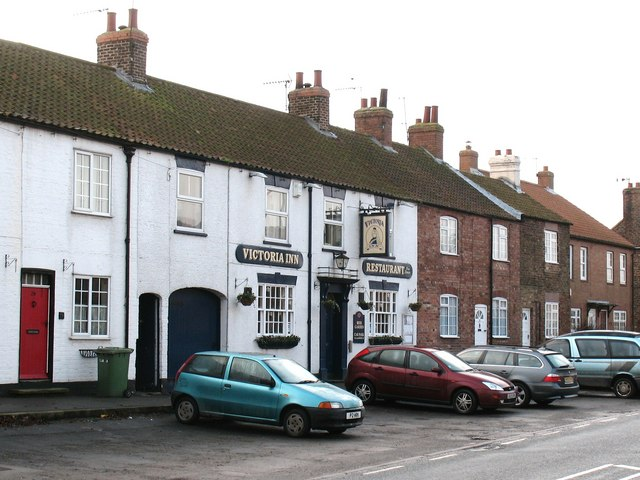
The Victoria Inn

== Public transport ==
Until 1950, the village was served by Wetwang railway station, on the Malton to Driffield Line, but this line has closed. The village is now served by an infrequent East Yorkshire Motor Services bus.

== Honorary mayor ==
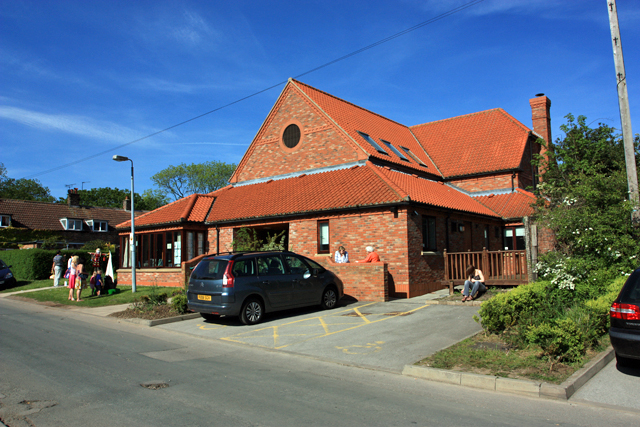
Wetwang Community Hall

Richard Whiteley of the Channel 4 quiz show Countdown held the honorary title Mayor of Wetwang from 1998 until his death in 2005. On 25 June 2006, local weather forecaster Paul Hudson from BBC Look North was invested as Whiteley's successor.

Year	Mayor
1998–2005	Richard Whiteley
2006–present	Paul Hudson

== In literature ==
In the works of J. R. R. Tolkien, the name Wetwang is used as the common speech rendering of a swampy area by the great river Anduin in Middle-earth. Tolkien himself commanded an outpost in Yorkshire in 1917–1918, in the vicinity of Wetwang.

== See also ==
- Listed buildings in Wetwang
