= 2019 Étoile de Bessèges =

2019 UCI Europe Tour

Race details
- Dates: 7–10 February 2019
- Stages: 4
- Distance: 471.6 km (293.0 mi)
- Winning time: 10h 29' 35"

Results
Jersey awarded to the overall winner	Winner	Christophe Laporte (FRA)	(Cofidis)
	Second	Tobias Ludvigsson (SWE)	(Groupama–FDJ)
	Third	Jimmy Janssens (BEL)	(Corendon–Circus)
Jersey awarded to the points classification winner	Points	Christophe Laporte (FRA)	(Cofidis)
Jersey awarded to the mountains classification winner	Mountains	Edward Planckaert (BEL)	(Sport Vlaanderen–Baloise)
Jersey awarded to the youth classification winner	Youth	Valentin Madouas (FRA)	(Groupama–FDJ)
	Team	Groupama–FDJ	

The 2019 Étoile de Bessèges (transl. Star of Bessèges) was a road cycling stage race that took place between 7 and 10 February 2019. The race was rated as a 2.1 event as part of the 2019 UCI Europe Tour, and was the 49th edition of the Étoile de Bessèges cycling race.

The race was won by French rider Christophe Laporte of the Cofidis team.

== Teams ==
Twenty-two teams of up to seven riders started the race:

UCI WorldTeams

- AG2R La Mondiale
- EF Education First
- Groupama–FDJ
- Lotto–Soudal
- Trek–Segafredo

UCI Professional Continental Teams

- Arkéa–Samsic
- Cofidis
- Corendon–Circus
- Delko–Marseille Provence
- Euskadi–Murias
- Gazprom–RusVelo
- Israel Cycling Academy
- Sport Vlaanderen–Baloise
- Direct Énergie
- Vital Concept–B&B Hotels
- Wallonie Bruxelles
- Wanty–Gobert

UCI Continental Teams

- Amore & Vita–Prodir
- Natura4Ever–Roubaix–Lille Métropole
- Sovac Algérie
- St. Michel–Auber93
- Team Colpack

== Route ==
Stage characteristics and winners
Stage	Date	Course	Distance	Type	Stage winner
1	7 February	Bellegarde to Beaucaire	145 km (90.1 mi)	Flat stage	Bryan Coquard (FRA)
2	8 February	Saint-Geniès-de-Malgoirès to La Calmette	157.9 km (98.1 mi)	Flat stage	Christophe Laporte (FRA)
3	9 February	Bessèges to Bessèges	158 km (98.2 mi)	Hilly stage	Marc Sarreau (FRA)
4	10 February	Alès to Alès	10.7 km (6.6 mi)	Individual time trial	Christophe Laporte (FRA)
Total		471.6 km (293.0 mi)			

== Stages ==
=== Stage 1 ===
7 February 2019 – Bellegarde to Beaucaire, 145 km (90.1 mi)

Stage 1 result
Rank	Rider	Team	Time
1	Bryan Coquard (FRA)	Vital Concept–B&B Hotels	3h 16' 42"
2	Sacha Modolo (ITA)	EF Education First	+ 0"
3	Pierre Barbier (FRA)	Natura4Ever–Roubaix–Lille Métropole	+ 0"
4	Marc Sarreau (FRA)	Groupama–FDJ	+ 0"
5	Christophe Laporte (FRA)	Cofidis	+ 0"
6	Tom van Asbroeck (BEL)	Israel Cycling Academy	+ 0"
7	Kenny Dehaes (BEL)	Wallonie Bruxelles	+ 0"
8	Roy Jans (BEL)	Corendon–Circus	+ 0"
9	Clément Venturini (FRA)	AG2R La Mondiale	+ 0"
10	Amaury Capiot (BEL)	Sport Vlaanderen–Baloise	+ 0"

General classification after Stage 1
Rank	Rider	Team	Time
1	Bryan Coquard (FRA)	Vital Concept–B&B Hotels	3h 16' 42"
2	Sacha Modolo (ITA)	EF Education First	+ 4"
3	Pierre Barbier (FRA)	Natura4Ever–Roubaix–Lille Métropole	+ 6"
4	Valentin Madouas (FRA)	Groupama–FDJ	+ 7"
5	Maxime Daniel (FRA)	Arkéa–Samsic	+ 8"
6	Julien Trarieux (FRA)	Delko–Marseille Provence	+ 9"
7	Marc Sarreau (FRA)	Groupama–FDJ	+ 10"
8	Christophe Laporte (FRA)	Cofidis	+ 10"
9	Tom van Asbroeck (BEL)	Israel Cycling Academy	+ 10"
10	Kenny Dehaes (BEL)	Wallonie Bruxelles	+ 10"

=== Stage 2 ===
8 February 2019 – Saint-Geniès-de-Malgoirès to La Calmette, 157.9 km (98.1 mi)

Stage 2 result
Rank	Rider	Team	Time
1	Christophe Laporte (FRA)	Cofidis	3h 30' 59"
2	Clément Venturini (FRA)	AG2R La Mondiale	+ 0"
3	Enzo Wouters (BEL)	Lotto–Soudal	+ 0"
4	Niccolò Bonifazio (ITA)	Direct Énergie	+ 0"
5	Roy Jans (BEL)	Corendon–Circus	+ 0"
6	Pierre Barbier (FRA)	Natura4Ever–Roubaix–Lille Métropole	+ 0"
7	Kenny Dehaes (BEL)	Wallonie Bruxelles	+ 0"
8	Bram Welten (NED)	Arkéa–Samsic	+ 0"
9	August Jensen (NOR)	Israel Cycling Academy	+ 0"
10	Marc Sarreau (FRA)	Groupama–FDJ	+ 0"

General classification after Stage 2
Rank	Rider	Team	Time
1	Christophe Laporte (FRA)	Cofidis	6h 47' 31"
2	Bryan Coquard (FRA)	Vital Concept–B&B Hotels	+ 0"
3	Jérôme Cousin (FRA)	Direct Énergie	+ 3"
4	Clément Venturini (FRA)	AG2R La Mondiale	+ 4"
5	Sacha Modolo (ITA)	EF Education First	+ 4"
6	Pierre Barbier (FRA)	Natura4Ever–Roubaix–Lille Métropole	+ 6"
7	Enzo Wouters (BEL)	Lotto–Soudal	+ 6"
8	Amaury Capiot (BEL)	Sport Vlaanderen–Baloise	+ 6"
9	Valentin Madouas (FRA)	Groupama–FDJ	+ 7"
10	Pierre-Luc Périchon (FRA)	Cofidis	+ 7"

=== Stage 3 ===
9 February 2019 – Bessèges to Bessèges, 158 km (98.2 mi)

Stage 3 result
Rank	Rider	Team	Time
1	Marc Sarreau (FRA)	Groupama–FDJ	3h 26' 31"
2	Christophe Laporte (FRA)	Cofidis	+ 0"
3	Mikel Aristi (ESP)	Euskadi–Murias	+ 0"
4	Niccolò Bonifazio (ITA)	Direct Énergie	+ 0"
5	Bryan Coquard (FRA)	Vital Concept–B&B Hotels	+ 0"
6	Milan Menten (BEL)	Sport Vlaanderen–Baloise	+ 0"
7	Roy Jans (BEL)	Corendon–Circus	+ 0"
8	Clément Venturini (FRA)	AG2R La Mondiale	+ 0"
9	Baptiste Planckaert (BEL)	Wallonie Bruxelles	+ 0"
10	August Jensen (NOR)	Israel Cycling Academy	+ 0"

General classification after Stage 3
Rank	Rider	Team	Time
1	Christophe Laporte (FRA)	Cofidis	10h 13' 56"
2	Bryan Coquard (FRA)	Vital Concept–B&B Hotels	+ 5"
3	Marc Sarreau (FRA)	Groupama–FDJ	+ 6"
4	Jérôme Cousin (FRA)	Direct Énergie	+ 9"
5	Clément Venturini (FRA)	AG2R La Mondiale	+ 10"
6	Mikel Aristi (ESP)	Euskadi–Murias	+ 12"
7	Amaury Capiot (BEL)	Sport Vlaanderen–Baloise	+ 12"
8	Valentin Madouas (FRA)	Groupama–FDJ	+ 13"
9	Anthony Turgis (FRA)	Direct Énergie	+ 13"
10	Yoann Paillot (FRA)	St. Michel–Auber93	+ 13"

=== Stage 4 ===
10 February 2019 – Alès to Alès, 10.7 km (6.6 mi), individual time trial (ITT)

Stage 4 result
Rank	Rider	Team	Time
1	Christophe Laporte (FRA)	Cofidis	15' 39"
2	Tobias Ludvigsson (SWE)	Groupama–FDJ	+ 0"
3	Jimmy Janssens (BEL)	Corendon–Circus	+ 13"
4	Bauke Mollema (NED)	Trek–Segafredo	+ 13"
5	Sep Vanmarcke (BEL)	EF Education First	+ 18"
6	Sebastian Langeveld (NED)	EF Education First	+ 20"
7	Yoann Paillot (FRA)	St. Michel–Auber93	+ 23"
8	Fabio Felline (ITA)	Trek–Segafredo	+ 30"
9	Valentin Madouas (FRA)	Groupama–FDJ	+ 30"
10	Eliot Lietaer (BEL)	Sport Vlaanderen–Baloise	+ 32"

General classification after Stage 4
Rank	Rider	Team	Time
1	Christophe Laporte (FRA)	Cofidis	10h 29' 35"
2	Tobias Ludvigsson (SWE)	Groupama–FDJ	+ 16"
3	Jimmy Janssens (BEL)	Corendon–Circus	+ 29"
4	Bauke Mollema (NED)	Trek–Segafredo	+ 29"
5	Sep Vanmarcke (BEL)	EF Education First	+ 34"
6	Yoann Paillot (FRA)	St. Michel–Auber93	+ 36"
7	Sebastian Langeveld (NED)	EF Education First	+ 36"
8	Valentin Madouas (FRA)	Groupama–FDJ	+ 43"
9	Fabio Felline (ITA)	Trek–Segafredo	+ 46"
10	Eliot Lietaer (BEL)	Sport Vlaanderen–Baloise	+ 48"

== Classifications ==
Stage	Winner	General classification	Points classification	Mountains classification	Youth classification	Team classification
1	Bryan Coquard	Bryan Coquard	Bryan Coquard	Edward Planckaert	Pierre Barbier	Sport Vlaanderen–Baloise
2	Christophe Laporte	Christophe Laporte	Christophe Laporte	Amaury Capiot	Pierre Barbier	Sport Vlaanderen–Baloise
3	Marc Sarreau	Christophe Laporte	Christophe Laporte	Edward Planckaert	Valentin Madouas	Sport Vlaanderen–Baloise
4	Christophe Laporte	Christophe Laporte	Christophe Laporte	Edward Planckaert	Valentin Madouas	Groupama–FDJ
Final		Christophe Laporte	Christophe Laporte	Edward Planckaert	Valentin Madouas	Groupama–FDJ

== Final classification standings ==
=== General classification ===
Final general classification (1–10)
Rank	Rider	Team	Time
1	Christophe Laporte (FRA)	Cofidis	10h 29' 35"
2	Tobias Ludvigsson (SWE)	Groupama–FDJ	+ 16"
3	Jimmy Janssens (BEL)	Corendon–Circus	+ 29"
4	Bauke Mollema (NED)	Trek–Segafredo	+ 29"
5	Sep Vanmarcke (BEL)	EF Education First	+ 34"
6	Yoann Paillot (FRA)	St. Michel–Auber93	+ 36"
7	Sebastian Langeveld (NED)	EF Education First	+ 36"
8	Valentin Madouas (FRA)	Groupama–FDJ	+ 43"
9	Fabio Felline (ITA)	Trek–Segafredo	+ 46"
10	Eliot Lietaer (BEL)	Sport Vlaanderen–Baloise	+ 48"

=== Points classification ===
Final points classification (1–10)
Rank	Rider	Team	Points
1	Christophe Laporte (FRA)	Cofidis	82
2	Marc Sarreau (FRA)	Groupama–FDJ	45
3	Bryan Coquard (FRA)	Vital Concept–B&B Hotels	39
4	Clément Venturini (FRA)	AG2R La Mondiale	35
5	Niccolò Bonifazio (ITA)	Direct Énergie	33
6	Roy Jans (BEL)	Corendon–Circus	29
7	Pierre Barbier (FRA)	Natura4Ever–Roubaix–Lille Métropole	26
8	Sacha Modolo (ITA)	EF Education First	21
9	Tobias Ludvigsson (SWE)	Groupama–FDJ	20
10	Enzo Wouters (BEL)	Lotto–Soudal	18

=== Mountains classification ===
Final mountains classification (1–10)
Rank	Rider	Team	Points
1	Edward Planckaert (BEL)	Sport Vlaanderen–Baloise	22
2	Benjamin Declercq (BEL)	Sport Vlaanderen–Baloise	14
3	Amaury Capiot (BEL)	Sport Vlaanderen–Baloise	12
4	Pierre-Luc Périchon (FRA)	Cofidis	8
5	Axel Domont (FRA)	AG2R La Mondiale	6
6	Romain Seigle (FRA)	Groupama–FDJ	4
7	Quentin Pacher (FRA)	Vital Concept–B&B Hotels	4
8	Fabio Felline (ITA)	Trek–Segafredo	2
9	Jérôme Cousin (FRA)	Direct Énergie	2
10	Romain Combaud (FRA)	Delko–Marseille Provence	2

=== Young rider classification ===
Final young rider classification (1–10)
Rank	Rider	Team	Time
1	Valentin Madouas (FRA)	Groupama–FDJ	10h 30' 18"
2	Thibault Guernalec (FRA)	Arkéa–Samsic	+ 8"
3	Tom Wirtgen (LUX)	Wallonie Bruxelles	+ 32"
4	Sean Bennett (USA)	EF Education First	+ 34"
5	Julien Mortier (BEL)	Wallonie Bruxelles	+ 40"
6	Paolo Baccio (ITA)	Team Colpack	+ 52"
7	Jordi Warlop (BEL)	Sport Vlaanderen–Baloise	+ 56"
8	Milan Menten (BEL)	Sport Vlaanderen–Baloise	+ 1' 07"
9	Alessandro Covi (ITA)	Team Colpack	+ 1' 19"
10	Pierre Idjouadiene (FRA)	AG2R La Mondiale	+ 2' 57"

=== Teams classification ===
Final teams classification (1–10)
Rank	Team	Time
1	Groupama–FDJ	31h 30' 38"
2	Trek–Segafredo	+ 20"
3	EF Education First	+ 30"
4	Corendon–Circus	+ 56"
5	Direct Énergie	+ 57"
6	Vital Concept–B&B Hotels	+ 1' 13"
7	AG2R La Mondiale	+ 1' 18"
8	Wallonie Bruxelles	+ 1' 21"
9	Wanty–Gobert	+ 1' 24"
10	St. Michel–Auber93	+ 1' 36"
