= 2017 Tour des Fjords =

2017 UCI Europe Tour

Race details
- Dates: 24–28 May 2017
- Stages: 5
- Distance: 873.2 km (542.6 mi)
- Winning time: 21h 36' 25"

Results
Jersey awarded to the overall winner	Winner	Edvald Boasson Hagen (NOR)	(Team Dimension Data)
	Second	Dries Van Gestel (BEL)	(Sport Vlaanderen–Baloise)
	Third	Timo Roosen (NED)	(LottoNL–Jumbo)
Jersey awarded to the points classification winner	Points	Edvald Boasson Hagen (NOR)	(Team Dimension Data)
Jersey awarded to the mountains classification winner	Mountains	Wilmar Paredes (COL)	(Team Manzana Postobón)
Jersey awarded to the young rider classification winner	Young rider	Dries Van Gestel (BEL)	(Sport Vlaanderen–Baloise)
	Team	Roompot–Nederlandse Loterij	

2017 Tour des Fjords was the fifth edition of the Tour des Fjords cycle stage race. The race was won by Norwegian Team Dimension Data racer Edvald Boasson Hagen.

== Teams ==
Twenty teams were invited to start the race. These included three UCI WorldTeams, eight UCI Professional Continental teams and nine UCI Continental teams.

UCI WorldTeams

- Team Dimension Data
- LottoNL–Jumbo
- Team Sunweb

UCI Professional Continental teams

- Caja Rural–Seguros RGA
- CCC–Sprandi–Polkowice
- Israel Cycling Academy
- Team Manzana Postobón
- Roompot–Nederlandse Loterij
- Sport Vlaanderen–Baloise
- Vérandas Willems–Crelan
- Wanty–Groupe Gobert

UCI Continental teams

- Team ColoQuick–Cult
- Team Coop
- Team FixIT.no
- Joker Icopal
- Riwal Platform
- Team Sparebanken Sør
- Team Tre Berg–PostNord
- Uno-X Hydrogen Development Team
- Team VéloCONCEPT

== Schedule ==
Stage schedule
Stage	Date	Route	Distance	Type	Winner
1	24 May	Balestrand to Førde	189.8 km (117.9 mi)	Medium-mountain stage	Dries Van Gestel (BEL)
2	25 May	Gulen to Norheimsund	183.1 km (113.8 mi)	Medium-mountain stage	Timo Roosen (NED)
3	26 May	Odda to Karmøy	176.9 km (109.9 mi)	Flat stage	Edvald Boasson Hagen (NOR)
4	27 May	Stavanger to Sandnes	160.4 km (99.7 mi)	Flat stage	Edvald Boasson Hagen (NOR)
5	28 May	Hinna to Stavanger	163 km (101.3 mi)	Medium-mountain stage	Edvald Boasson Hagen (NOR)

== Stages ==
=== Stage 1 ===
24 May 2017 – Balestrand to Førde, 189.8 km (117.9 mi)

Stage 1 result
Rank	Rider	Team	Time
1	Dries Van Gestel (BEL)	Sport Vlaanderen–Baloise	4h 35' 16"
2	Daniel Turek (CZE)	Israel Cycling Academy	+ 0"
3	Héctor Sáez (ESP)	Caja Rural–Seguros RGA	+ 0"
4	Torkil Veyhe (DEN)	Team ColoQuick–Cult	+ 0"
5	Youcef Reguigui (ALG)	Team Dimension Data	+ 27"
6	August Jensen (NOR)	Team Coop	+ 27"
7	Amund Grøndahl Jansen (NOR)	LottoNL–Jumbo	+ 27"
8	André Looij (NED)	Roompot–Nederlandse Loterij	+ 27"
9	Jonas Koch (GER)	CCC–Sprandi–Polkowice	+ 27"
10	Andrea Pasqualon (ITA)	Wanty–Groupe Gobert	+ 27"

General classification after Stage 1
Rank	Rider	Team	Time
1	Daniel Turek (CZE)	Israel Cycling Academy	4h 35' 02"
2	Dries Van Gestel (BEL)	Sport Vlaanderen–Baloise	+ 2"
3	Héctor Sáez (ESP)	Caja Rural–Seguros RGA	+ 10"
4	Torkil Veyhe (DEN)	Team ColoQuick–Cult	+ 12"
5	Ole Forfang (NOR)	Joker Icopal	+ 35"
6	Youcef Reguigui (ALG)	Team Dimension Data	+ 41"
7	August Jensen (NOR)	Team Coop	+ 41"
8	Amund Grøndahl Jansen (NOR)	LottoNL–Jumbo	+ 41"
9	André Looij (NED)	Roompot–Nederlandse Loterij	+ 41"
10	Jonas Koch (GER)	CCC–Sprandi–Polkowice	+ 41"

=== Stage 2 ===
25 May 2017 – Gulen to Norheimsund, 183.1 km (113.8 mi)

Stage 2 result
Rank	Rider	Team	Time
1	Timo Roosen (NED)	LottoNL–Jumbo	4h 45' 06"
2	Edvald Boasson Hagen (NOR)	Team Dimension Data	+ 3"
3	August Jensen (NOR)	Team Coop	+ 3"
4	Kasper Asgreen (DEN)	Team VéloCONCEPT	+ 3"
5	Bjørn Tore Hoem (NOR)	Joker Icopal	+ 3"
6	Nick van der Lijke (NED)	Roompot–Nederlandse Loterij	+ 3"
7	Leszek Pluciński (POL)	CCC–Sprandi–Polkowice	+ 3"
8	Jeroen Meijers (NED)	Roompot–Nederlandse Loterij	+ 3"
9	Lennard Kämna (GER)	Team Sunweb	+ 3"
10	Dries Van Gestel (BEL)	Sport Vlaanderen–Baloise	+ 3"

General classification after Stage 2
Rank	Rider	Team	Time
1	Dries Van Gestel (BEL)	Sport Vlaanderen–Baloise	9h 20' 12"
2	Timo Roosen (NED)	LottoNL–Jumbo	+ 24"
3	Edvald Boasson Hagen (NOR)	Team Dimension Data	+ 31"
4	August Jensen (NOR)	Team Coop	+ 36"
5	Kasper Asgreen (DEN)	Team VéloCONCEPT	+ 40"
6	Andreas Vangstad (NOR)	Team Sparebanken Sør	+ 40"
7	Lennard Kämna (GER)	Team Sunweb	+ 40"
8	Eliot Lietaer (BEL)	Sport Vlaanderen–Baloise	+ 40"
9	Bjørn Tore Hoem (NOR)	Joker Icopal	+ 40"
10	Nick van der Lijke (NED)	Roompot–Nederlandse Loterij	+ 40"

=== Stage 3 ===
26 May 2017 – Odda to Karmøy, 176.9 km (109.9 mi)

Stage 3 result
Rank	Rider	Team	Time
1	Edvald Boasson Hagen (NOR)	Team Dimension Data	4h 25' 28"
2	Lars Boom (NED)	LottoNL–Jumbo	+ 0"
3	August Jensen (NOR)	Team Coop	+ 0"
4	Jonas Koch (GER)	CCC–Sprandi–Polkowice	+ 0"
5	André Looij (NED)	Roompot–Nederlandse Loterij	+ 0"
6	Andrea Pasqualon (ITA)	Wanty–Groupe Gobert	+ 0"
7	Michael Carbel (DEN)	Team VéloCONCEPT	+ 0"
8	Juan Sebastián Molano (COL)	Team Manzana Postobón	+ 0"
9	Timo Roosen (NED)	LottoNL–Jumbo	+ 0"
10	Youcef Reguigui (ALG)	Team Dimension Data	+ 0"

General classification after Stage 3
Rank	Rider	Team	Time
1	Dries Van Gestel (BEL)	Sport Vlaanderen–Baloise	13h 45' 40"
2	Edvald Boasson Hagen (NOR)	Team Dimension Data	+ 21"
3	Timo Roosen (NED)	LottoNL–Jumbo	+ 24"
4	August Jensen (NOR)	Team Coop	+ 32"
5	Lars Boom (NED)	LottoNL–Jumbo	+ 38"
6	Kasper Asgreen (DEN)	Team VéloCONCEPT	+ 40"
7	Lennard Kämna (GER)	Team Sunweb	+ 40"
8	Bjørn Tore Hoem (NOR)	Joker Icopal	+ 40"
9	Eliot Lietaer (BEL)	Sport Vlaanderen–Baloise	+ 40"
10	Nick van der Lijke (NED)	Roompot–Nederlandse Loterij	+ 43"

=== Stage 4 ===
27 May 2017 – Stavanger to Sandnes, 160.4 km (99.7 mi)

Stage 4 result
Rank	Rider	Team	Time
1	Edvald Boasson Hagen (NOR)	Team Dimension Data	4h 03' 58"
2	Torkil Veyhe (DEN)	Team ColoQuick–Cult	+ 1"
3	Andrea Pasqualon (ITA)	Wanty–Groupe Gobert	+ 3"
4	Timo Roosen (NED)	LottoNL–Jumbo	+ 3"
5	Serge Pauwels (BEL)	Team Dimension Data	+ 3"
6	Nick van der Lijke (NED)	Roompot–Nederlandse Loterij	+ 3"
7	August Jensen (NOR)	Team Coop	+ 3"
8	Jonathan Lastra (ESP)	Caja Rural–Seguros RGA	+ 3"
9	Trond Trondsen (NOR)	Team Sparebanken Sør	+ 3"
10	Lennard Kämna (GER)	Team Sunweb	+ 3"

General classification after Stage 4
Rank	Rider	Team	Time
1	Dries Van Gestel (BEL)	Sport Vlaanderen–Baloise	17h 49' 41"
2	Edvald Boasson Hagen (NOR)	Team Dimension Data	+ 5"
3	Timo Roosen (NED)	LottoNL–Jumbo	+ 24"
4	August Jensen (NOR)	Team Coop	+ 32"
5	Lars Boom (NED)	LottoNL–Jumbo	+ 38"
6	Lennard Kämna (GER)	Team Sunweb	+ 38"
7	Eliot Lietaer (BEL)	Sport Vlaanderen–Baloise	+ 40"
8	Nick van der Lijke (NED)	Roompot–Nederlandse Loterij	+ 43"
9	Andreas Vangstad (NOR)	Team Sparebanken Sør	+ 44"
10	Carl Fredrik Hagen (NOR)	Joker Icopal	+ 44"

=== Stage 5 ===
28 May 2017 – Hinna to Stavanger, 163 km (101.3 mi)

Stage 5 result
Rank	Rider	Team	Time
1	Edvald Boasson Hagen (NOR)	Team Dimension Data	3h 46' 55"
2	Timo Roosen (NED)	LottoNL–Jumbo	+ 0"
3	Jeroen Meijers (NED)	Roompot–Nederlandse Loterij	+ 0"
4	August Jensen (NOR)	Team Coop	+ 0"
5	Nick van der Lijke (NED)	Roompot–Nederlandse Loterij	+ 0"
6	Dries Van Gestel (BEL)	Sport Vlaanderen–Baloise	+ 0"
7	Eliot Lietaer (BEL)	Sport Vlaanderen–Baloise	+ 0"
8	Lennard Kämna (GER)	Team Sunweb	+ 0"
9	Patrick Clausen (DEN)	Riwal Platform	+ 0"
10	Sjoerd van Ginneken (NED)	Roompot–Nederlandse Loterij	+ 0"

Final general classification
Rank	Rider	Team	Time
1	Edvald Boasson Hagen (NOR)	Team Dimension Data	21h 36' 25"
2	Dries Van Gestel (BEL)	Sport Vlaanderen–Baloise	+ 9"
3	Timo Roosen (NED)	LottoNL–Jumbo	+ 29"
4	August Jensen (NOR)	Team Coop	+ 43"
5	Lennard Kämna (GER)	Team Sunweb	+ 47"
6	Eliot Lietaer (BEL)	Sport Vlaanderen–Baloise	+ 50"
7	Kasper Asgreen (DEN)	Team VéloCONCEPT	+ 51"
8	Jeroen Meijers (NED)	Roompot–Nederlandse Loterij	+ 51"
9	Nick van der Lijke (NED)	Roompot–Nederlandse Loterij	+ 54"
10	Andreas Vangstad (NOR)	Team Sparebanken Sør	+ 55"

== Classification leadership table ==
In the 2017 Tour des Fjords, four different jerseys were awarded. The general classification was calculated by adding each cyclist's finishing times on each stage, and allowing time bonuses for the first three finishers at intermediate sprints (three seconds to first, two seconds to second and one second to third) and at the finish of mass-start stages; these were awarded to the first three finishers on all stages: the stage winner won a ten-second bonus, with six and four seconds for the second and third riders respectively. The leader of the classification received a yellow jersey; it was considered the most important of the 2017 Tour des Fjords, and the winner of the classification was considered the winner of the race.

Points for the mountains classification
Position	1	2	3	4	5	6	7	8	9	10
Points for Category 1	10	9	8	7	6	5	4	3	2	1
Points for Category 2	6	5	4	3	2	1	0			
Points for Category 3	4	3	2	1	0					

There was also a mountains classification, the leadership of which was marked by a polka-dot jersey. In the mountains classification, points towards the classification were won by reaching the top of a climb before other cyclists. Each climb was categorised as either first, second, or third-category, with more points available for the higher-categorised climbs.

Points for the points classification
Position	1	2	3	4	5	6	7	8	9	10
Stage finishes	20	16	14	12	10	8	6	4	2	1
Intermediate sprints	6	4	2	0						

Additionally, there was a points classification, which awarded a blue jersey. In the points classification, cyclists received points for finishing in the top 10 in a stage. For winning a stage, a rider earned 20 points, with 16 for second, 14 for third and so on, down to 1 point for 10th place. Points towards the classification could also be accrued – awarded on a 6–4–2 scale – at intermediate sprint points during each stage; these intermediate sprints also offered bonus seconds towards the general classification as noted above.

The fourth and final jersey represented the classification for young riders, marked by a white jersey. This was decided the same way as the general classification, but only riders born after 1 January 1995 were eligible to be ranked in the classification. There was also a classification for teams, in which the times of the best three cyclists per team on each stage were added together; the leading team at the end of the race was the team with the lowest total time.

Classification leadership by stage
Stage	Winner	General classification	Points classification	Mountains classification	Young rider classification	Team classification
1	Dries Van Gestel	Daniel Turek	Daniel Turek	Markus Hoelgaard	Daniel Turek	Sport Vlaanderen–Baloise
2	Timo Roosen	Dries Van Gestel	Daniel Turek	Wilmar Paredes	Dries Van Gestel	Sport Vlaanderen–Baloise
3	Edvald Boasson Hagen	Dries Van Gestel	Edvald Boasson Hagen	Wilmar Paredes	Dries Van Gestel	Sport Vlaanderen–Baloise
4	Edvald Boasson Hagen	Dries Van Gestel	Edvald Boasson Hagen	Wilmar Paredes	Dries Van Gestel	Roompot–Nederlandse Loterij
5	Edvald Boasson Hagen	Edvald Boasson Hagen	Edvald Boasson Hagen	Wilmar Paredes	Dries Van Gestel	Roompot–Nederlandse Loterij
Final		Edvald Boasson Hagen	Edvald Boasson Hagen	Wilmar Paredes	Dries Van Gestel	Roompot–Nederlandse Loterij

== Final standings ==
Legend
Yellow jersey	Denotes the leader of the General classification
Blue jersey	Denotes the leader of the Points classification
Polka-dot jersey	Denotes the leader of the Mountains classification
White jersey	Denotes the leader of the Young rider classification

=== General classification ===
Result
Rank	Rider	Team	Time
1	Edvald Boasson Hagen (NOR)	Team Dimension Data	21h 36' 25"
2	Dries Van Gestel (BEL)	Sport Vlaanderen–Baloise	+ 9"
3	Timo Roosen (NED)	LottoNL–Jumbo	+ 29"
4	August Jensen (NOR)	Team Coop	+ 43"
5	Lennard Kämna (GER)	Team Sunweb	+ 47"
6	Eliot Lietaer (BEL)	Sport Vlaanderen–Baloise	+ 50"
7	Kasper Asgreen (DEN)	Team VéloCONCEPT	+ 51"
8	Jeroen Meijers (NED)	Roompot–Nederlandse Loterij	+ 51"
9	Nick van der Lijke (NED)	Roompot–Nederlandse Loterij	+ 54"
10	Andreas Vangstad (NOR)	Team Sparebanken Sør	+ 55"

=== Points classification ===
Result
Rank	Rider	Team	Points
1	Edvald Boasson Hagen (NOR)	Team Dimension Data	100
2	Timo Roosen (NED)	LottoNL–Jumbo	56
3	August Jensen (NOR)	Team Coop	54
4	Dries Van Gestel (BEL)	Sport Vlaanderen–Baloise	39
5	Torkil Veyhe (DEN)	Team ColoQuick–Cult	38
6	Daniel Turek (CZE)	Israel Cycling Academy	36
7	Nick van der Lijke (NED)	Roompot–Nederlandse Loterij	32
8	Jeroen Meijers (NED)	Roompot–Nederlandse Loterij	18
9	Youcef Reguigui (ALG)	Team Dimension Data	17
10	Jon Irisarri (ESP)	Caja Rural–Seguros RGA	16

=== Mountains classification ===
Result
Rank	Rider	Team	Points
1	Wilmar Paredes (COL)	Team Manzana Postobón	32
2	Markus Hoelgaard (NOR)	Joker Icopal	25
3	Jonathan Lastra (ESP)	Caja Rural–Seguros RGA	24
4	Torkil Veyhe (DEN)	Team ColoQuick–Cult	21
5	Kevin Van Melsen (BEL)	Wanty–Groupe Gobert	13
6	Jay Thomson (RSA)	Team Dimension Data	12
7	Gijs Van Hoecke (BEL)	LottoNL–Jumbo	12
8	Jon Irisarri (ESP)	Caja Rural–Seguros RGA	11
9	Serge Pauwels (BEL)	Team Dimension Data	8
10	Héctor Sáez (ESP)	Caja Rural–Seguros RGA	8

=== Young rider classification ===
Result
Rank	Rider	Team	Time
1	Dries Van Gestel (BEL)	Sport Vlaanderen–Baloise	21h 36' 34"
2	Timo Roosen (NED)	LottoNL–Jumbo	+ 20"
3	Lennard Kämna (GER)	Team Sunweb	+ 38"
4	Kasper Asgreen (DEN)	Team VéloCONCEPT	+ 42"
5	Jeroen Meijers (NED)	Roompot–Nederlandse Loterij	+ 42"
6	Andreas Vangstad (NOR)	Team Sparebanken Sør	+ 46"
7	Jesper Schultz (DEN)	Team ColoQuick–Cult	+ 3' 30"
8	Daniel Turek (CZE)	Israel Cycling Academy	+ 3' 39"
9	Aimé De Gendt (BEL)	Sport Vlaanderen–Baloise	+ 3' 53"
10	Jonas Gregaard Wilsly (DEN)	Riwal Platform	+ 4' 19"

=== Teams classification ===
Result
Rank	Team	Time
1	Roompot–Nederlandse Loterij	64h 51' 56"
2	Sport Vlaanderen–Baloise	+ 2' 30"
3	Team Dimension Data	+ 3' 27"
4	LottoNL–Jumbo	+ 4' 37"
5	Team ColoQuick–Cult	+ 14' 56"
6	Joker Icopal	+ 15' 49"
7	Riwal Platform	+ 23' 36"
8	Israel Cycling Academy	+ 32' 43"
9	CCC–Sprandi–Polkowice	+ 35' 25"
10	Team VéloCONCEPT	+ 45' 10"
