= 2019 Tour of Oman =

UCI Asia Tour

Race details
- Dates: 16–21 February 2019
- Stages: 6
- Distance: 906 km (563 mi)
- Winning time: 21h 45' 51"

Results
Jersey awarded to the overall winner	Winner	Alexey Lutsenko (Kazakhstan)	(Astana)
	Second	Domenico Pozzovivo (Italy)	(Bahrain–Merida)
	Third	Jesús Herrada (Spain)	(Cofidis)
Jersey awarded to the points classification winner	Points	Alexey Lutsenko (Kazakhstan)	(Astana)
Jersey awarded to the young rider classification winner	Young rider	Élie Gesbert (France)	(Arkéa–Samsic)
	Team	Team Katusha–Alpecin	

The 2019 Tour of Oman was a road cycling stage race that took place in Oman between 16 and 21 February 2019. It was the tenth edition of the Tour of Oman, and was rated as a 2.HC event as part of the UCI Asia Tour.

Alexey Lutsenko defended his title from last year as he won with his Astana team as he also took home the point classification.

== Teams ==
Eighteen teams were invited to start the race. These included seven UCI WorldTeams and 11 UCI Professional Continental teams. Each team had a maximum of seven riders:

UCI WorldTeams

- AG2R La Mondiale
- CCC Team
- UAE Team Emirates
- Astana
- Team Dimension Data
- Bahrain–Merida
- Team Katusha–Alpecin

UCI Professional Continental teams

- Arkéa–Samsic
- Roompot–Charles
- Wallonie Bruxelles
- Cofidis
- Euskadi–Murias
- Sport Vlaanderen–Baloise
- Wanty–Gobert
- Delko–Marseille Provence
- Rally UHC Cycling
- Vital Concept–B&B Hotels
- Direct Énergie

== Schedule ==
Stage schedule
Stage	Date	Route	Distance	Type	Winner
1	16 February	Al Sawadi Beach to Sohar	138.5 km (86.1 mi)	Flat stage	Alexander Kristoff (NOR)
2	17 February	Seeb to Al-Bustan	156.5 km (97.2 mi)	Hilly stage	Alexey Lutsenko (KAZ)
3	18 February	Shati Al-Qurm to Qurayyat	192.5 km (119.6 mi)	Hilly stage	Alexey Lutsenko (KAZ)
4	19 February	Yiti to Oman Convention and Exhibition Centre	131 km (81.4 mi)	Hilly stage	Sonny Colbrelli (ITA)
5	20 February	Samail to Al Jabal al Akhḑar	152 km (94.4 mi)	Medium-mountain stage	Alexey Lutsenko (KAZ)
6	21 February	Muscat to Matrah Corniche	135.5 km (84.2 mi)	Flat stage	Giacomo Nizzolo (ITA)

== Stages ==
=== Stage 1 ===
Stage 1 result

Rank	Rider	Team	Time
1	Alexander Kristoff (NOR)	UAE Team Emirates	2h 54' 50"
2	Bryan Coquard (FRA)	Vital Concept–B&B Hotels	s.t.
3	Nacer Bouhanni (FRA)	Cofidis	s.t.
4	Giacomo Nizzolo (ITA)	Team Dimension Data	s.t.
5	Niccolò Bonifazio (ITA)	Direct Énergie	s.t.
6	Mikel Aristi (ESP)	Euskadi–Murias	s.t.
7	Boy van Poppel (NED)	Roompot–Charles	s.t.
8	Davide Ballerini (ITA)	Astana	s.t.
9	Amaury Capiot (BEL)	Sport Vlaanderen–Baloise	s.t.
10	Emīls Liepiņš (LAT)	Wallonie Bruxelles	s.t.

General classification after Stage 1

Rank	Rider	Team	Time
1	Alexander Kristoff (NOR)	UAE Team Emirates	2h 54' 40"
2	Bryan Coquard (FRA)	Vital Concept–B&B Hotels	+ 4"
3	Michael Schär (SUI)	CCC Team	+ 5"
4	Nacer Bouhanni (FRA)	Cofidis	+ 6"
5	Giacomo Nizzolo (ITA)	Team Dimension Data	+ 10"
6	Niccolò Bonifazio (ITA)	Direct Énergie	s.t.
7	Mikel Aristi (ESP)	Euskadi–Murias	s.t.
8	Boy van Poppel (NED)	Roompot–Charles	s.t.
9	Davide Ballerini (ITA)	Astana	s.t.
10	Amaury Capiot (BEL)	Sport Vlaanderen–Baloise	s.t.

=== Stage 2 ===
Stage 2 result

Rank	Rider	Team	Time
1	Alexey Lutsenko (KAZ)	Astana	4h 07' 19"
2	Alexander Kristoff (NOR)	UAE Team Emirates	+ 3"
3	Ryan Gibbons (RSA)	Team Dimension Data	s.t.
4	Iuri Filosi (ITA)	Delko–Marseille Provence	s.t.
5	Oliver Naesen (BEL)	AG2R La Mondiale	s.t.
6	Sonny Colbrelli (ITA)	Bahrain–Merida	s.t.
7	Enrico Battaglin (ITA)	Team Katusha–Alpecin	s.t.
8	Benjamin Declercq (BEL)	Sport Vlaanderen–Baloise	s.t.
9	Clément Venturini (FRA)	AG2R La Mondiale	s.t.
10	Magnus Cort (DEN)	Astana	s.t.

General classification after Stage 2

Rank	Rider	Team	Time
1	Alexander Kristoff (NOR)	UAE Team Emirates	7h 01' 56"
2	Alexey Lutsenko (KAZ)	Astana	+ 3"
3	Ryan Gibbons (RSA)	Team Dimension Data	+ 12"
4	Clément Venturini (FRA)	AG2R La Mondiale	+ 16"
5	Iuri Filosi (ITA)	Delko–Marseille Provence	s.t.
6	Magnus Cort (DEN)	Astana	s.t.
7	Greg Van Avermaet (BEL)	CCC Team	s.t.
8	Sven Erik Bystrøm (NOR)	UAE Team Emirates	s.t.
9	Élie Gesbert (FRA)	Arkéa–Samsic	s.t.
10	Rui Costa (POR)	UAE Team Emirates	s.t.

=== Stage 3 ===
Stage 3 result

Rank	Rider	Team	Time
1	Alexey Lutsenko (KAZ)	Astana	4h 35' 48"
2	Jesús Herrada (ESP)	Cofidis	+ 1"
3	Greg Van Avermaet (BEL)	CCC Team	s.t.
4	Rui Costa (POR)	UAE Team Emirates	s.t.
5	Domenico Pozzovivo (ITA)	Bahrain–Merida	+ 4"
6	Eliot Lietaer (BEL)	Wallonie Bruxelles	+ 6"
7	Oliver Naesen (BEL)	AG2R La Mondiale	+ 11"
8	Quentin Pacher (FRA)	Vital Concept–B&B Hotels	s.t.
9	Élie Gesbert (FRA)	Arkéa–Samsic	s.t.
10	Ryan Gibbons (RSA)	Team Dimension Data	s.t.

General classification after Stage 3

Rank	Rider	Team	Time
1	Alexey Lutsenko (KAZ)	Astana	11h 37' 37"
2	Jesús Herrada (ESP)	Cofidis	+ 18"
3	Greg Van Avermaet (BEL)	CCC Team	+ 20"
4	Rui Costa (POR)	UAE Team Emirates	+ 24"
5	Domenico Pozzovivo (ITA)	Bahrain–Merida	+ 27"
6	Eliot Lietaer (BEL)	Wallonie Bruxelles	+ 29"
7	Ryan Gibbons (RSA)	Team Dimension Data	+ 30"
8	Élie Gesbert (FRA)	Arkéa–Samsic	+ 34"
9	Quentin Pacher (FRA)	Vital Concept–B&B Hotels	s.t.
10	Oliver Naesen (BEL)	AG2R La Mondiale	s.t.

=== Stage 4 ===
Stage 4 result

Rank	Rider	Team	Time
1	Sonny Colbrelli (ITA)	Bahrain–Merida	3h 17' 09"
2	Greg Van Avermaet (BEL)	CCC Team	s.t.
3	Clément Venturini (FRA)	AG2R La Mondiale	s.t.
4	Ryan Gibbons (RSA)	Team Dimension Data	s.t.
5	Alexander Kristoff (NOR)	UAE Team Emirates	s.t.
6	Benjamin Declercq (BEL)	Sport Vlaanderen–Baloise	s.t.
7	Iuri Filosi (ITA)	Delko–Marseille Provence	s.t.
8	Baptiste Planckaert (BEL)	Wallonie Bruxelles	s.t.
9	Milan Menten (BEL)	Sport Vlaanderen–Baloise	s.t.
10	Jesús Herrada (ESP)	Cofidis	s.t.

General classification after Stage 4

Rank	Rider	Team	Time
1	Alexey Lutsenko (KAZ)	Astana	14h 54' 46"
2	Greg Van Avermaet (BEL)	CCC Team	+ 14"
3	Jesús Herrada (ESP)	Cofidis	+ 18"
4	Rui Costa (POR)	UAE Team Emirates	+ 24"
5	Domenico Pozzovivo (ITA)	Bahrain–Merida	+ 27"
6	Eliot Lietaer (BEL)	Wallonie Bruxelles	+ 29"
7	Ryan Gibbons (RSA)	Team Dimension Data	+ 30"
8	Élie Gesbert (FRA)	Arkéa–Samsic	+ 34"
9	Quentin Pacher (FRA)	Vital Concept–B&B Hotels	s.t.
10	Oliver Naesen (BEL)	AG2R La Mondiale	s.t.

=== Stage 5 ===
Stage 5 result

Rank	Rider	Team	Time
1	Alexey Lutsenko (KAZ)	Astana	3h 44' 03"
2	Fabien Grellier (FRA)	Direct Énergie	+ 7"
3	Domenico Pozzovivo (ITA)	Bahrain–Merida	+ 11"
4	Rui Costa (POR)	UAE Team Emirates	+ 19"
5	Élie Gesbert (FRA)	Arkéa–Samsic	s.t.
6	Jesús Herrada (ESP)	Cofidis	s.t.
7	Jan Polanc (SLO)	UAE Team Emirates	+ 23"
8	Fabien Doubey (FRA)	Wanty–Gobert	+ 30"
9	Mathias Frank (SUI)	AG2R La Mondiale	+ 39"
10	Matteo Fabbro (ITA)	Team Katusha–Alpecin	+ 44"

General classification after Stage 5

Rank	Rider	Team	Time
1	Alexey Lutsenko (KAZ)	Astana	18h 38' 39"
2	Domenico Pozzovivo (ITA)	Bahrain–Merida	+ 44"
3	Jesús Herrada (ESP)	Cofidis	+ 47"
4	Rui Costa (POR)	UAE Team Emirates	+ 53"
5	Élie Gesbert (FRA)	Arkéa–Samsic	+ 1' 03"
6	Jan Polanc (SLO)	UAE Team Emirates	+ 1' 14"
7	Eliot Lietaer (BEL)	Wallonie Bruxelles	+ 1' 25"
8	Fabien Doubey (FRA)	Wanty–Gobert	+ 1' 31"
9	Brandon McNulty (USA)	Rally UHC Cycling	+ 1' 43"
10	Quentin Pacher (FRA)	Vital Concept–B&B Hotels	+ 1' 51"

=== Stage 6 ===
Stage 6 result

Rank	Rider	Team	Time
1	Giacomo Nizzolo (ITA)	Team Dimension Data	3h 07' 12"
2	Sonny Colbrelli (ITA)	Bahrain–Merida	s.t.
3	Davide Ballerini (ITA)	Astana	s.t.
4	Clément Venturini (FRA)	AG2R La Mondiale	s.t.
5	Ryan Gibbons (RSA)	Team Dimension Data	s.t.
6	Boris Vallée (BEL)	Wanty–Gobert	s.t.
7	Reto Hollenstein (SUI)	Team Katusha–Alpecin	s.t.
8	Amaury Capiot (BEL)	Sport Vlaanderen–Baloise	s.t.
9	Bryan Coquard (FRA)	Vital Concept–B&B Hotels	s.t.
10	Sven Erik Bystrøm (NOR)	UAE Team Emirates	s.t.

== Final standings ==
Final general classification

Rank	Rider	Team	Time
1	Alexey Lutsenko (KAZ)	Astana	21h 45' 51"
2	Domenico Pozzovivo (ITA)	Bahrain–Merida	+ 44"
3	Jesús Herrada (ESP)	Cofidis	+ 47"
4	Rui Costa (POR)	UAE Team Emirates	+ 53"
5	Élie Gesbert (FRA)	Arkéa–Samsic	+ 1' 03"
6	Jan Polanc (SLO)	UAE Team Emirates	+ 1' 14"
7	Eliot Lietaer (BEL)	Sport Vlaanderen–Baloise	+ 1' 25"
8	Fabien Doubey (FRA)	Wanty–Gobert	+ 1' 31"
9	Brandon McNulty (USA)	Rally UHC Cycling	+ 1' 43"
10	Quentin Pacher (FRA)	Vital Concept–B&B Hotels	+ 1' 51"

Final points classification

Rank	Rider	Team	Points
1	Alexey Lutsenko (KAZ)	Astana	45
2	Sonny Colbrelli (ITA)	Bahrain–Merida	32
3	Ryan Gibbons (RSA)	Team Dimension Data	23
4	Giacomo Nizzolo (ITA)	Team Dimension Data	22
5	Greg Van Avermaet (BEL)	CCC Team	21
6	Jesús Herrada (ESP)	Cofidis	18
7	Clément Venturini (FRA)	AG2R La Mondiale	18
8	Domenico Pozzovivo (ITA)	Bahrain–Merida	15
9	Rui Costa (POR)	UAE Team Emirates	14
10	Bryan Coquard (FRA)	Vital Concept–B&B Hotels	14

Final young rider classification

Rank	Rider	Team	Time
1	Élie Gesbert (FRA)	Arkéa–Samsic	21h 46' 54"
2	Brandon McNulty (USA)	Rally UHC Cycling	+ 40"
3	Steff Cras (BEL)	Team Katusha–Alpecin	+ 50"
4	Matteo Fabbro (ITA)	Team Katusha–Alpecin	+ 57"
5	Ryan Gibbons (RSA)	Team Dimension Data	+ 1' 20"
6	Benjamin Declercq (BEL)	Sport Vlaanderen–Baloise	+ 2' 32"
7	Julien Mortier (BEL)	Wallonie Bruxelles	+ 7' 49"
8	Patrick Müller (SUI)	Vital Concept–B&B Hotels	+ 11' 11"
9	Milan Menten (BEL)	Sport Vlaanderen–Baloise	+ 13' 51"
10	Fabien Grellier (FRA)	Direct Énergie	+ 16' 33"

Final teams classification

Rank	Team	Time
1	Team Katusha–Alpecin	65h 25' 36"
2	Team Dimension Data	+ 1' 30"
3	AG2R La Mondiale	+ 5' 17"
4	CCC Team	+ 6' 27"
5	UAE Team Emirates	+ 8' 15"
6	Cofidis	+ 9' 02"
7	Bahrain–Merida	+ 10' 46"
8	Astana	+ 13' 17"
9	Roompot–Charles	+ 14' 33"
10	Wallonie Bruxelles	+ 16' 09"
