= 2019 Volta Limburg Classic =

2019 UCI Europe Tour

Race details
- Dates: 6 April 2019
- Stages: 1
- Distance: 192.1 km (119.4 mi)
- Winning time: 4h 53' 11"

Results
	Winner	Patrick Müller (SUI)	(Vital Concept–B&B Hotels)
	Second	Justin Jules (FRA)	(Wallonie Bruxelles)
	Third	Ben Hermans (BEL)	(Israel Cycling Academy)

The 2019 Volta Limburg Classic was the 46th edition of the Volta Limburg Classic cycle race and was held on 6 April 2019 as part of the 2019 UCI Europe Tour. The race started and finished in Eijsden. The race was won by Patrick Müller.

== Teams ==
Twenty-four teams were invited to take part in the race. These included seven UCI Professional Continental teams and seventeen UCI Continental teams.

UCI Professional Continental Teams

- Israel Cycling Academy
- Riwal Readynez
- Roompot–Charles
- Sport Vlaanderen–Baloise
- Vital Concept–B&B Hotels
- Wallonie Bruxelles
- Wanty–Gobert

UCI Continental Teams

- Alecto Cycling Team
- BEAT Cycling Club
- Bike Aid
- Canyon dhb p/b Bloor Homes
- CCC Development Team
- Cibel–Cebon
- Development Team Sunweb
- Joker Fuel of Norway
- Leopard Pro Cycling
- Lotto–Kern Haus
- Madison Genesis
- Metec–TKH
- Monkey Town - à Bloc
- Tarteletto–Isorex
- Team Differdange–Geba
- Team Waoo
- Vlasman Cycling Team

== Results ==
Result
Rank	Rider	Team	Time
1	Patrick Müller (SUI)	Vital Concept–B&B Hotels	4h 53' 11"
2	Justin Jules (FRA)	Wallonie Bruxelles	+ 4"
3	Ben Hermans (BEL)	Israel Cycling Academy	+ 4"
4	Quentin Pacher (FRA)	Vital Concept–B&B Hotels	+ 25"
5	Rasmus Guldhammer (DEN)	Team Waoo	+ 29"
6	Ole Forfang (NOR)	Joker Fuel of Norway	+ 50"
7	Lennart Teugels (BEL)	Cibel–Cebon	+ 52"
8	Kevin Deltombe (BEL)	Sport Vlaanderen–Baloise	+ 52"
9	Mathijs Paasschens (NED)	Wallonie Bruxelles	+ 52"
10	Piotr Havik (NED)	BEAT Cycling Club	+ 52"
