= 2017 Arctic Race of Norway =

2017 UCI Europe Tour

Race details
- Dates: 10–13 August
- Stages: 4
- Winning time: 15h 56' 15"

Results
Jersey awarded to the overall winner	Winner	Dylan Teuns (BEL)	(BMC Racing Team)
	Second	August Jensen (NOR)	(Team Coop)
	Third	Michel Kreder (NED)	(Aqua Blue Sport)
Jersey awarded to the points classification winner	Points	Dylan Teuns (BEL)	(BMC Racing Team)
Jersey awarded to the mountains classification winner	Mountains	Bernhard Eisel (AUT)	(Team Dimension Data)
Jersey awarded to the youth classification winner	Youth	Dylan Teuns (BEL)	(BMC Racing Team)
	Team	Joker Icopal	

The 2017 Arctic Race of Norway is a four-stage cycling stage race taking place in Norway between 10 and 13 August. It is the fifth edition of the Arctic Race of Norway and is rated as a 2.HC event as part of the UCI Europe Tour.

== Race schedule ==
List of stages
Stage	Date	Course	Distance	Type	Winner
1	10 August	Engenes to Narvik	156.5 km (97 mi)	Hilly stage	Dylan Teuns (BEL)
2	11 August	Sjøvegan to Bardufoss Airport	184.5 km (115 mi)	Flat stage	Alexander Kristoff (NOR)
3	12 August	Lyngseidet to Finnvikdalen	185.5 km (115 mi)	Hilly stage	August Jensen (NOR)
4	13 August	Tromsø to Tromsø	160.5 km (100 mi)	Hilly stage	Dylan Teuns (BEL)

== Teams ==
21 teams were invited to take part in the race. Five of these were UCI WorldTeams; 12 were UCI Professional Continental teams; four were UCI Continental teams. Each team was allowed to enter six riders, three teams only entered five, therefore the peloton at the start of the race was made up of 123 riders.

UCI WorldTeams

- Astana
- BMC Racing Team
- Team Dimension Data
- Team Katusha–Alpecin
- Team Sunweb

UCI Professional Continental teams

- Aqua Blue Sport
- CCC–Sprandi–Polkowice
- Cofidis
- Delko–Marseille Provence KTM
- Direct Énergie
- Gazprom–RusVelo
- Nippo–Vini Fantini
- Sport Vlaanderen–Baloise
- Team Novo Nordisk
- Wanty–Groupe Gobert
- WB Veranclassic Aqua Protect
- Fortuneo–Oscaro

UCI Continental teams

- Joker Icopal
- Team Coop
- Team FixIT.no
- Team Sparebanken Sør

== Stages ==
=== Stage 1 ===
10 August 2017 – Engenes to Narvik, 156.5 km (97.2 mi)

Stage 1 result
Rank	Rider	Team	Time
1	Dylan Teuns (BEL)	BMC Racing Team	3h 36' 14"
2	August Jensen (NOR)	Team Coop	+ 2"
3	Andrea Pasqualon (ITA)	Wanty–Groupe Gobert	+ 2"
4	Olivier Pardini (BEL)	WB Veranclassic Aqua Protect	+ 2"
5	Carl Fredrik Hagen (NOR)	Joker Icopal	+ 2"
6	Markus Hoelgaard (NOR)	Joker Icopal	+ 2"
7	Alexander Kristoff (NOR)	Team Katusha–Alpecin	+ 2"
8	Eliot Lietaer (BEL)	Sport Vlaanderen–Baloise	+ 2"
9	Michel Kreder (NED)	Aqua Blue Sport	+ 2"
10	Fabien Grellier (FRA)	Direct Énergie	+ 2"
Source: ProCyclingStats

General classification after stage 1
Rank	Rider	Team	Time
1	Dylan Teuns (BEL)	BMC Racing Team	3h 36' 04"
2	August Jensen (NOR)	Team Coop	+ 6"
3	Andrea Pasqualon (ITA)	Wanty–Groupe Gobert	+ 8"
4	Markus Hoelgaard (NOR)	Joker Icopal	+ 11"
5	Olivier Pardini (BEL)	WB Veranclassic Aqua Protect	+ 12"
6	Carl Fredrik Hagen (NOR)	Joker Icopal	+ 12"
7	Alexander Kristoff (NOR)	Team Katusha–Alpecin	+ 12"
8	Eliot Lietaer (BEL)	Sport Vlaanderen–Baloise	+ 12"
9	Michel Kreder (NED)	Aqua Blue Sport	+ 12"
10	Fabien Grellier (FRA)	Direct Énergie	+ 12"
Source: ProCyclingStats

=== Stage 2 ===
11 August 2017 – Sjøvegan to Bardufoss Airport, 184.5 km (114.6 mi)

Stage 2 result
Rank	Rider	Team	Time
1	Alexander Kristoff (NOR)	Team Katusha–Alpecin	4h 14' 20"
2	Hugo Hofstetter (FRA)	Cofidis	s.t.
3	Andrea Pasqualon (ITA)	Wanty–Groupe Gobert	s.t.
4	Robin Stenuit (BEL)	Wanty–Groupe Gobert	s.t.
5	Adrien Petit (FRA)	Direct Énergie	s.t.
6	Kristoffer Halvorsen (NOR)	Joker Icopal	s.t.
7	Eduard-Michael Grosu (ROM)	Nippo–Vini Fantini	s.t.
8	Ivan Savitskiy (RUS)	Gazprom–RusVelo	s.t.
9	Roy Jans (BEL)	WB Veranclassic Aqua Protect	s.t.
10	Eliot Lietaer (BEL)	Sport Vlaanderen–Baloise	s.t.
Source: ProCyclingStats

General classification after stage 2
Rank	Rider	Team	Time
1	Dylan Teuns (BEL)	BMC Racing Team	7h 50' 23"
2	Andrea Pasqualon (ITA)	Wanty–Groupe Gobert	+ 2"
3	Alexander Kristoff (NOR)	Team Katusha–Alpecin	+ 3"
4	August Jensen (NOR)	Team Coop	+ 7"
5	Michel Kreder (NED)	Aqua Blue Sport	+ 11"
6	Markus Hoelgaard (NOR)	Joker Icopal	+ 12"
7	Eliot Lietaer (BEL)	Sport Vlaanderen–Baloise	+ 13"
8	Ivan Savitskiy (RUS)	Gazprom–RusVelo	+ 13"
9	Bjørn Tore Hoem (NOR)	Joker Icopal	+ 13"
10	Quentin Pacher (FRA)	Delko–Marseille Provence KTM	+ 13"
Source: ProCyclingStats

=== Stage 3 ===
12 August 2017 – Lyngseidet to Finnvikdalen, 185.5 km (115.3 mi)

Stage 3 result
Rank	Rider	Team	Time
1	August Jensen (NOR)	Team Coop	4h 19' 05"
2	Dylan Teuns (BEL)	BMC Racing Team	s.t.
3	Dorian Godon (FRA)	Cofidis	s.t.
4	Michel Kreder (NED)	Aqua Blue Sport	s.t.
5	Eliot Lietaer (BEL)	Sport Vlaanderen–Baloise	s.t.
6	Quentin Pacher (FRA)	Delko–Marseille Provence KTM	s.t.
7	Rein Taaramäe (EST)	Team Katusha–Alpecin	+ 4"
8	Bjørn Tore Hoem (NOR)	Joker Icopal	+ 4"
9	Carl Fredrik Hagen (NOR)	Joker Icopal	+ 4"
10	Jakub Kaczmarek (POL)	CCC–Sprandi–Polkowice	+ 4"
Source: ProCyclingStats

General classification after stage 3
Rank	Rider	Team	Time
1	Dylan Teuns (BEL)	BMC Racing Team	12h 09' 22"
2	August Jensen (NOR)	Team Coop	+ 3"
3	Michel Kreder (NED)	Aqua Blue Sport	+ 17"
4	Eliot Lietaer (BEL)	Sport Vlaanderen–Baloise	+ 19"
5	Alexander Kristoff (NOR)	Team Katusha–Alpecin	+ 19"
6	Quentin Pacher (FRA)	Delko–Marseille Provence KTM	+ 19"
7	Bjørn Tore Hoem (NOR)	Joker Icopal	+ 23"
8	Carl Fredrik Hagen (NOR)	Joker Icopal	+ 23"
9	Amanuel Gebrezgabihier (ERI)	Team Dimension Data	+ 29"
10	Jonas Koch (GER)	CCC–Sprandi–Polkowice	+ 33"
Source: ProCyclingStats

=== Stage 4 ===
13 August 2017 – Tromsø to Tromsø, 160.5 km (99.7 mi)

Stage 4 result
Rank	Rider	Team	Time
1	Dylan Teuns (BEL)	BMC Racing Team	3h 47' 03"
2	Loïc Chetout (FRA)	Cofidis	+ 11"
3	Sven Erik Bystrøm (NOR)	Team Katusha–Alpecin	+ 11"
4	Andriy Hrivko (UKR)	Astana	+ 11"
5	Olivier Pardini (BEL)	WB Veranclassic Aqua Protect	+ 16"
6	Bjørn Tore Hoem (NOR)	Joker Icopal	+ 16"
7	Alexander Kristoff (NOR)	Team Katusha–Alpecin	+ 16"
8	Quentin Pacher (FRA)	Delko–Marseille Provence KTM	+ 16"
9	Lawrence Naesen (BEL)	WB Veranclassic Aqua Protect	+ 16"
10	Amanuel Gebrezgabihier (ERI)	Team Dimension Data	+ 16"
Source: ProCyclingStats

Final general classification
Rank	Rider	Team	Time
1	Dylan Teuns (BEL)	BMC Racing Team	15h 56' 15"
2	August Jensen (NOR)	Team Coop	+ 29"
3	Michel Kreder (NED)	Aqua Blue Sport	+ 43"
5	Alexander Kristoff (NOR)	Team Katusha–Alpecin	+ 45"
4	Eliot Lietaer (BEL)	Sport Vlaanderen–Baloise	+ 45"
6	Quentin Pacher (FRA)	Delko–Marseille Provence KTM	+ 45"
7	Bjørn Tore Hoem (NOR)	Joker Icopal	+ 49"
8	Carl Fredrik Hagen (NOR)	Joker Icopal	+ 49"
9	Amanuel Gebrezgabihier (ERI)	Team Dimension Data	+ 55"
10	Andriy Hrivko (UKR)	Astana	+ 57"
Source: ProCyclingStats

== Classifications ==
The race included four main classifications: the general classification, the points classification, the mountains classification and the youth classification. There was also an award for the most aggressive rider on each stage and a team classification.

Stage	Winner	General classification	Points classification	Mountains classification	Youth classification	Team classification	Combativity award
1	Dylan Teuns	Dylan Teuns	Dylan Teuns	Bernhard Eisel	Dylan Teuns	Joker Icopal	Bernhard Eisel
2	Alexander Kristoff	Dylan Teuns	Andrea Pasqualon	Bernhard Eisel	Dylan Teuns	Joker Icopal	Dimitri Claeys
3	August Jensen	Dylan Teuns	Dylan Teuns	Bernhard Eisel	Dylan Teuns	Joker Icopal	Ole André Austevoll
4	Dylan Teuns	Dylan Teuns	Dylan Teuns	Bernhard Eisel	Dylan Teuns	Joker Icopal	Dimitri Claeys
Final		Dylan Teuns	Dylan Teuns	Bernhard Eisel	Dylan Teuns	Joker Icopal	not awarded
