= Lennard Kämna =

German bicycle racer

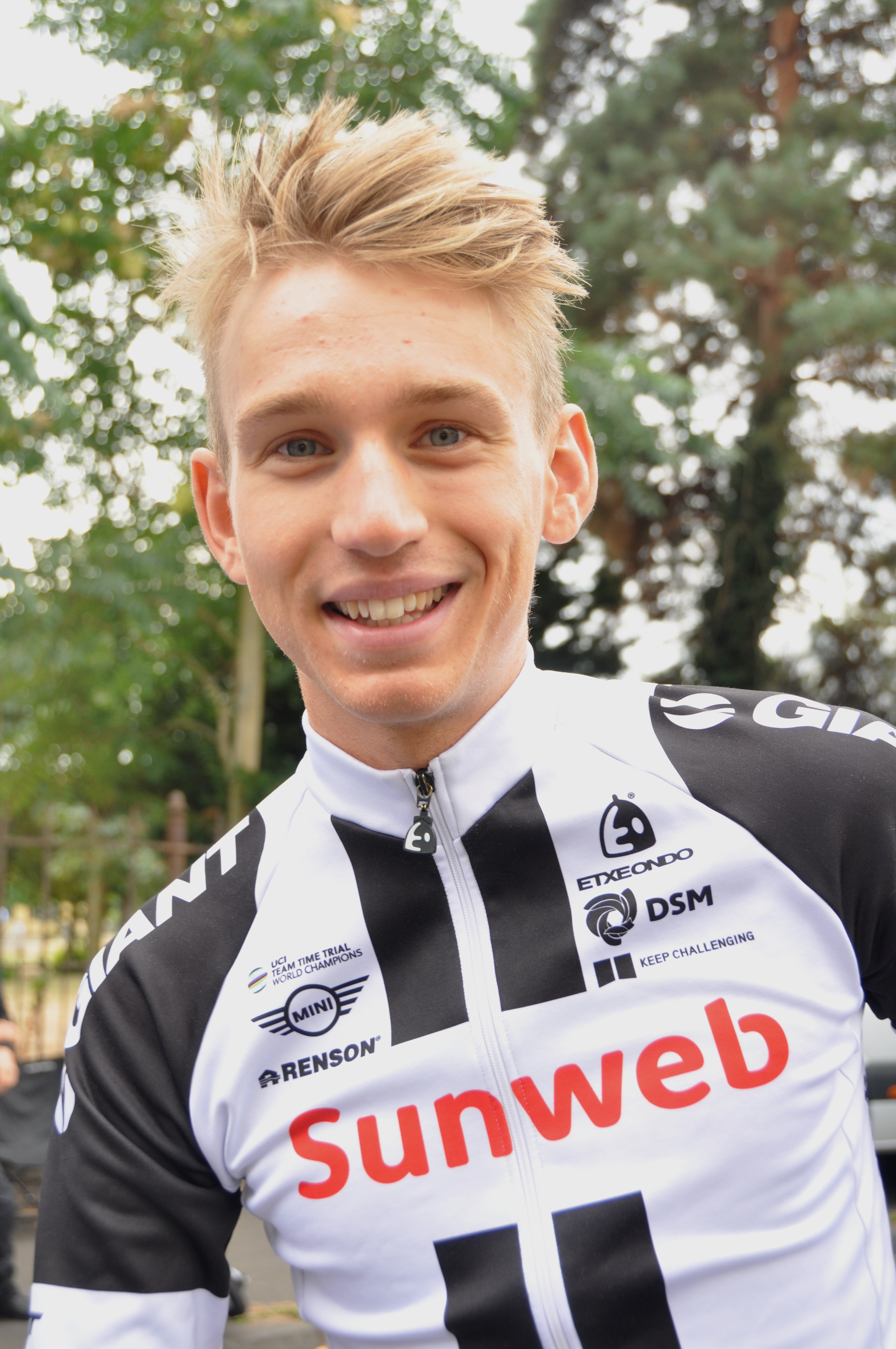
- Kämna at the 2018 Deutschland Tour

Personal information
- Born: 9 September 1996 (age 30) Wedel, Germany
- Height: 1.81 m (5 ft 11 in)
- Weight: 65 kg (143 lb; 10.2 st)

Cycling career
- Sport: Cycling
- Current team: Lidl–Trek
- Discipline: Road
- Role: Rider
- Rider type: All-rounder

Amateur teams
- 2007–2010: RRG Bremen
- 2011–2014: RSC Cottbus

Professional teams
- 2015–2016: Team Stölting
- 2017–2019: Team Sunweb
- 2020–2024: Bora–Hansgrohe
- 2025–: Lidl–Trek

Major wins
- Grand Tours Tour de France 1 individual stage (2020) Giro d'Italia 1 individual stage (2022) Vuelta a España 1 individual stage (2023) One-day races and Classics National Time Trial Championships (2022)
Medal record
World Championships
Representing Germany
Gold medal – first place	2014 Ponferrada	Junior time trial
Bronze medal – third place	2015 Richmond	Under-23 time trial
Silver medal – second place	2017 Bergen	Under-23 road race
Representing Team Sunweb
Gold medal – first place	2017 Bergen	Team time trial
European Championships
Gold medal – first place	2014 Nyon	Junior time trial
Gold medal – first place	2016 Plumelec	Under-23 time trial

Lennard Kämna (born 9 September 1996) is a German professional road racing cyclist, who currently rides for UCI WorldTeam Lidl–Trek.

== Career ==
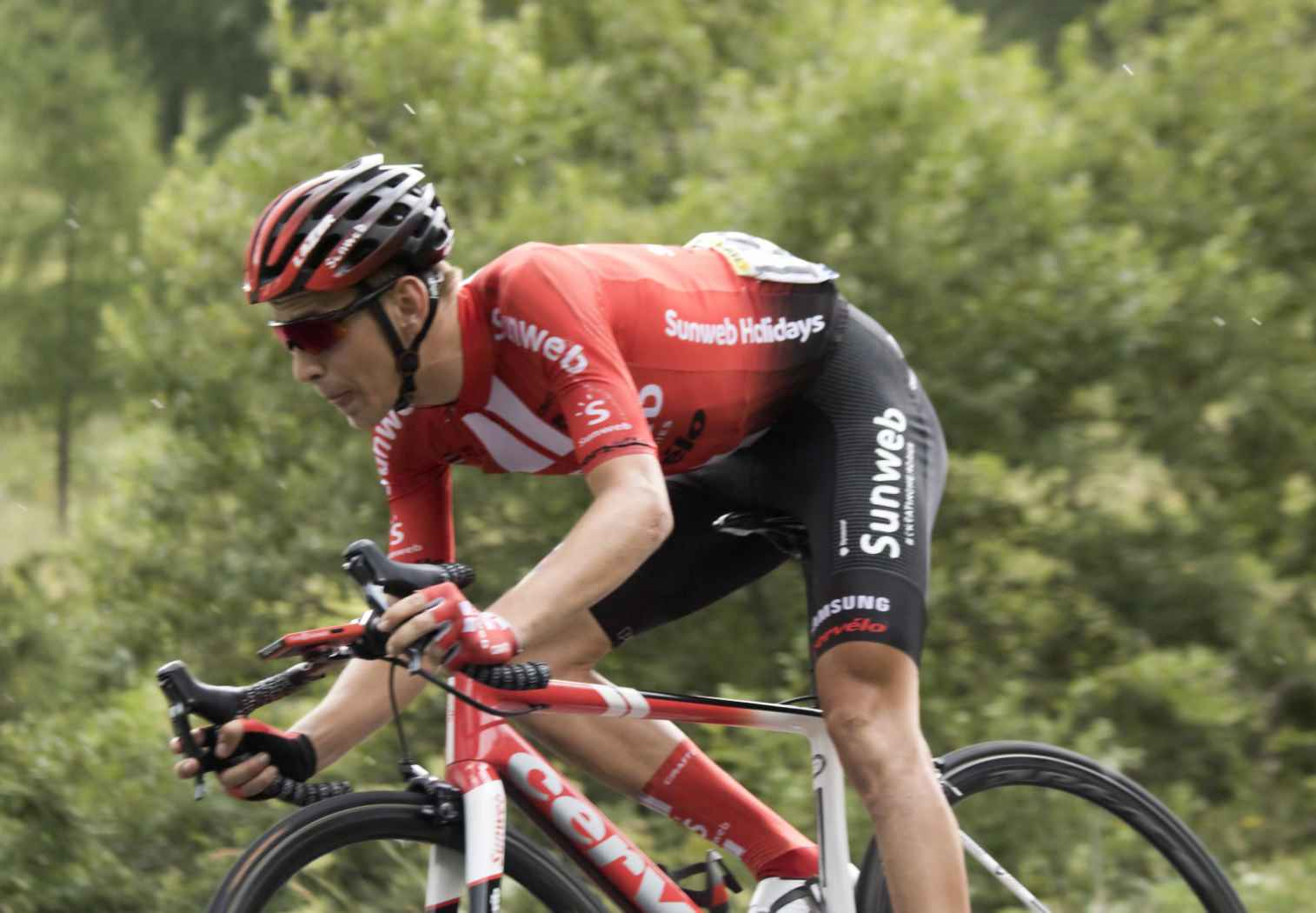
Kämna at the 2019 Tour de France

=== Junior cycling ===
At the age of 14, Kämna left his family home in Bremen to attend a sports school in Cottbus. In 2014, he became the junior world champion in the individual time trial at the UCI Road World Championships, having already won the German and European championships at the same level earlier in the year.

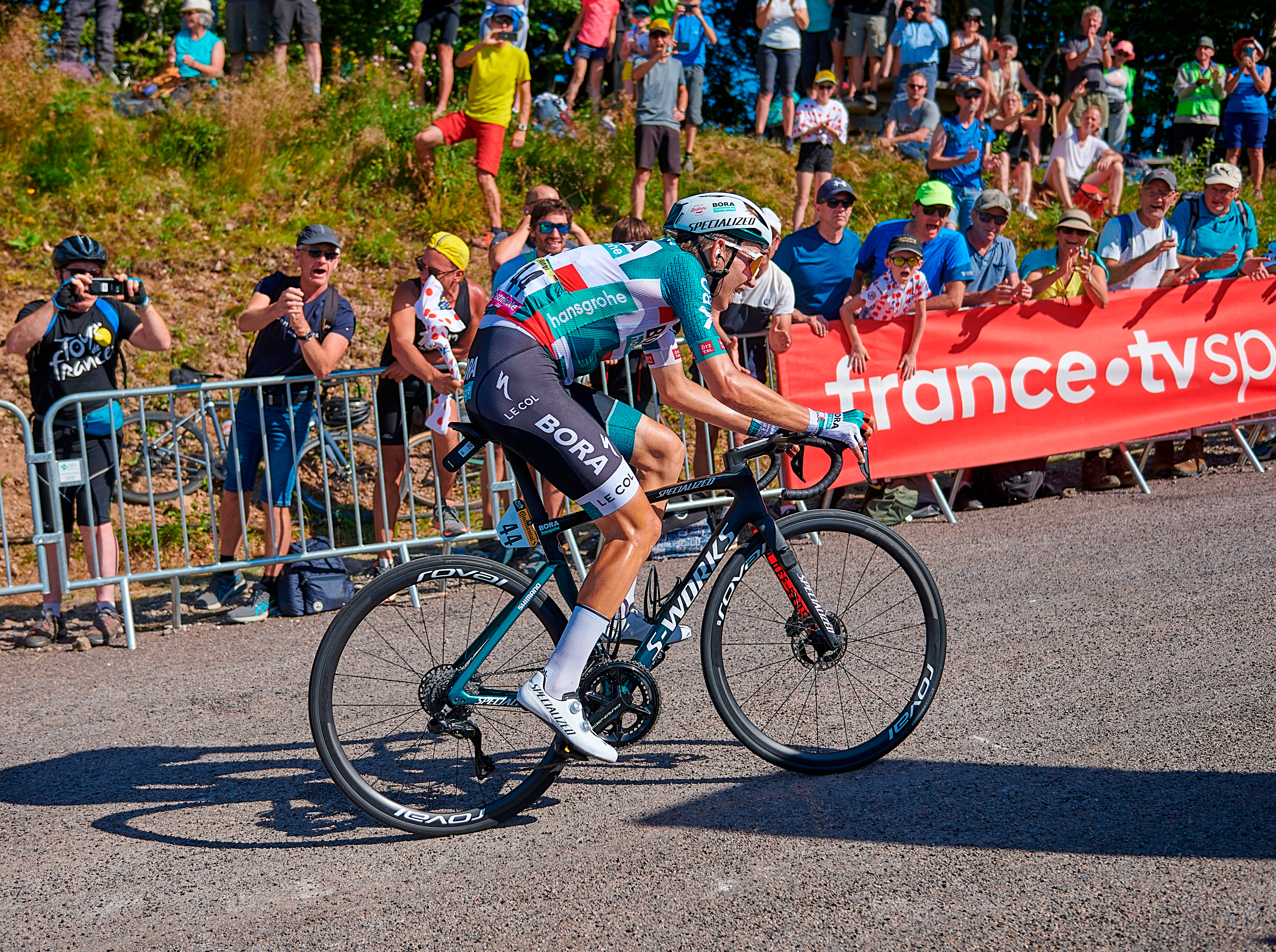
Kamna at the 2022 Tour de France

A year later, he finished third in the under-23 time trial at the World Championships in Richmond. His effort was impeded by strong winds and light rain, a fact that benefited first and second placed Mads Würtz Schmidt and Maximilian Schachmann, who both started earlier in the day. In June 2015, he also became the German under-23 champion in the time trial.

=== Professional career ===
He rode with Team Stölting in 2015, before his team and Cult Energy Pro Cycling merged for the 2016 season. In his first year as a professional, he won the German under-23 Bundesliga and became German mountain champion (Deutsche Bergmeisterschaften). On 14 September 2016, Kämna won the gold medal in the under-23 time trial event at the European Road Championships in Plumelec, France.

He rode in the 2017 Vuelta a España, and completed 17 stages of the race. At the 2017 UCI Road World Championships, Kämna was part of the Team Sunweb squad that took the gold medal in the men's team time trial competition, and went on to claim the silver medal in the under-23 road race behind Benoît Cosnefroy. In June 2018 Sunweb announced that Kämna would take a break from cycle racing "reflect on his long-term career goals", having not raced since Milan-San Remo earlier that year due to illness. In July 2019, he was named in the startlist for the 2019 Tour de France.

Kämna took his first senior individual race win at the 2020 Critérium du Dauphiné, where he won the fourth stage. Shortly afterwards he rode the 2020 Tour de France, where he took his first Grand Tour stage win on stage 16 of the race, attacking a reducing lead group on the penultimate climb and being joined by Richard Carapaz, and subsequently countering an attack by Carapaz and building up a lead on the descent and the last climb to win by one and a half minutes. He had previously narrowly missed out on the win on the thirteenth stage of the race, losing out in the final sprint to Daniel Martínez at the summit finish on Puy Mary. Kamna won stage four of the 2022 Giro d’Italia after being part of a breakaway group on a mountain stage. Kamna was part of three breakaways during the 2022 Tour de France but failed to win a stage, although he briefly held the virtual yellow jersey during stage 10 and finished that stage second in the general classification. In the second half of the race, he caught a persistent cold, and withdrew when his condition failed to improve after the second rest day.

== Major results ==
2013
4th Overall Int. 3-Etappenfahrt der Rad-Junioren
2014
1st Time trial, UCI Junior Road World Championships
1st Time trial, UEC European Junior Road Championships
1st Time trial, National Junior Road Championships
1st National Junior Hillclimb Championships
1st Overall Grand Prix Rüebliland

1st Stage 1

2nd Overall Tour of Istria - Memorial Edi Rajkovic

1st Stage 2

2nd Overall Trofeo Karlsberg

1st Stage 2b (ITT)

4th Overall Peace Race Juniors
2015
1st Time trial, National Under-23 Road Championships
1st Stage 4 Giro della Valle d'Aosta Mont Blanc
UCI Under-23 Road World Championships

3rd Time trial
10th Road race

6th Overall Course de la Paix Under-23
9th Giro del Belvedere
2016
1st Time trial, UEC European Under-23 Road Championships
4th Time trial, UCI Under-23 Road World Championships
6th Overall Circuit des Ardennes

1st Young rider classification

2017
UCI Road World Championships

1st Team time trial
2nd Under-23 road race

5th Overall Tour des Fjords
2020 (2 pro wins)
1st Stage 16 Tour de France
3rd Overall Vuelta a Murcia
4th Pollença–Andratx
7th Overall Volta ao Algarve
8th Overall Critérium du Dauphiné

1st Stage 4

2021 (1)
1st Stage 5 Volta a Catalunya
2022 (4)
1st Time trial, National Road Championships
Giro d'Italia

1st Stage 4
Held after Stages 4–6
Combativity award Stage 1

1st Stage 3 Tour of the Alps
1st Stage 5 Vuelta a Andalucía
4th Faun-Ardèche Classic
4th Clásica Jaén Paraíso Interior
2023 (2)
1st Stage 9 Vuelta a España
4th Overall Tirreno–Adriatico
6th Overall Tour of the Alps

1st Stage 3

9th Overall Giro d'Italia
2024
8th Overall Tirreno–Adriatico
2025
National Road Championships

3rd Time trial
4th Road race

6th Overall Tour de Suisse
6th Overall Tour of Austria

=== Grand Tour general classification results timeline ===
Grand Tour	2017	2018	2019	2020	2021	2022	2023	2024	2025	2026
Giro d'Italia	—	—	—	—	—	19	9	—	—	—
Tour de France	—	—	40	33	—	DNF	—	—	—	—
Vuelta a España	DNF	—	—	—	—	—	30	—	—	71

Legend
—	Did not compete
DNF	Did not finish
