= Eliot Lietaer =

Belgian road cyclist

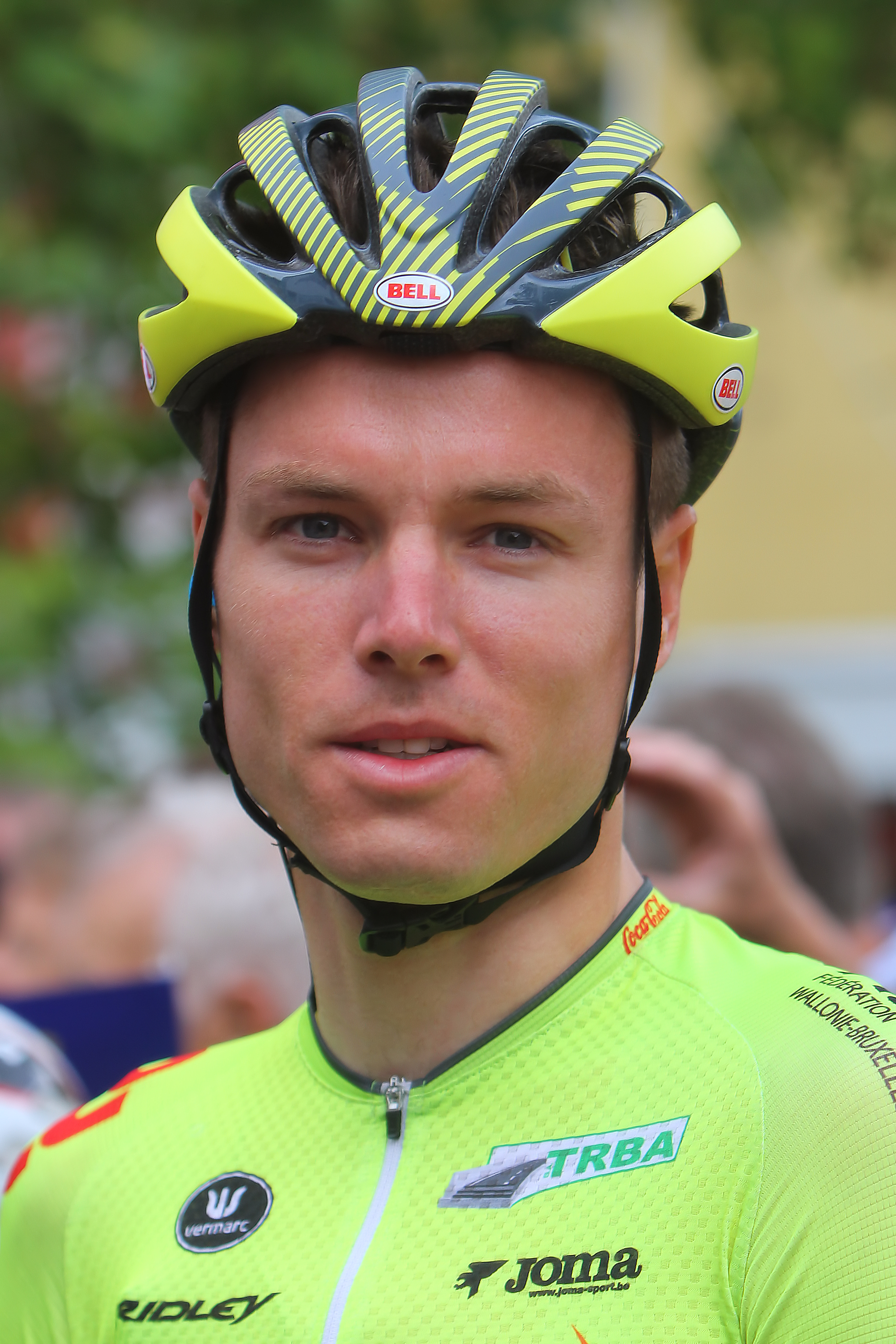
- Lietaer at the 2019 Tour of Austria

Personal information
- Full name: Eliot Lietaer
- Born: 15 August 1990 (age 36) Kortrijk
- Height: 188 cm (6 ft 2 in)
- Weight: 69 kg (152 lb)

Cycling career
- Sport: Cycling
- Current team: Retired
- Discipline: Road
- Role: Rider

Amateur teams
- 2010: Beveren 2000
- 2011: EFC–Quick-Step

Professional teams
- 2012–2017: Topsport Vlaanderen–Mercator
- 2018–2020: WB Aqua Protect Veranclassic
- 2021–2022: B&B Hotels p/b KTM

Eliot Lietaer (born 15 August 1990 in Kortrijk) is a Belgian former cyclist, who competed as a professional from 2012 to 2022.

== Major results ==
2007
3rd Tour of Flanders Juniors
2008
3rd Overall Peace Race Juniors

1st Stage 5

9th Overall Kroz Istru

1st Stage 3

2009
6th Grand Prix Criquielion
2011
1st Ronde van Namen
1st Overall Trois jours de Cherbourg

1st Stage 1

2nd Tour de Moselle
3rd Road race, National Under-23 Road Championships
6th De Vlaamse Pijl
2012
5th Kampioenschap van Vlaanderen
9th Tour de Vendée
2013
3rd Gooikse Pijl
2014
1st Stage 2 Boucles de la Mayenne
8th Overall Tour of Slovenia
2015
9th Overall Étoile de Bessèges
2016
6th Overall Tour of Slovenia
8th Overall Tour of Norway
9th Overall Settimana Internazionale di Coppi e Bartali
9th Overall Circuit de la Sarthe
2017
5th Overall Arctic Race of Norway
6th Overall Tour des Fjords
7th Circuito de Getxo
8th Overall Tour de Wallonie
2018
9th Classic de l'Ardèche
2019
7th Overall Tour of Oman
10th Overall Étoile de Bessèges
2020
9th Circuito de Getxo
2021
4th Trofeo Calvia
