= 2018 Classic de l'Ardèche =

- 2018 UCI Europe Tour

Race details
- Dates: 24 February 2018
- Stages: 1
- Distance: 200.2 km (124.4 mi)
- Winning time: 5h 37' 13"

Results
	Winner	Romain Bardet (FRA)	(AG2R La Mondiale)
	Second	Maximilian Schachmann (GER)	(Quick-Step Floors)
	Third	Lilian Calmejane (FRA)	(Direct Énergie)

The 2018 Faun Environnement - Classic de l'Ardèche Rhône Crussol was the 18th edition of the Classic Sud-Ardèche road cycling one day race. It was part of UCI Europe Tour in category 1.1.

== Teams ==
Twenty-two teams were invited to take part in the race. These included five UCI World Tour teams, thirteen UCI Professional Continental teams, three UCI Continental teams and one national team.

UCI WorldTeams

- AG2R La Mondiale
- Trek–Segafredo
- Quick-Step Floors
- Astana
- Groupama–FDJ

UCI Professional Continental teams

- Delko–Marseille Provence KTM
- Direct Énergie
- Fortuneo–Samsic
- Cofidis
- Vital Concept
- Aqua Blue Sport
- Androni Giocattoli–Sidermec
- WB Aqua Protect Veranclassic
- Roompot–Nederlandse Loterij
- Nippo–Vini Fantini–Europa Ovini
- Bardiani–CSF
- Wanty–Groupe Gobert
- Rally Cycling

UCI Continental teams

- Roubaix–Lille Métropole
- St. Michel–Auber93
- Team Virtu Cycling

National team

- France

== General classification ==
Result
Rank	Rider	Team	Time
1	Romain Bardet (FRA)	AG2R La Mondiale	5h 37' 13"
2	Maximilian Schachmann (GER)	Quick-Step Floors	+ 47"
3	Lilian Calmejane (FRA)	Direct Énergie	+ 56"
4	Alexis Vuillermoz (FRA)	AG2R La Mondiale	+ 56"
5	David Gaudu (FRA)	Groupama–FDJ	+ 56"
6	Jhonatan Narváez (COL)	Quick-Step Floors	+ 56"
7	Quentin Pacher (FRA)	Vital Concept	+ 56"
8	Pierre Latour (FRA)	AG2R La Mondiale	+ 56"
9	Eliot Lietaer (BEL)	WB Aqua Protect Veranclassic	+ 1'09"
10	Romain Sicard (FRA)	Direct Énergie	+ 1'09"
