= August Jensen =

Norwegian cyclist (born 1991)

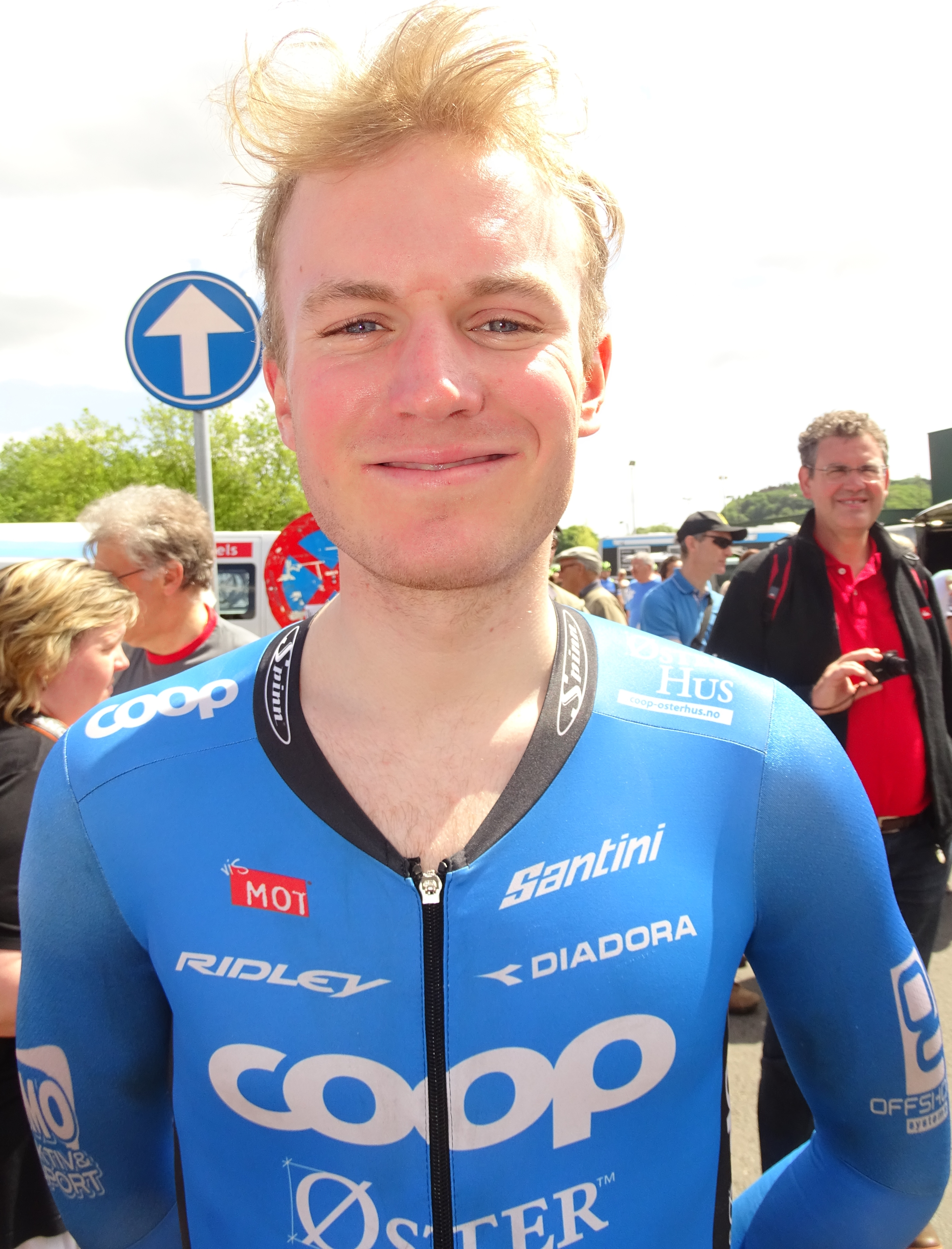
- Jensen in 2015.

Personal information
- Full name: August Jensen
- Born: 29 August 1991 (age 35) Bodø, Norway
- Height: 1.76 m (5 ft 9 in)
- Weight: 67 kg (148 lb)

Cycling career
- Sport: Cycling
- Current team: Retired
- Discipline: Road
- Role: Rider

Professional teams
- 2013–2017: Team Øster Hus–Ridley
- 2018–2019: Israel Cycling Academy
- 2020: Riwal Readynez
- 2021: Delko
- 2022–2023: Human Powered Health

August Jensen (born 29 August 1991) is a Norwegian former cyclist, who competed as a professional from 2013 to 2023.

== Major results ==
2012
1st Road race, National Under-23 Road Championships
1st Stage 2 Tour of Jämtland
2014
1st Mountains classification Kreiz Breizh Elites
1st Mountains classification Arctic Race of Norway
2015
1st Overall Circuit des Plages Vendéennes

1st Stages 2 & 4

1st Overall Kreiz Breizh Elites

1st Stage 4

1st Mountains classification Arctic Race of Norway
5th Skive–Løbet
5th Ringerike GP
6th Hadeland GP
2016
1st Overall GP Liberty Seguros

1st Stage 1

4th GP Viborg
6th Overall East Bohemia Tour
9th Ringerike GP
10th Overall Tour of Norway
2017
Oberösterreich Rundfahrt

1st Points classification
1st Stages 3 & 4

2nd Overall Arctic Race of Norway

1st Stage 3

4th Overall Tour de Normandie
4th Overall Tour des Fjords
4th Ringerike GP
4th Grote Prijs Jef Scherens
4th Kampioenschap van Vlaanderen
5th Overall Tour of Norway
6th Overall Kreiz Breizh Elites

1st Points classification

9th Grand Prix de la Ville de Lillers
9th Heistse Pijl
10th Overall Tour du Loir-et-Cher

1st Stage 5

2018
5th Elfstedenronde
8th Halle–Ingooigem
10th Primus Classic
2019
8th Veenendaal–Veenendaal Classic
8th Omloop Mandel-Leie-Schelde
2020
8th Paris–Tours
10th Overall Tour of Saudi Arabia
2021
10th Paris–Bourges
