= Quentin Pacher =

French bicycle racer

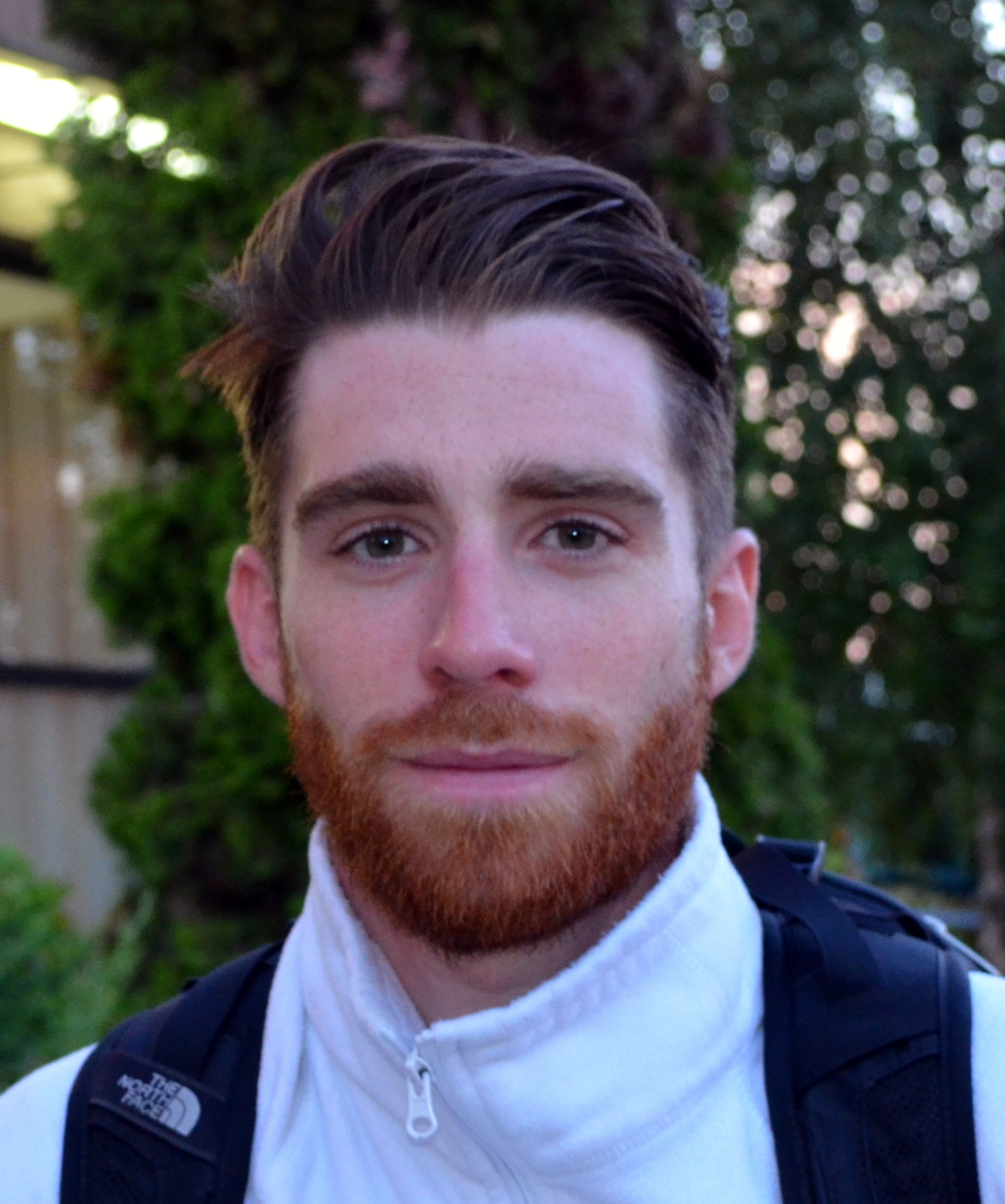
- Pacher in 2015

Personal information
- Full name: Quentin Pacher
- Born: 6 January 1992 (age 34) Libourne, France
- Height: 1.79 m (5 ft 10 in)
- Weight: 62 kg (137 lb)

Cycling career
- Sport: Cycling
- Current team: Groupama–FDJ United
- Discipline: Road
- Role: Rider
- Rider type: Puncheur

Amateur teams
- 2011–2013: Entente Sud Gascogne
- 2014: AVC Aix-en-Provence

Professional teams
- 2015: Armée de Terre
- 2016–2017: Delko–Marseille Provence KTM
- 2018–2021: Vital Concept
- 2022–: Groupama–FDJ

Quentin Pacher (born 6 January 1992) is a French cyclist, who currently rides for UCI WorldTeam Groupama–FDJ United. In August 2020, he was named in the startlist for the 2020 Tour de France.

== Major results ==
2012
1st Mountains classification, Kreiz Breizh Elites
10th Overall Ronde de l'Isard

1st Stage 3

2014
5th Trofeo Edil C
2015
1st Young rider classification, Tour du Haut Var
1st Mountains classification, Rhône-Alpes Isère Tour
7th Grand Prix de Plumelec-Morbihan
2016
6th Overall Vuelta a la Comunidad de Madrid
8th Grand Prix de Plumelec-Morbihan
9th Paris–Camembert
9th Tour du Doubs
2017
6th Overall Arctic Race of Norway
8th Hong Kong Challenge
2018
1st Stage 5 Tour de Savoie Mont-Blanc
2nd Famenne Ardenne Classic
4th Overall Tour de Wallonie
5th Overall Sharjah International Cycling Tour
7th Classic de l'Ardèche
8th Overall Tour du Haut Var
9th Tour du Gévaudan Occitanie
10th Overall Tour La Provence
10th Volta Limburg Classic
2019
2nd Overall Circuit de la Sarthe
4th Volta Limburg Classic
5th Overall Tour de Wallonie
9th Tour du Doubs
10th Overall Tour of Oman
2020
5th Overall Tour de Langkawi
2021
6th Overall Tour du Rwanda
9th Bretagne Classic
Combativity award Stage 13 Tour de France
2022
7th Faun-Ardèche Classic
9th Trofeo Laigueglia
10th Overall Étoile de Bessèges
2024
6th Grand Prix La Marseillaise
7th Overall O Gran Camiño
8th Amstel Gold Race
9th Overall Tour des Alpes-Maritimes
Combativity award Stage 12 Tour de France
2025
9th Classic Var
Combativity award Stage 17 Tour de France

=== Grand Tour general classification results timeline ===
Grand Tour	2020	2021	2022	2023	2024	2025
Giro d'Italia	—	—	—	—	—	64
Tour de France	53	35	—	63	46	45
Vuelta a España	—	—	—	—	21	

Legend
—	Did not compete
DNF	Did not finish
