= Patrick Müller (cyclist) =

Swiss cyclist (born 1996)

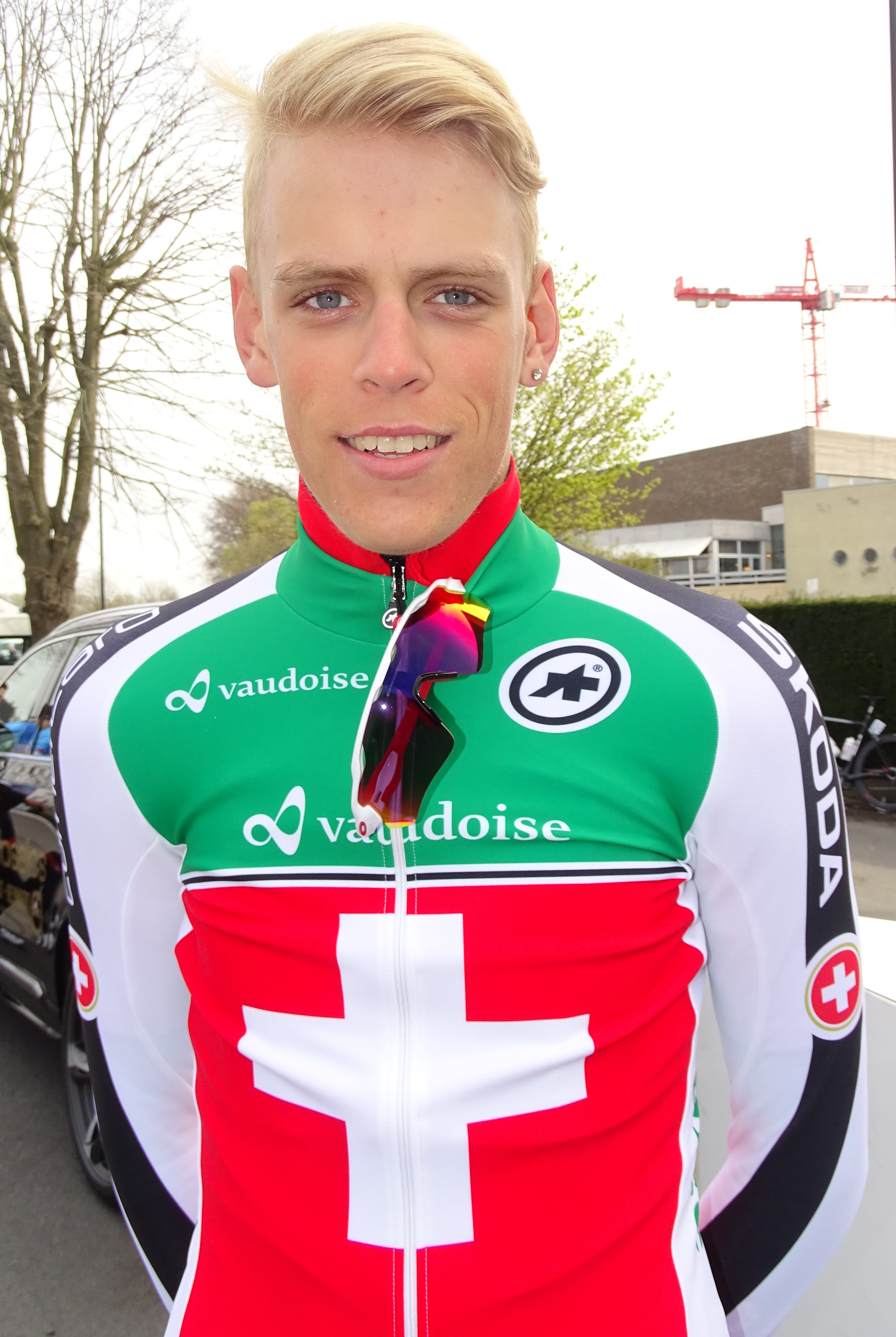
- Müller at the 2016 Ronde van Vlaanderen U23

Personal information
- Full name: Patrick Müller
- Born: 18 April 1996 (age 30) Zürich, Switzerland
- Height: 1.92 m (6 ft 4 in)
- Weight: 74 kg (163 lb)

Cycling career
- Sport: Cycling
- Current team: Retired
- Discipline: Road
- Role: Rider

Amateur teams
- 2014: RV Wetzikon
- 2015–2017: BMC Development Team
- 2017: BMC Racing Team (stagiaire)

Professional team
- 2018–2019: Vital Concept

Patrick Müller (born 18 April 1996) is a Swiss former professional cyclist, who competed as a professional for the Vital Concept–B&B Hotels team in 2018 and 2019. He announced his retirement in July 2019 in only his second season as a professional due to a recurring pain in his left leg as well as an unsuccessful operation on the iliac artery. During his career, he had one professional victory: the 2019 Volta Limburg Classic.

== Major results ==
=== Road ===
2013
National Junior Championships

1st Road race
2nd Time trial

1st Tour de Berne Juniors
4th Overall Tour du Pays de Vaud

1st Stage 3

2014
1st Road race, National Junior Championships
8th Overall Tour du Pays de Vaud

1st Points classification
1st Stage 3

2015
1st Road race, National Under-23 Championships
10th Overall Rhône-Alpes Isère Tour
2016
1st Giro del Belvedere
1st Stage 1 (TTT) Giro della Valle d'Aosta
2nd Trofeo Banca Popolare di Vicenza
3rd Time trial, National Under-23 Championships
4th Piccolo Giro di Lombardia
6th Kernen Omloop Echt-Susteren
8th Gran Premio Palio del Recioto
10th Road race, UEC European Under-23 Championships
2017
3rd Eschborn-Frankfurt City Loop U23
4th Ronde van Vlaanderen Beloften
5th Road race, National Championships
7th Liège–Bastogne–Liège Espoirs
10th Gent–Wevelgem Beloften
2018
9th Road race, UCI World Under-23 Championships
2019 (1 pro win)
1st Volta Limburg Classic
4th Overall Circuit de la Sarthe

1st Young rider classification

6th Classic Sud-Ardèche

=== Track ===
2013
3rd Team pursuit, UEC European Junior Championships
2015
2nd Team pursuit, UEC European Under-23 Championships
2nd Team pursuit, UCI World Cup, Cali
