= Enzo Wouters =

Belgian cyclist

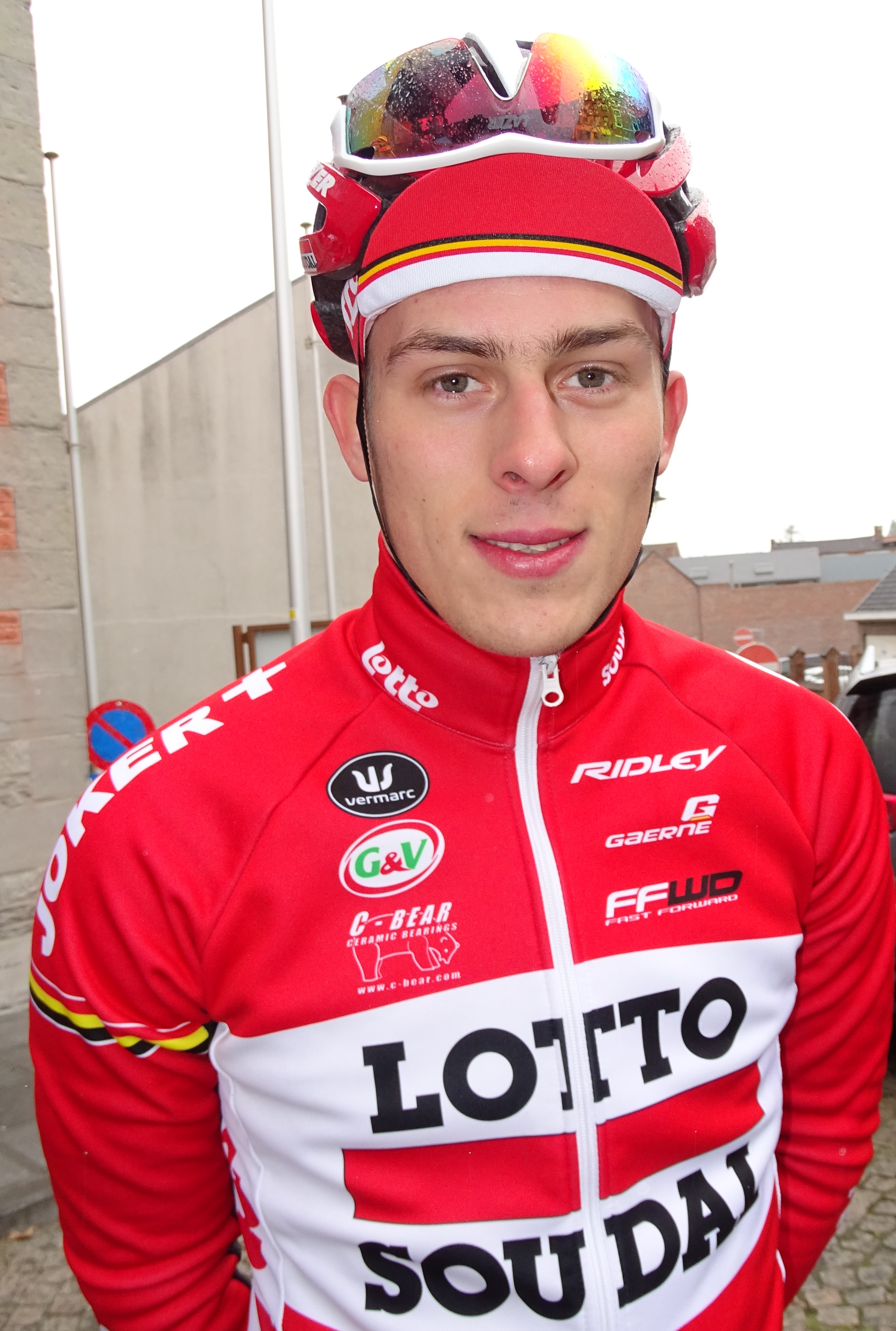
- Wouters in 2015.

Personal information
- Full name: Enzo Wouters
- Born: 21 March 1996 (age 30) Olen, Belgium
- Height: 1.83 m (6 ft 0 in)

Cycling career
- Sport: Cycling
- Discipline: Road
- Role: Rider

Amateur team
- 2015–2016: Lotto–Soudal U23

Professional teams
- 2017–2019: Lotto–Soudal
- 2020–2021: Tarteletto–Isorex

Enzo Wouters (born 21 March 1996) is a Belgian cyclist, who competed as a professional from 2017 to 2021.

== Major results ==
2013
1st Stage 3 Oberösterreich Juniorenrundfahrt
2014
1st Road race, National Junior Road Championships
1st Stage 3 Tour d'Istrie
1st Stage 3 Oberösterreich Juniorenrundfahrt
1st Stage 3 Internationale Niedersachsen-Rundfahrt
2nd Overall Keizer der Juniores

1st Stages 1 & 2b

3rd Paris–Roubaix Juniors
2016
2nd Road race, National Under-23 Road Championships
2nd Antwerpse Havenpijl
2nd Memorial Philippe Van Coningsloo
2020
10th Grote Prijs Jean-Pierre Monseré
2021
6th Dorpenomloop Rucphen
