= La Calmette =

Commune in Occitanie, France

- Commune
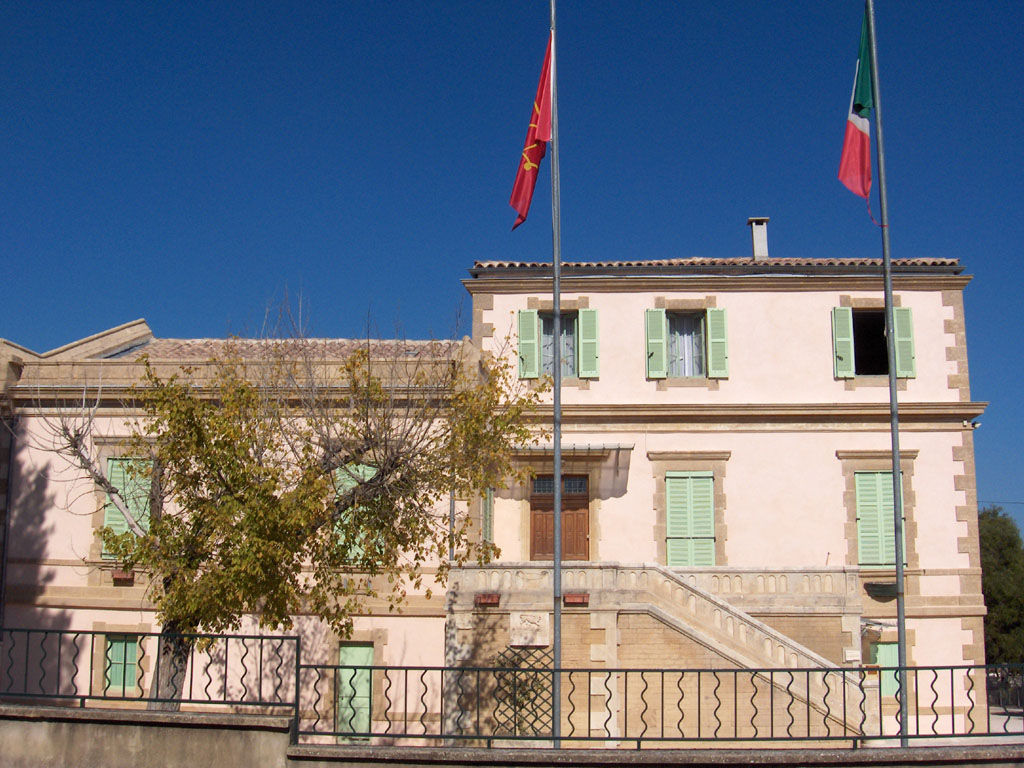
- Town hall

- Coat of arms
- Location of La Calmette
- Location within France Location within Occitanie
- Coordinates: 43°55′29″N 4°15′53″E
- Country: France
- Region: Occitania
- Department: Gard
- Arrondissement: Nîmes
- Canton: Uzès
- Intercommunality: CA Nîmes Métropole

Government
  - Mayor (2020–2026): Jacques Bollegue
- Area^{1}: 11.1 km^{2} (4.3 sq mi)
- Elevation: 52 m (171 ft)
- Highest elevation: 163 m (535 ft)
- Lowest elevation: 58 m (190 ft)
- Population (2023): 2,604
  - Density: 235/km^{2} (608/sq mi)
- Time zone: UTC+01:00 (CET)
  - Summer (DST): UTC+02:00 (CEST)
- INSEE/Postal code: 30061 /30190
- ^{1} French Land Register data, which excludes lakes, ponds, glaciers > 1 km^{2} (0.386 sq mi or 247 acres) and river estuaries.

La Calmette (French pronunciation: [la kalmɛt]; Occitan: La Caumeta) is a commune in the Gard department in southern France.

== Population ==
Historical population
| Year | Pop. | ±% p.a. |
|---|---|---|
| 1968 | 712 | — |
| 1975 | 710 | −0.04% |
| 1982 | 893 | +3.33% |
| 1990 | 1,318 | +4.99% |
| 1999 | 1,635 | +2.42% |
| 2007 | 1,933 | +2.11% |
| 2012 | 2,015 | +0.83% |
| 2017 | 2,200 | +1.77% |
| 2023 | 2,604 | +2.85% |
Source: INSEE

== See also ==
- Communes of the Gard department
