= Bjørn Tore Hoem =

Norwegian cyclist

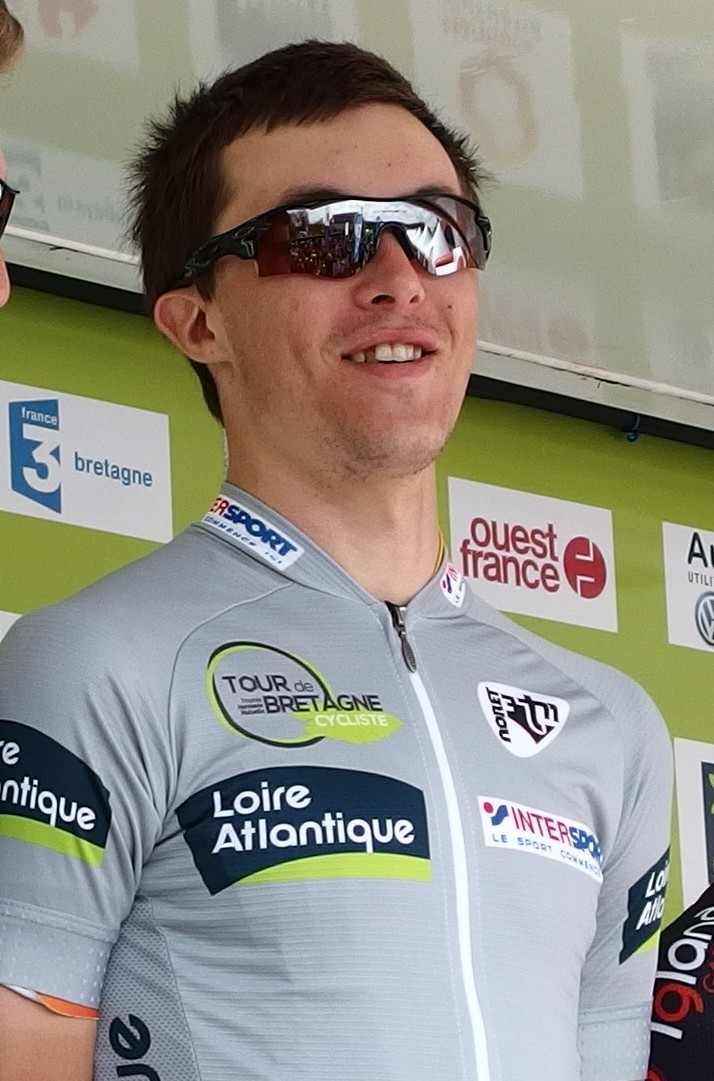
- Hoem at the 2014 Tour de Bretagne

Personal information
- Full name: Bjørn Tore Hoem Nilsen
- Born: 12 April 1991 (age 35) Norway

Cycling career
- Sport: Cycling
- Current team: Retired
- Discipline: Road
- Role: Rider

Amateur team
- 2009–2010: CK NOR–Melhus

Professional teams
- 2011–2014: Plussbank–Cervélo
- 2015–2019: Team Joker

Bjørn Tore Hoem Nilsen (born 12 April 1991) is a Norwegian former professional cyclist, who rode professionally between 2011 and 2019.

== Major results ==
2011
3rd Ringerike GP
6th Overall Czech Cycling Tour
2012
3rd Overall Okolo Jižních Čech
2014
1st Eresfjord GP
2nd Time trial, National Road Championships
7th Ringerike GP
8th Overall Tour of Norway
9th Hadeland GP
2015
1st Stage 5 Tour de Normandie
3rd Overall Tour Alsace

1st Stage 1

2016
2nd Overall Ronde de l'Oise
5th Ringerike GP
7th Overall Tour des Fjords
8th Druivenkoers Overijse
9th Sundvolden GP
2017
6th Overall Ronde de l'Oise
7th Overall Arctic Race of Norway
2018
3rd Overall Tour de Normandie
2019
3rd Overall Ronde de l'Oise
5th Overall International Tour of Rhodes
8th Lillehammer GP
